= List of reptiles of Kerala =

This is a list of reptile species found in the Kerala, India.

== Order: Crocodilia (crocodilians) ==
=== Suborder: Eusuchia ===
==== Family: Crocodylidae (crocodiles) ====
===== Genus: Crocodylus =====
====== Crocodylus porosus (saltwater crocodile / കായൽ മുതല) ======
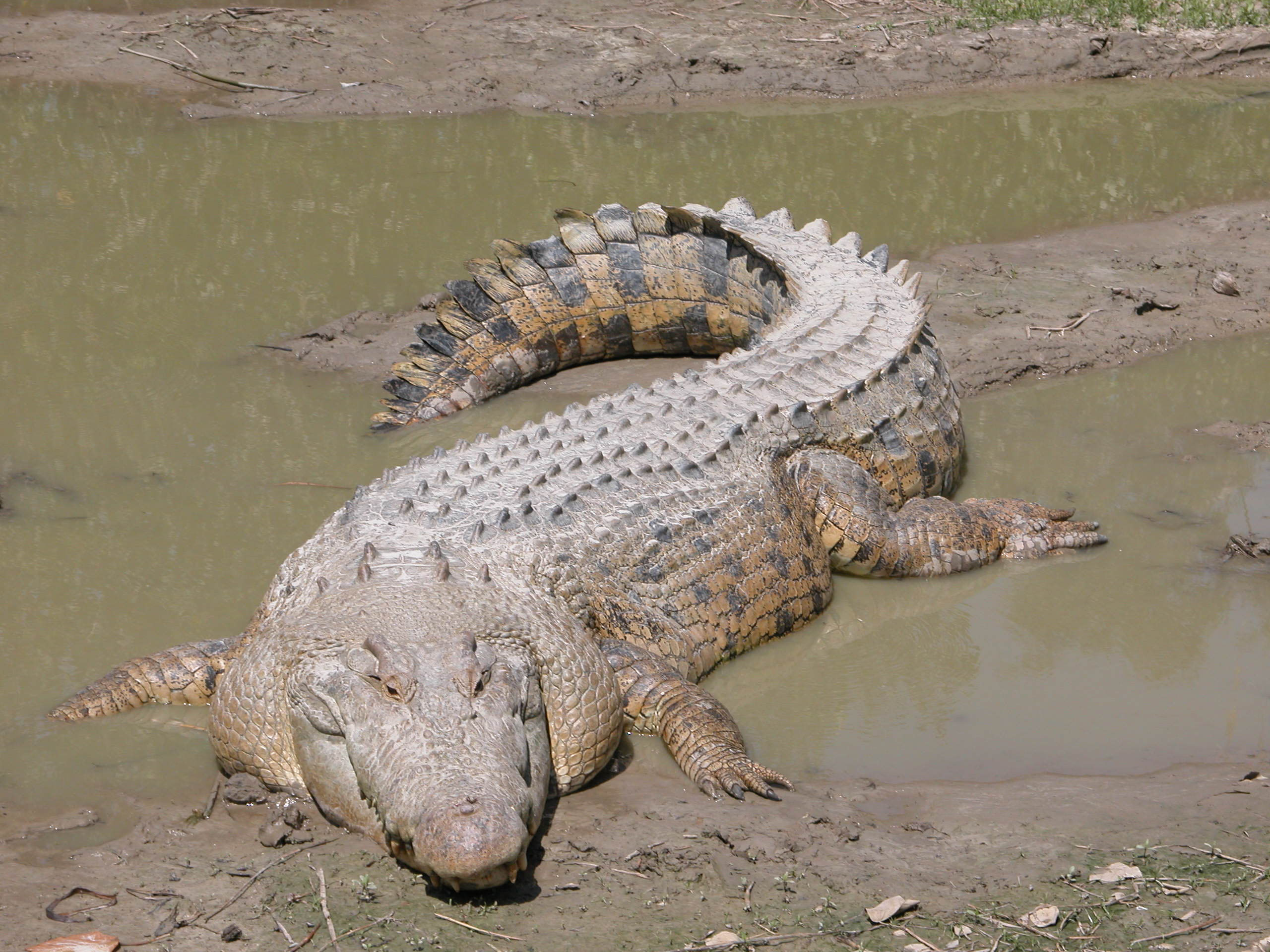
Dorsal view

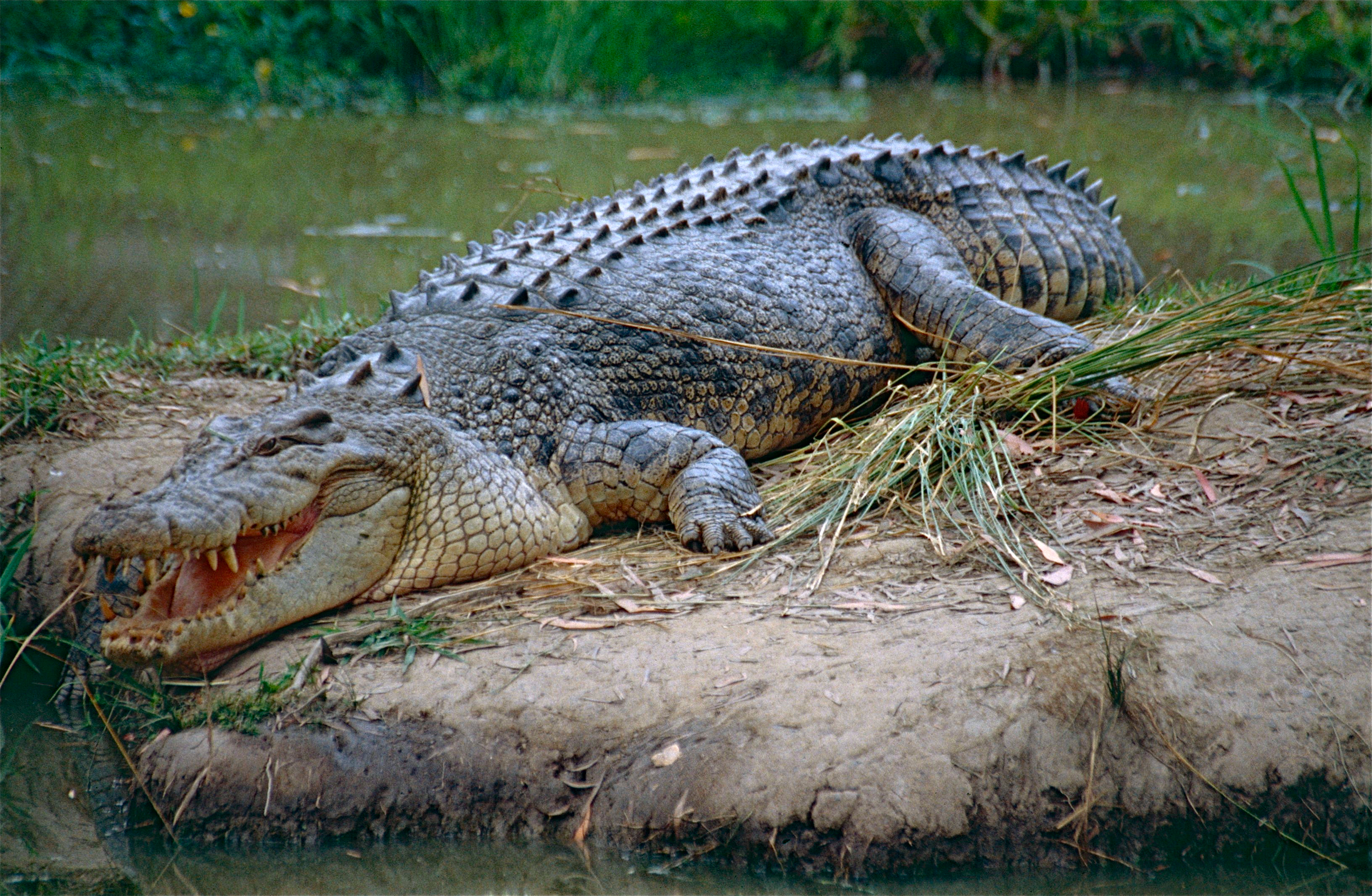
Lateral view

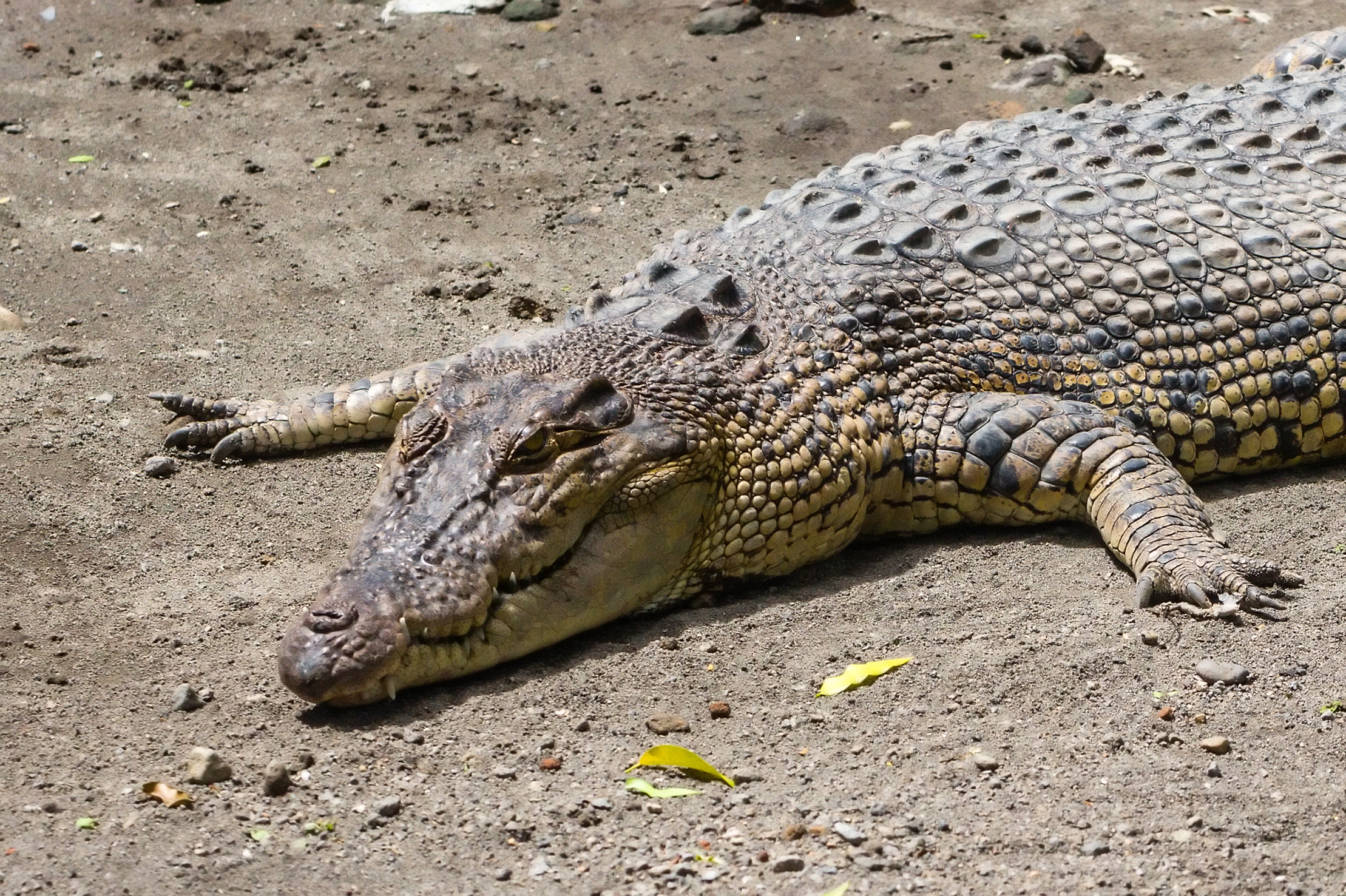
Head

====== Crocodylus palustris (mugger crocodile / മഗ്ഗർ മുതല) ======
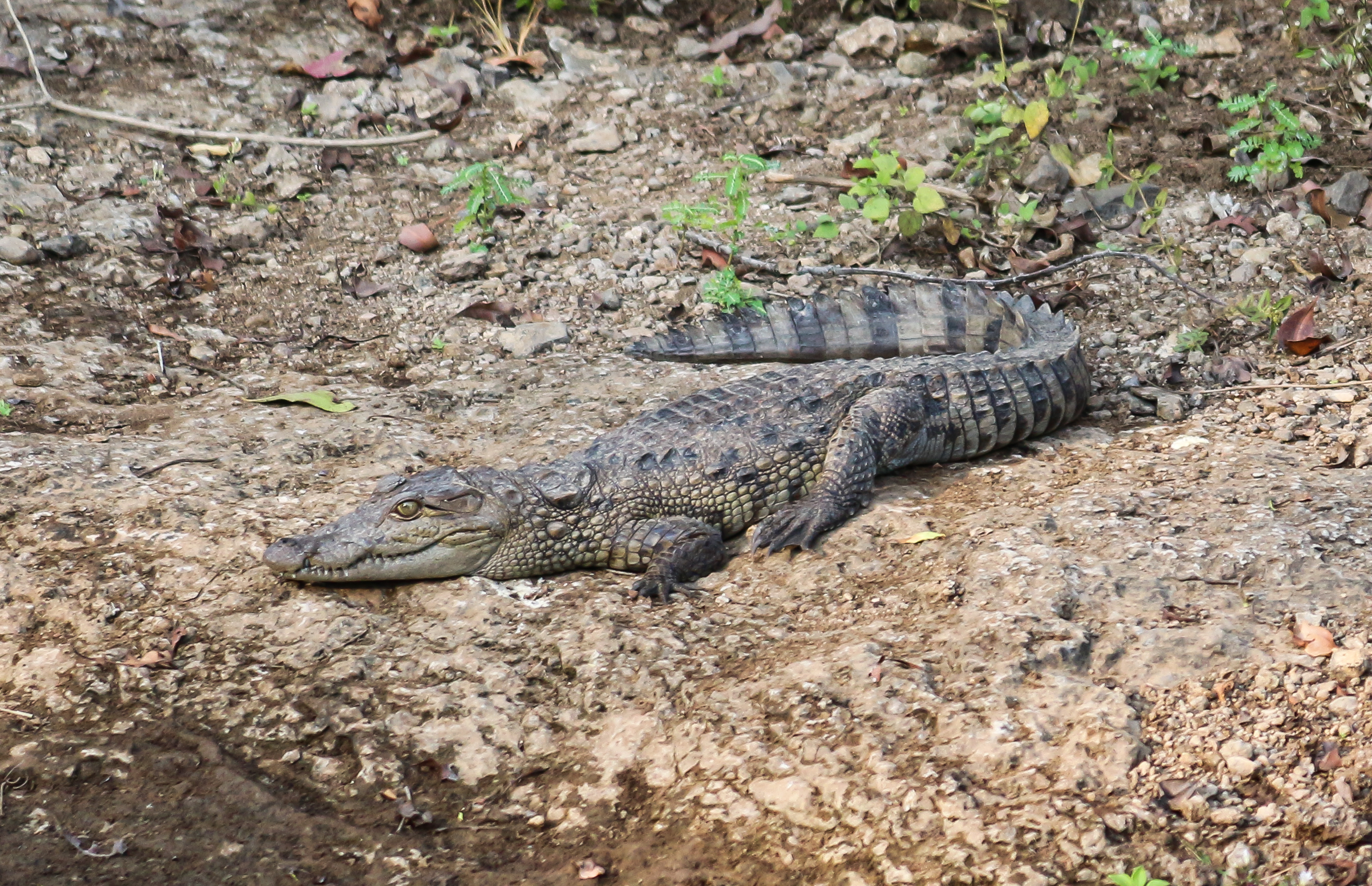
Lateral view

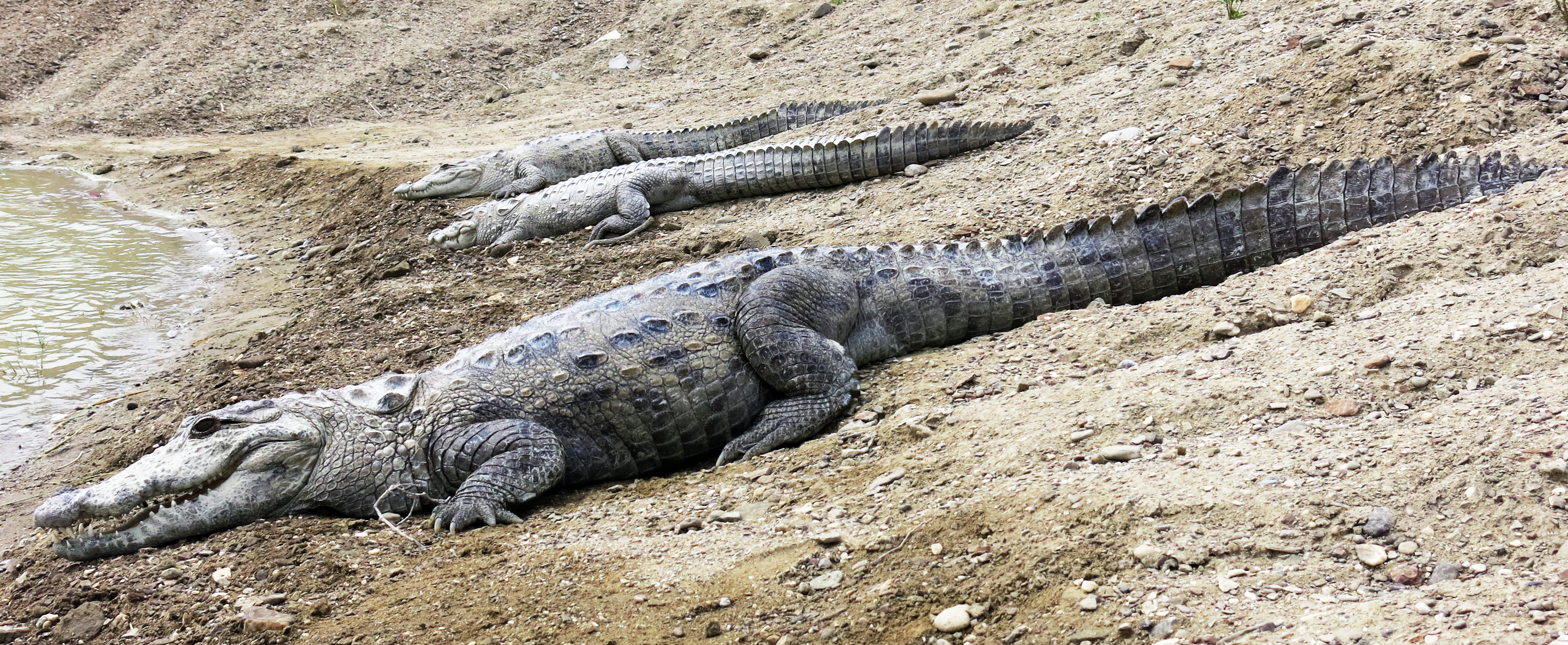
Lateral view

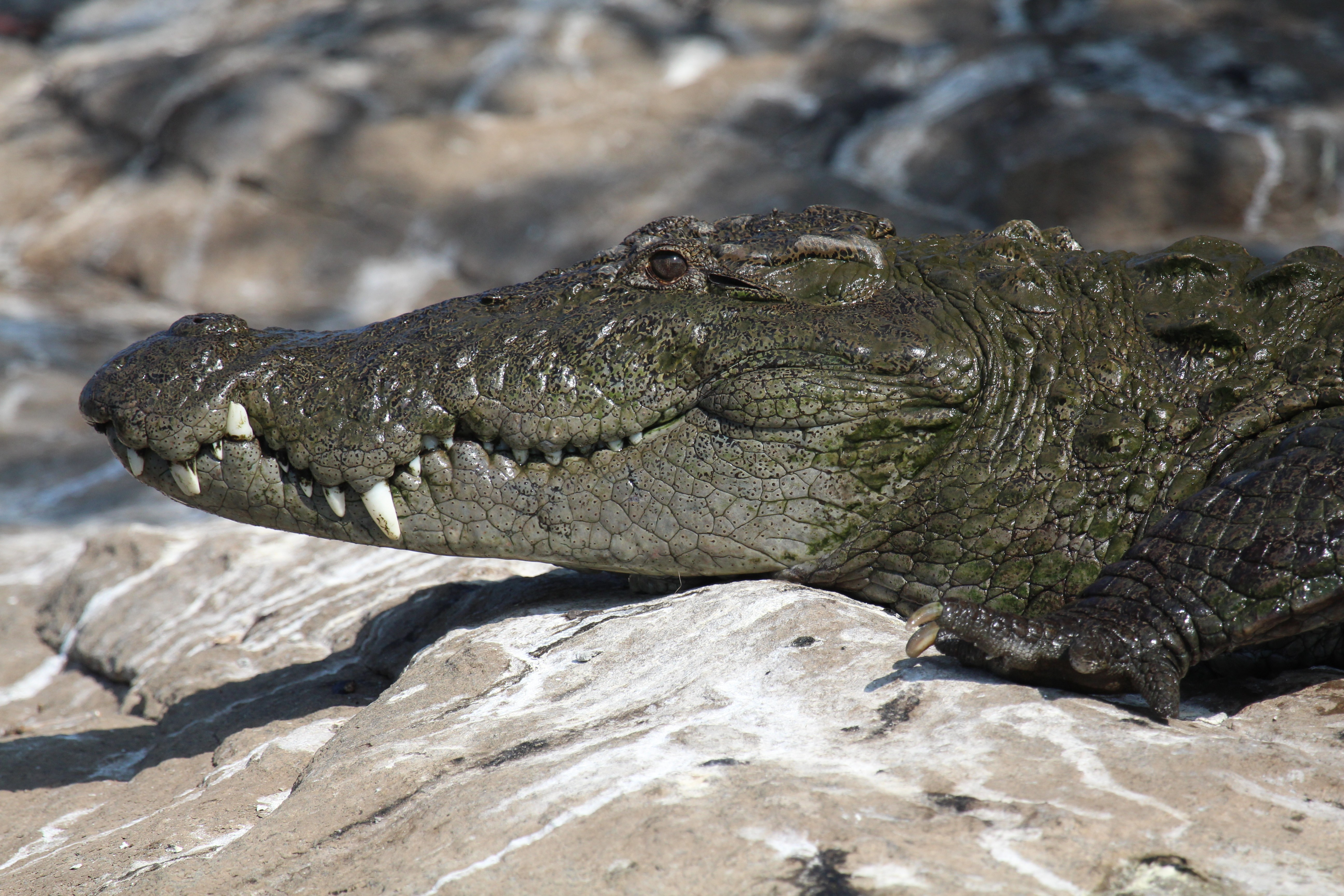
Head

== Order: Testudines (turtles) ==
=== Suborder: Cryptodira ===
==== Family: Geoemydidae (pond, river and wood turtles) ====
===== Genus: Melanochelys =====
====== Melanochelys trijuga (Indian black turtle / കാരാമ) ======
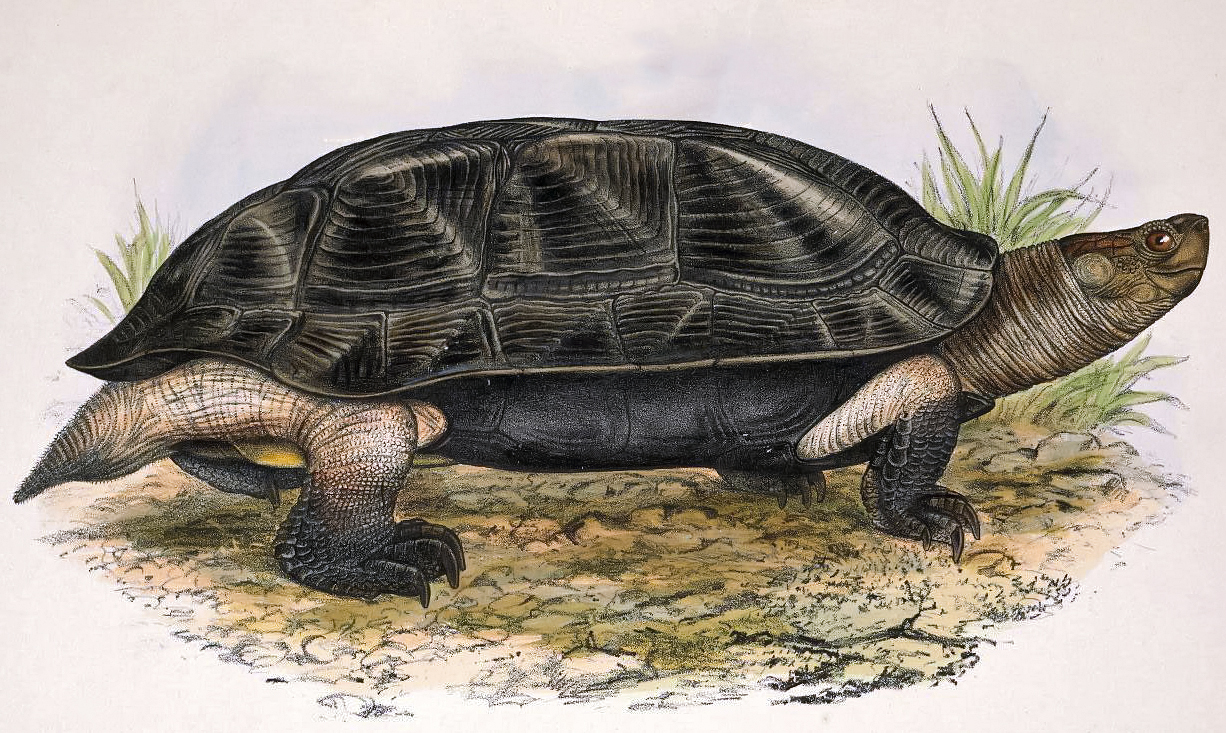
Illustration

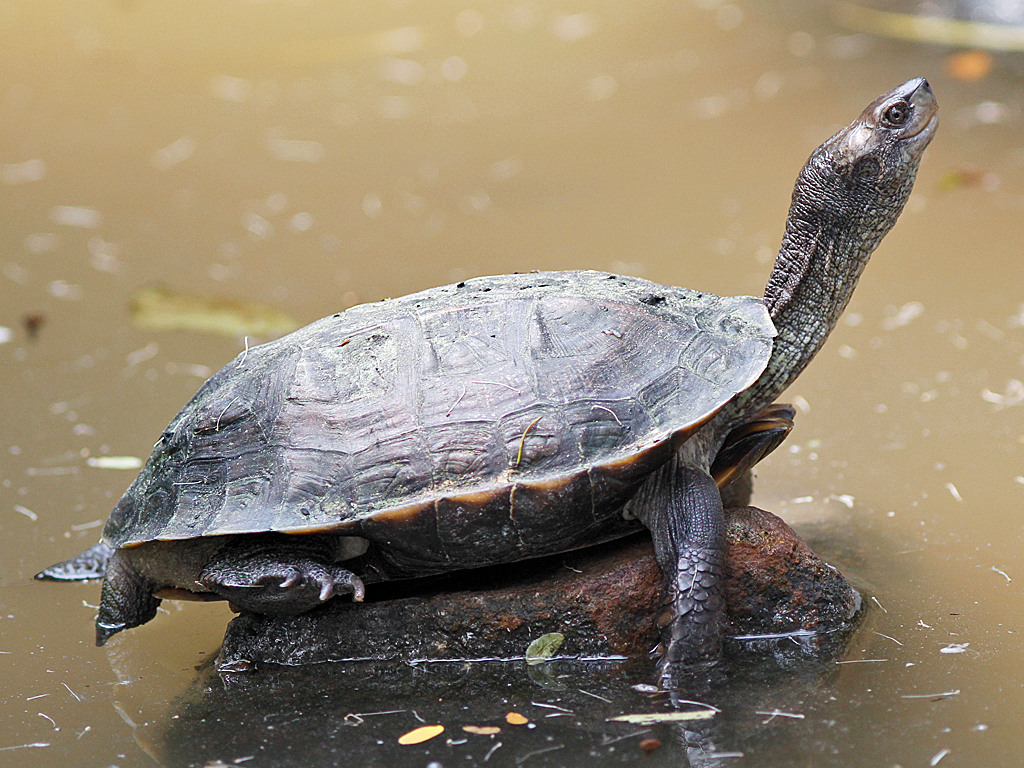
Lateral view

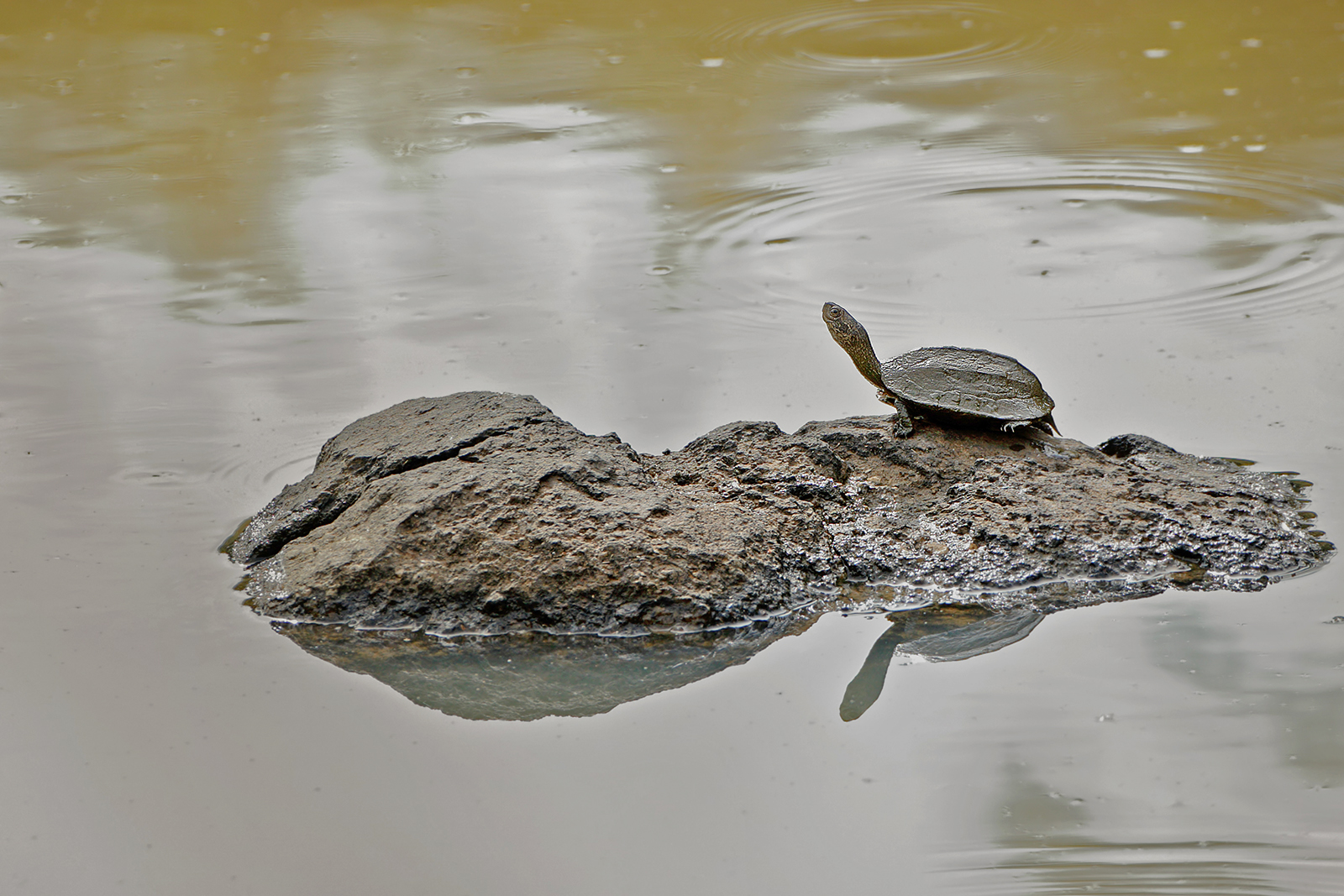
Lateral view

===== Genus: Vijayachelys =====
====== Vijayachelys silvatica (Cochin forest cane turtle / ചൂരലാമ) ======
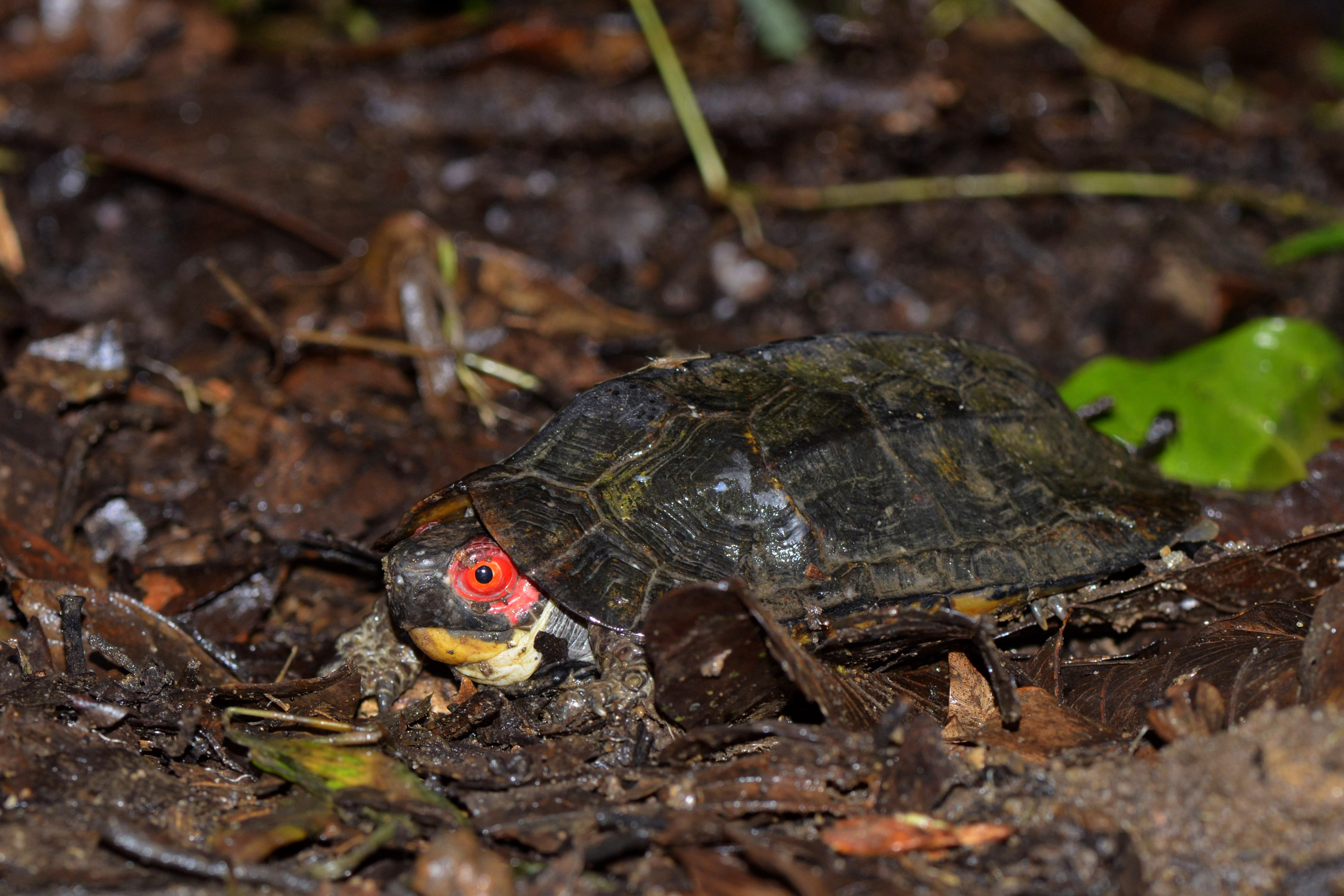
Lateral view

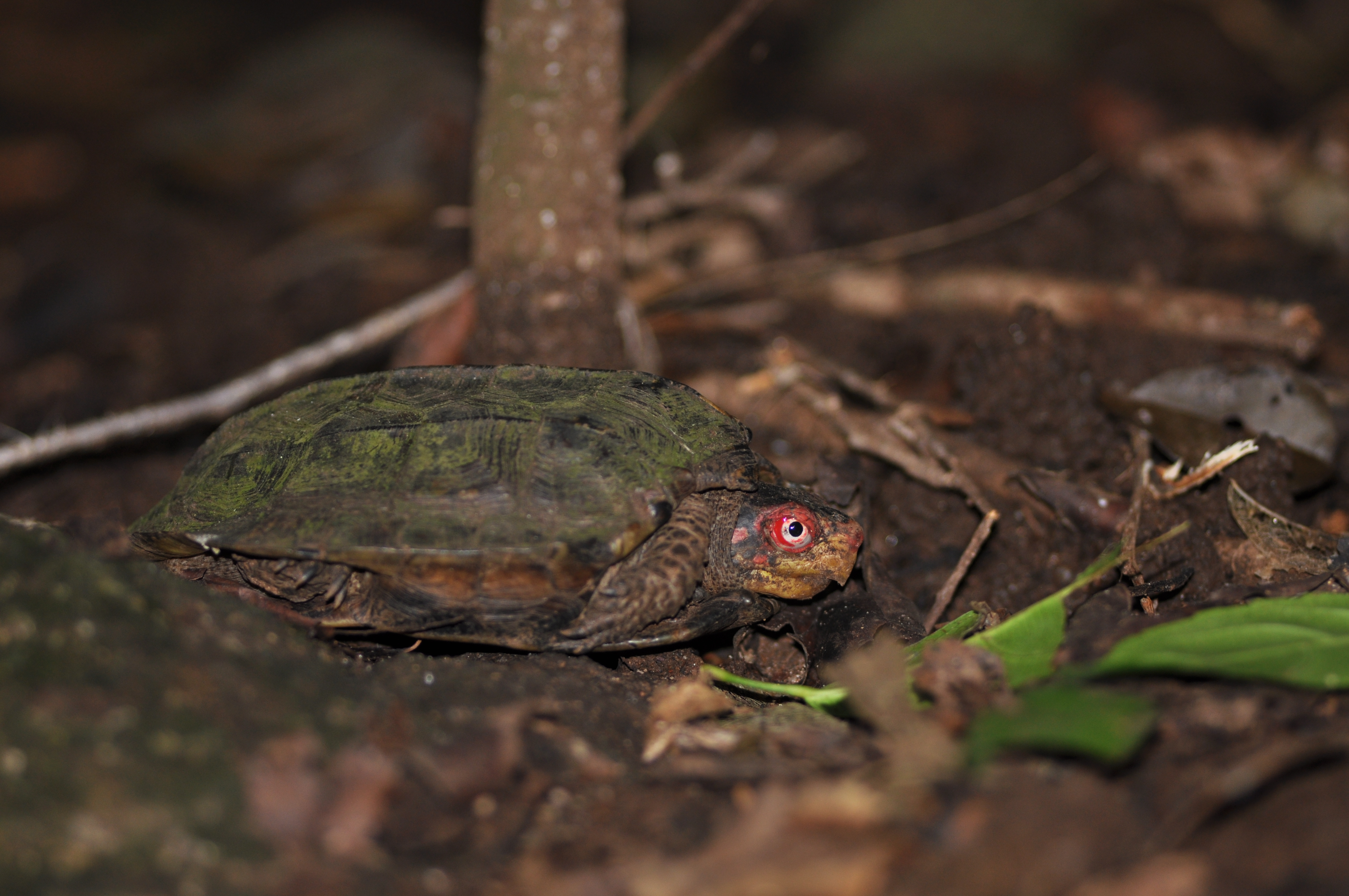
Lateral view

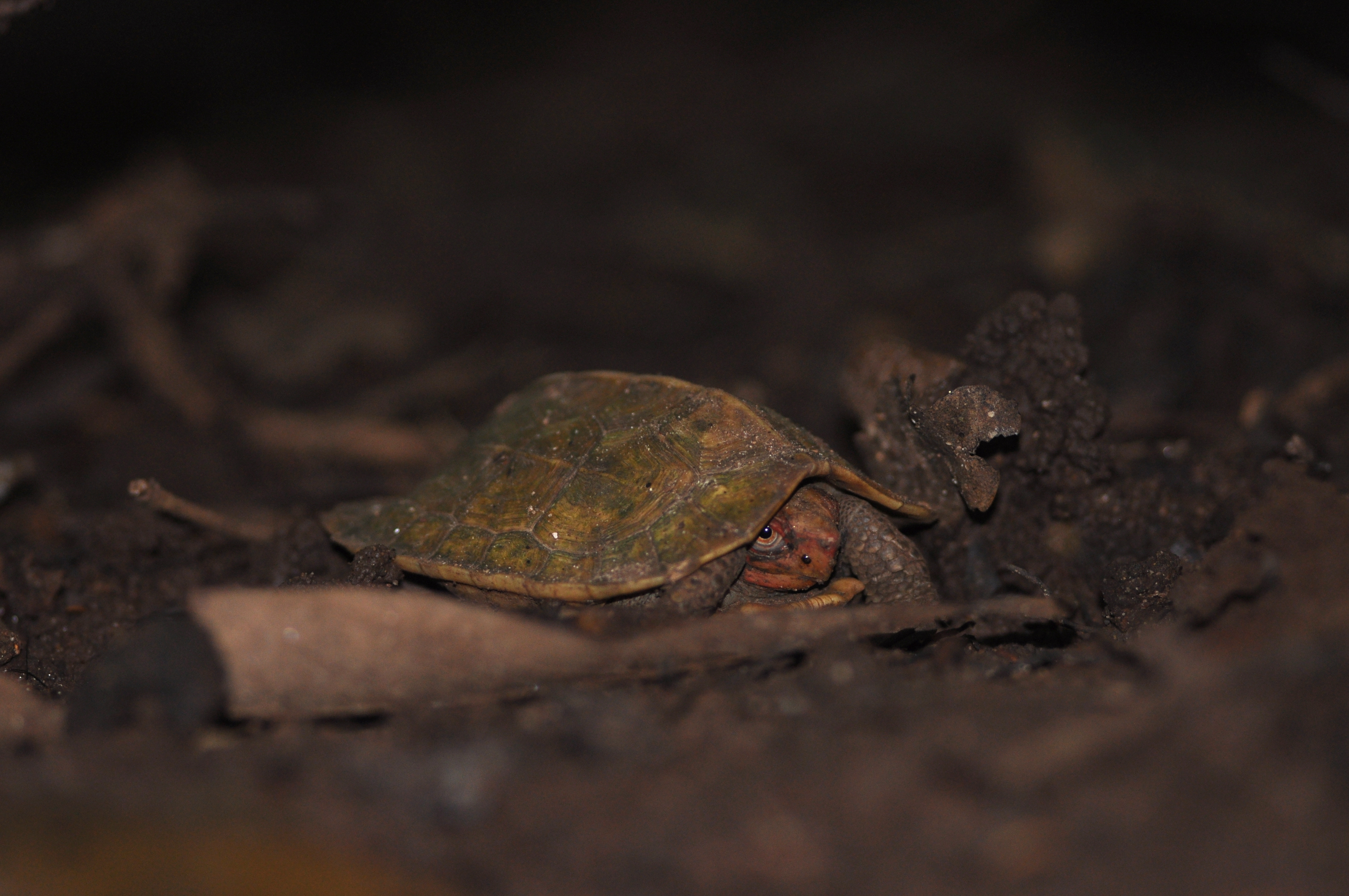
Front view

==== Family: Cheloniidae (sea turtles) ====
===== Genus: Chelonia =====
====== Chelonia mydas (green sea turtle / പച്ചക്കടലാമ) ======
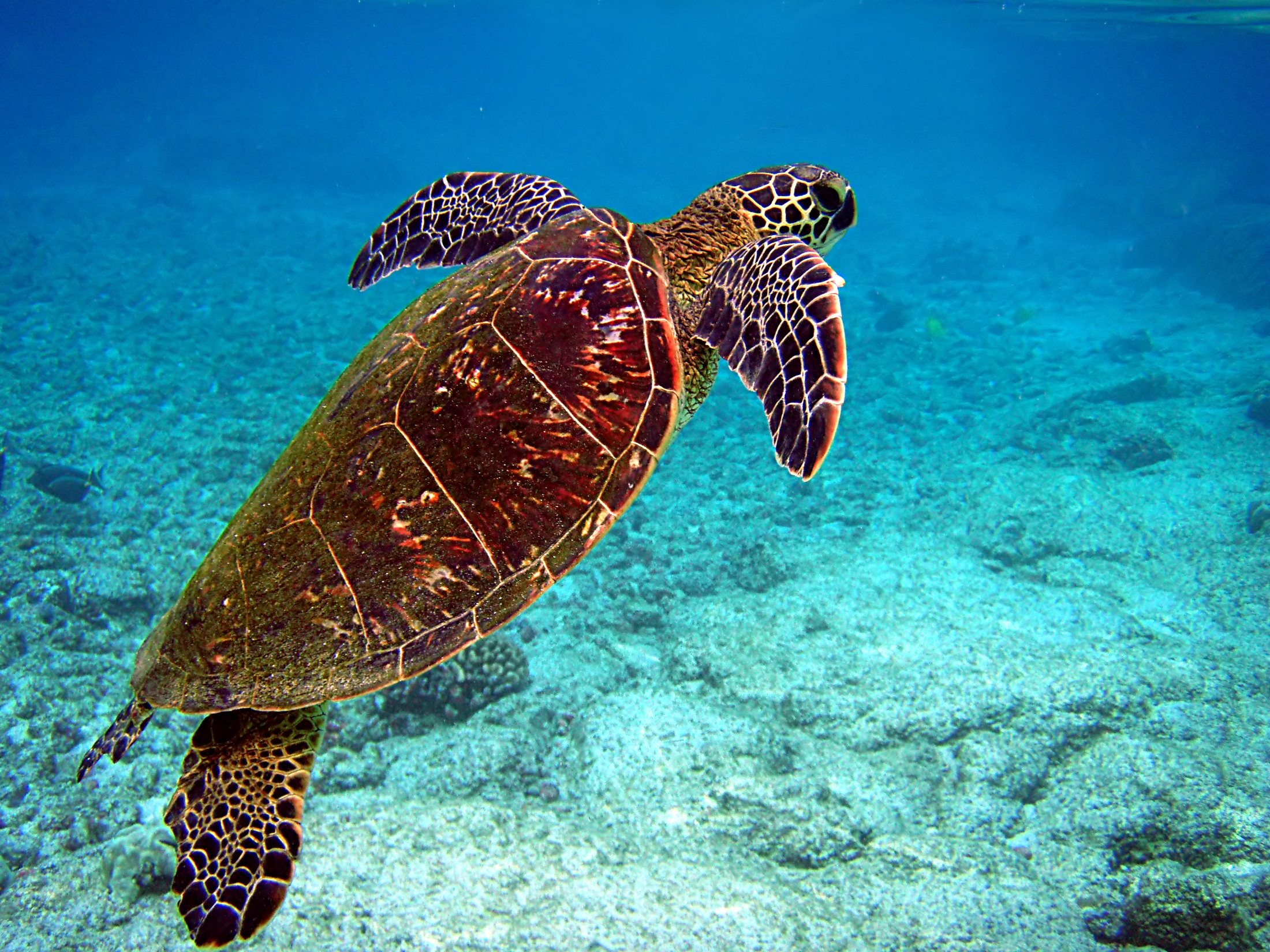
Dorsal view

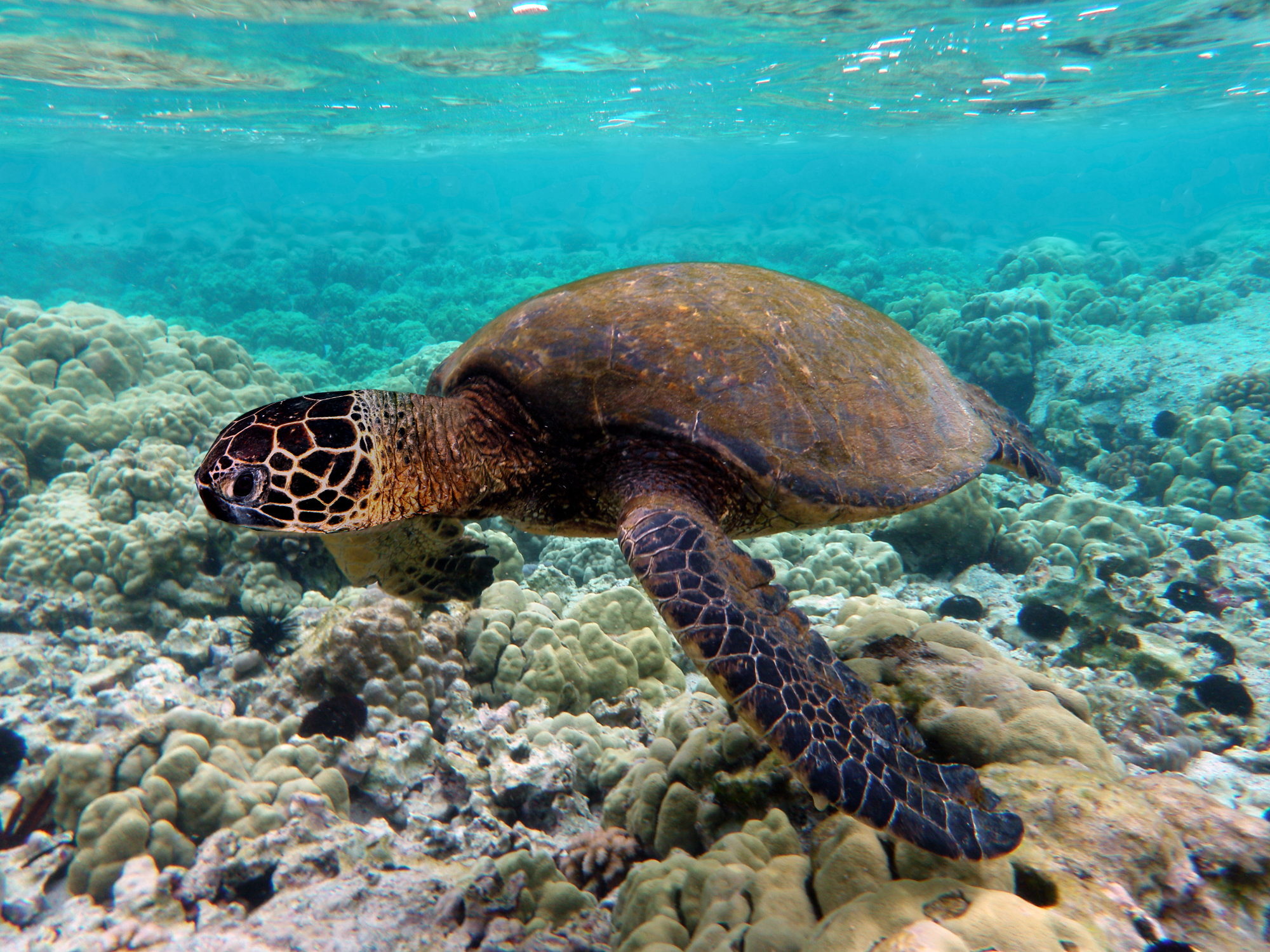
Lateral view

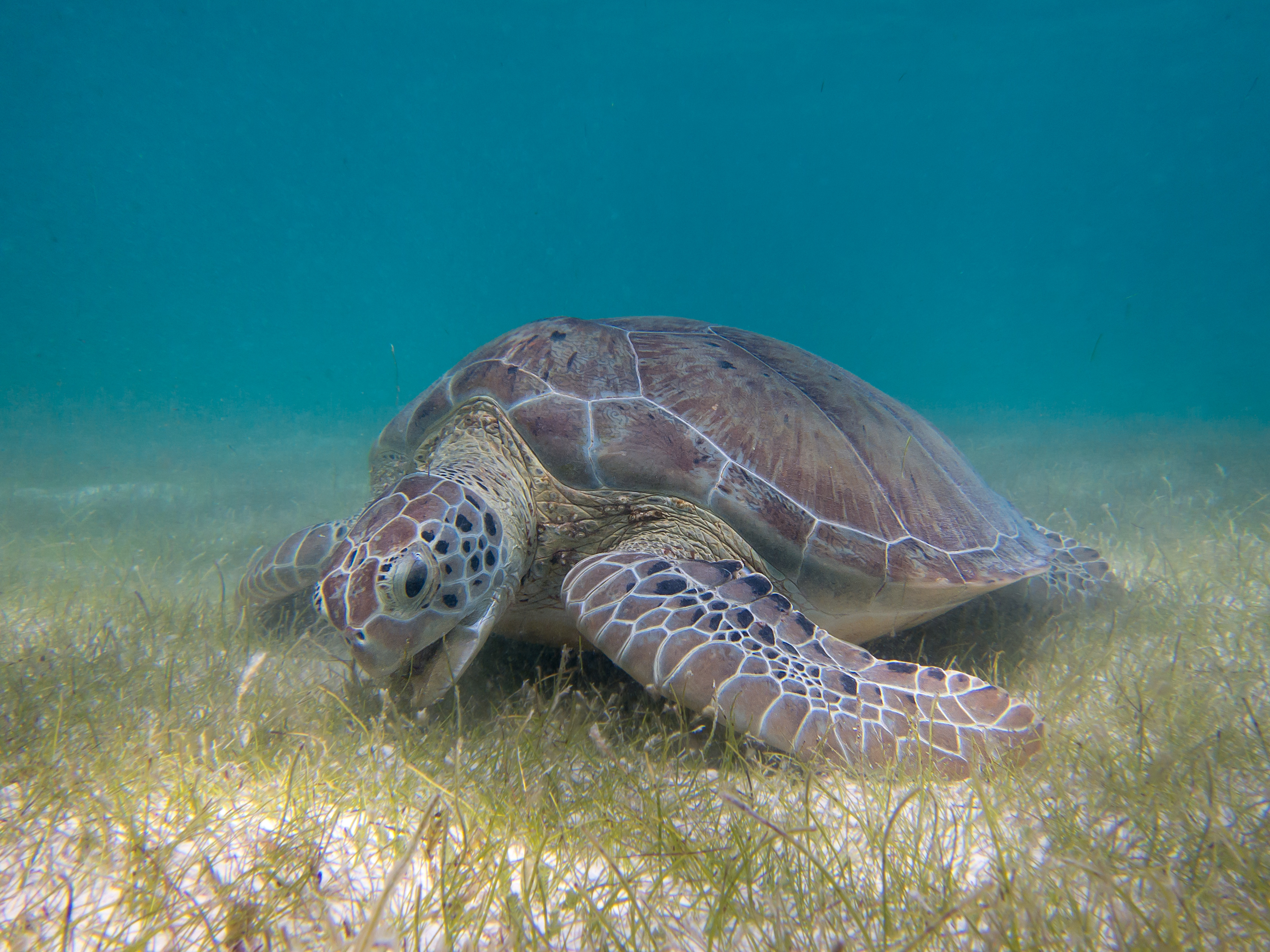
Front view

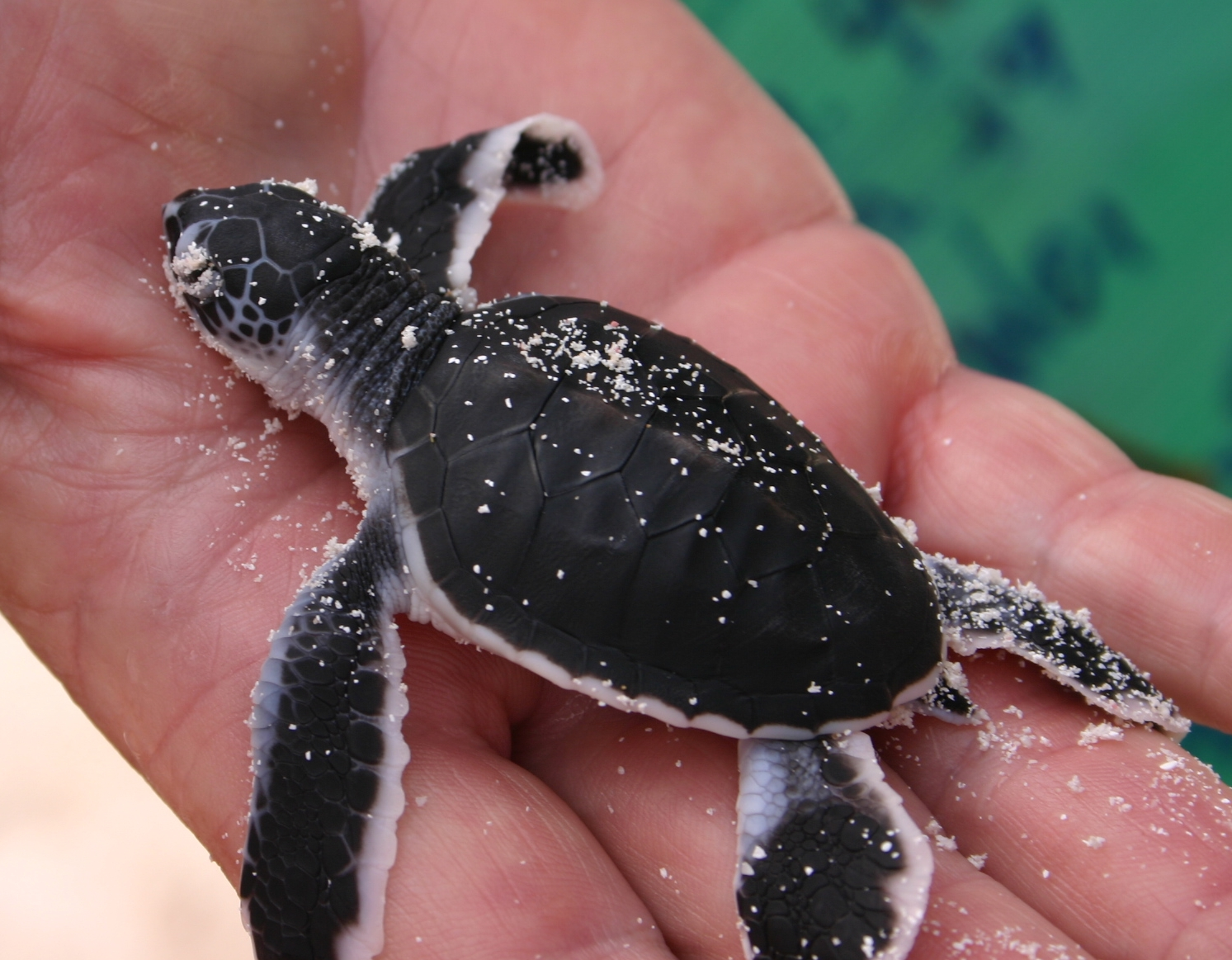
Hatchling

===== Genus: Eretmochelys =====
====== Eretmochelys imbricata (hawksbill sea turtle / ചുണ്ടൻ കടലാമ) ======
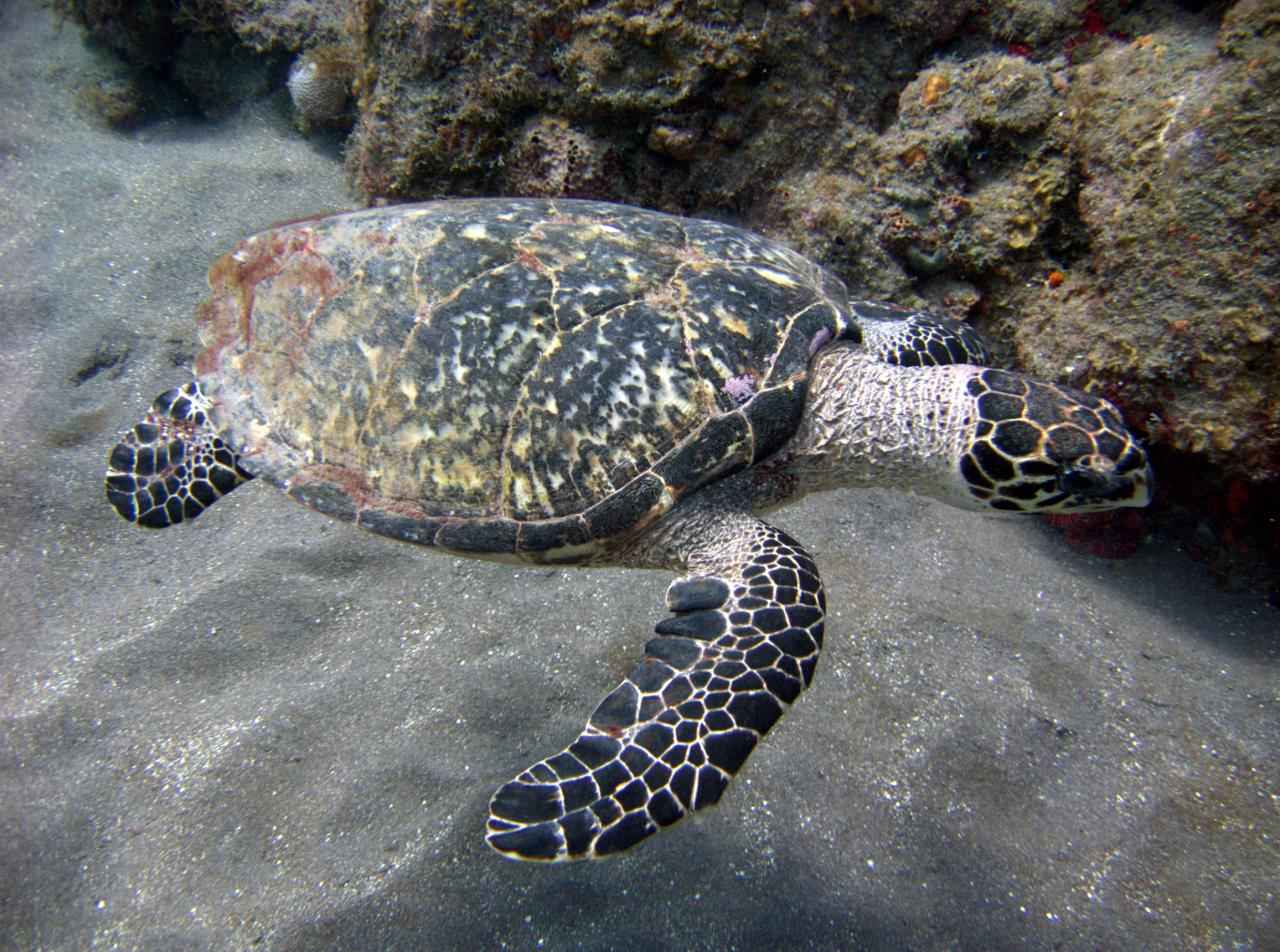
Dorsal view

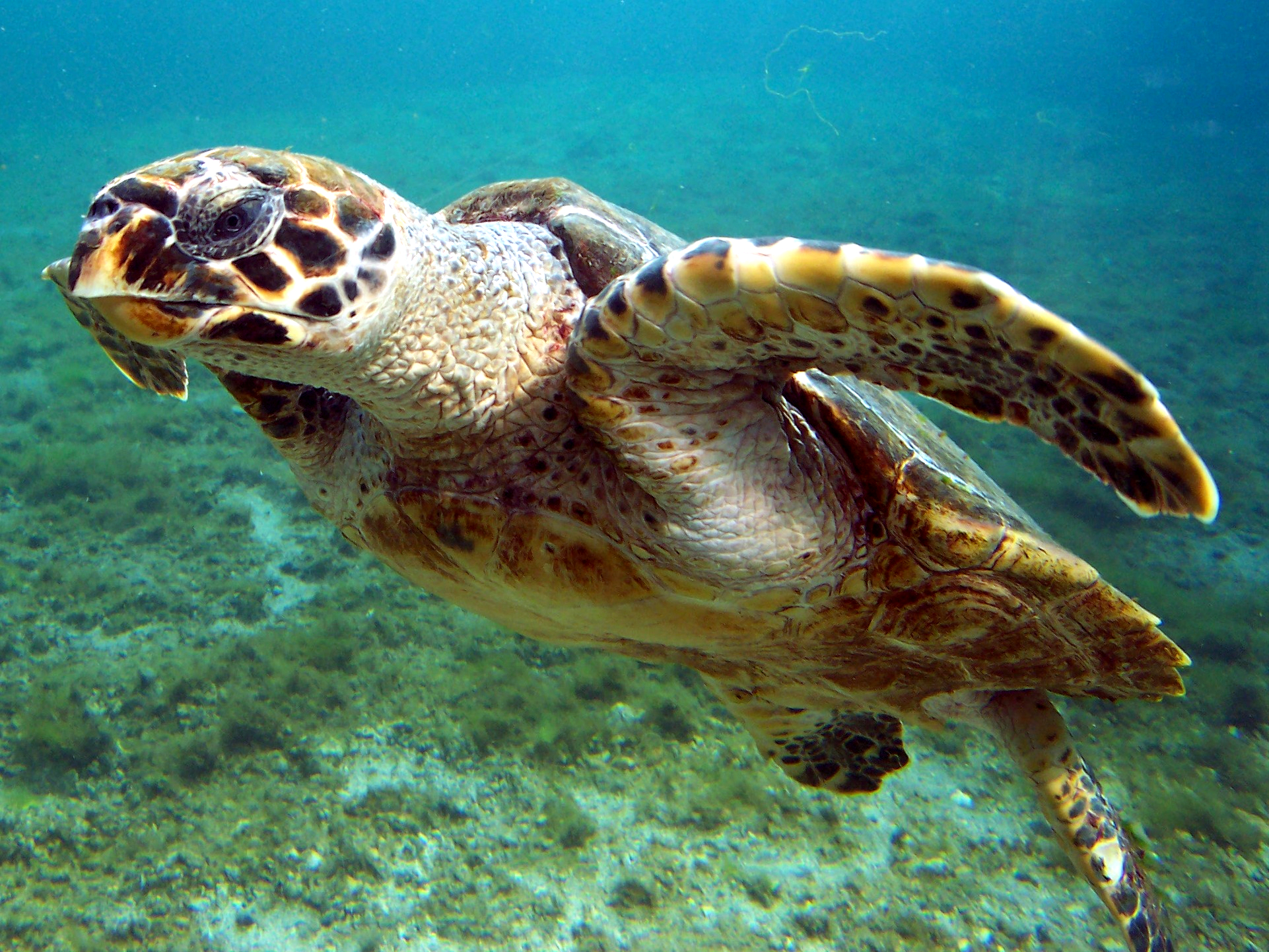
Ventral view

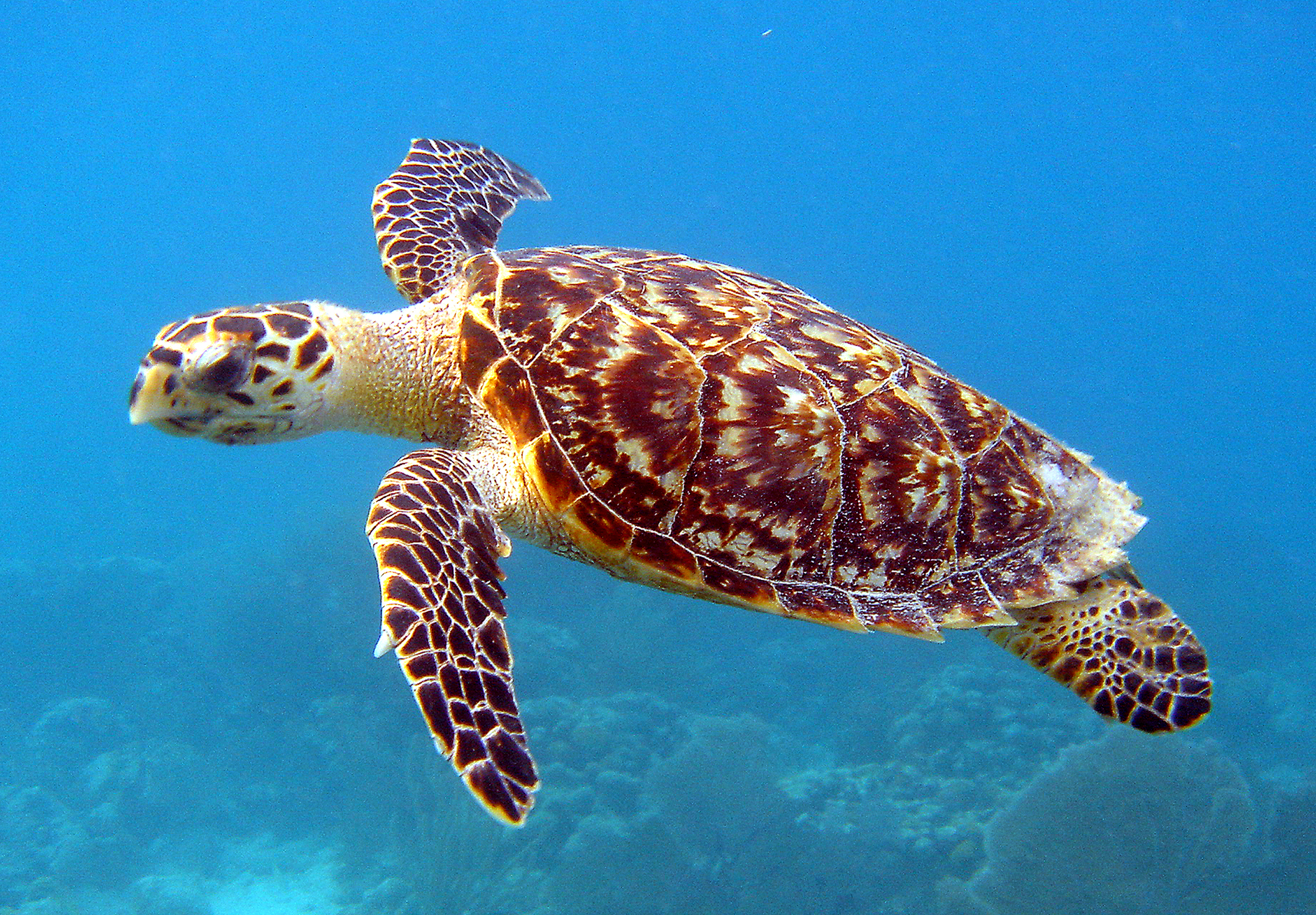
Lateral view

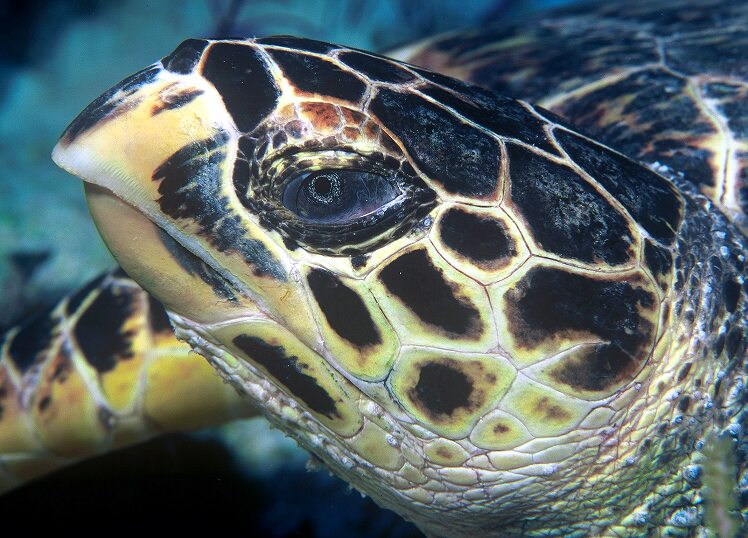
Head

===== Genus: Lepidochelys =====
====== Lepidochelys olivacea (olive ridley sea turtle / ഒലീവ് റിഡ്‌ലി കടലാമ) ======
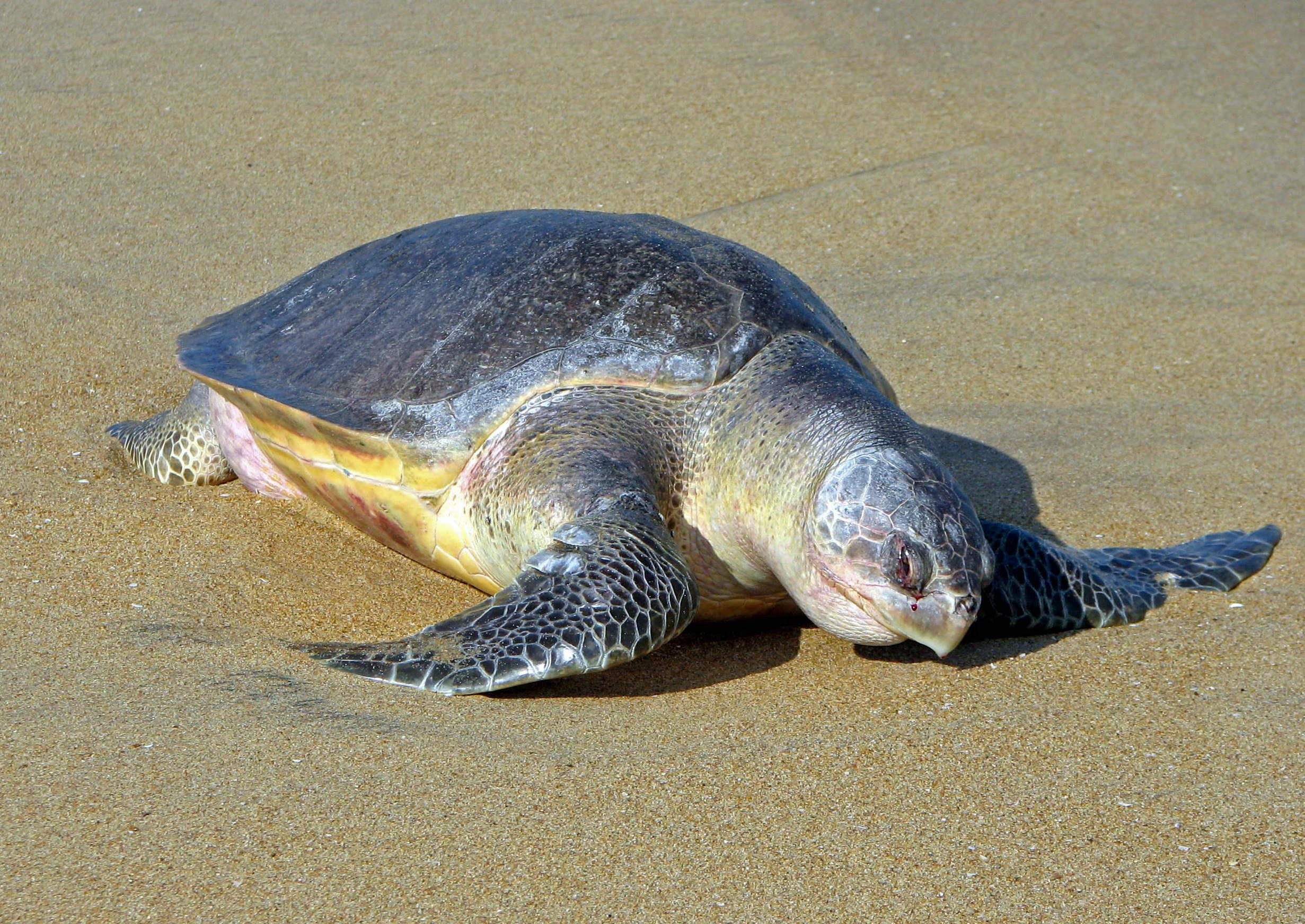
Lateral view

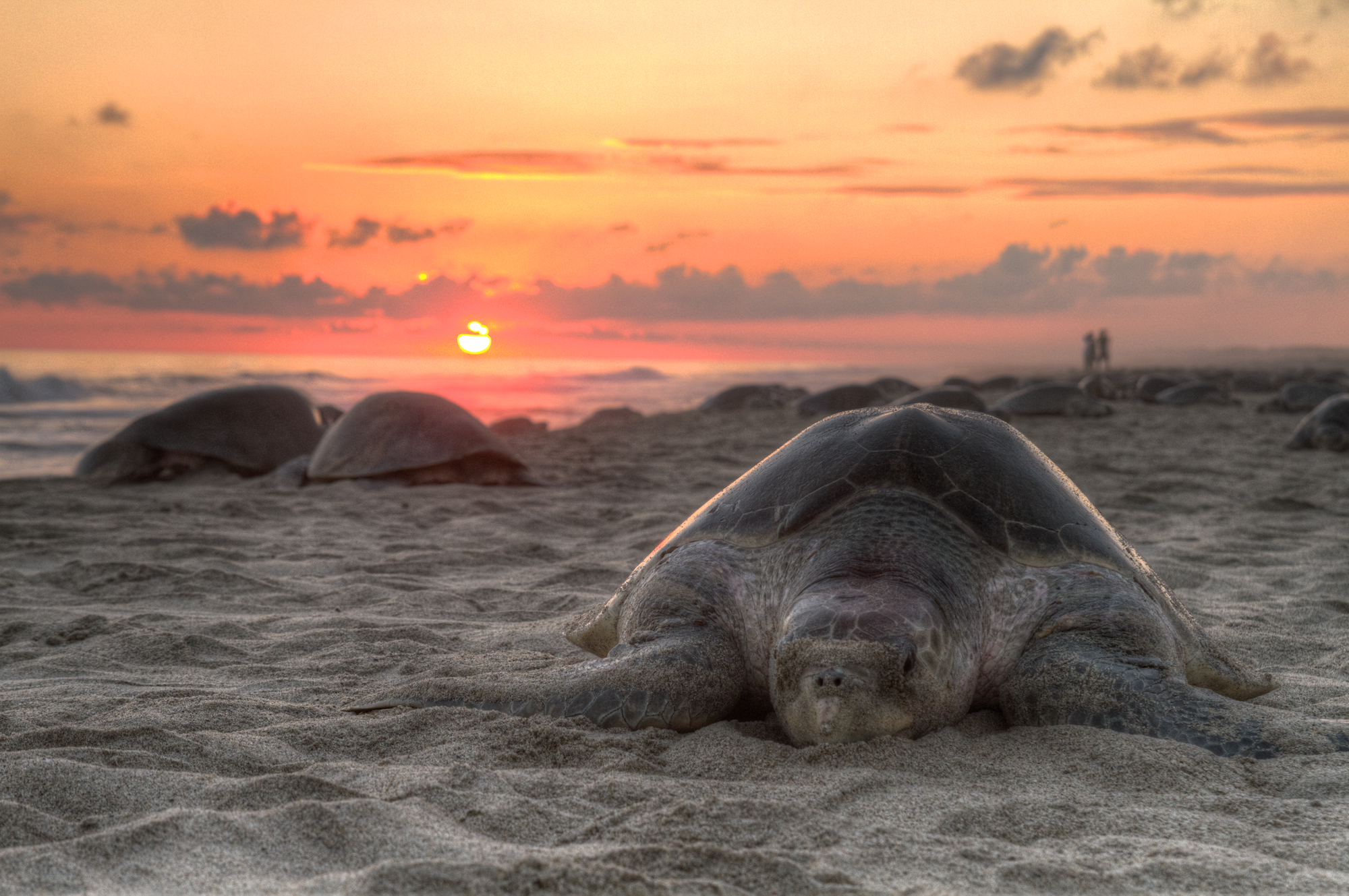
Nesting

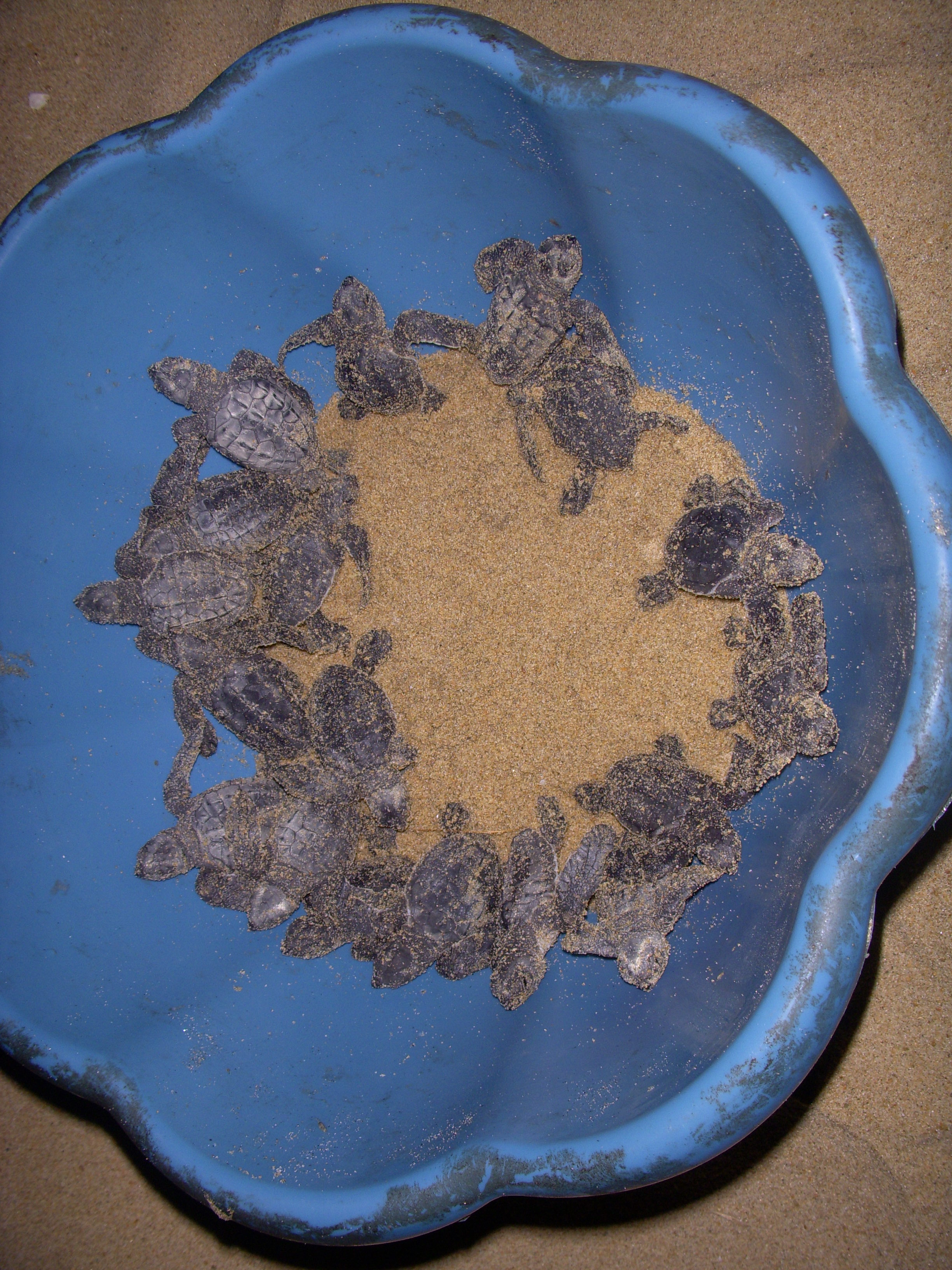
Hatchling

==== Family: Dermochelyidae (leatherback turtles) ====
===== Genus: Dermochelys =====
====== Dermochelys coriacea (leatherback sea turtle / തോൽപ്പുറകൻ കടലാമ) ======
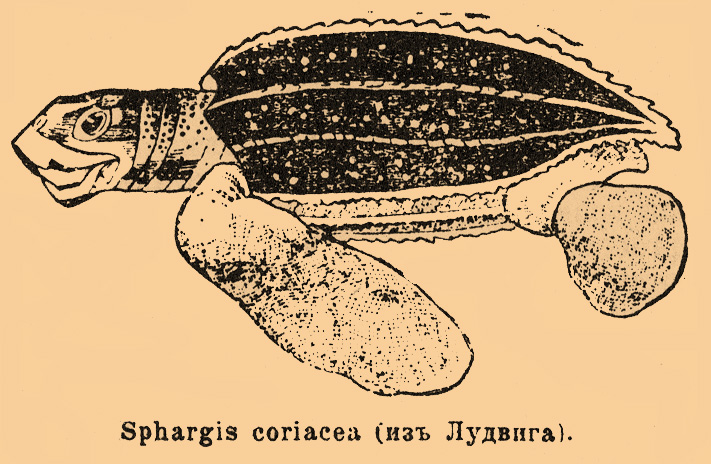
Illustration

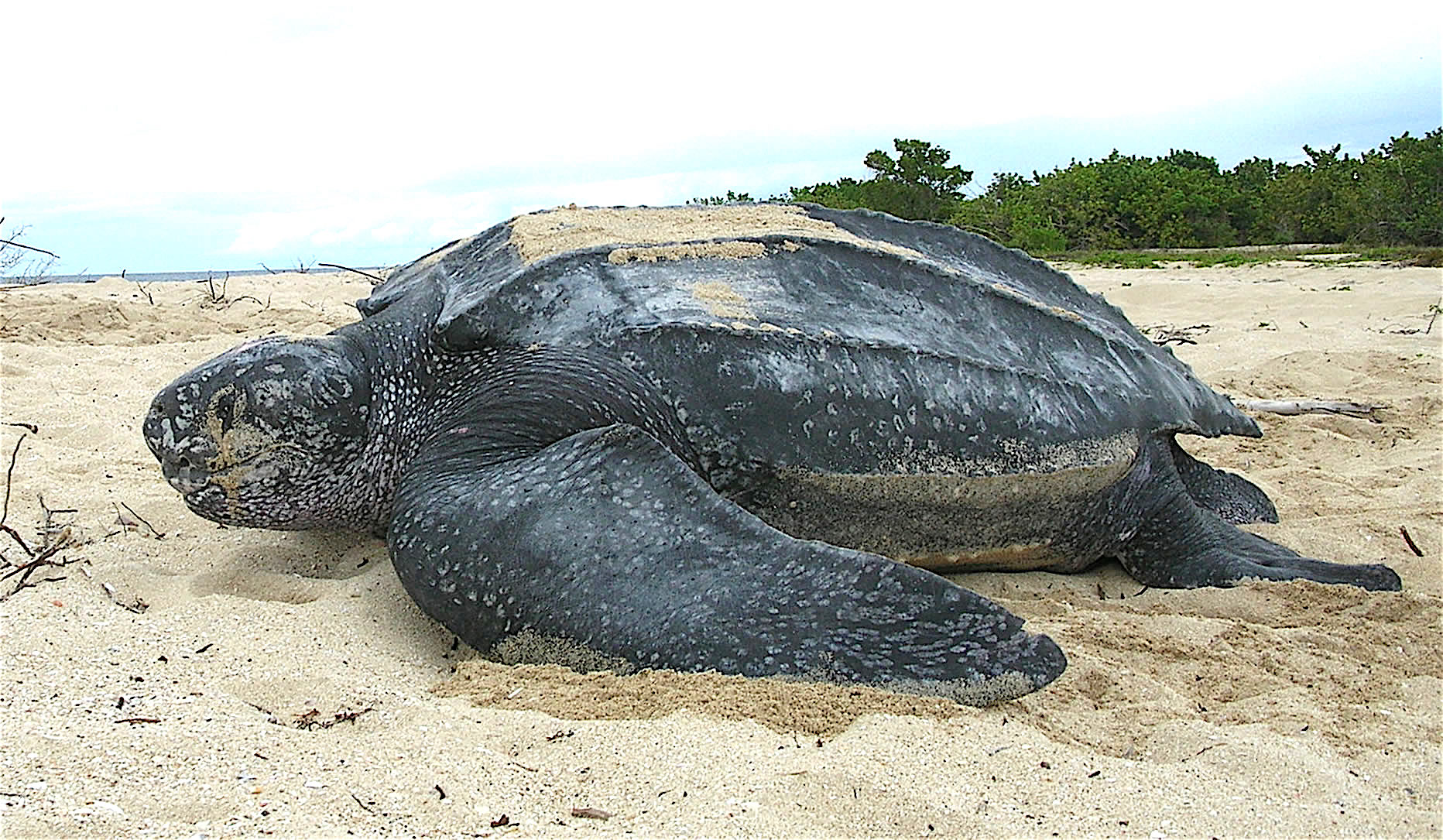
Lateral view

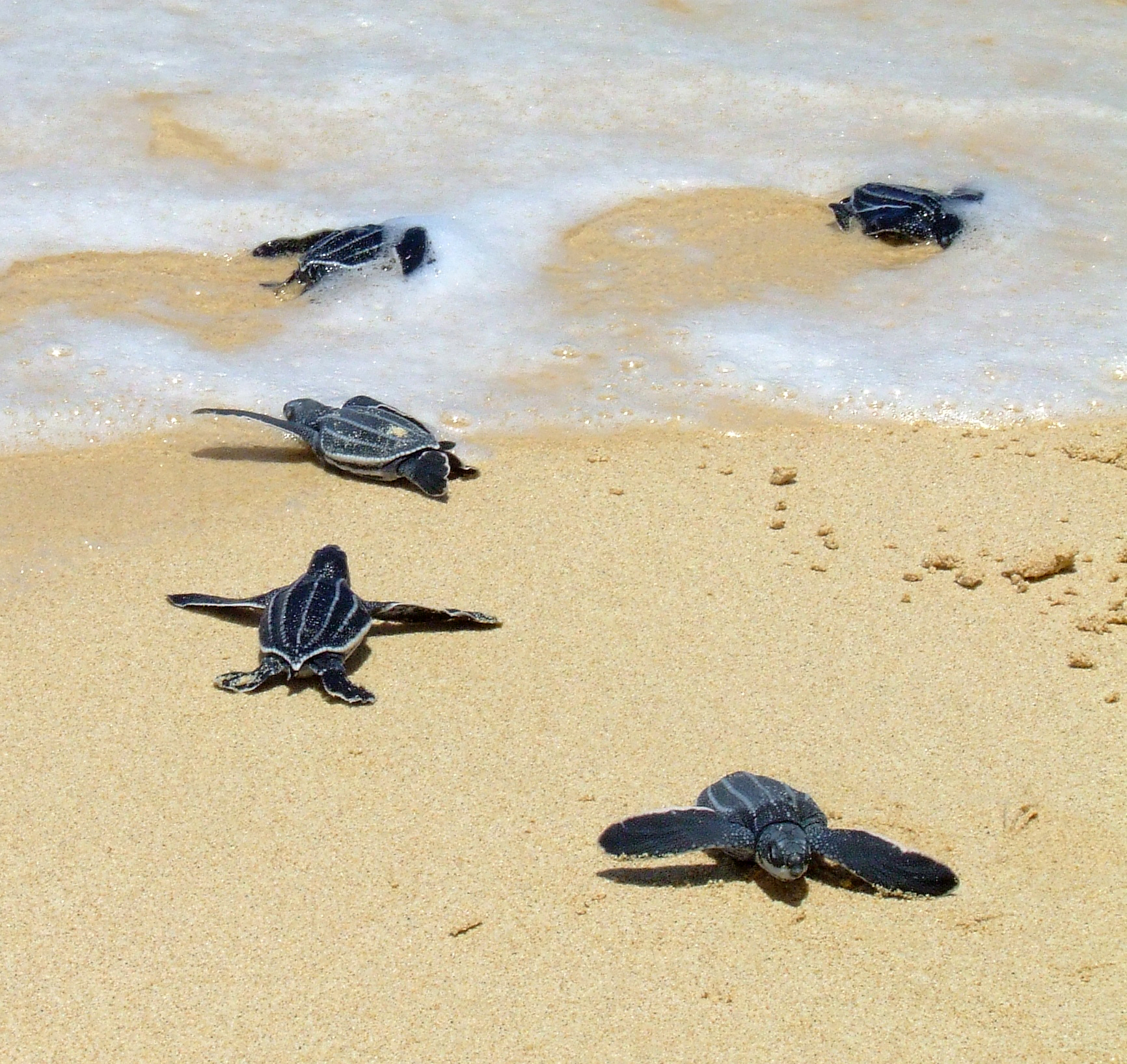
Crawling

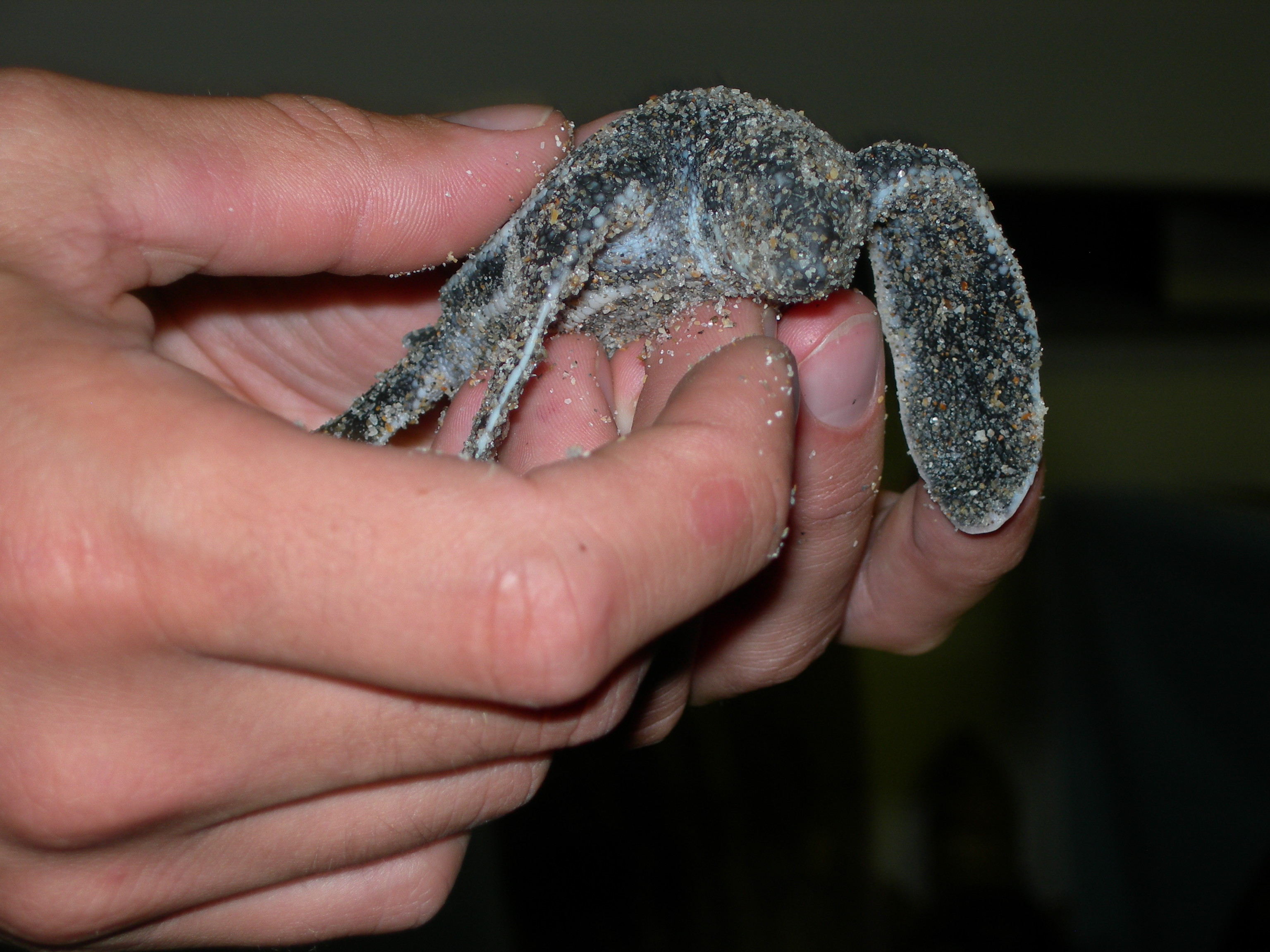
Hatchling

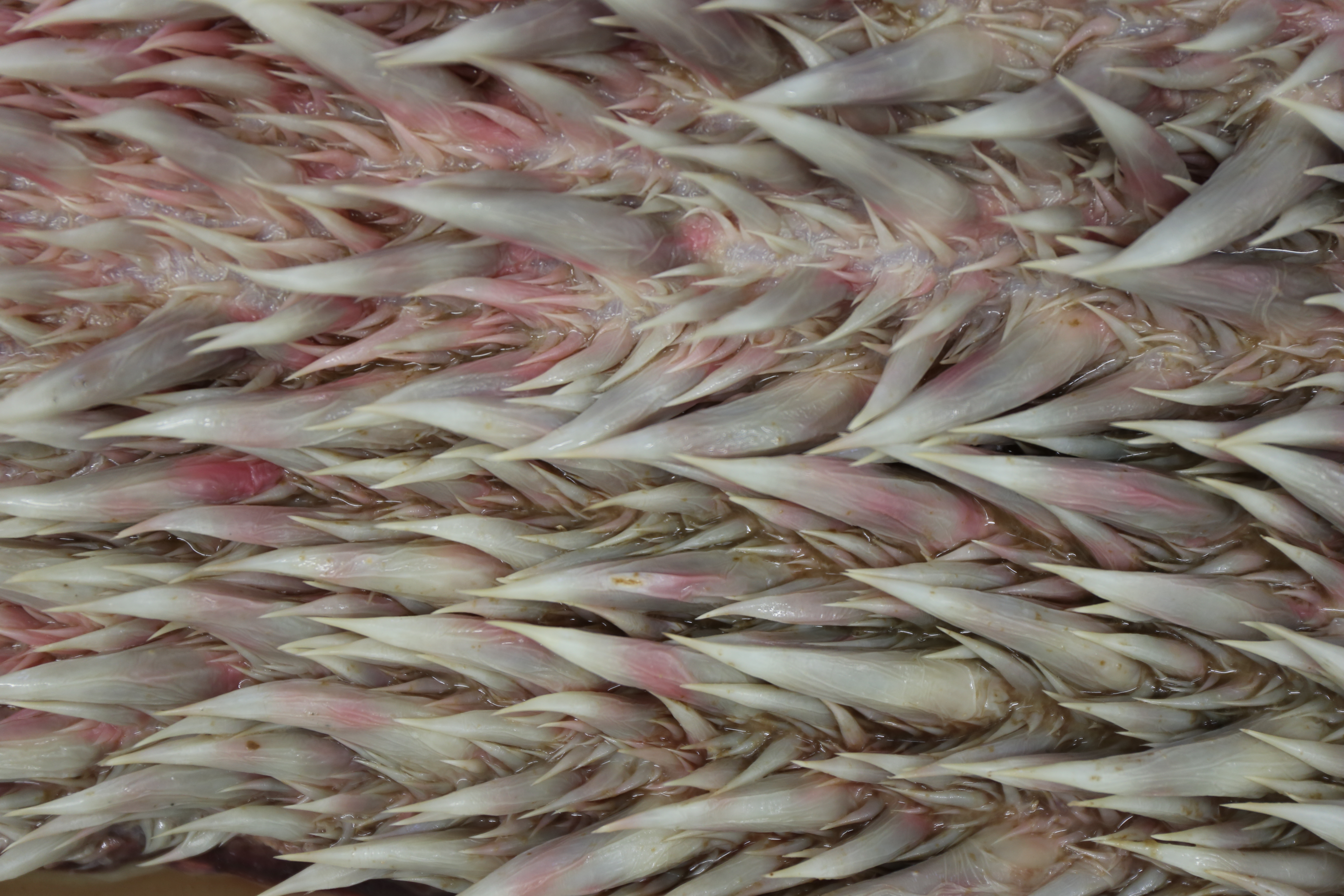
Oesophagus showing spines to retain prey

==== Family: Testudinidae (tortoises) ====
===== Genus: Geochelone =====
====== Geochelone elegans (Indian star tortoise / ഇന്ത്യൻ നക്ഷത്ര ആമ) ======
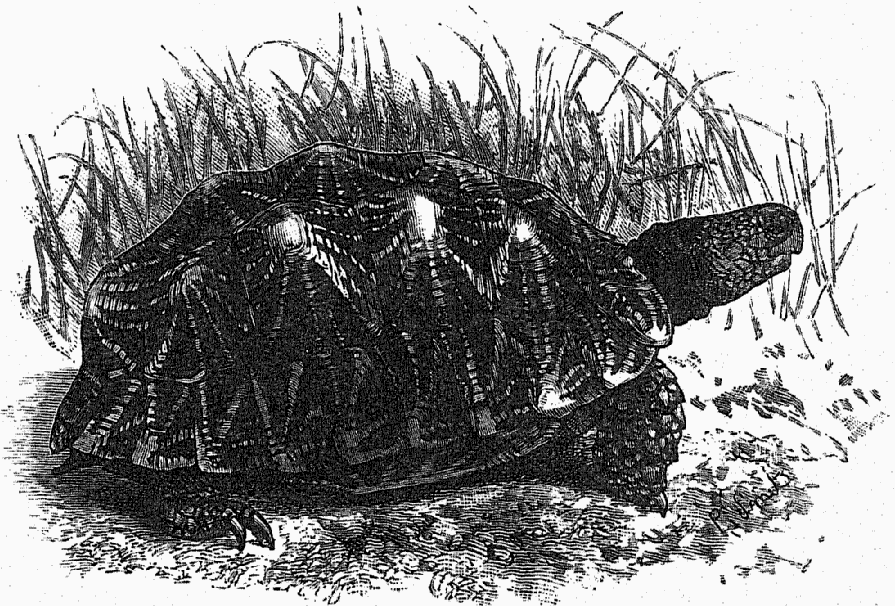
Illustration

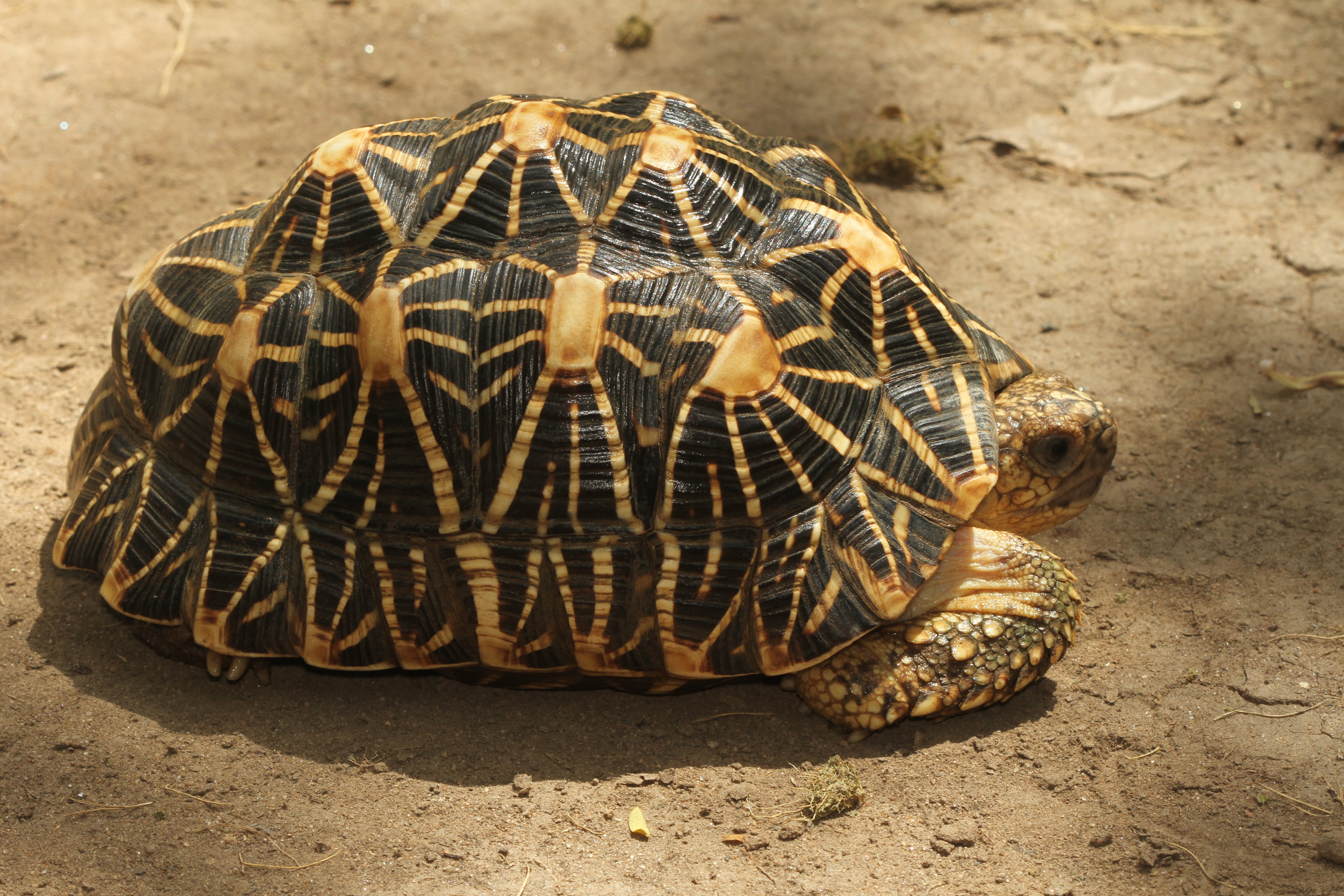
Lateral view

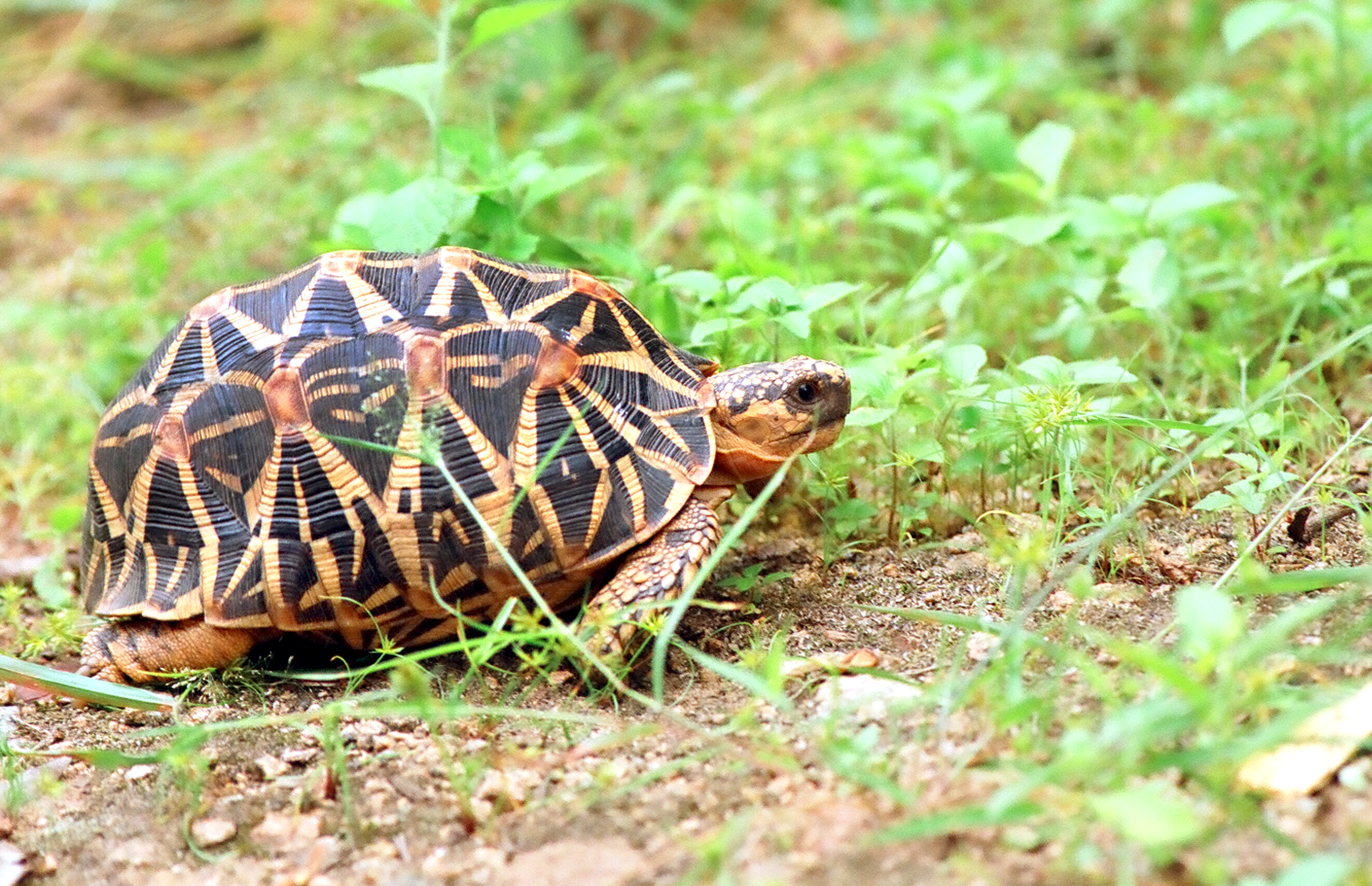
Lateral view

===== Genus: Indotestudo =====
====== Indotestudo travancorica (Travancore tortoise / കാട്ടാമ) ======
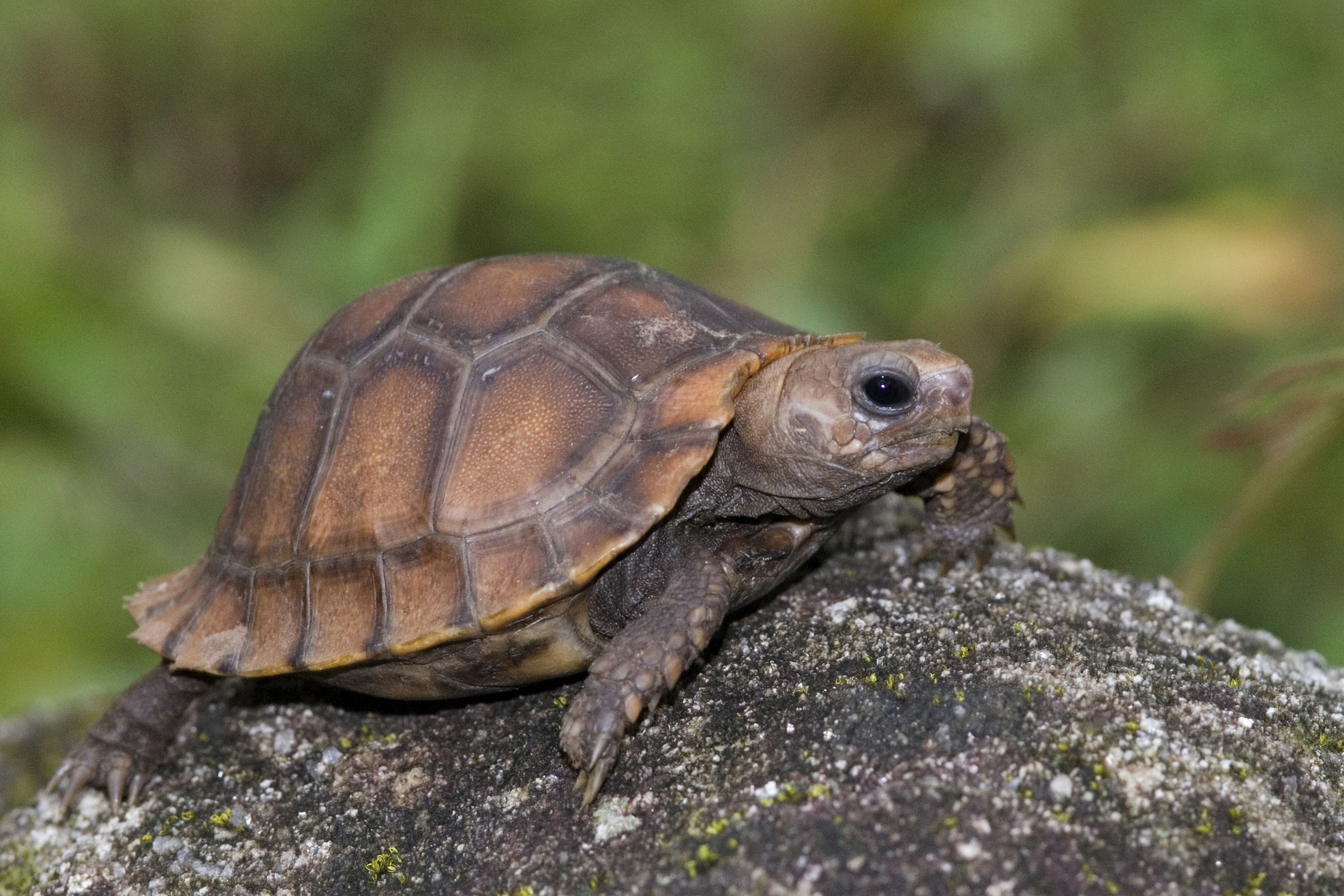
Lateral view

==== Family: Trionychidae (softshell turtles) ====
===== Genus: Nilssonia =====
====== Nilssonia leithii (Leith's softshell turtle) ======
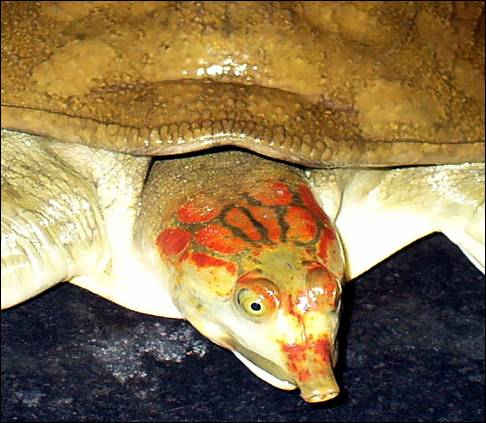
Head

===== Genus: Lissemys =====
====== Lissemys punctata (Indian flapshell turtle / വെള്ളാമ) ======
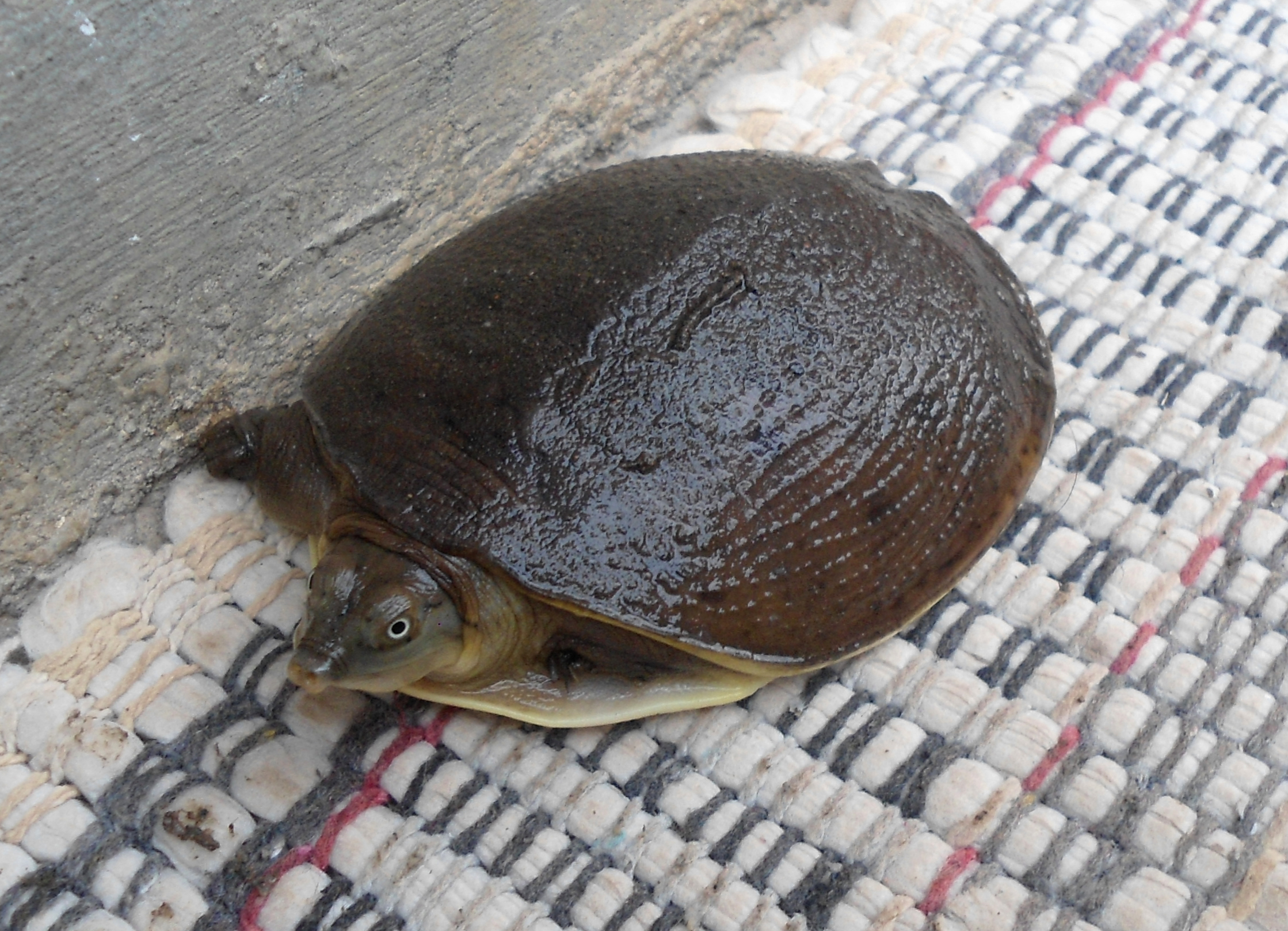
Dorsal view

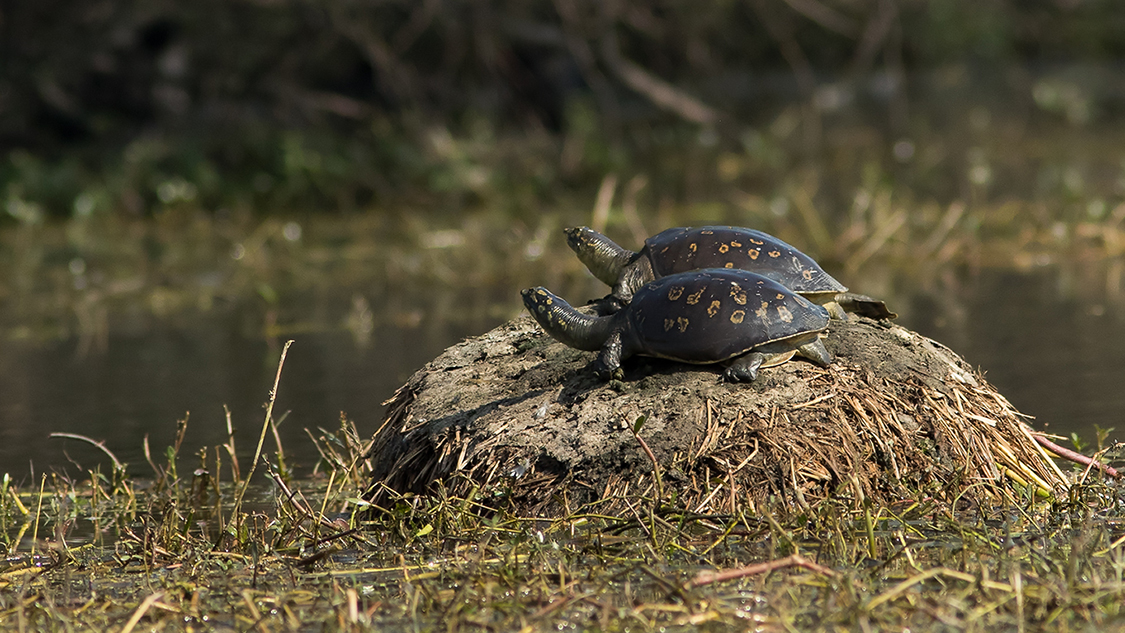
Lateral view

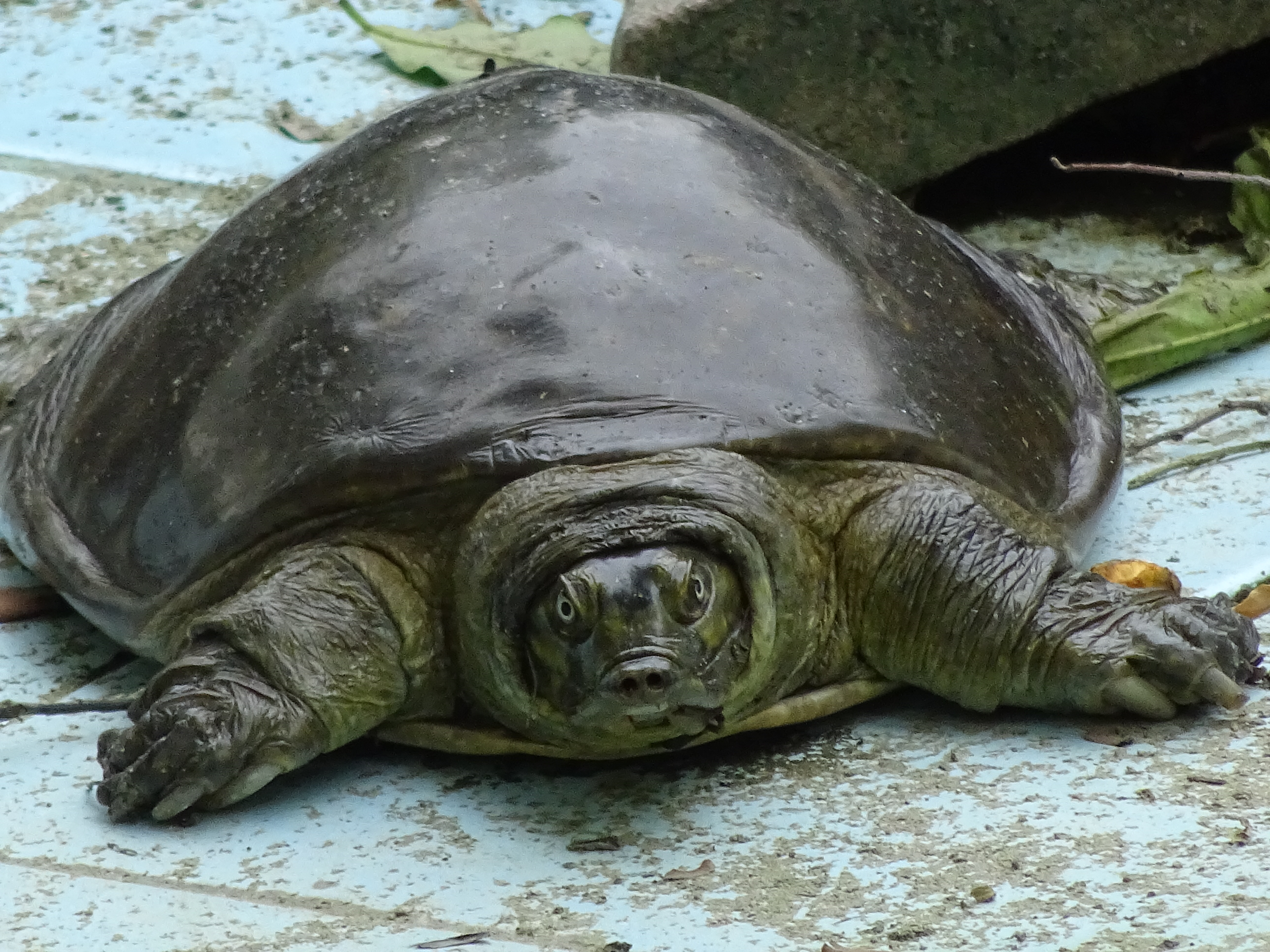
Front view

===== Genus: Pelochelys =====
====== Pelochelys cantorii (Cantor's giant softshell turtle / ഭീമനാമ) ======
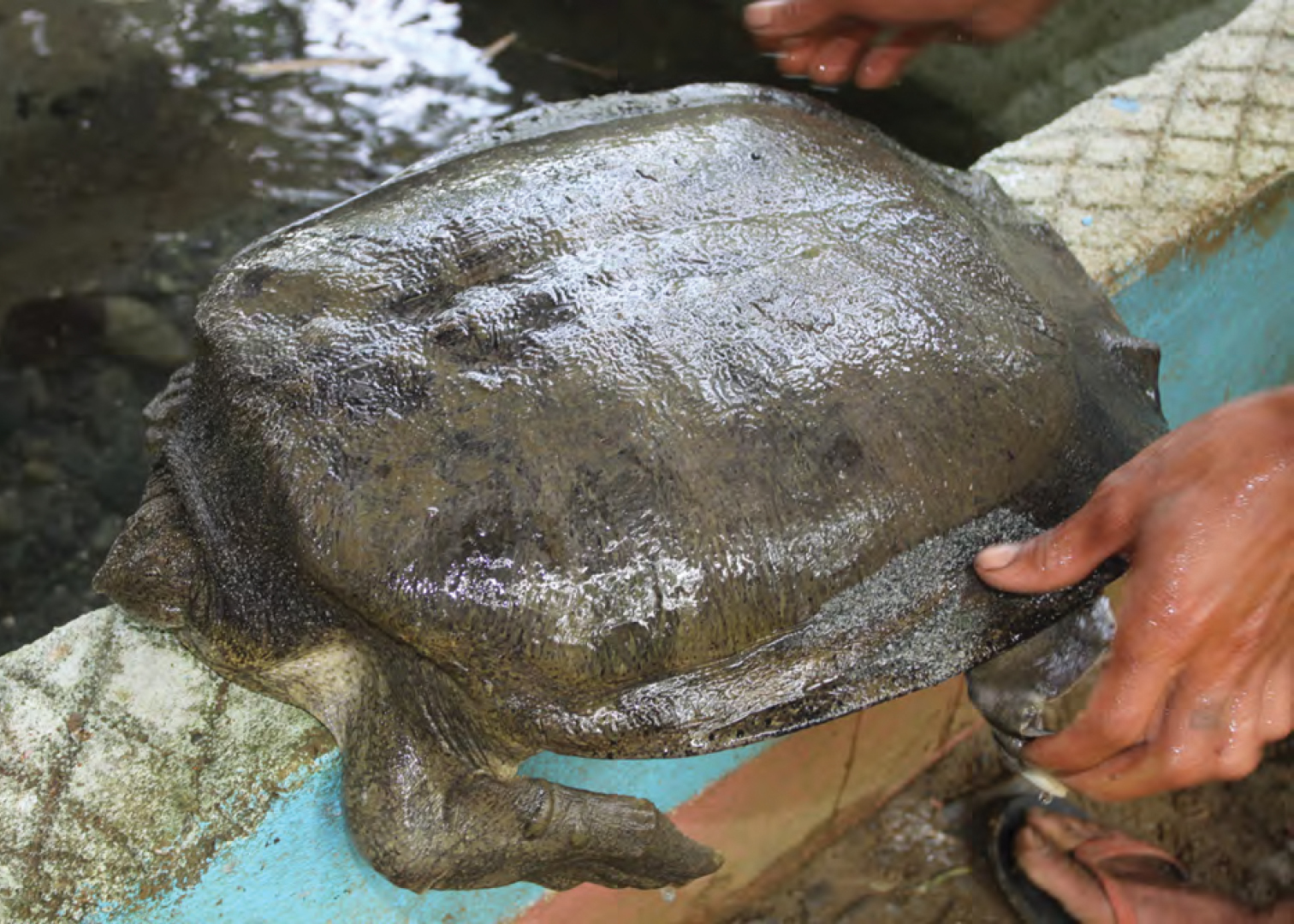
Dorsal view

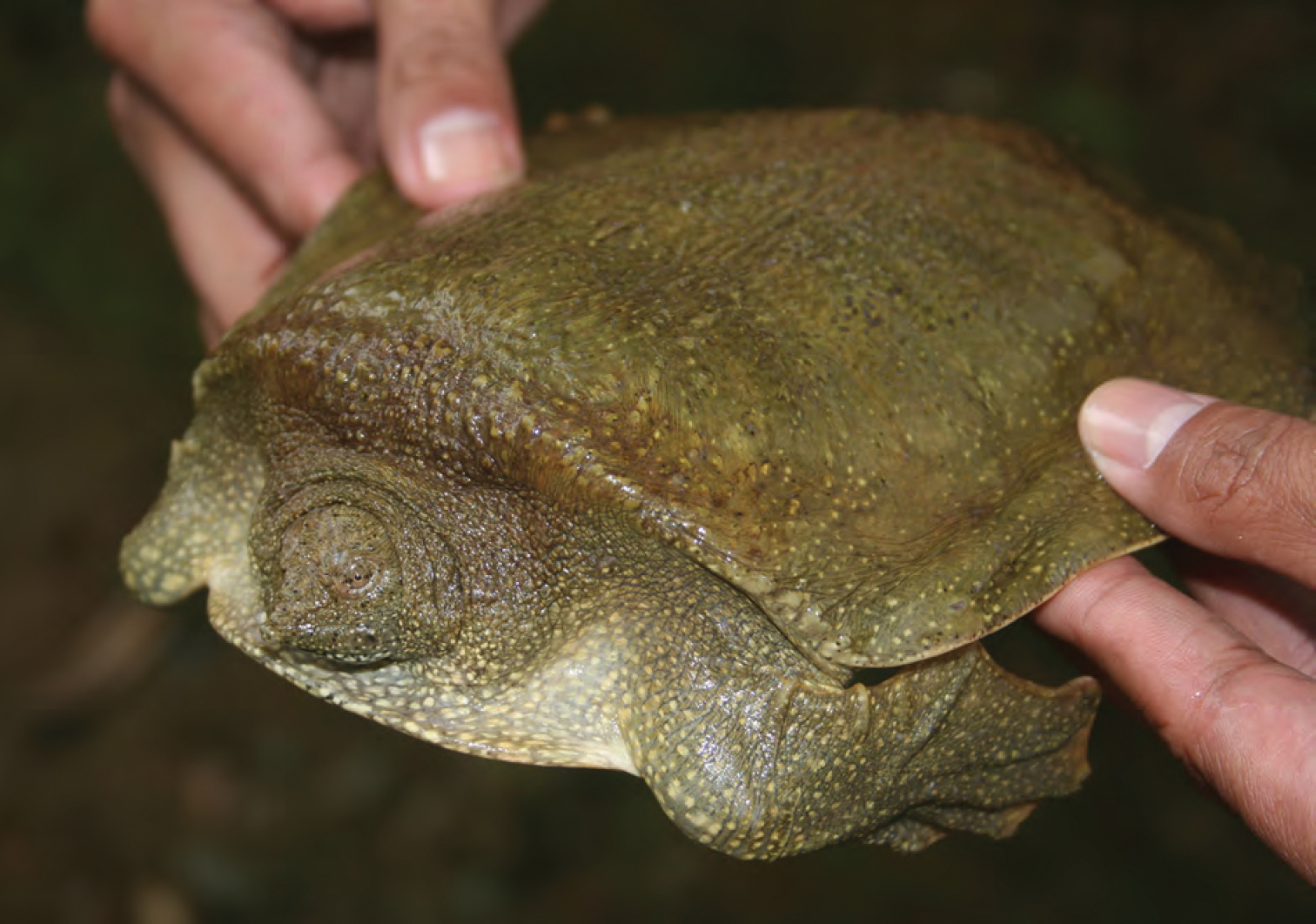
Lateral view

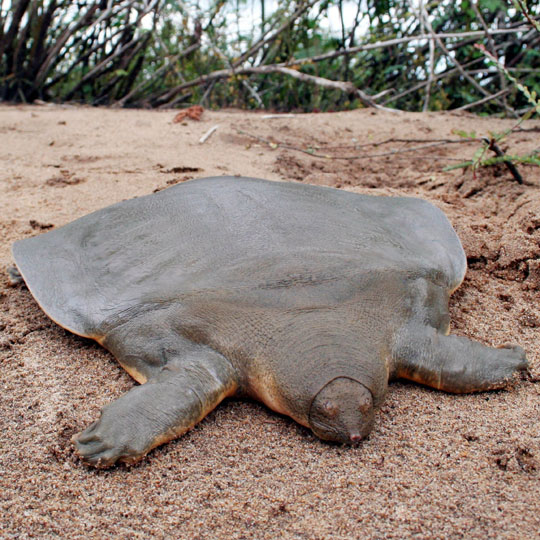
Front view

===== Genus: Chitra =====
====== Chitra indica (Indian narrow-headed softshell turtle / ചിത്രയാമ) ======
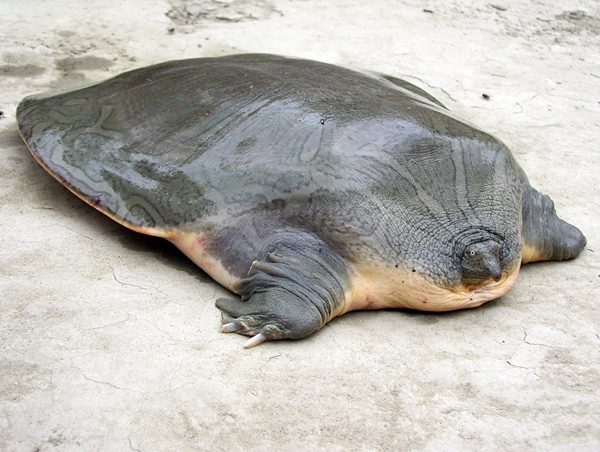
Lateral view

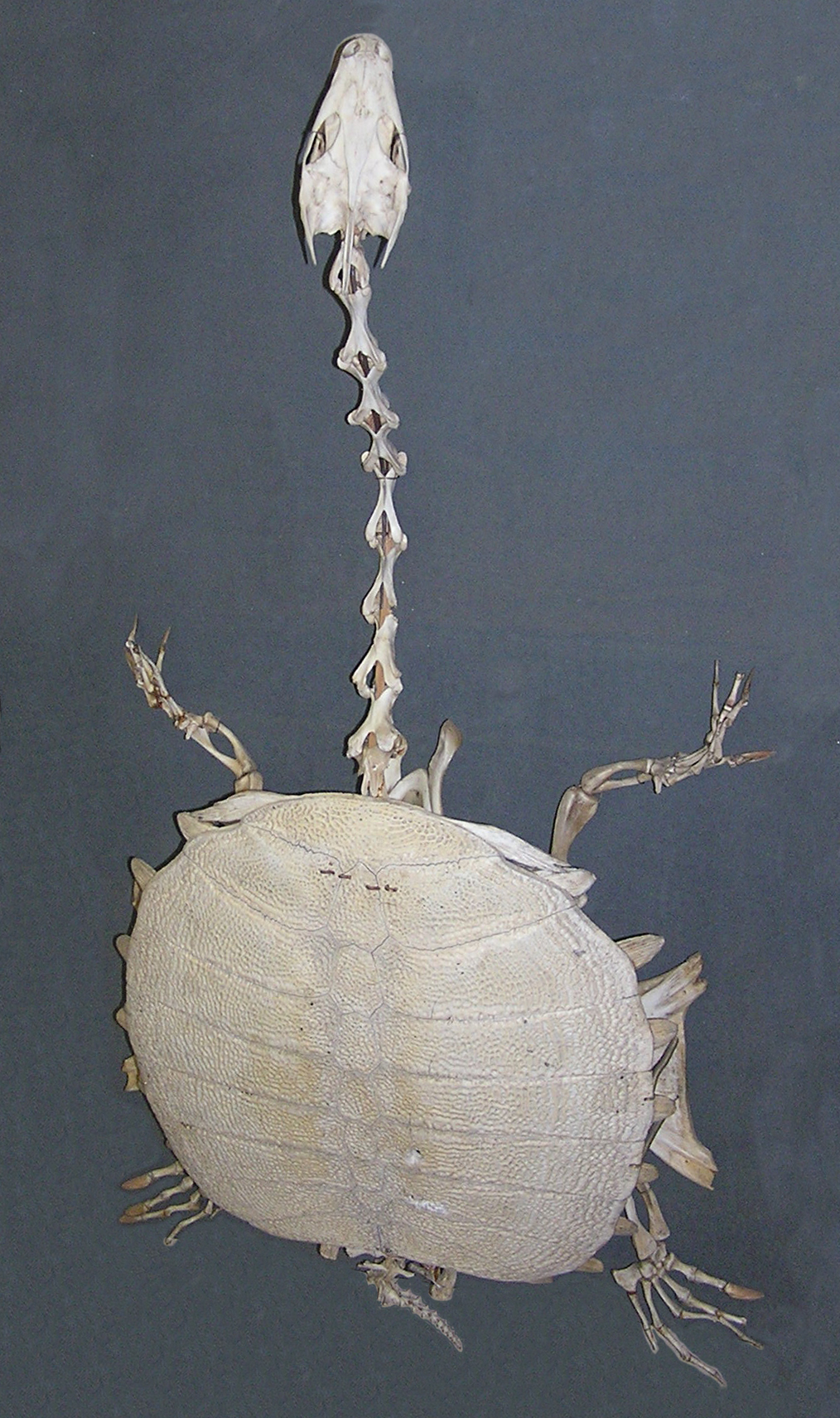
Skeleton

== Order: Squamata (scaled reptiles) ==
=== Suborder: Iguania ===
==== Family: Agamidae (lizards) ====
===== Genus: Calotes =====
====== Calotes calotes (common green forest lizard / പച്ചയോന്ത്) ======
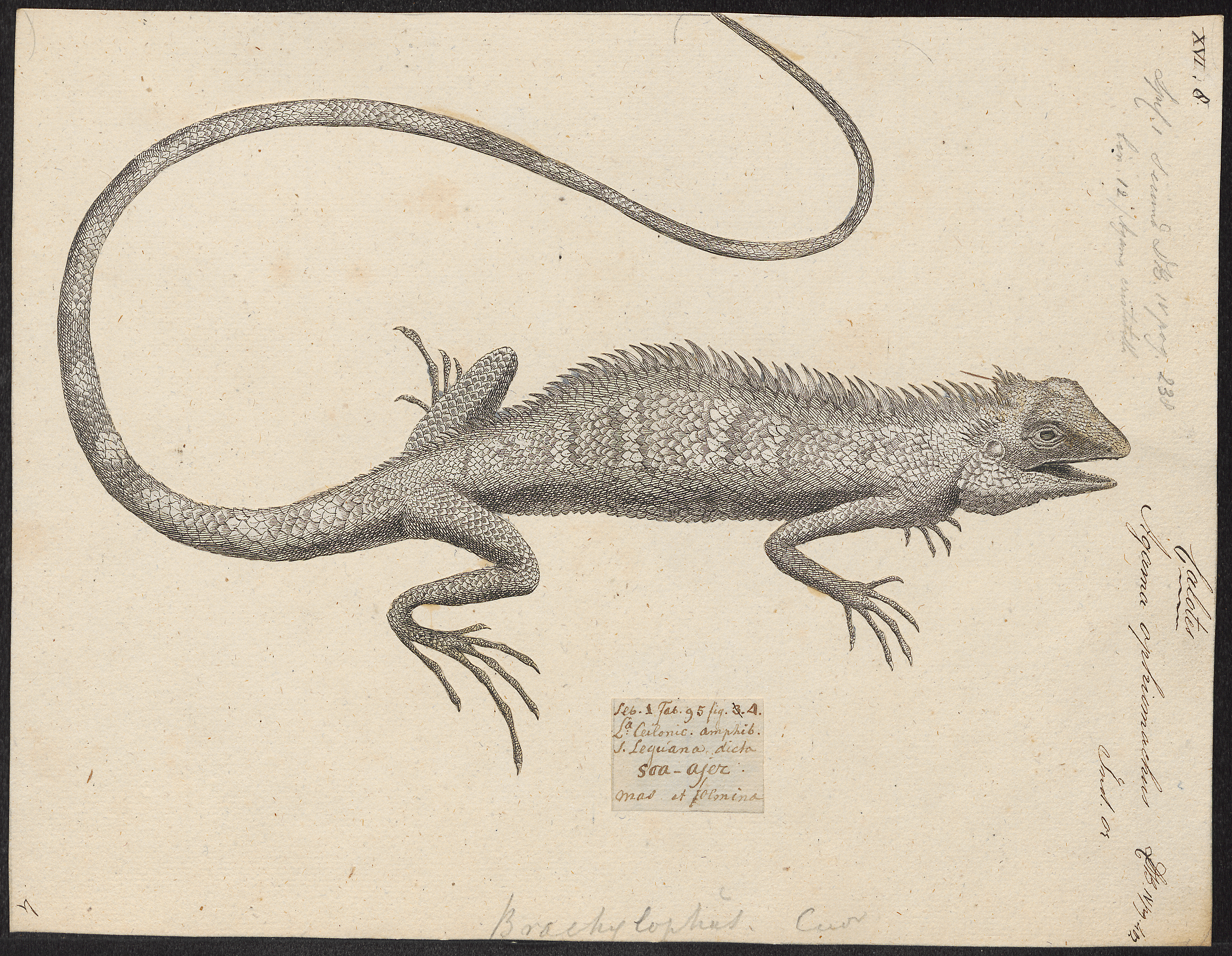
Illustration

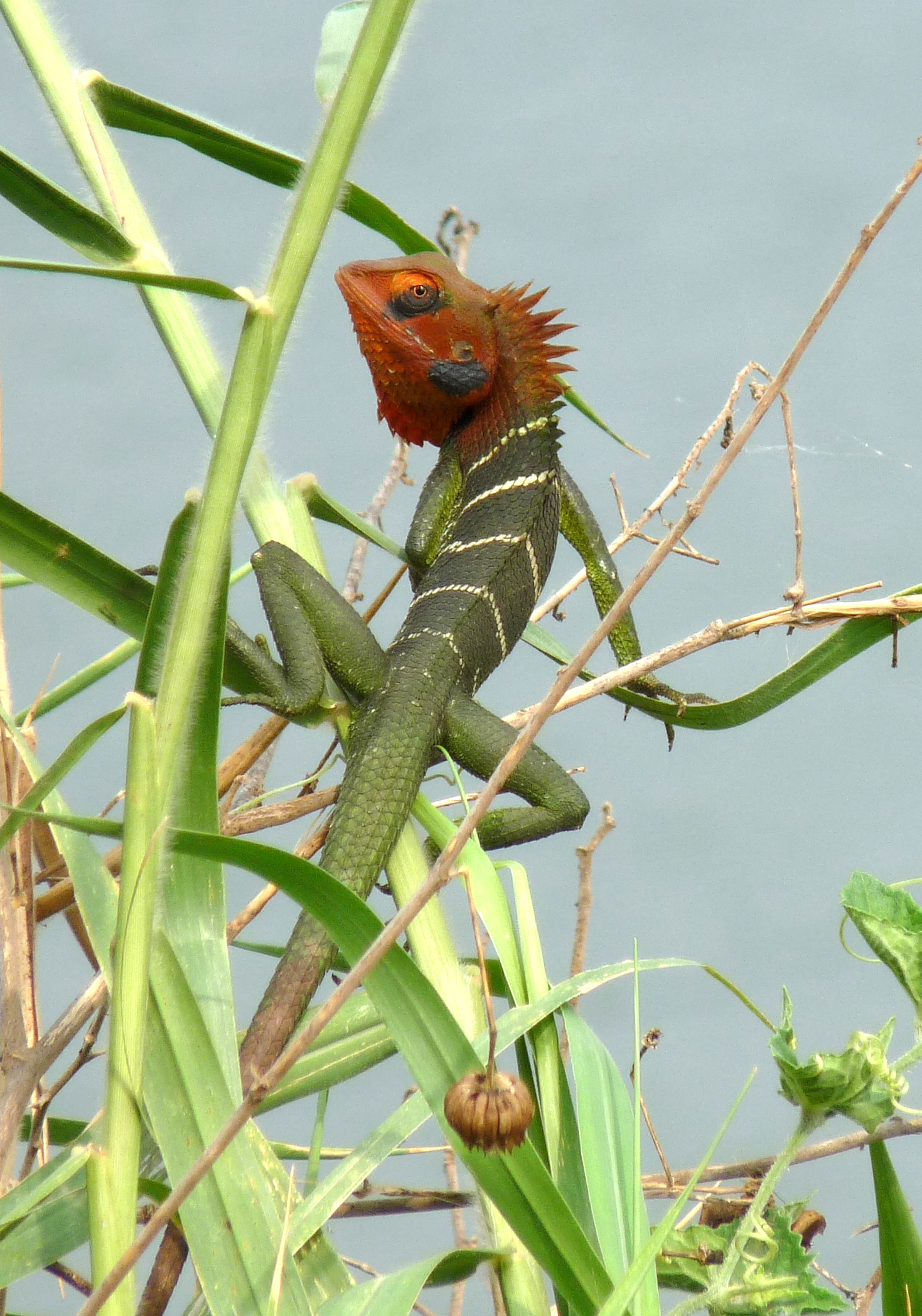
Dorsal view

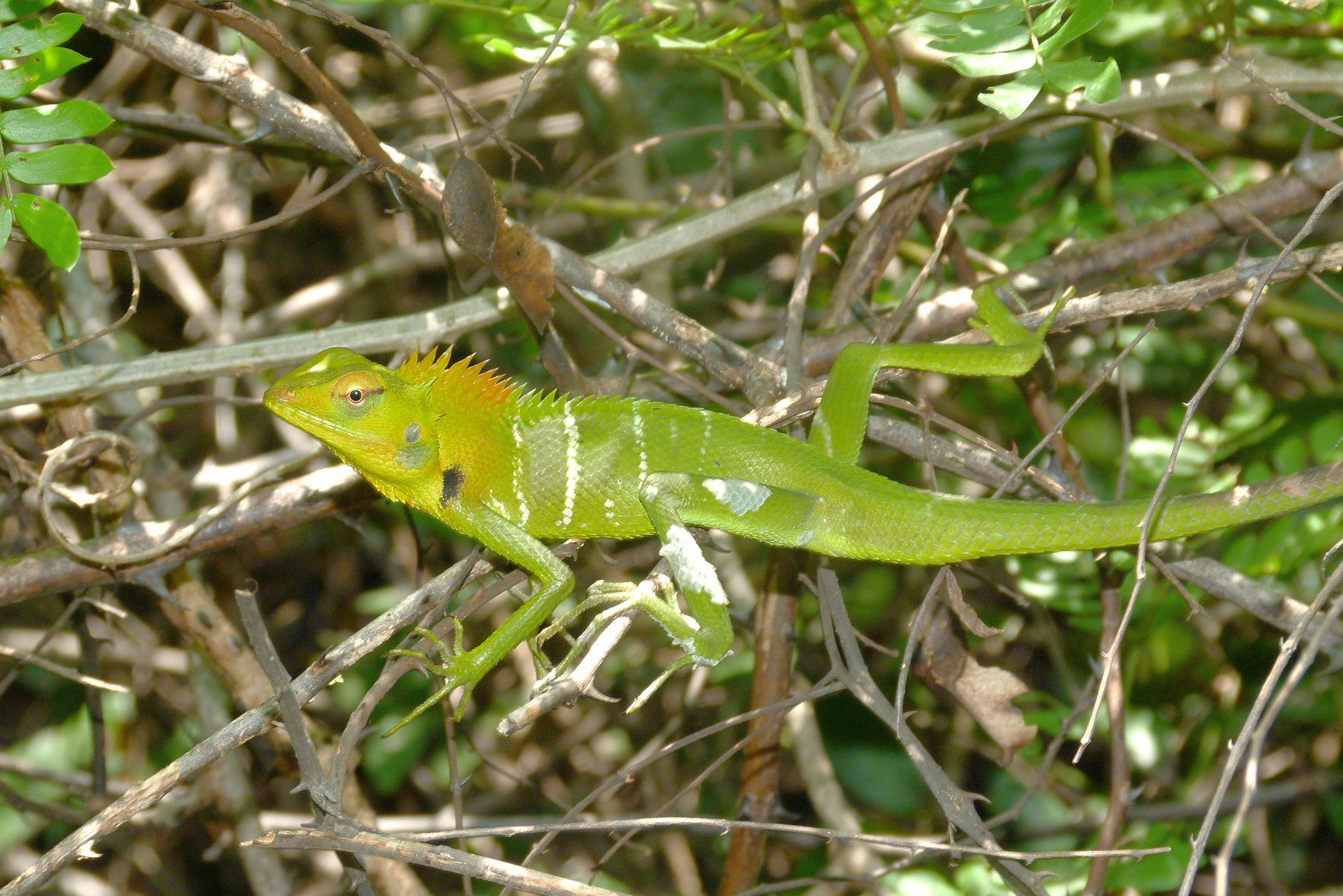
Lateral view

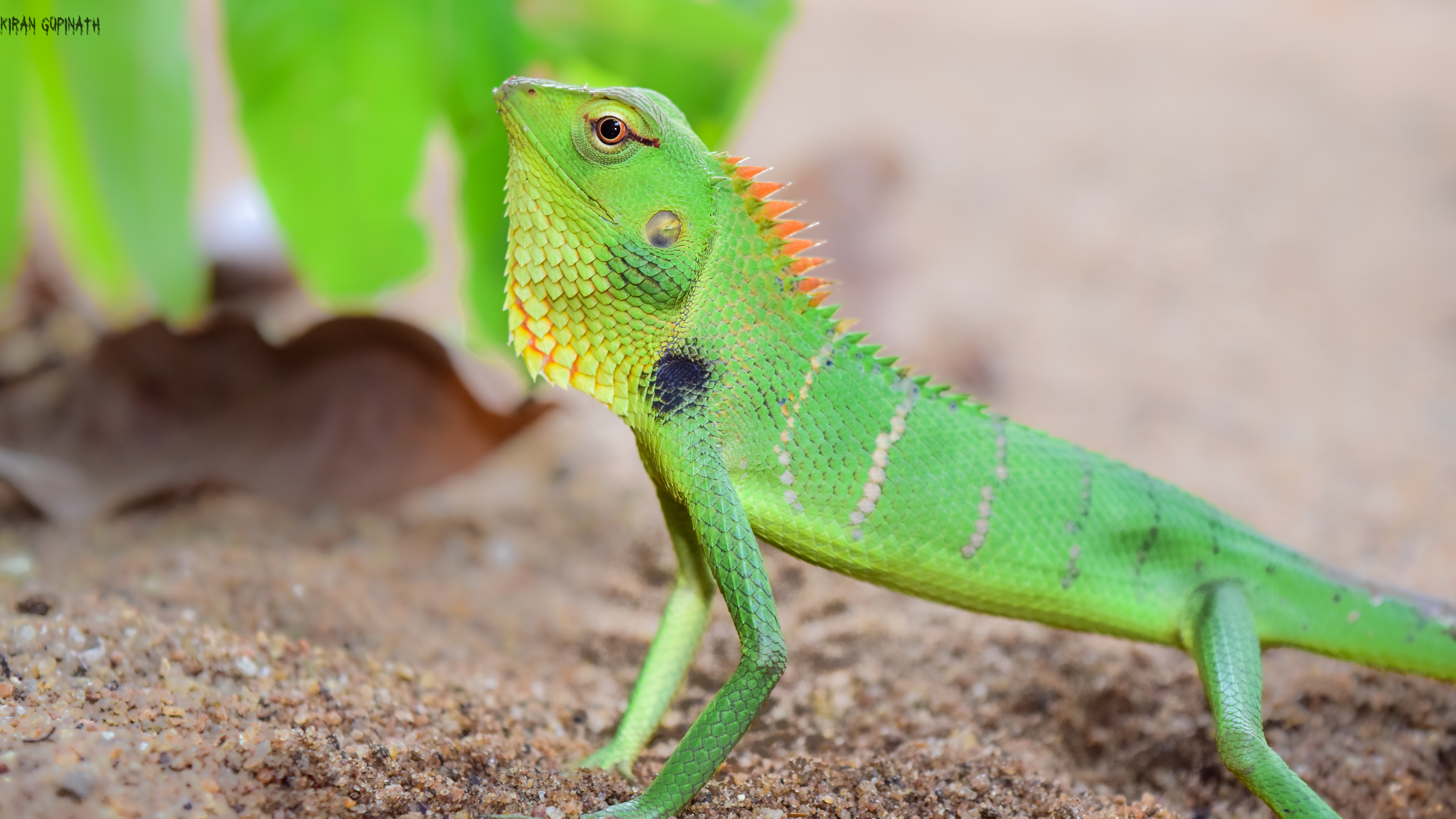
Head

====== Calotes grandisquamis (large-scaled forest lizard / കാട്ടുപച്ചയോന്ത്) ======
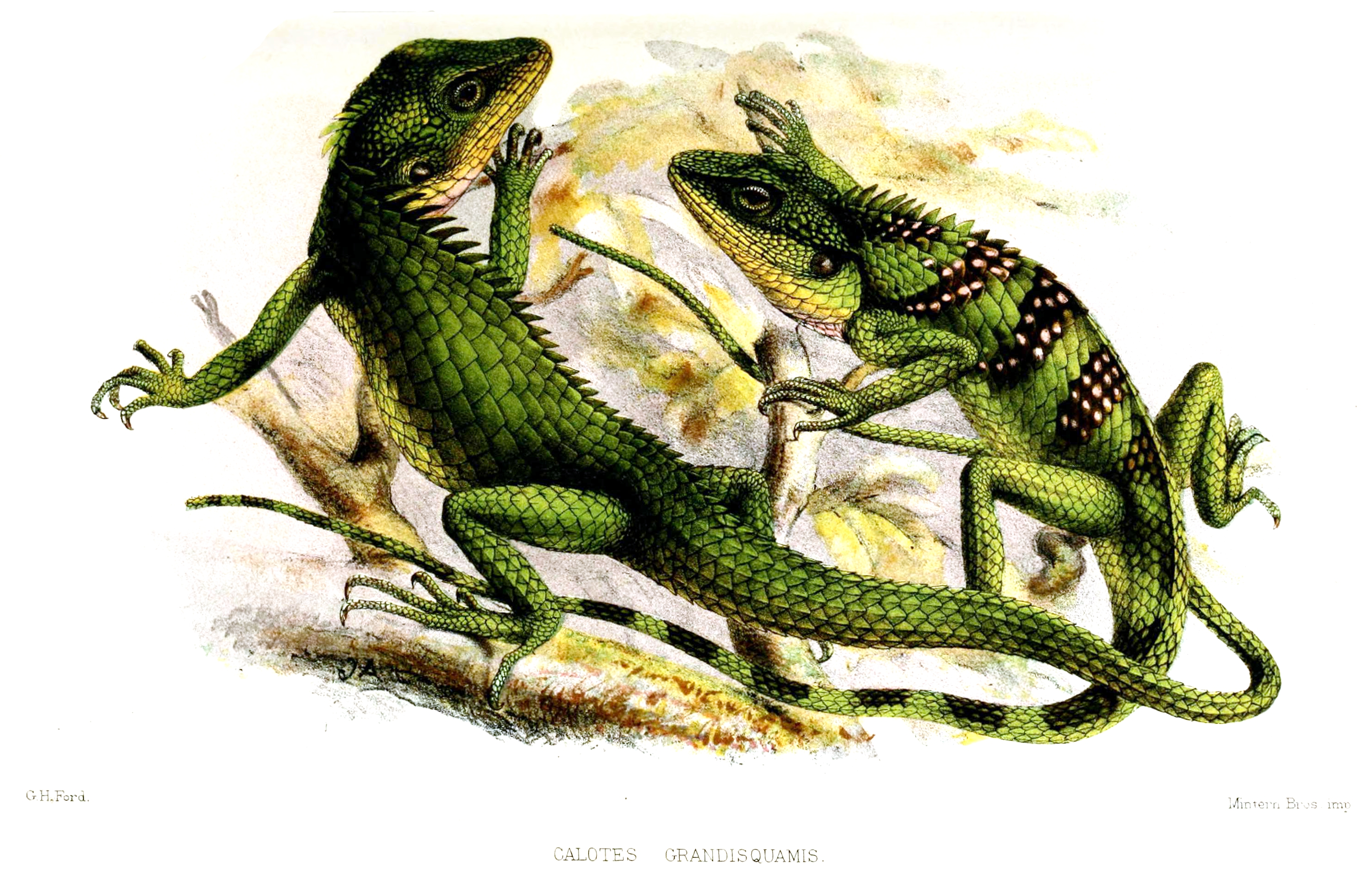
Illustration

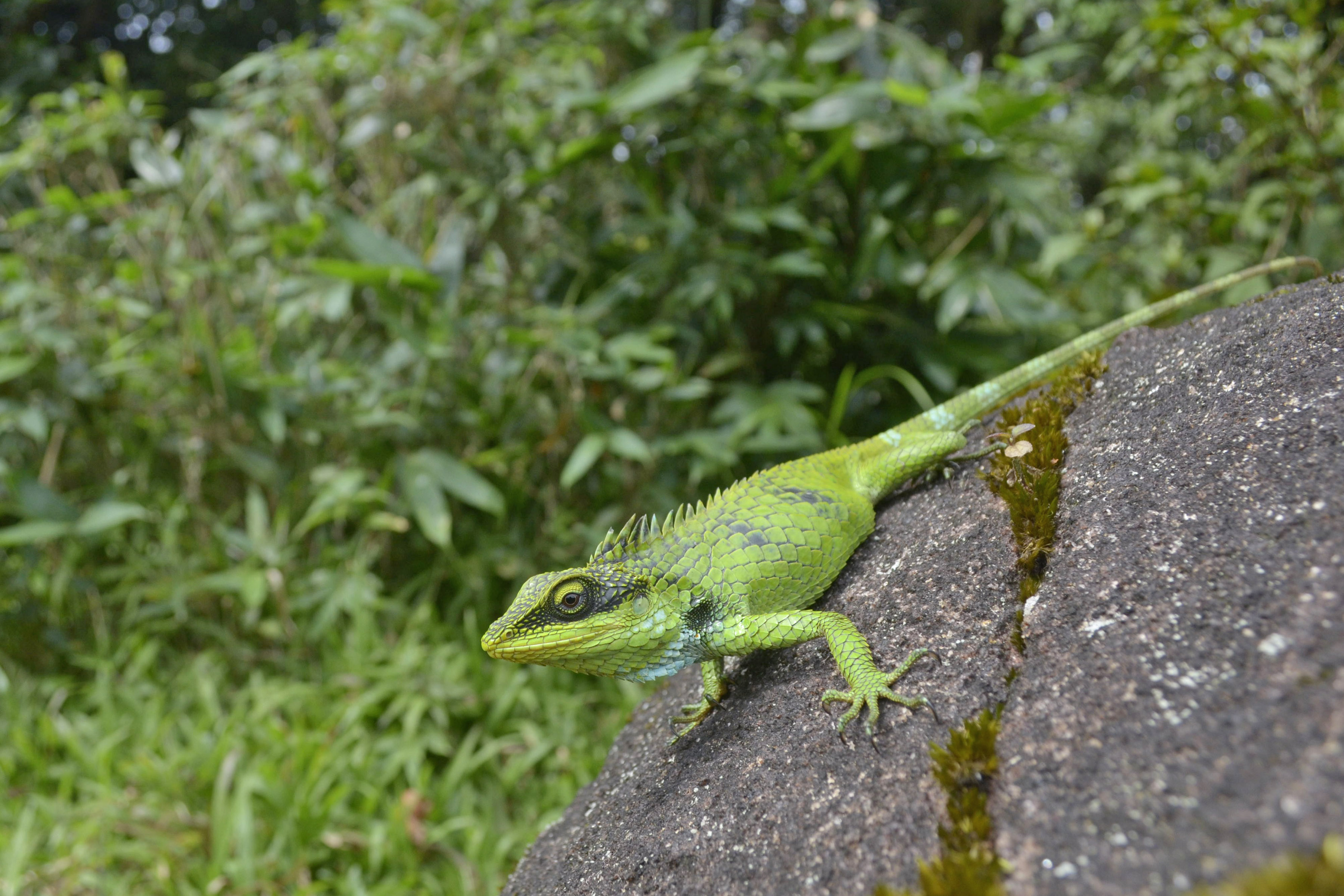
Lateral view

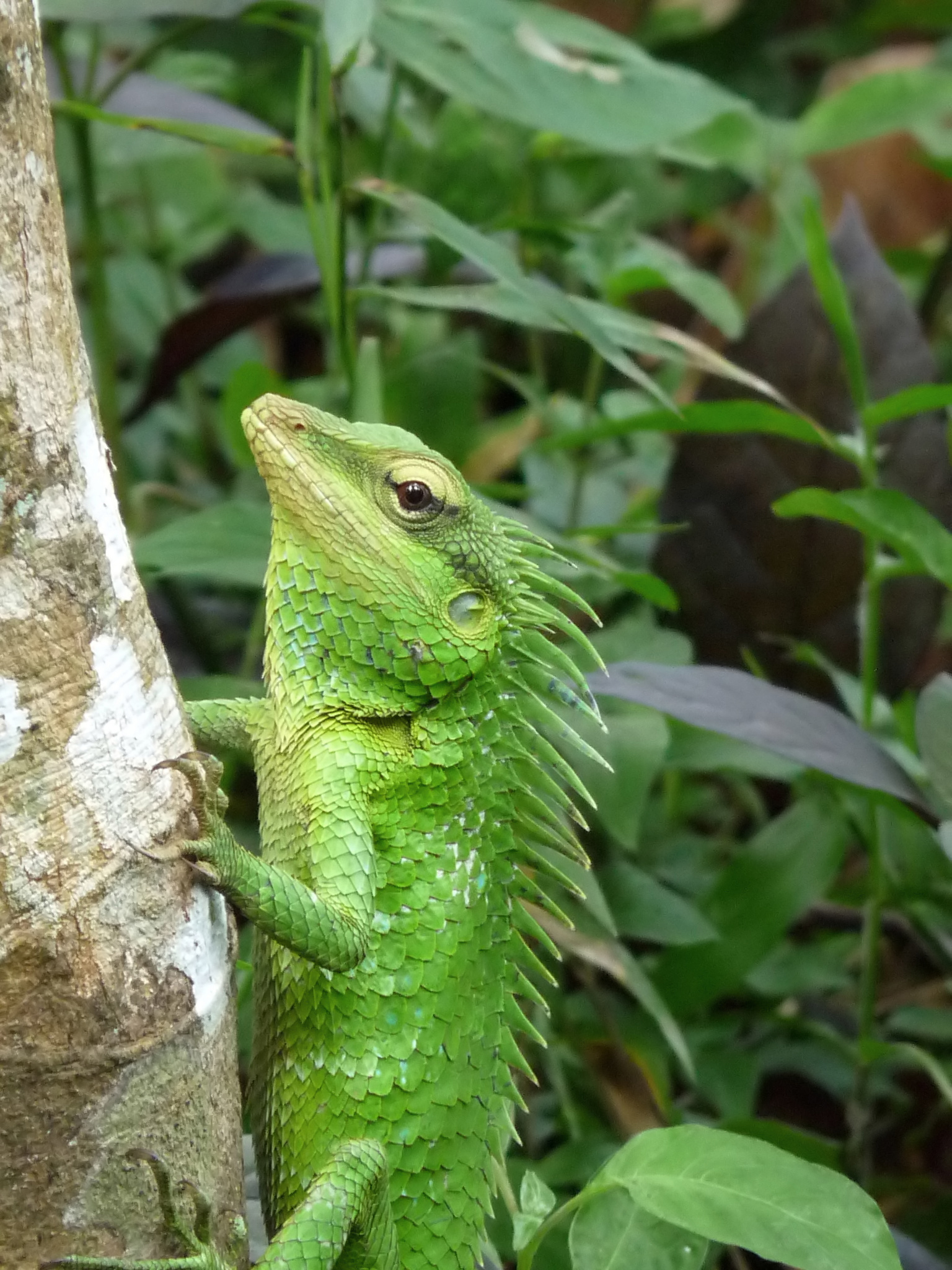
Head

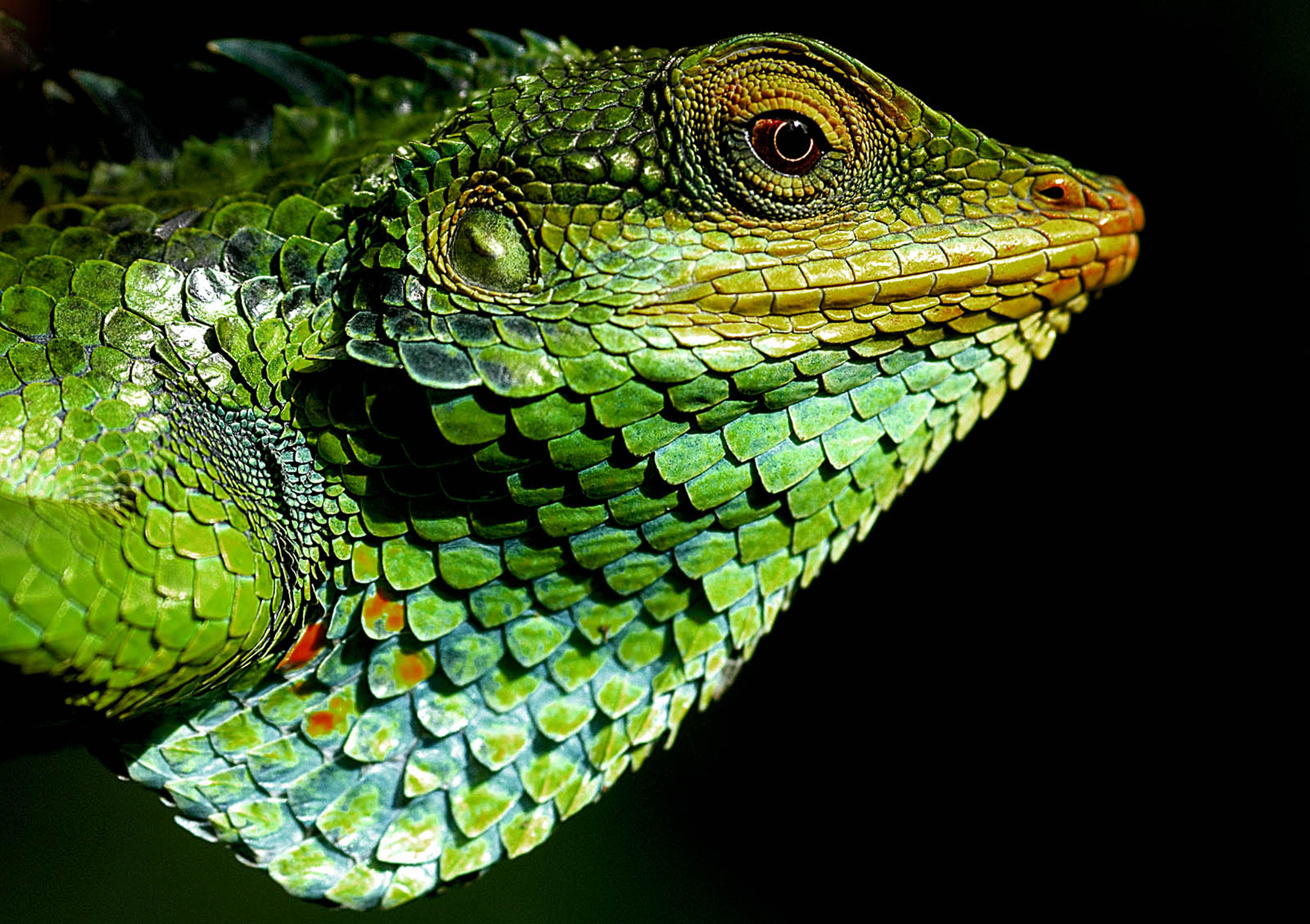
Head

====== Calotes nemoricola (Nilgiri forest lizard / നീലഗിരി ഓന്ത്) ======
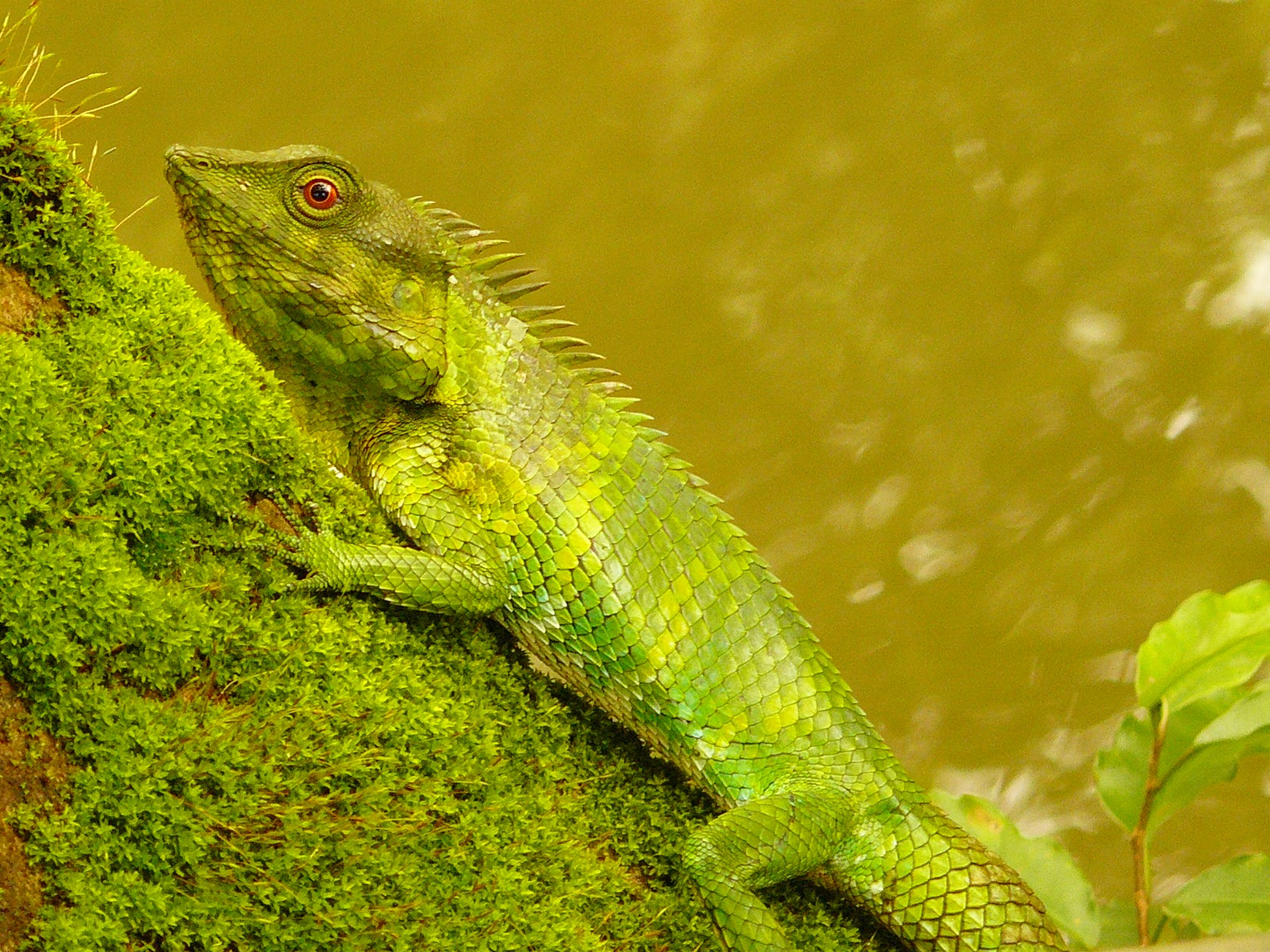
Lateral view

====== Calotes versicolor (oriental garden lizard / ഓറിയന്റൽ ഗാർഡൻ ലിസാർഡ്) ======
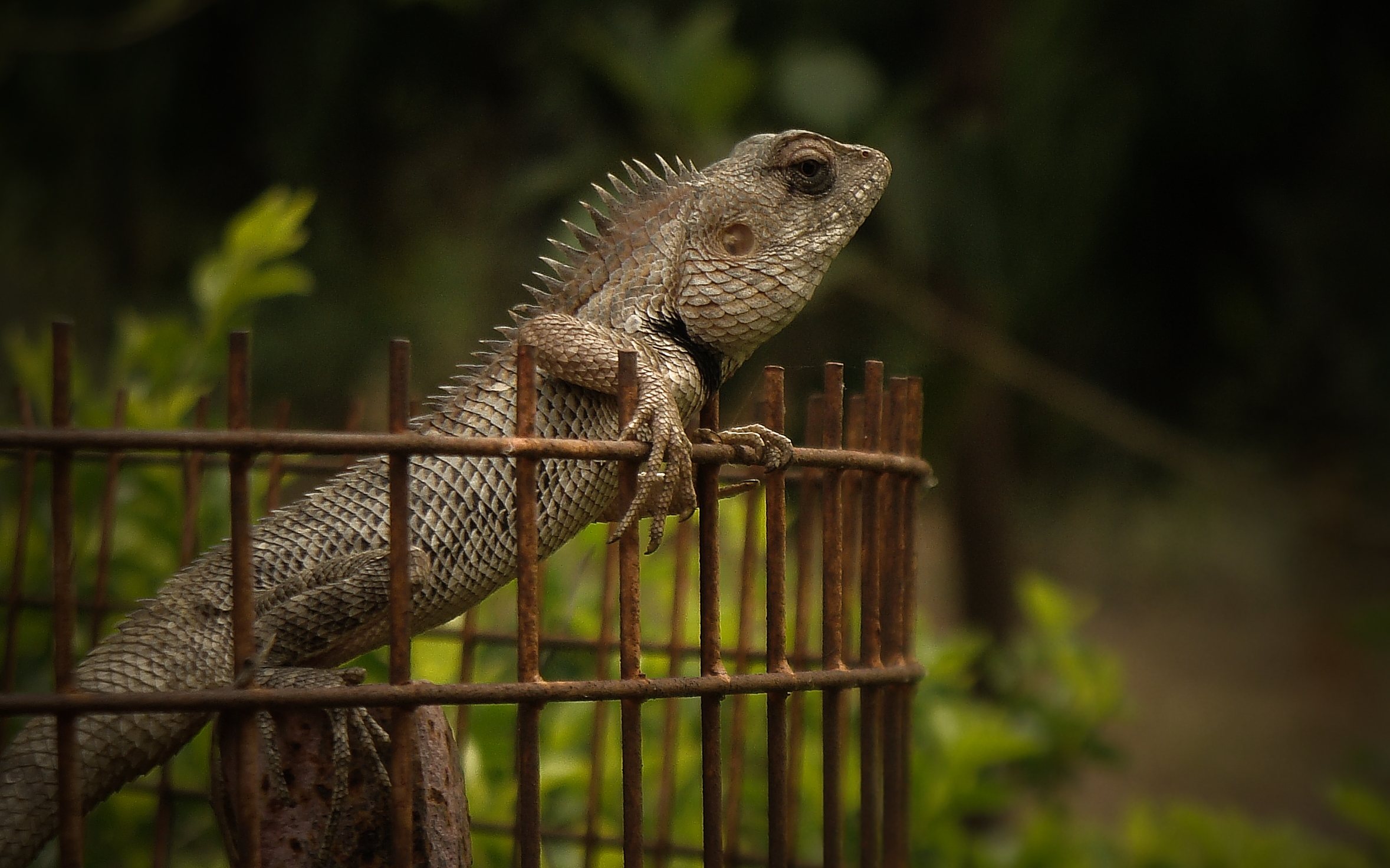
Lateral view

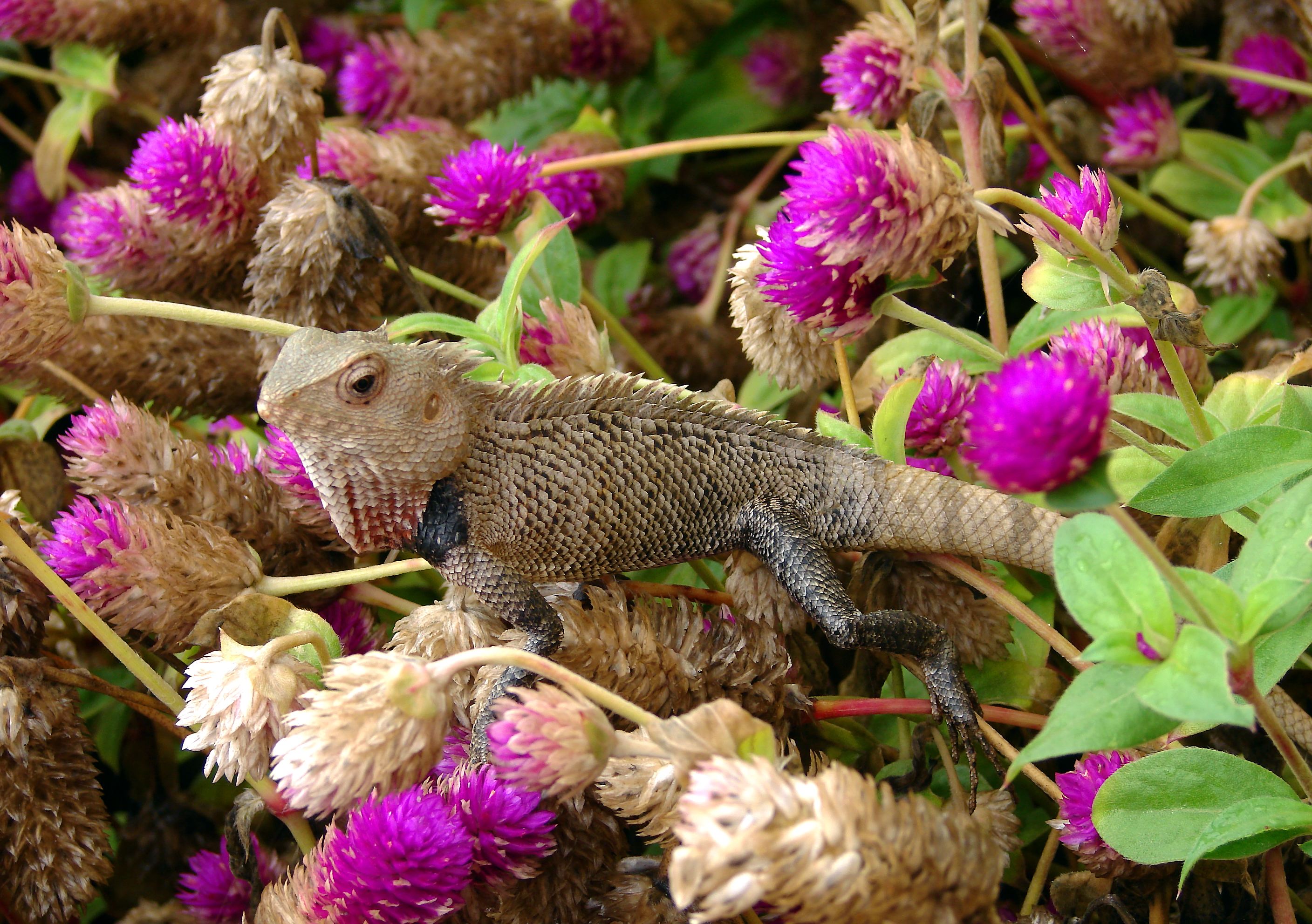
Lateral view

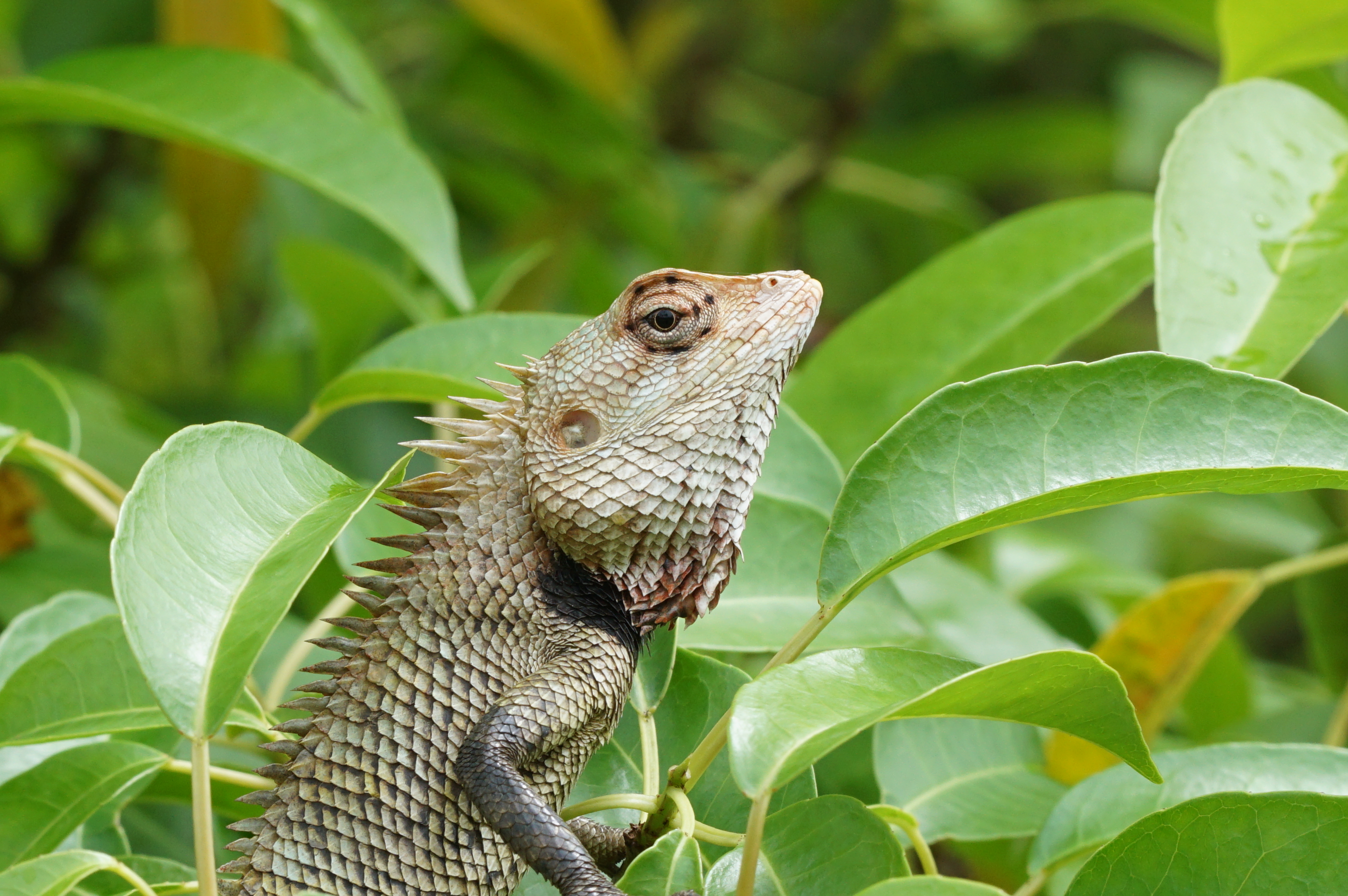
Head

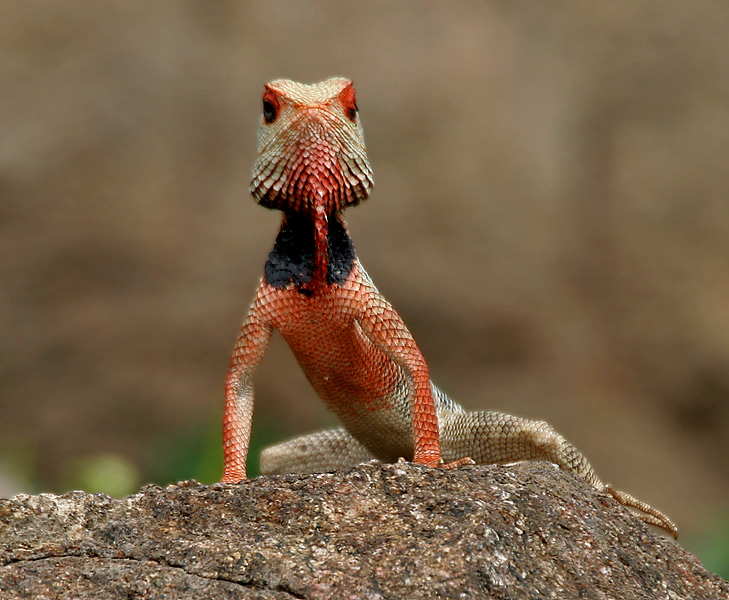
Male in breeding season

===== Genus: Monilesaurus =====
Monilesaurus acanthocephalus (Spiny headed lizard)

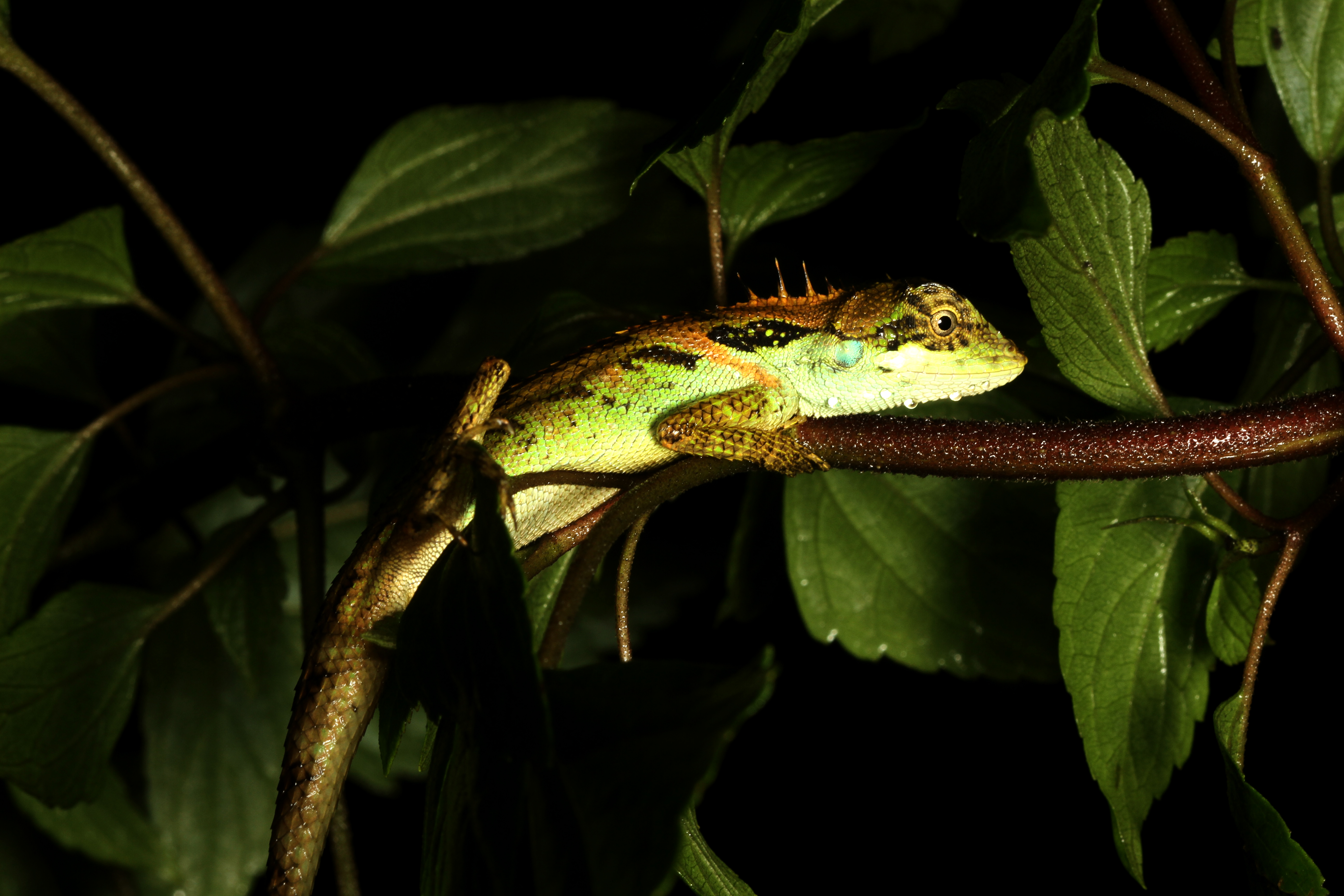
Resting individual

====== Monilesaurus ellioti (Elliot's forest lizard / മുള്ളോന്ത്) ======
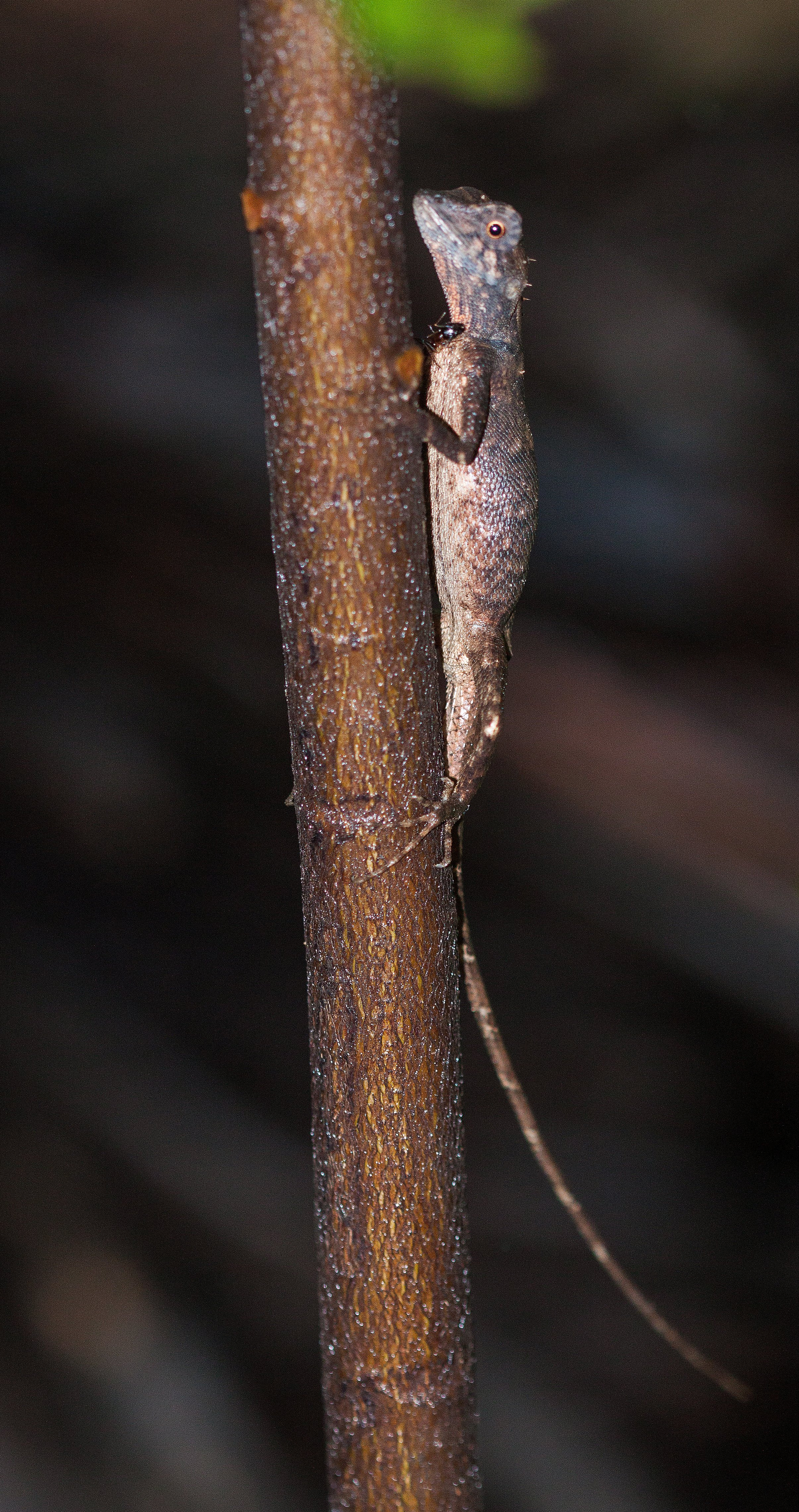
Lateral view

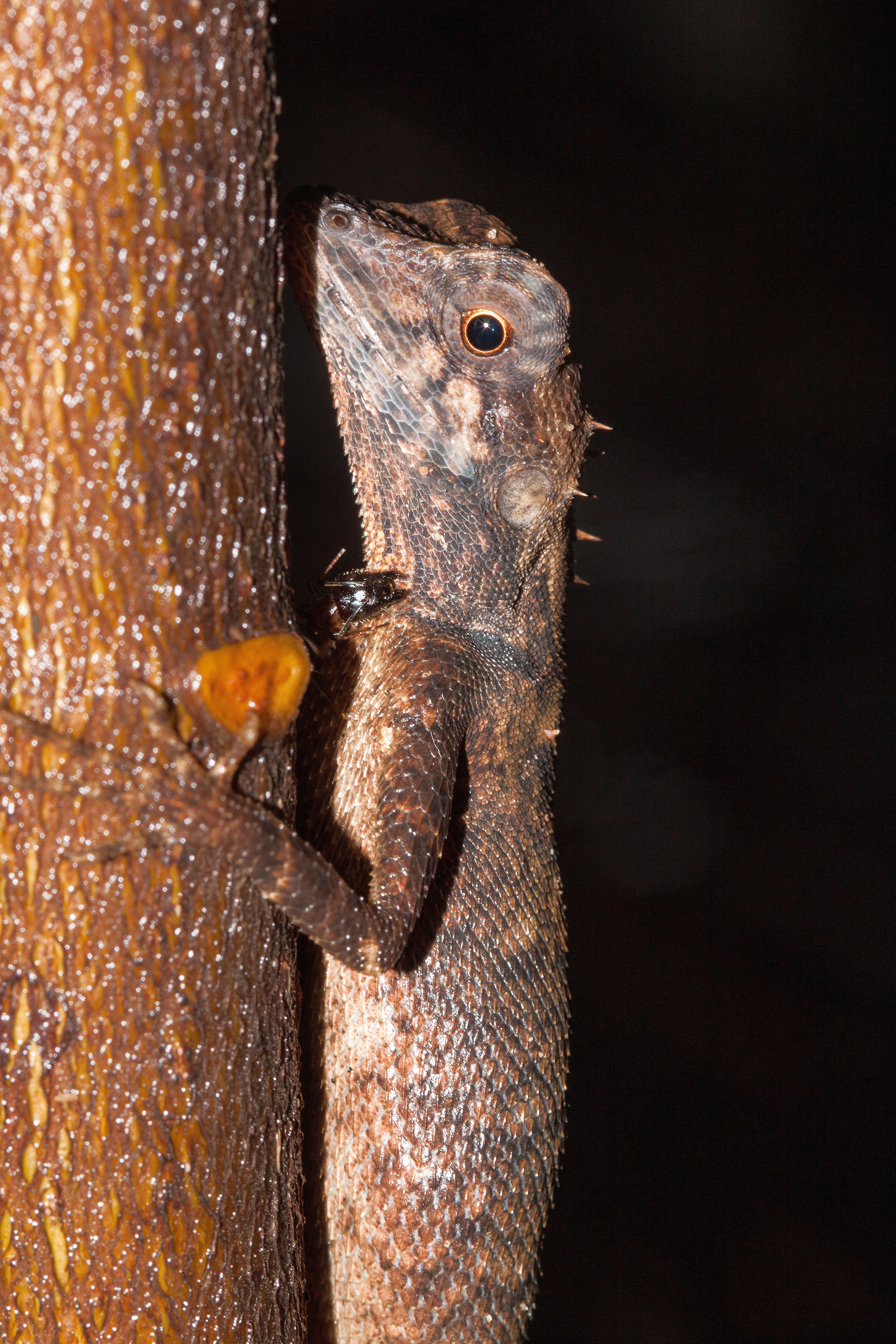
Head

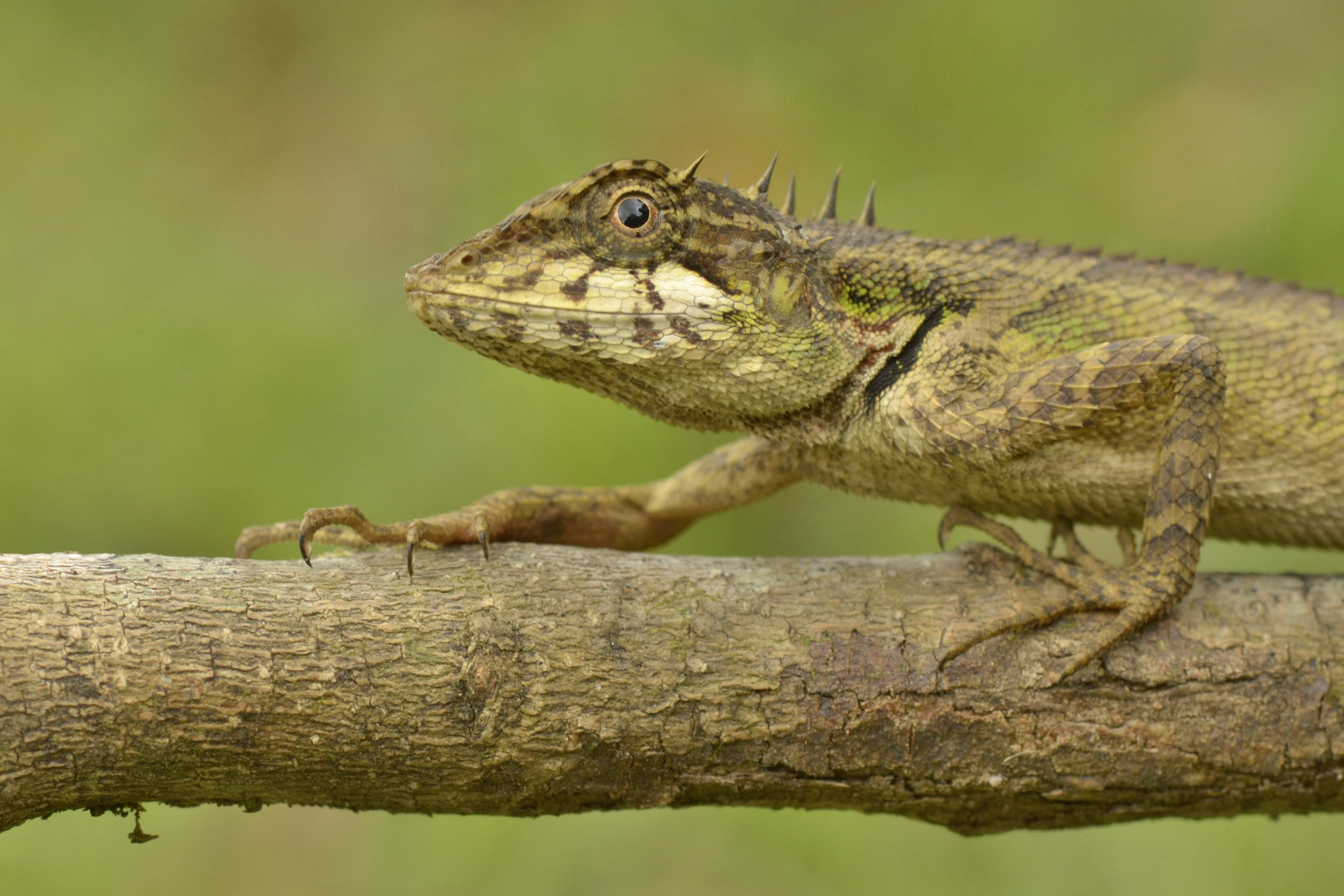
Head

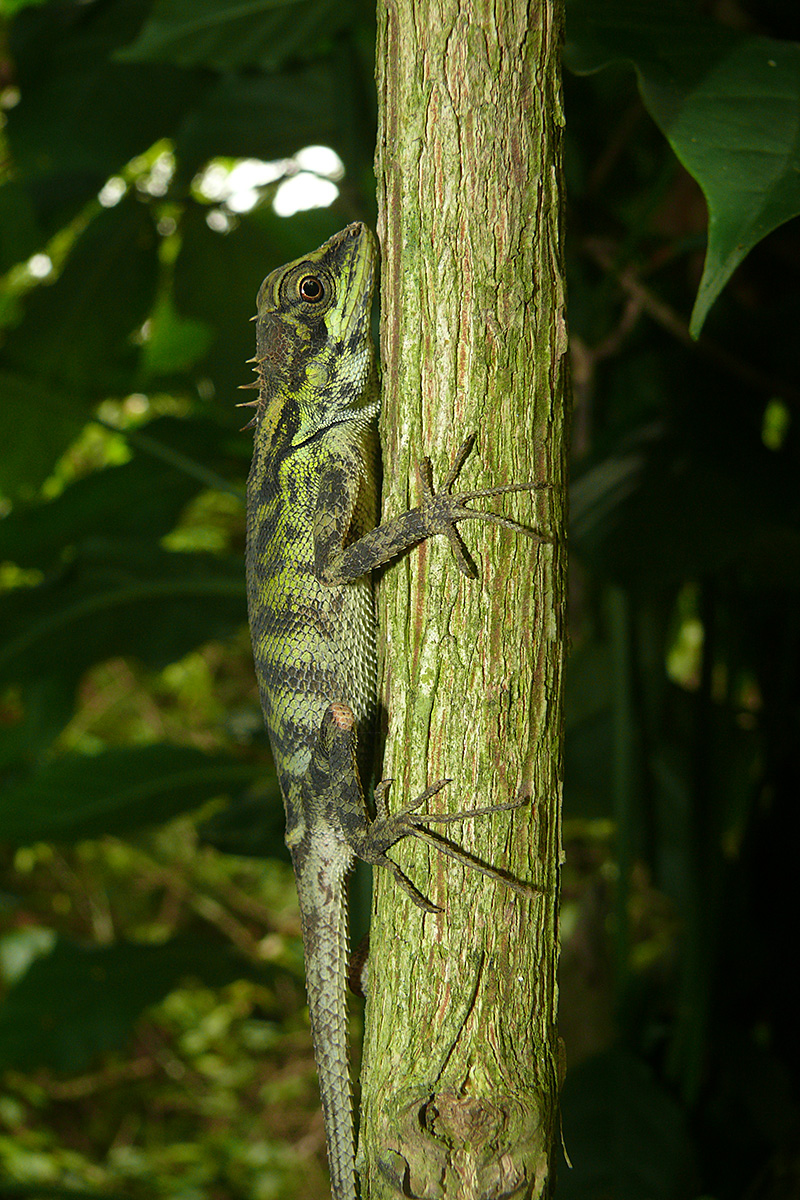
Female

Monilesaurus montanus (Montane forest lizard)

====== Monilesaurus rouxii (Roux's forest lizard) ======
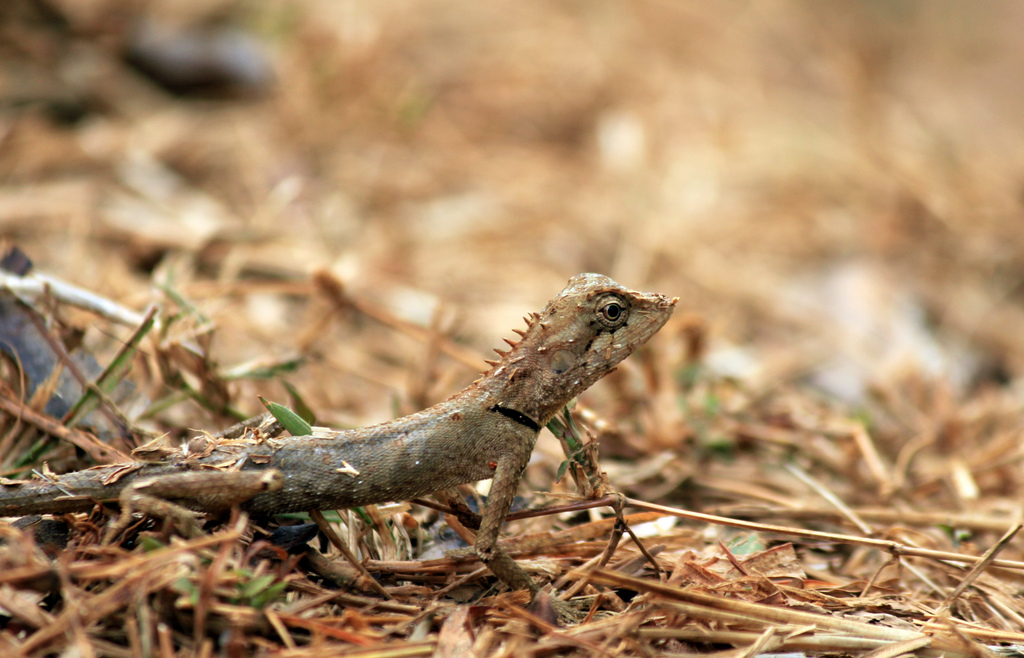
Lateral view

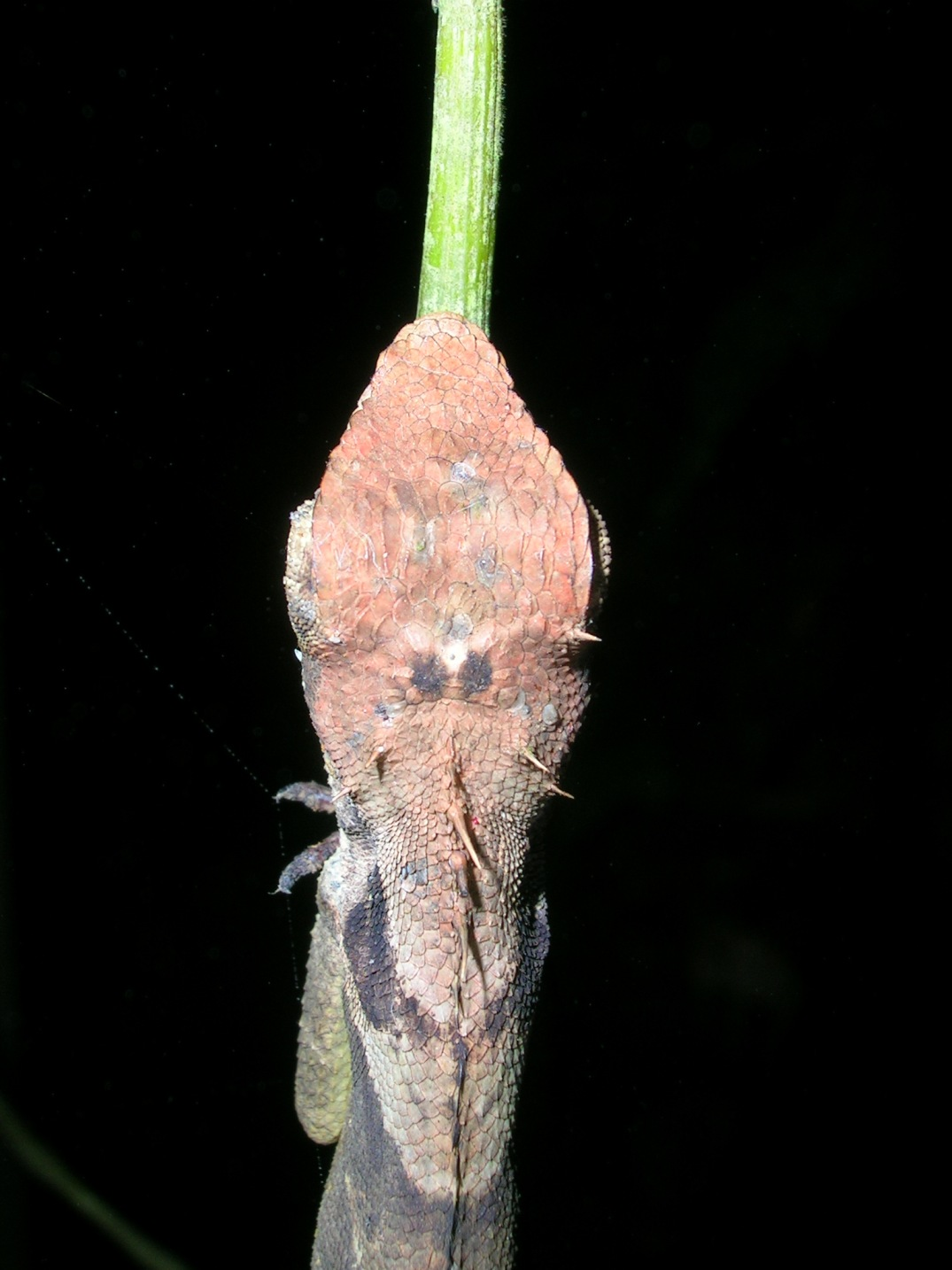
Head

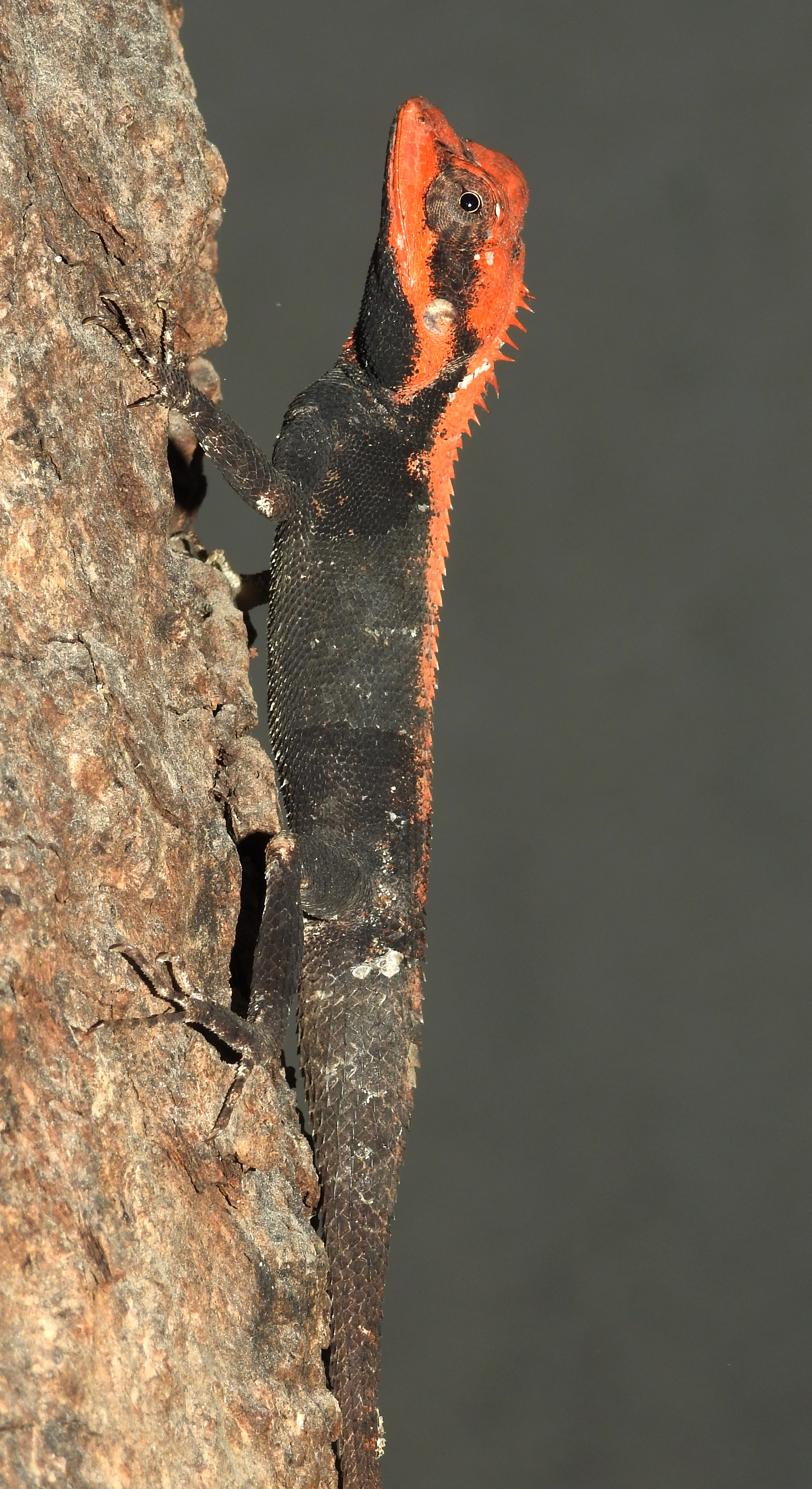
male in breeding colours

===== Genus: Draco =====
====== Draco dussumieri (southern flying lizard / പറയോന്ത്) ======
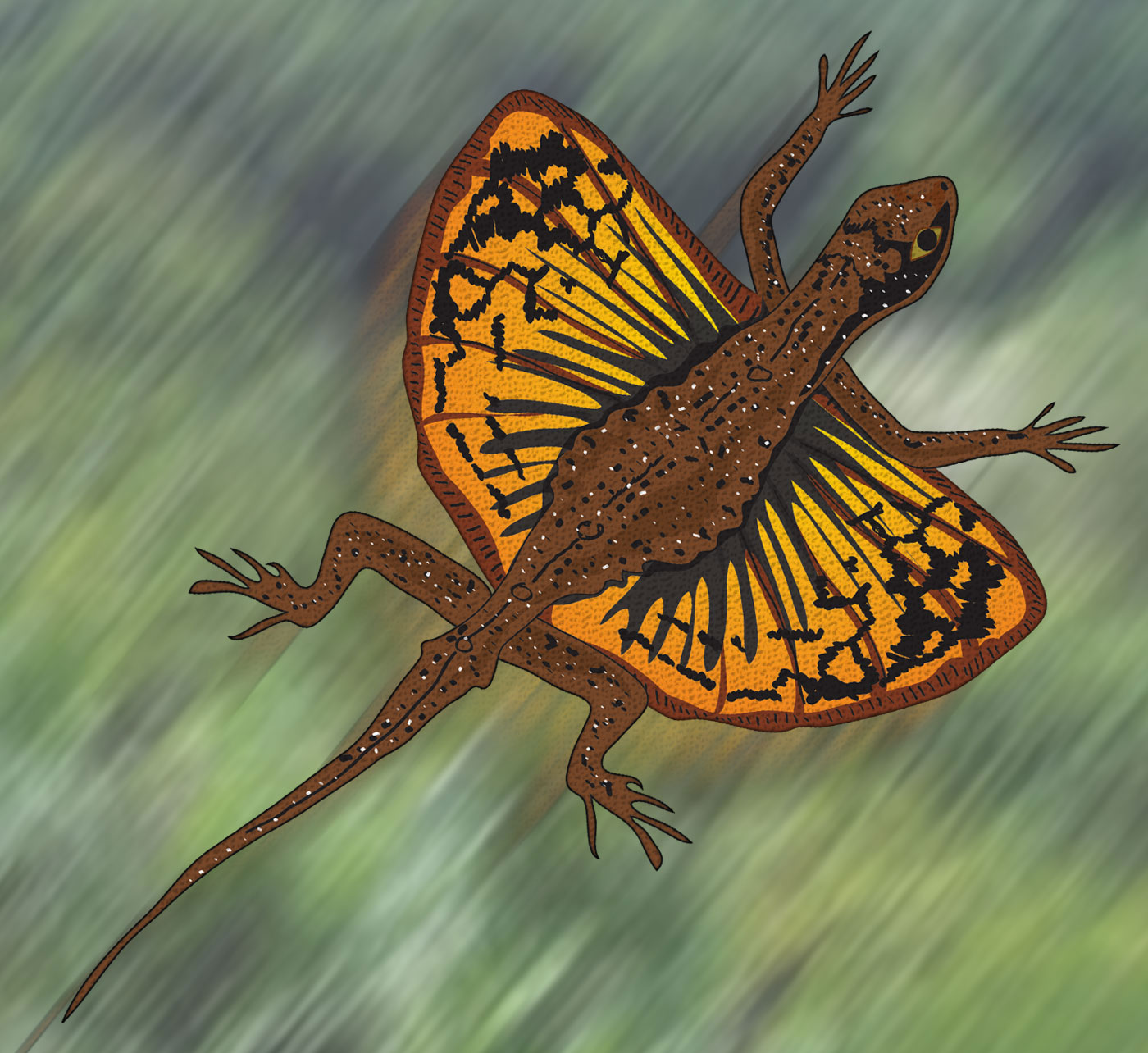
Illustration

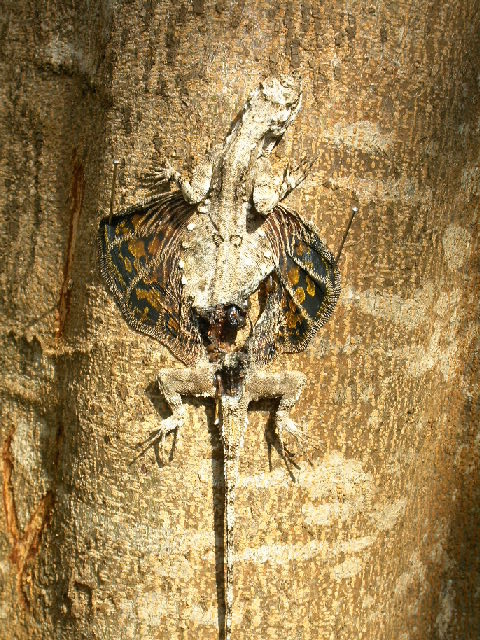
Dorsal view

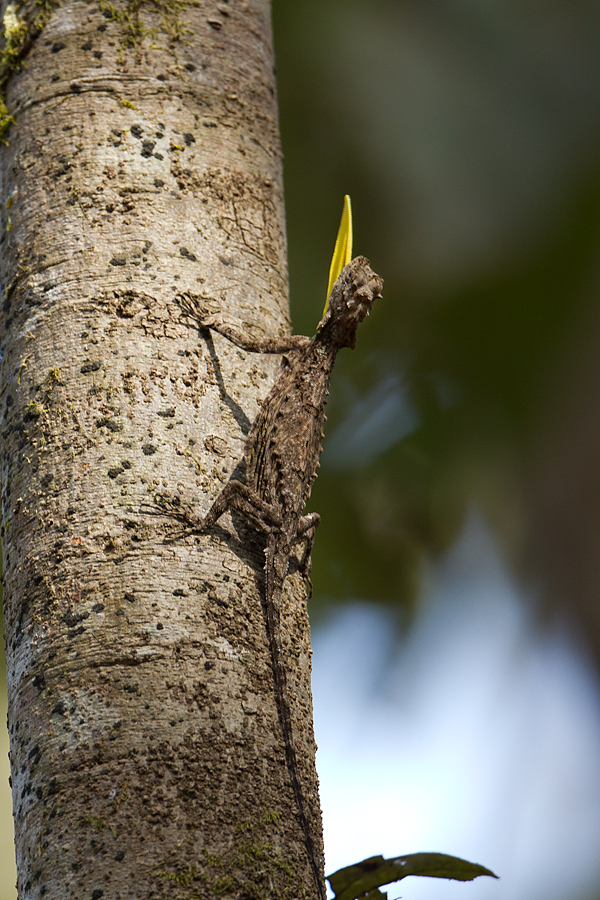
Lateral view

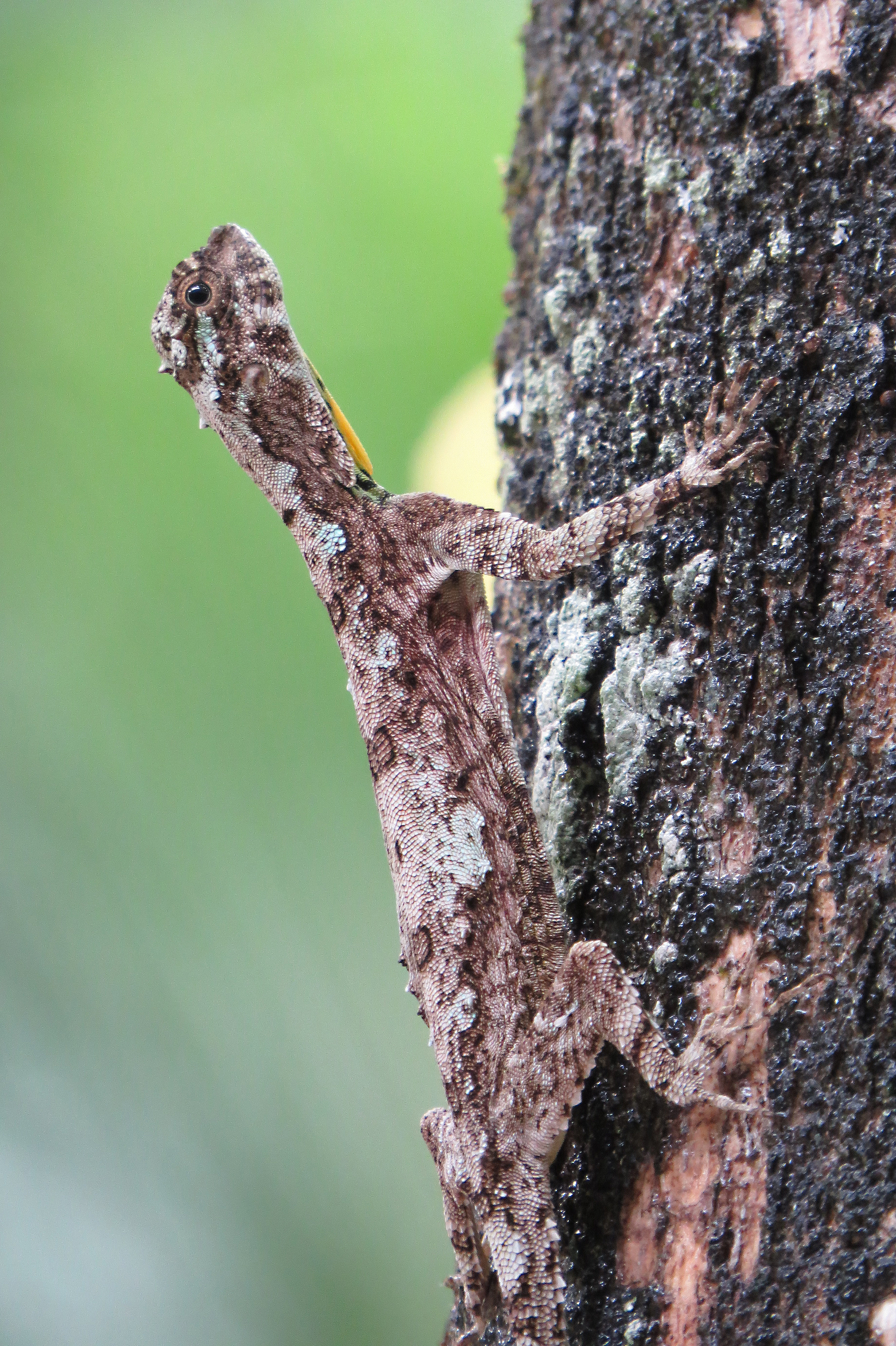
Head

===== Genus: Otocryptis =====
====== Otocryptis beddomei (Indian kangaroo lizard / കങ്കാരു ഓന്ത്) ======
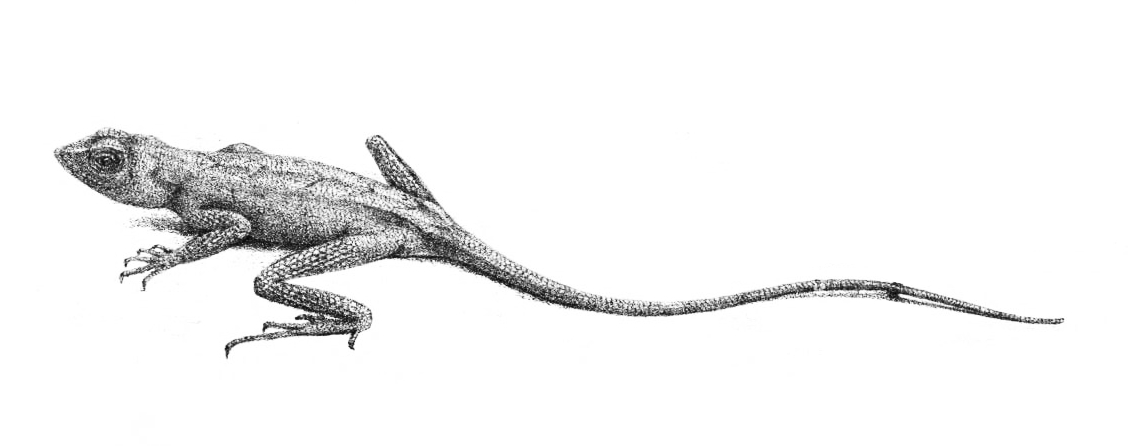
Illustration

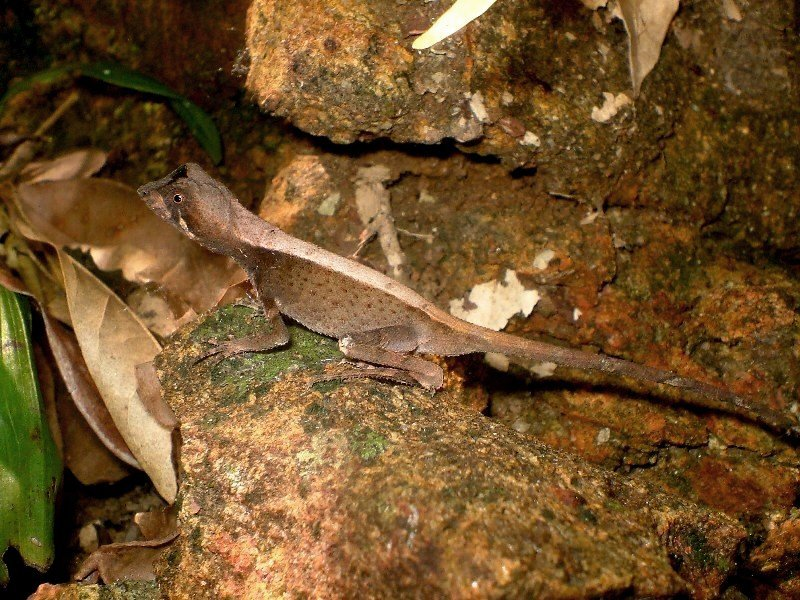
Dorsal view

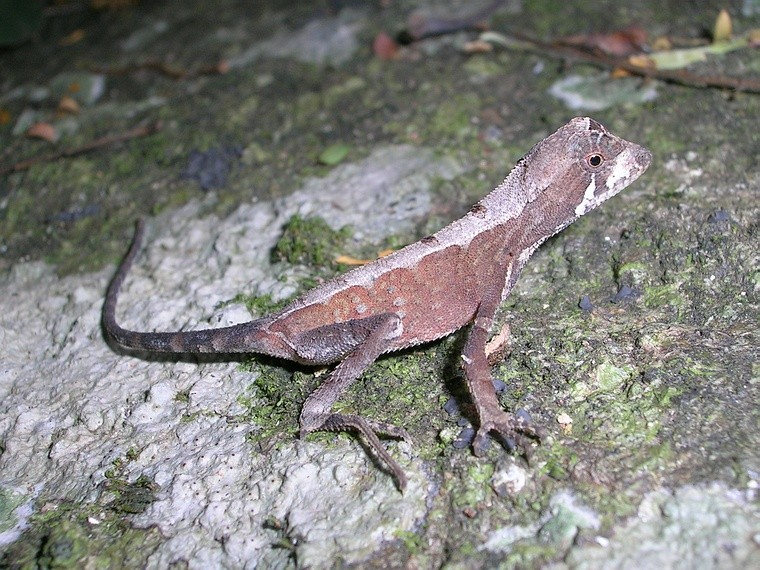
Lateral view

===== Genus: Psammophilus =====
====== Psammophilus blanfordanus (Blanford's rock agama / കൂനൻ പാറയോന്ത്) ======
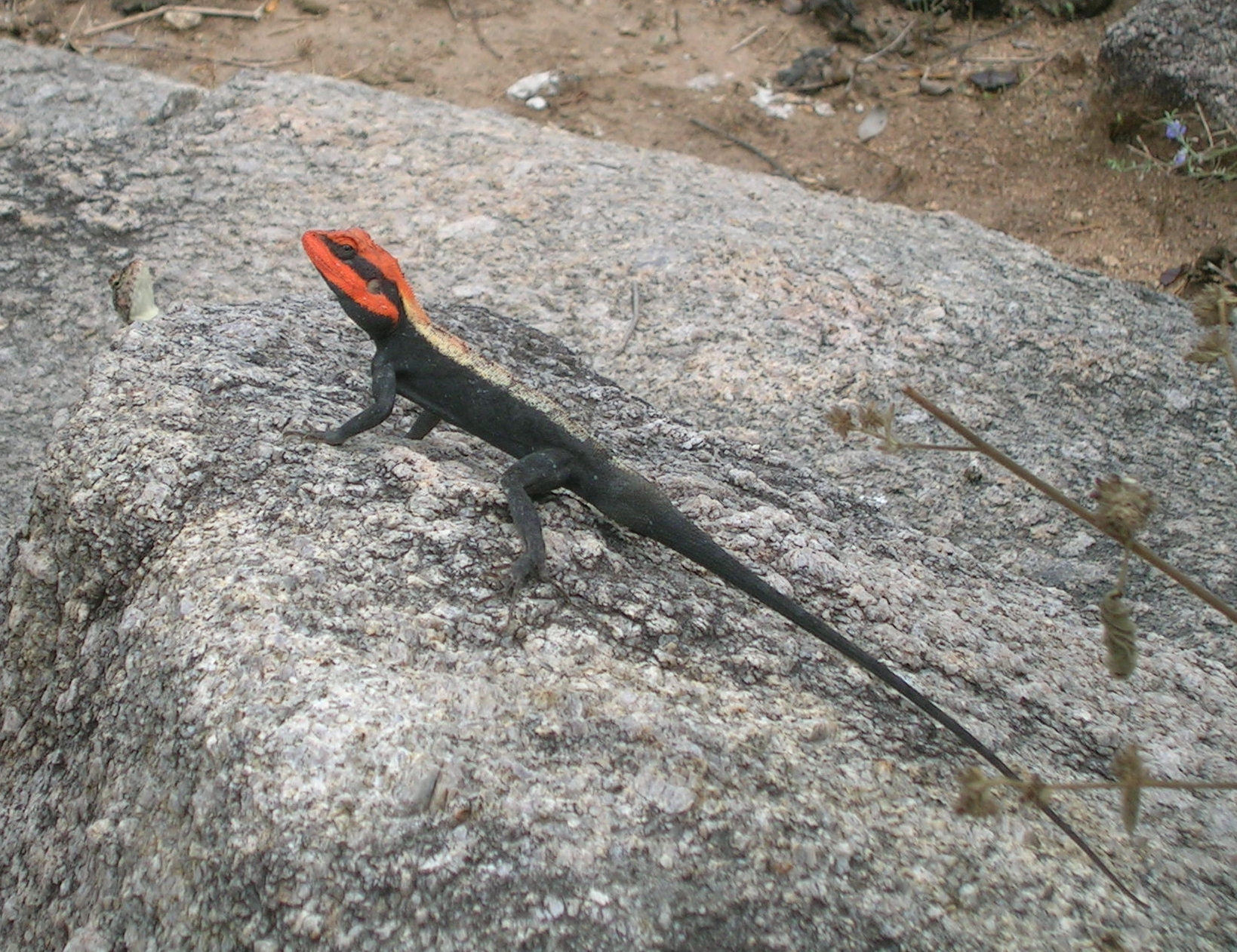
Dorsal view

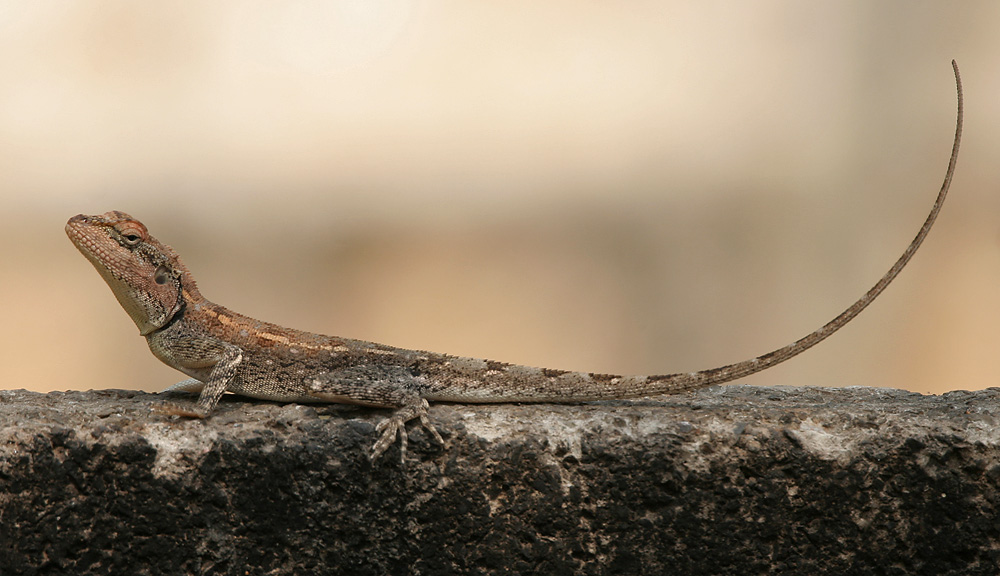
Lateral view

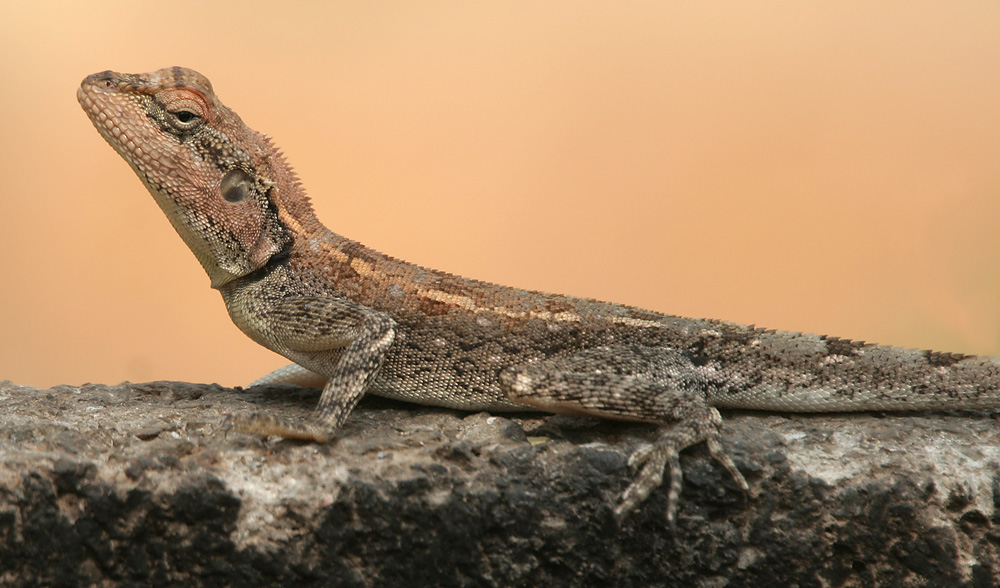
Head

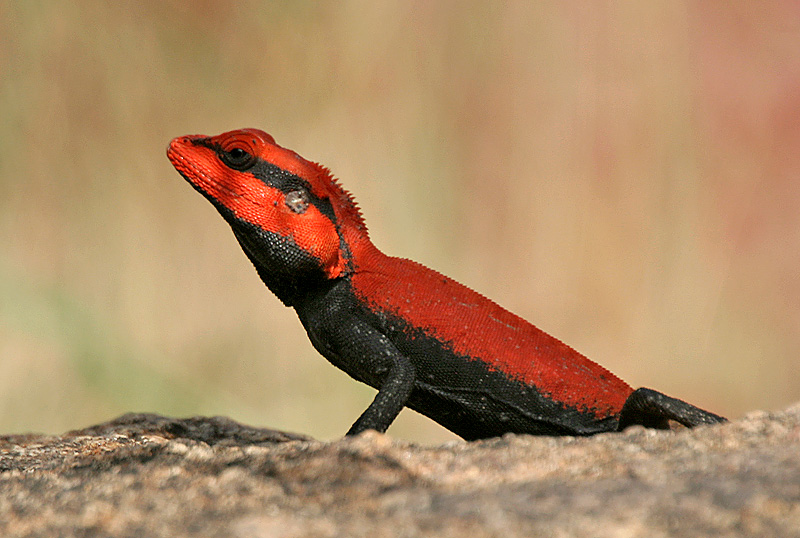
Breeding color

====== Psammophilus dorsalis (peninsular rock agama / പാറയോന്ത്) ======
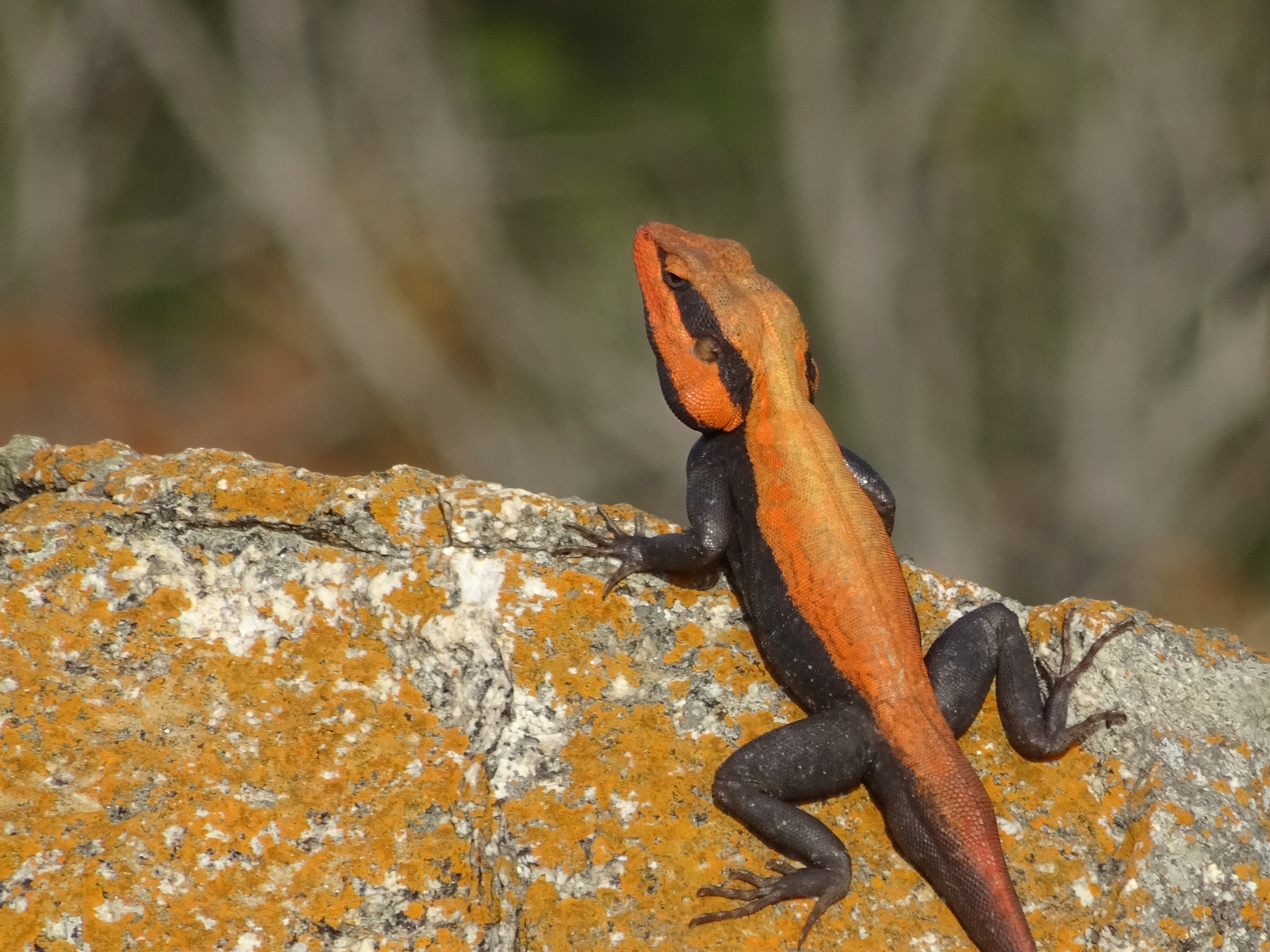
Dorsal view

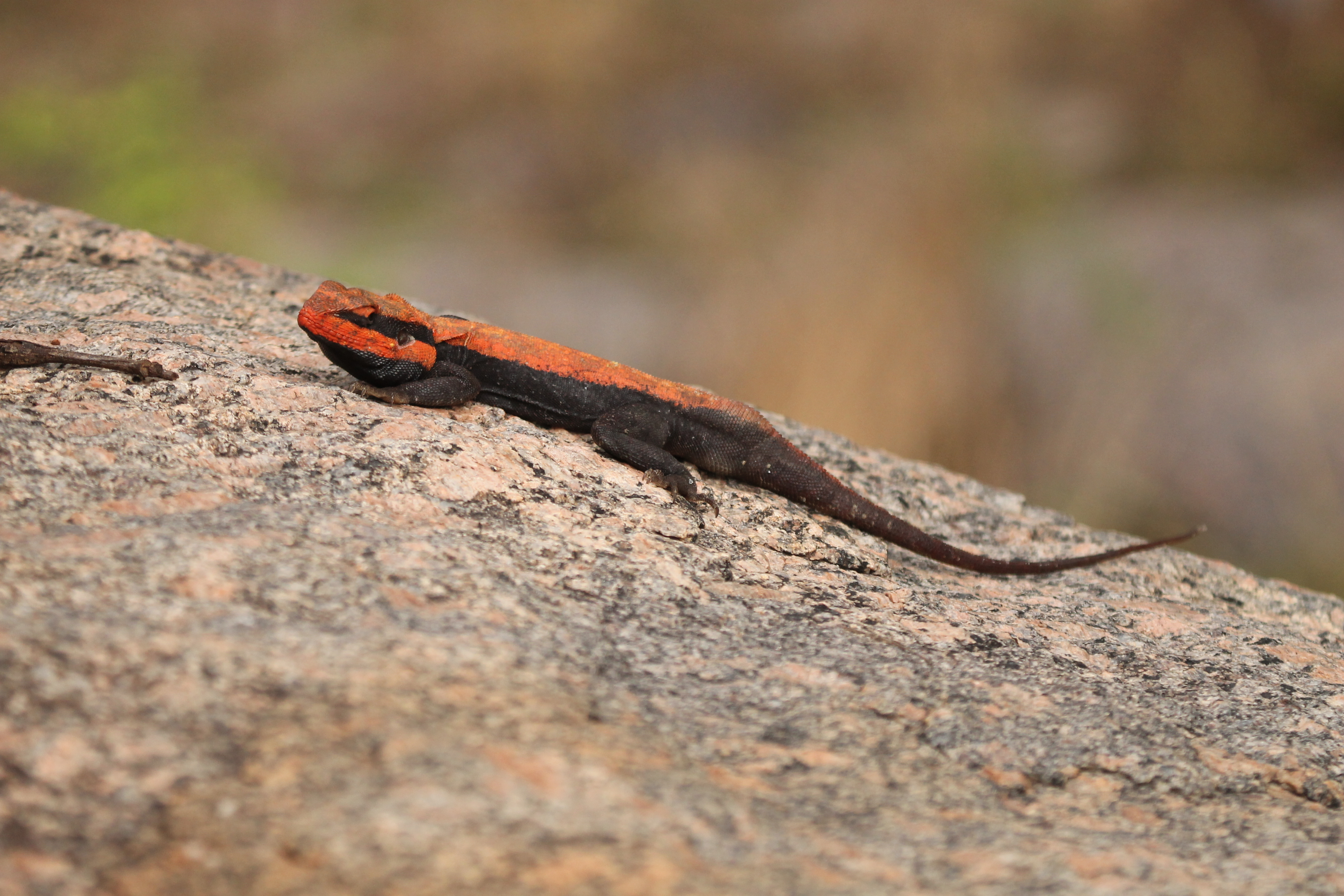
Lateral view

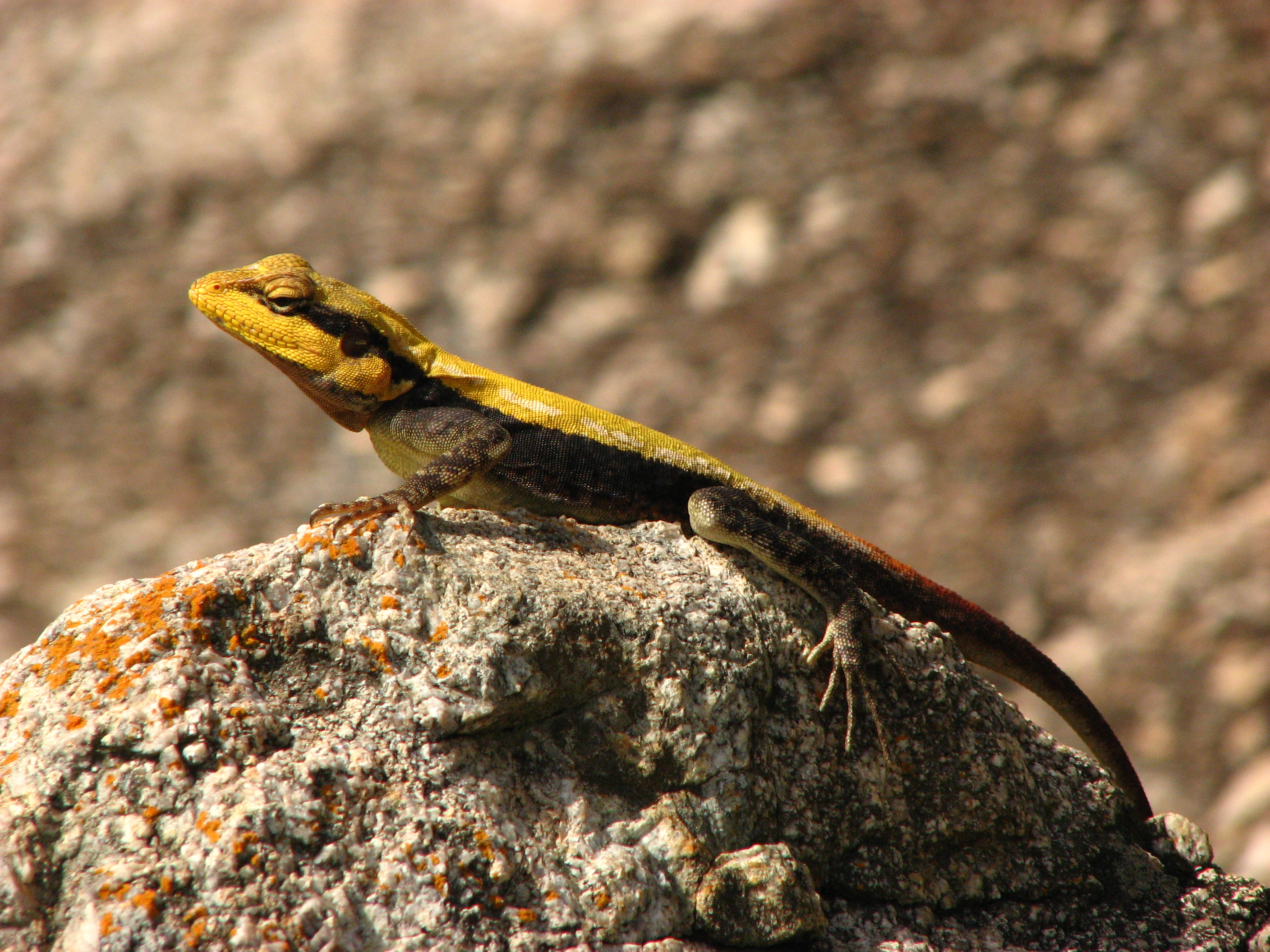
Lateral view

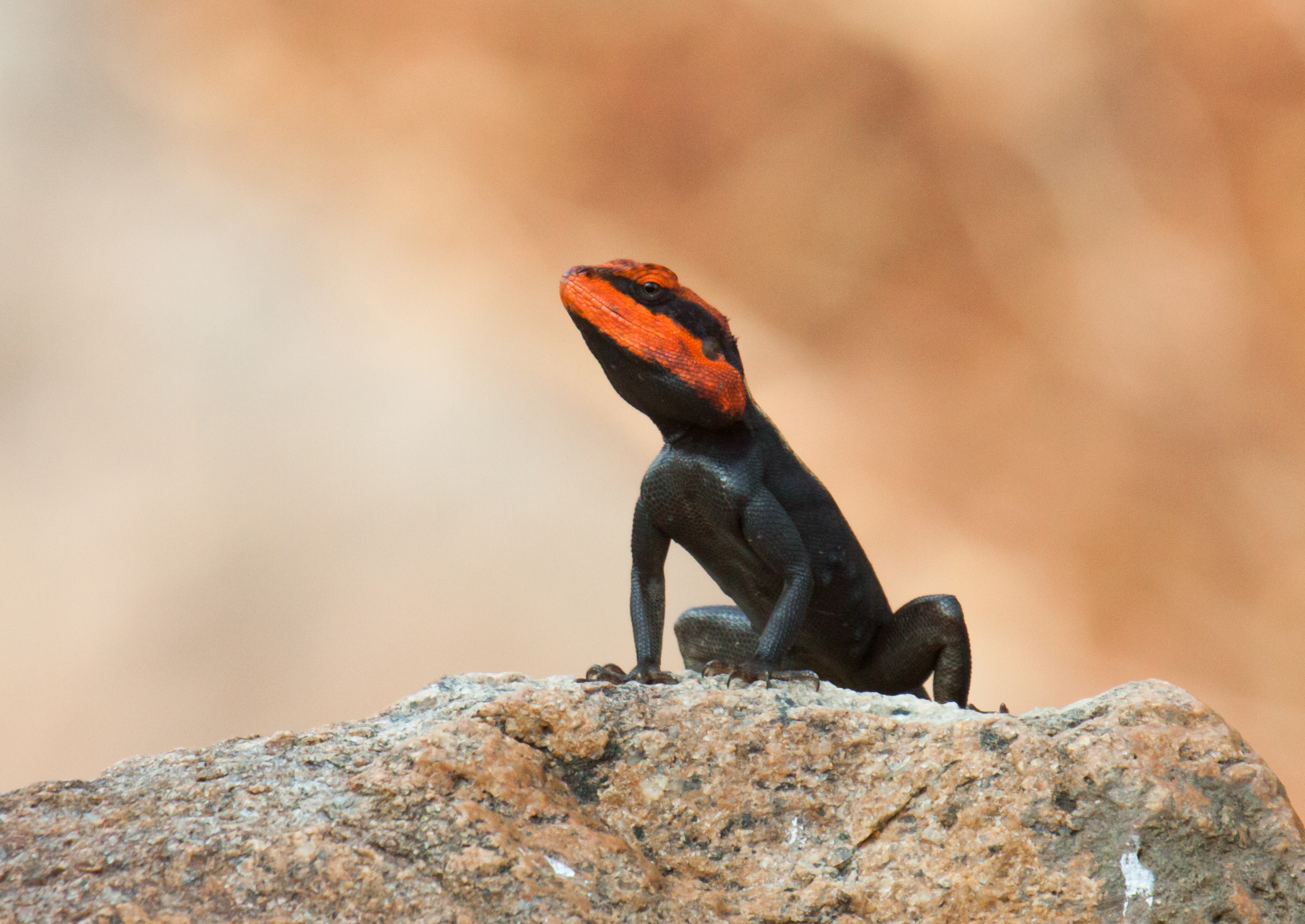
Front view

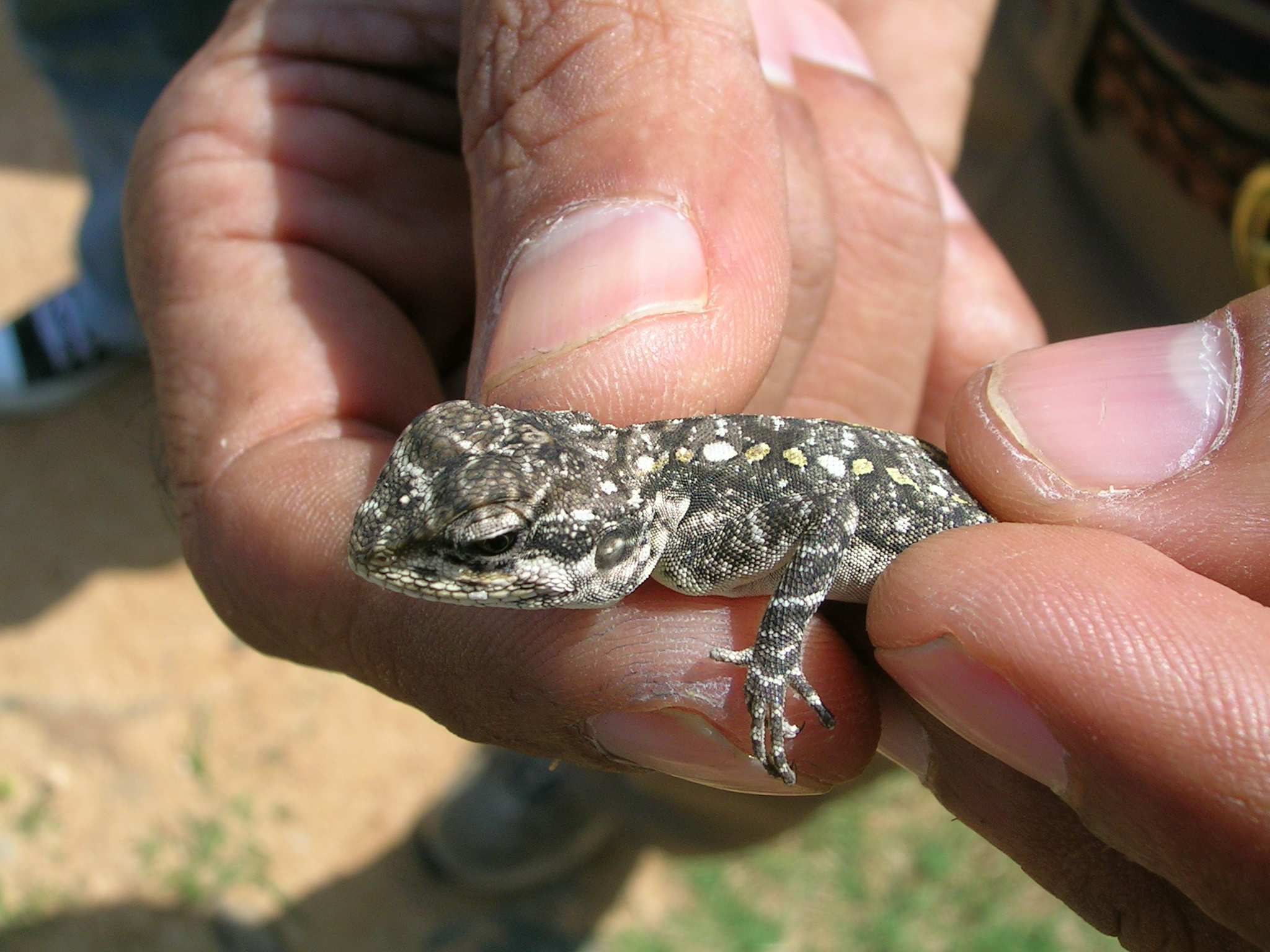
Female

===== Genus: Salea =====
====== Salea anamallayana (Anaimalai spiny lizard / ആനമലയോന്ത്) ======
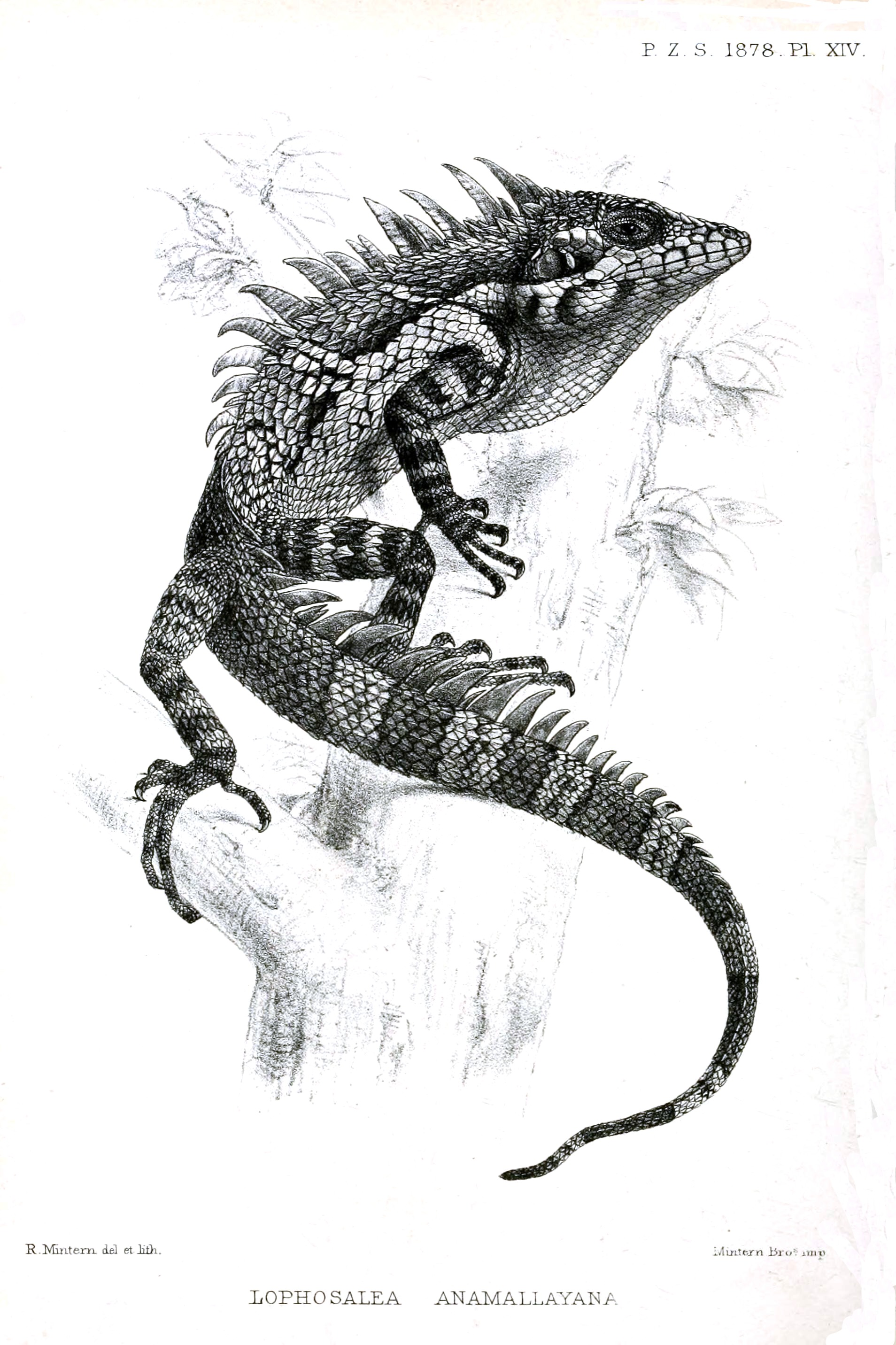
Illustration

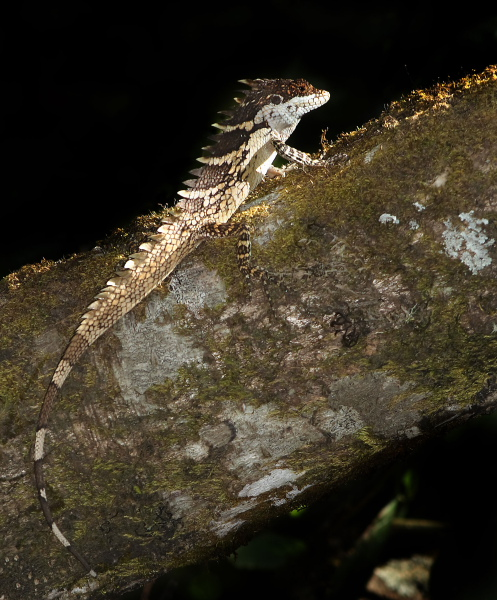
Lateral view

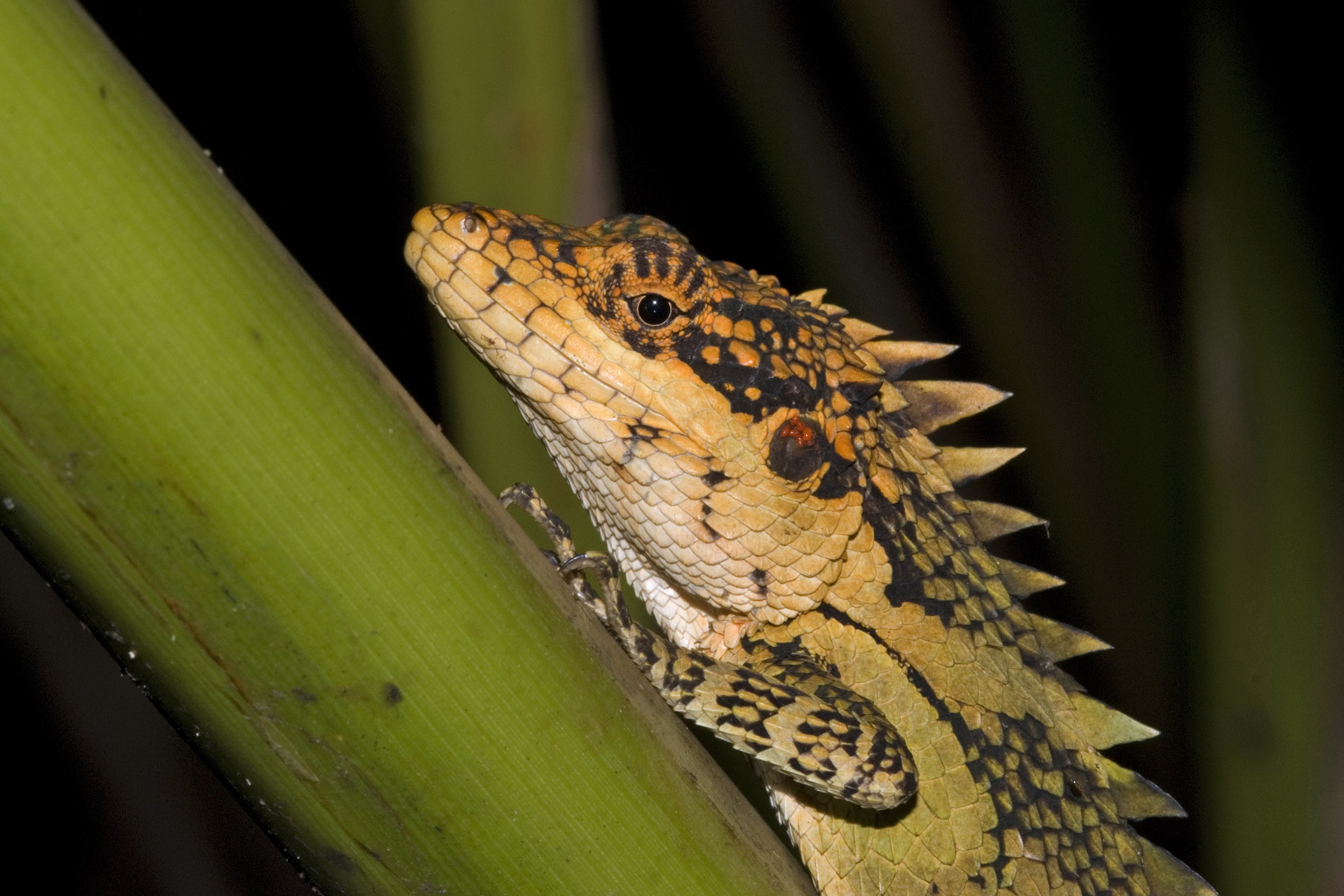
Head

====== Salea horsfieldii (Horsfield's spiny lizard / നീലഗിരി മലയോന്ത്) ======
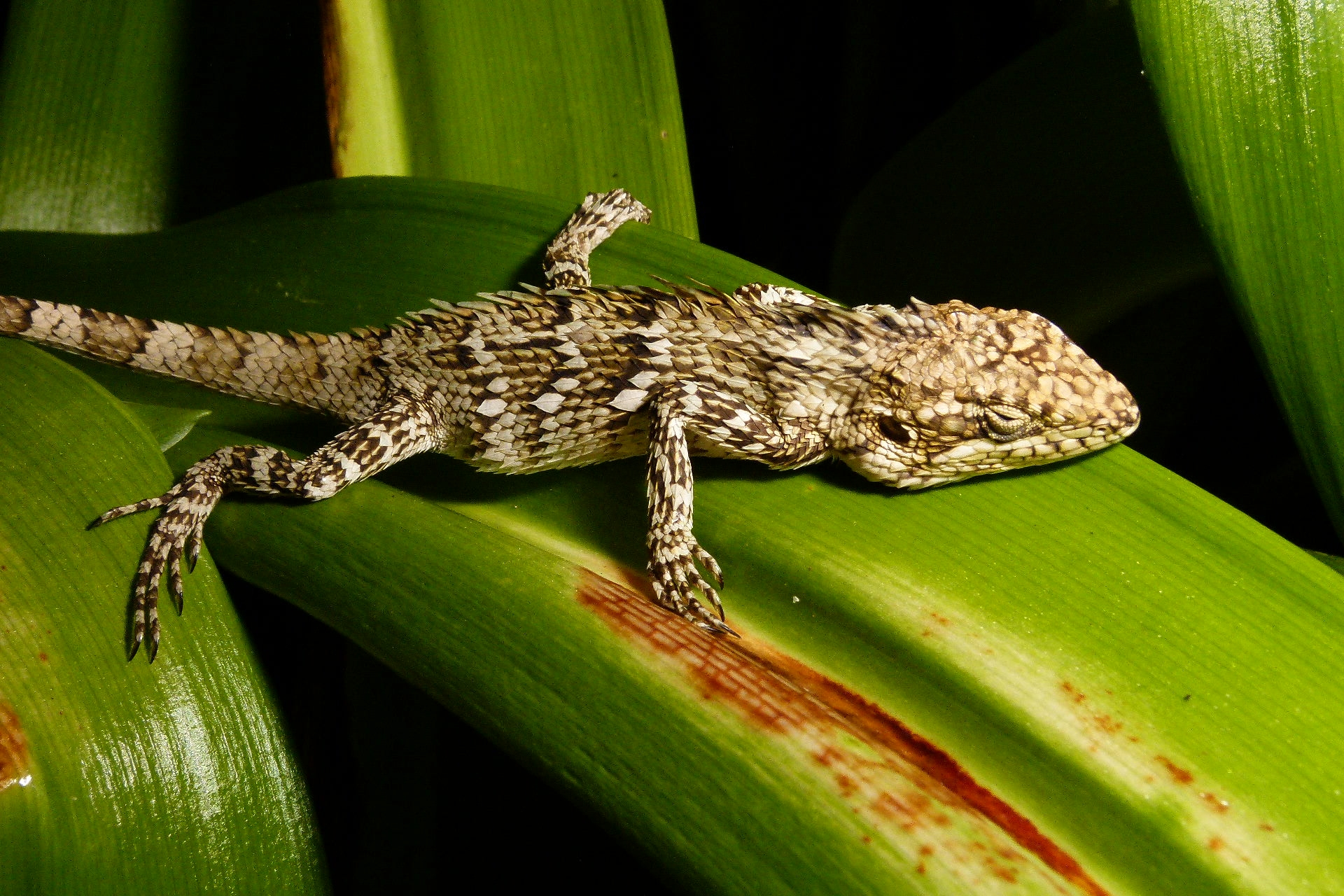
Dorsal view

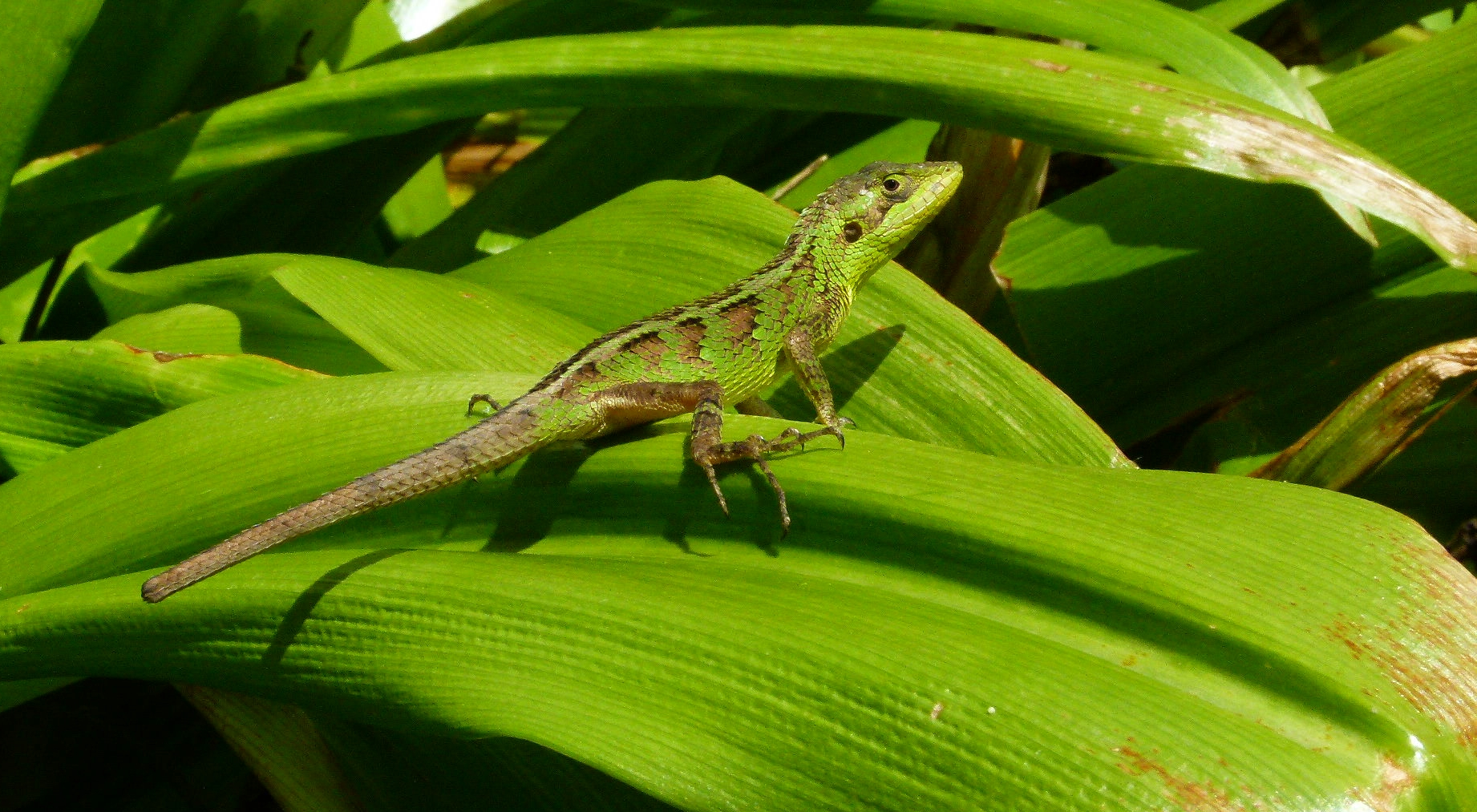
Lateral view

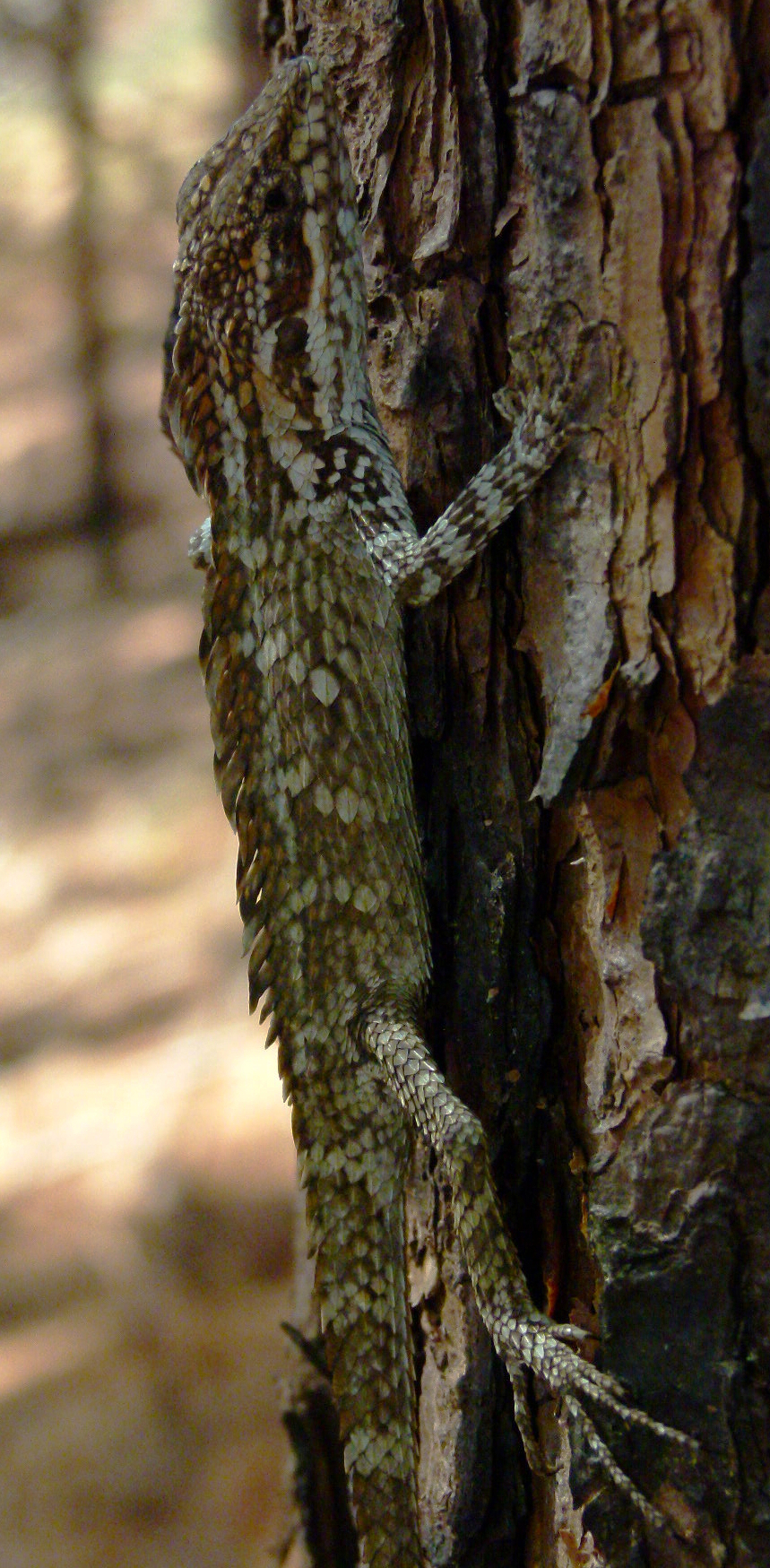
Lateral view

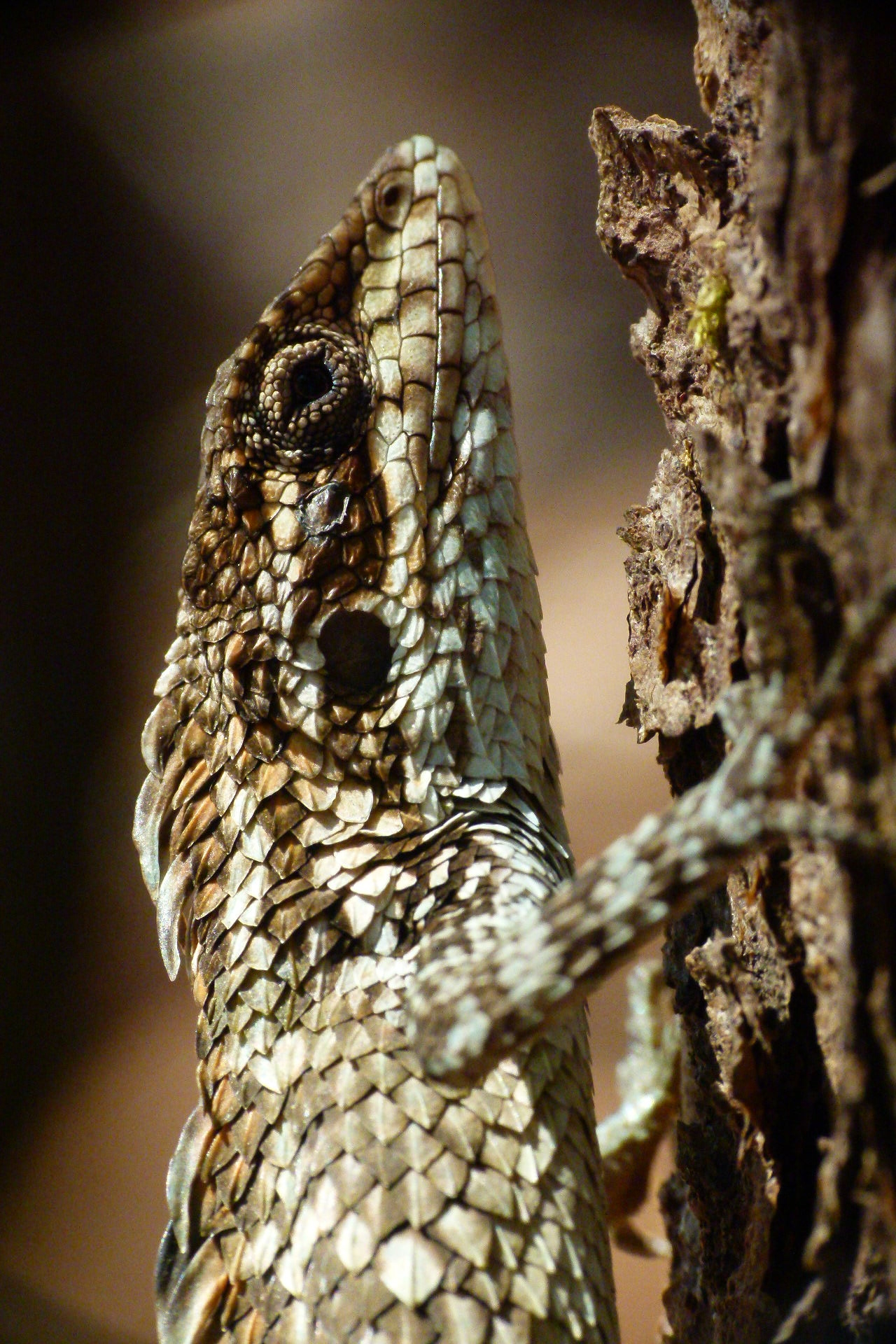
Head

===== Genus: Sitana =====
====== Sitana ponticeriana (fan-throated lizard / ചങ്കനോന്ത്) ======
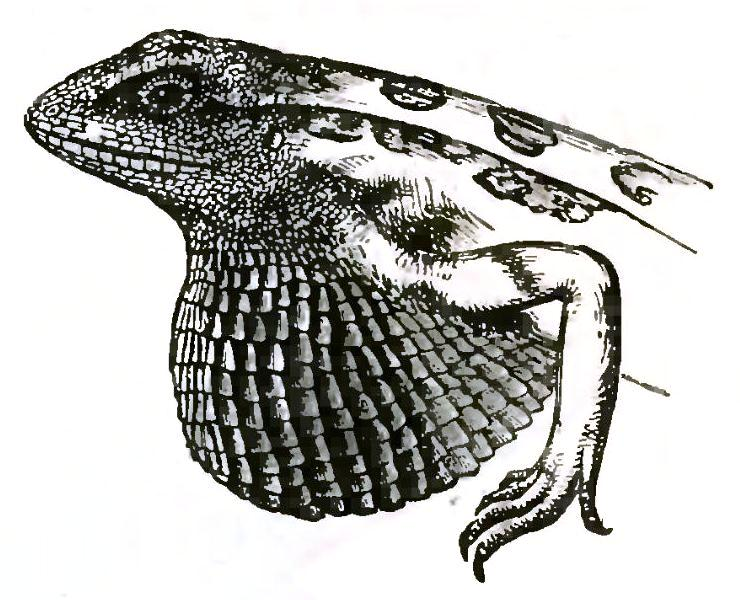
Illustration

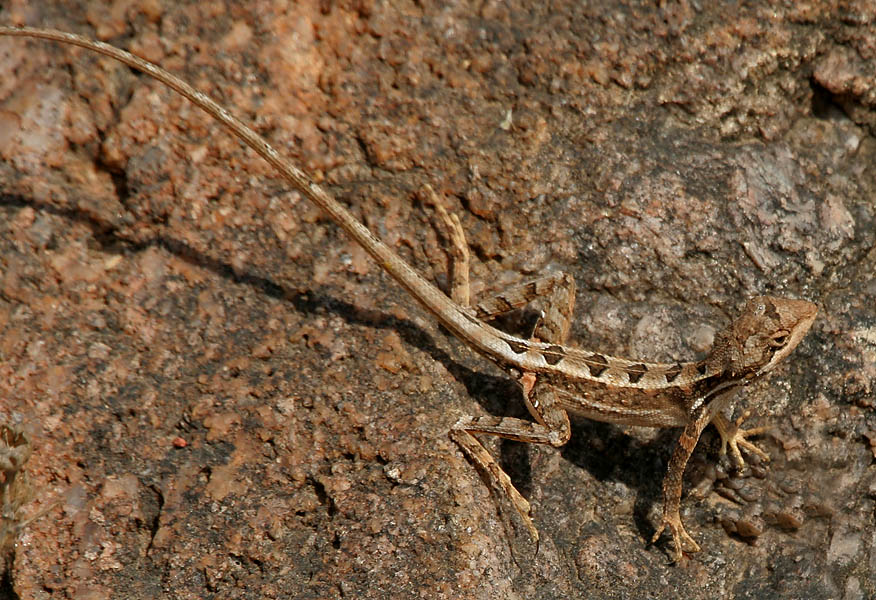
Dorsal view

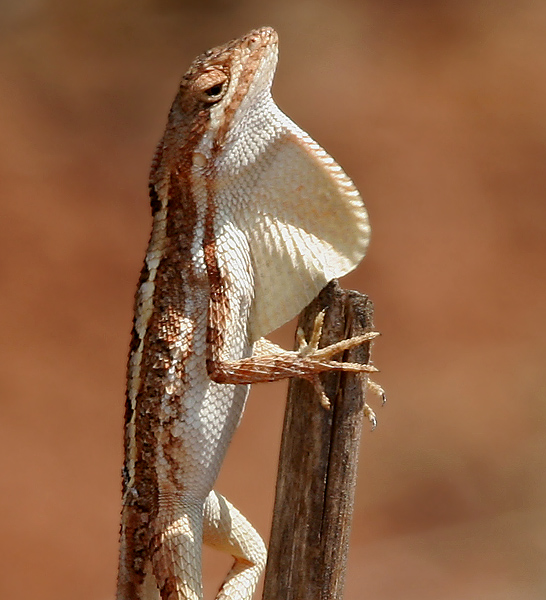
Lateral view

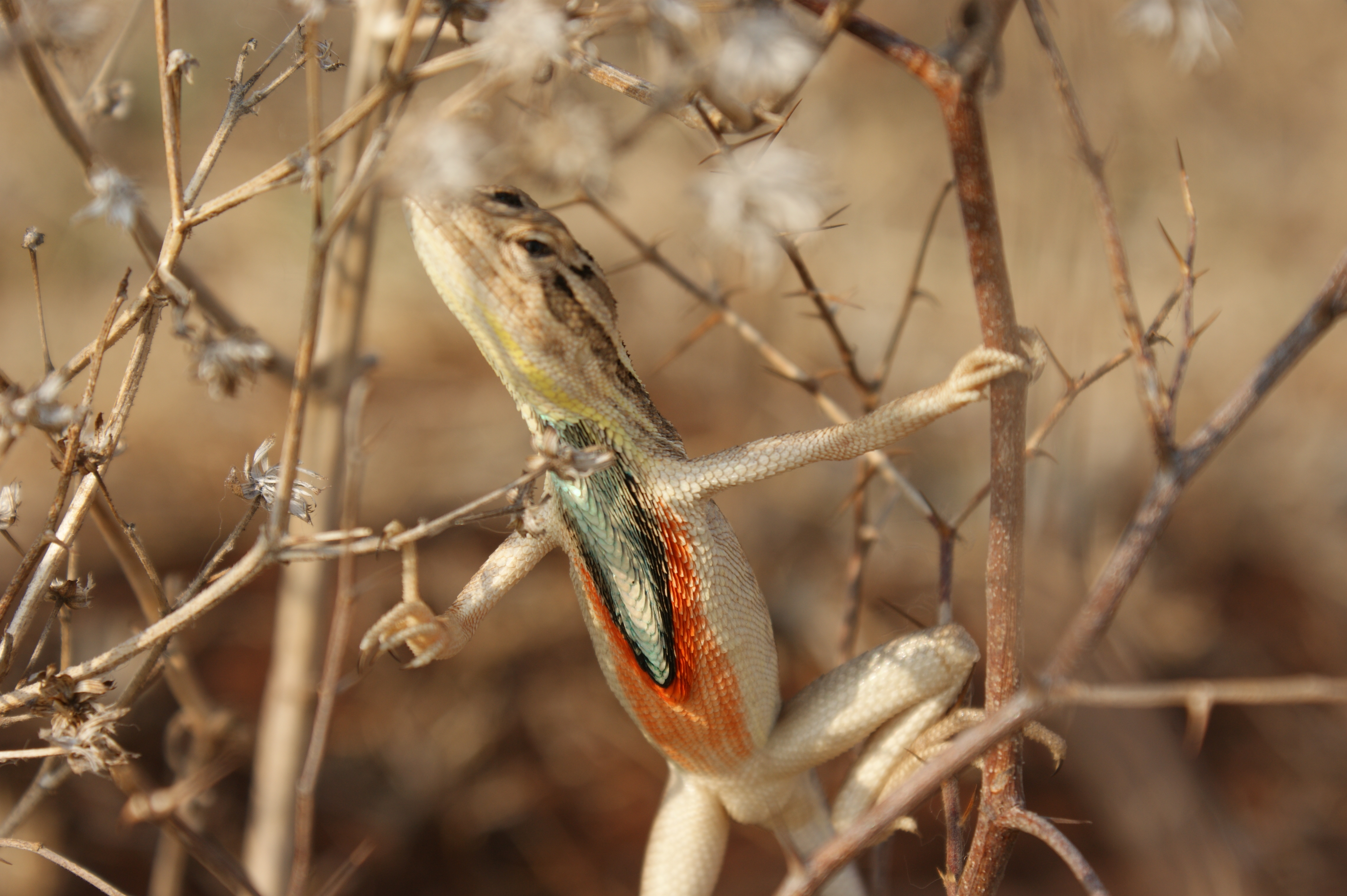
Ventral view

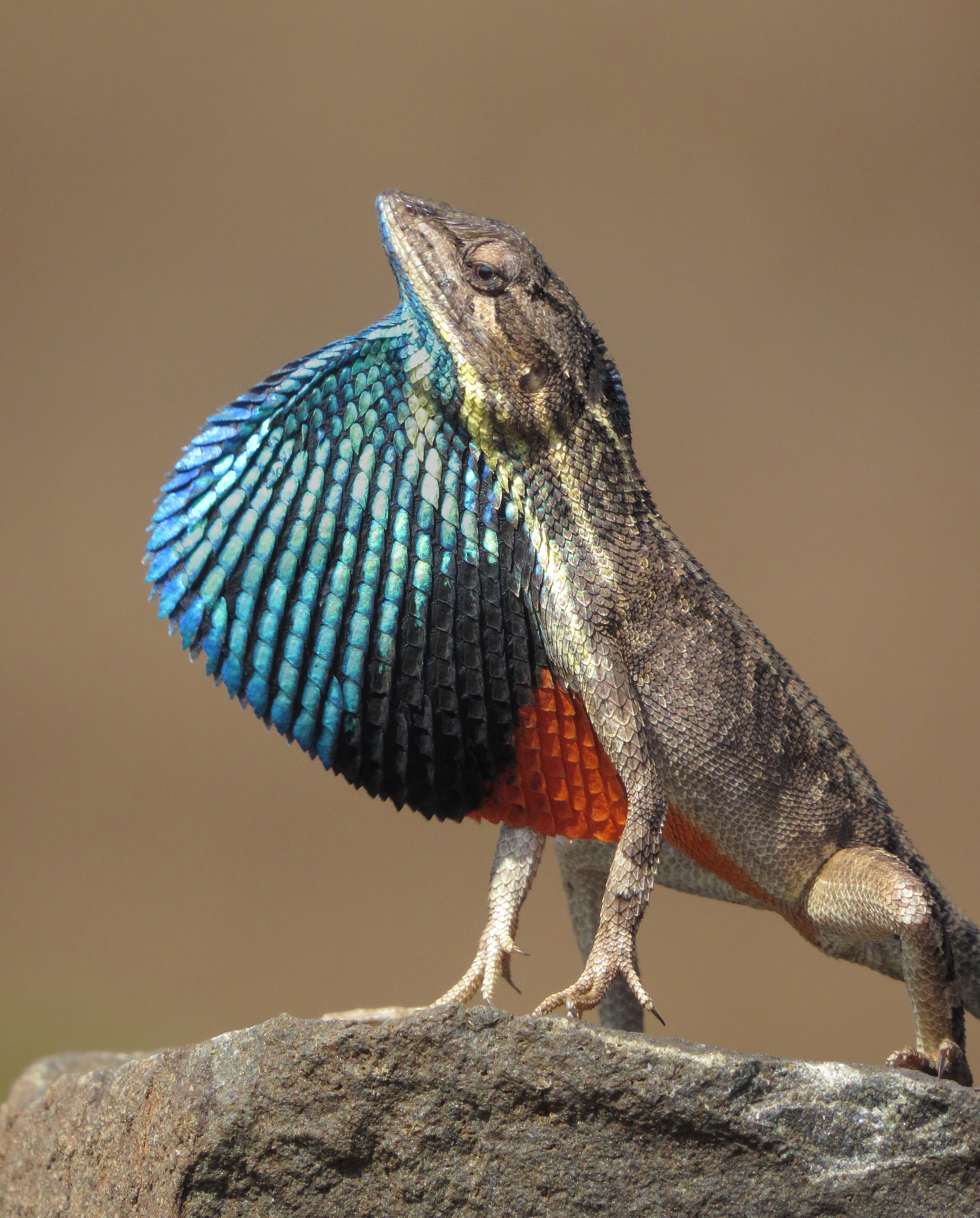
Breeding colors

==== Family: Chamaeleonidae (chameleons) ====
===== Genus: Chamaeleo =====
====== Chamaeleo zeylanicus (Indian chameleon / മരയോന്ത്) ======
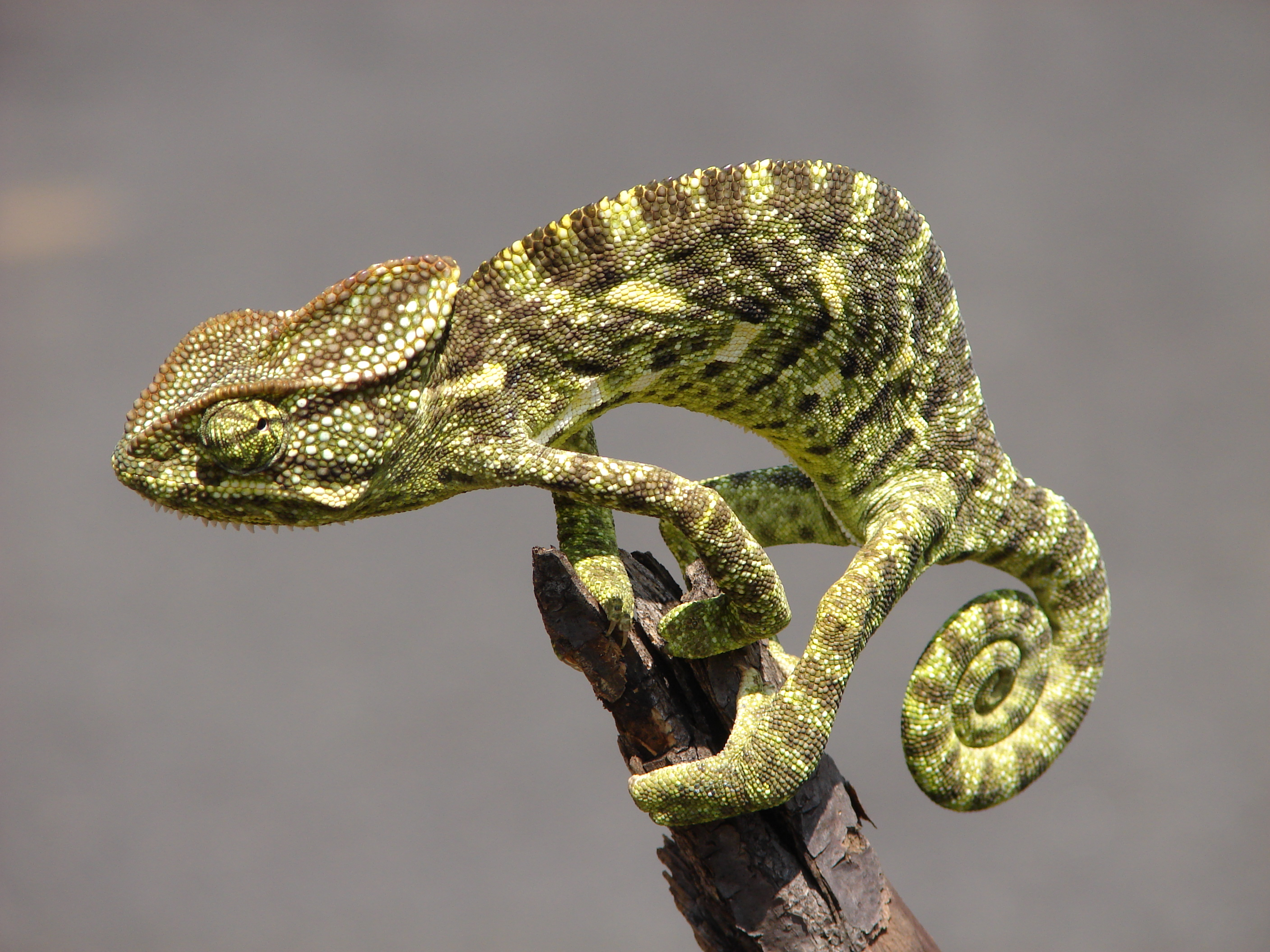
Lateral view

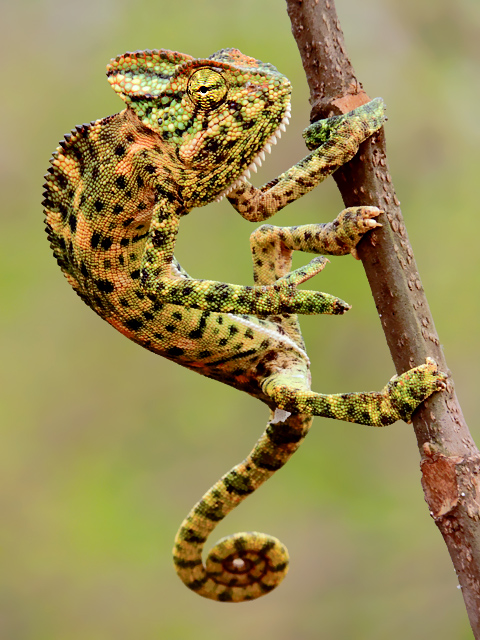
Lateral view

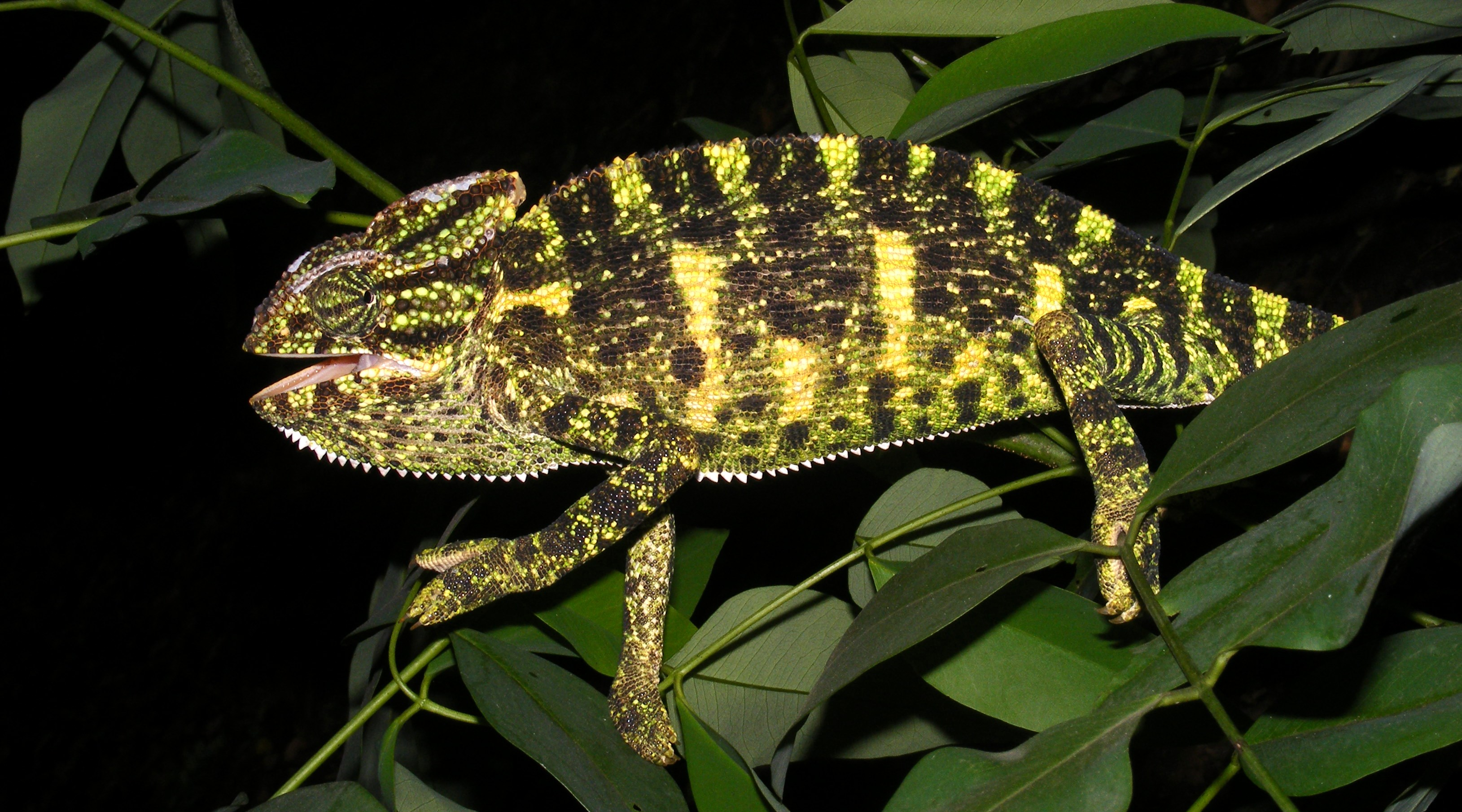
Lateral view

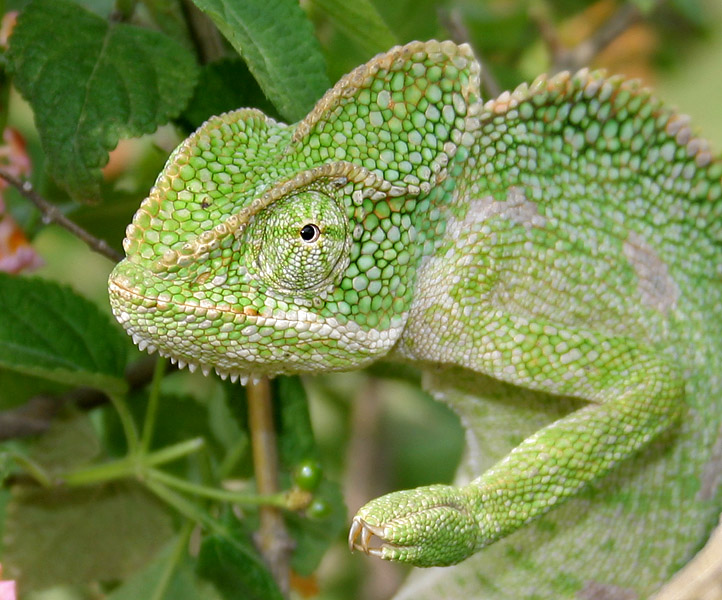
Head

==== Family: Gekkonidae (geckoes) ====
===== Genus: Cnemaspis =====
====== Cnemaspis littoralis (coastal day gecko) ======
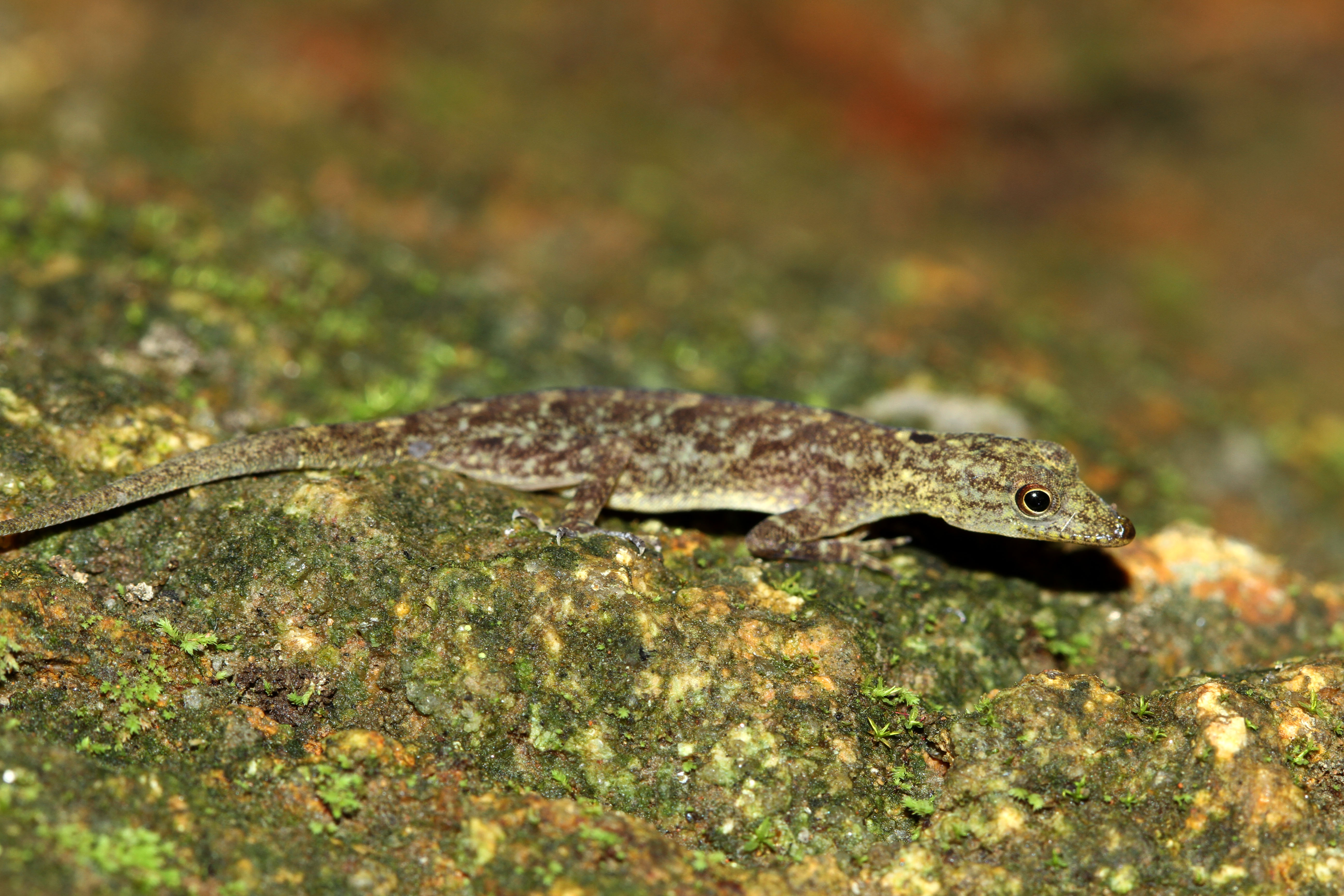
Lateral view

===== Genus: Geckoella =====
====== Geckoella collegalensis (Kollegal ground gecko) ======
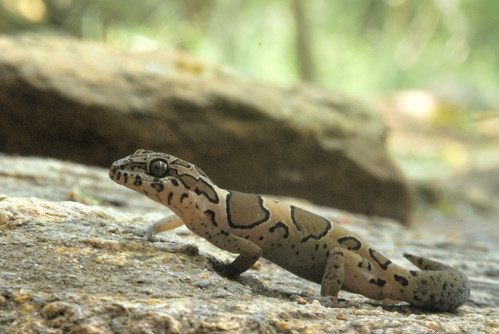
Lateral view

===== Genus: Gehyra =====
====== Gehyra mutilata (four-clawed gecko) ======
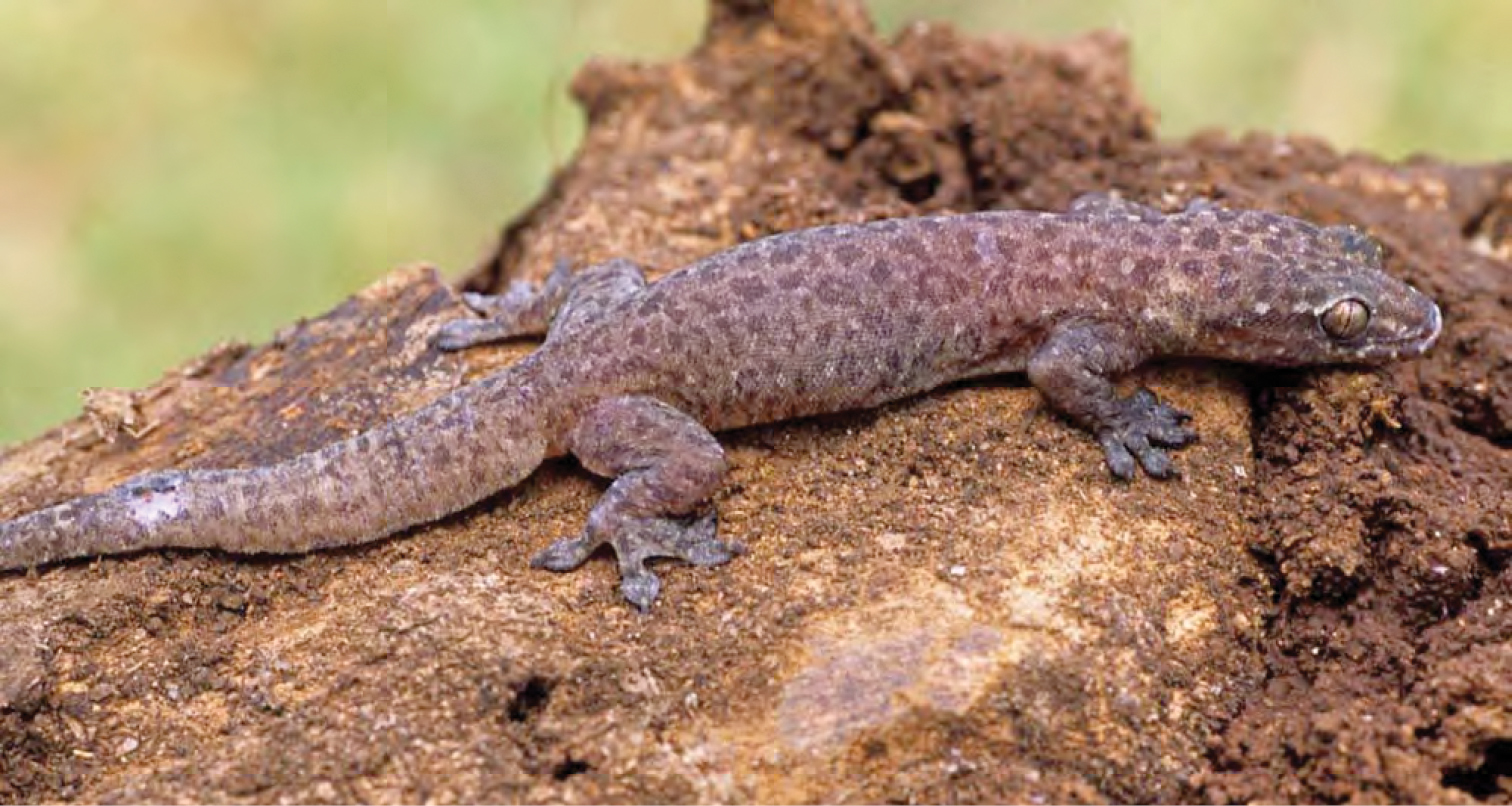
Lateral view

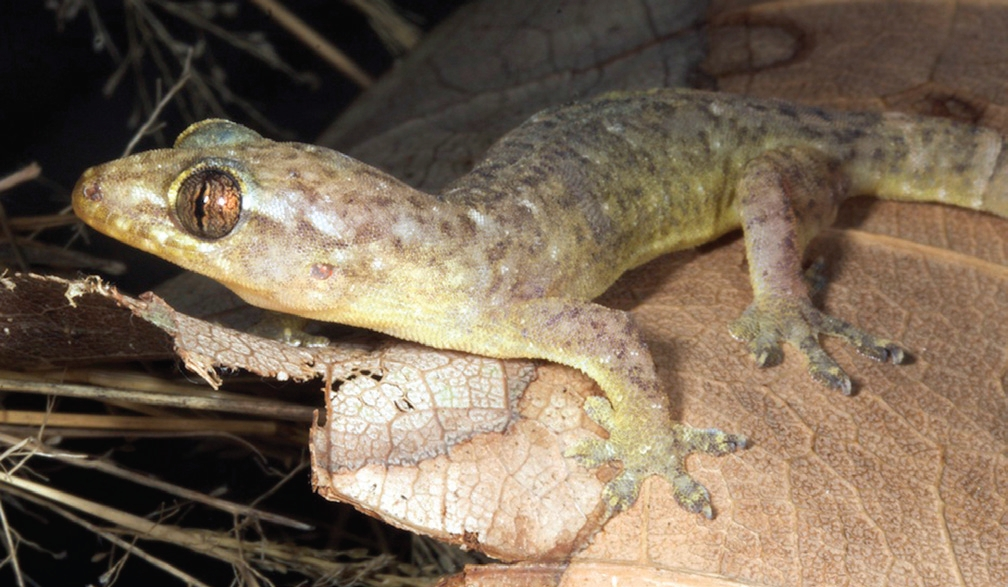
Head

===== Genus: Hemidactylus =====
====== Hemidactylus brookii (Brooke's house gecko) ======
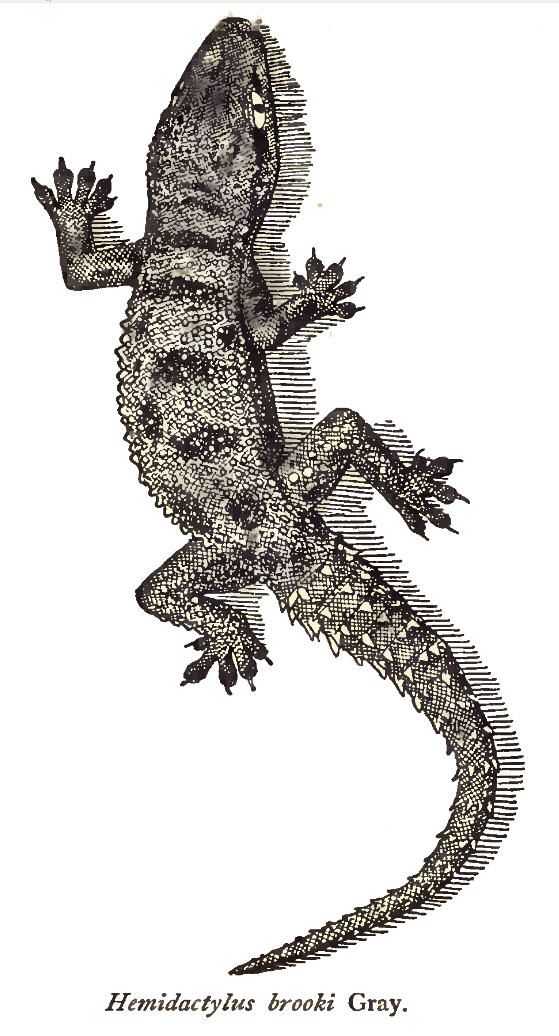
Illustration

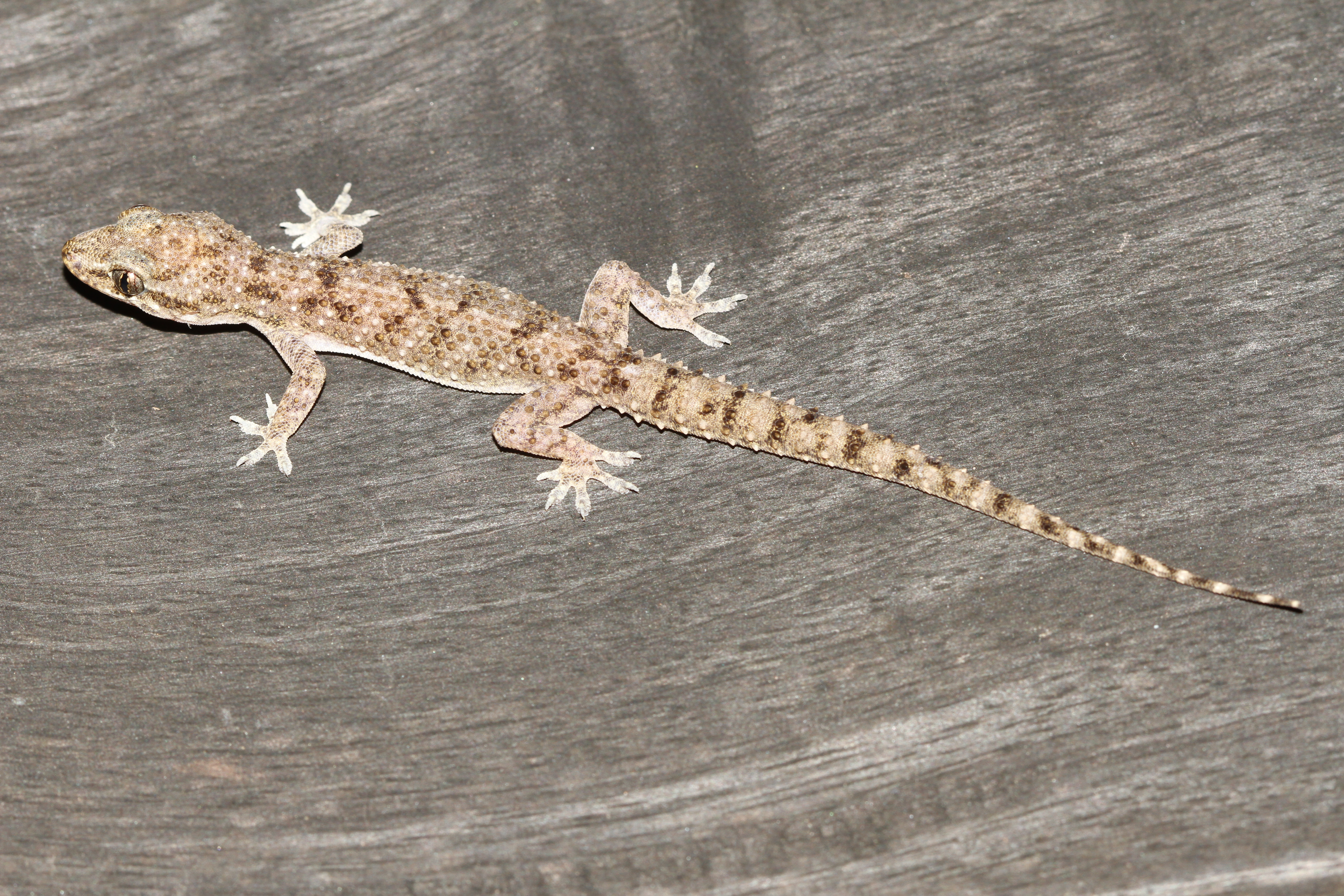
Lateral view

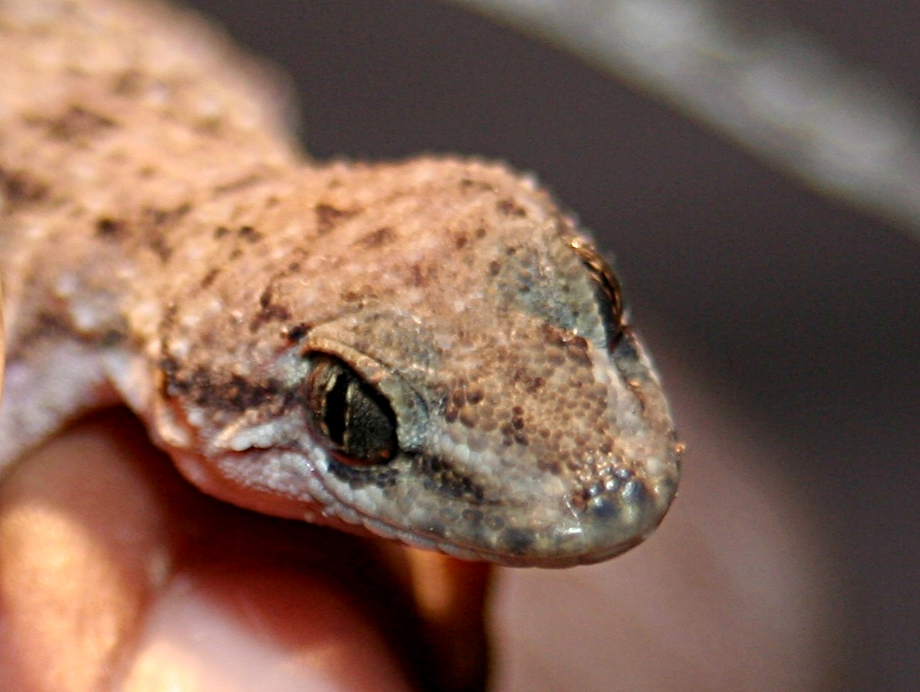
Head

====== Hemidactylus frenatus (common house gecko) ======
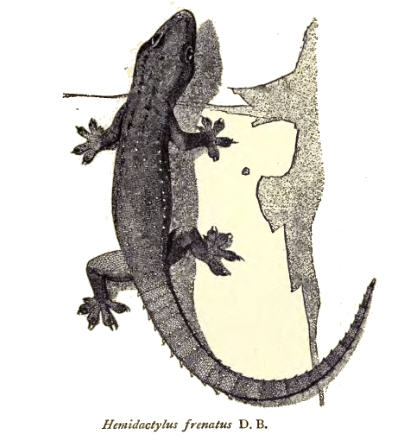
Illustration

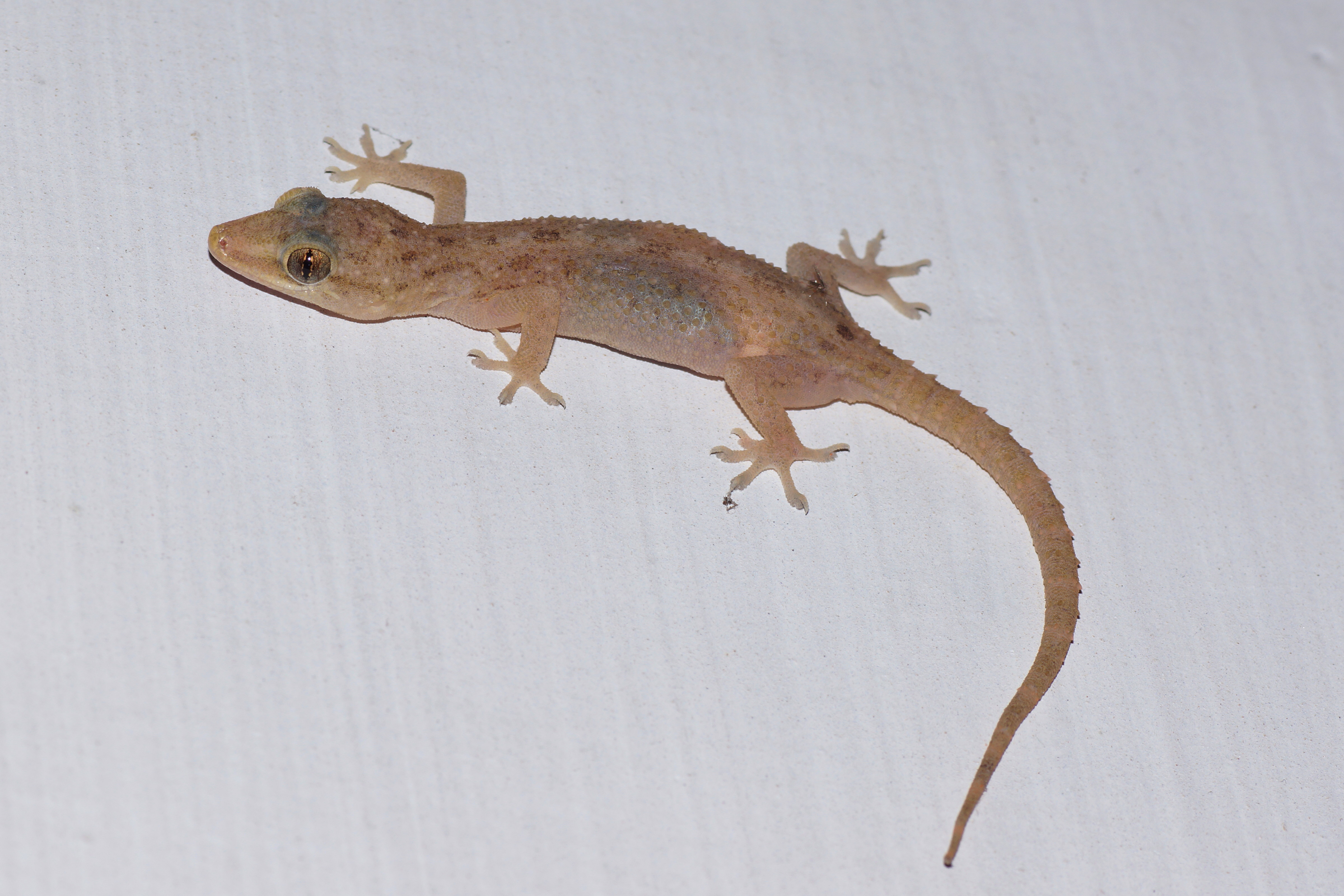
Dorsal view

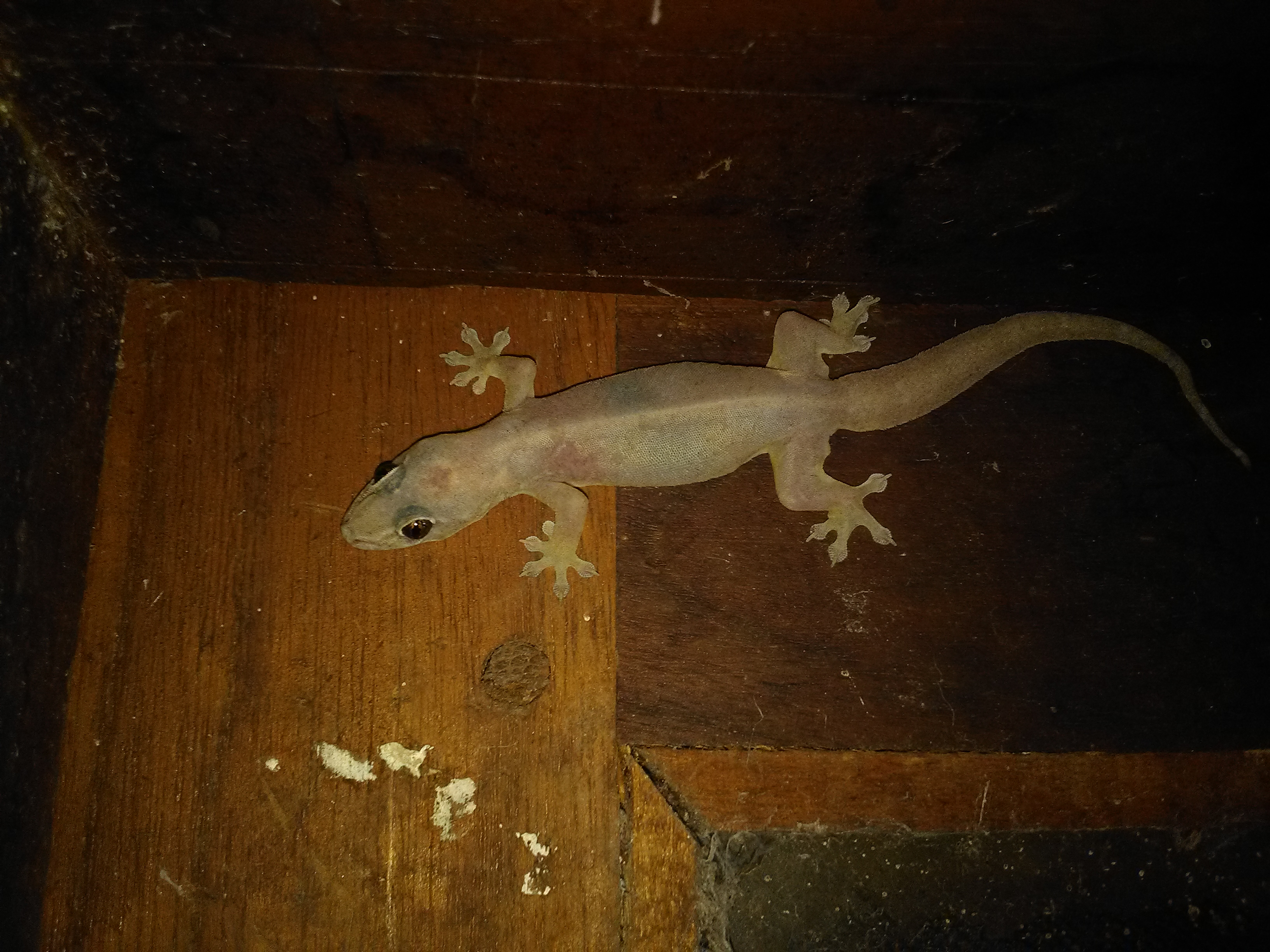
Dorsal view

====== Hemidactylus maculatus (spotted leaf-toed gecko) ======
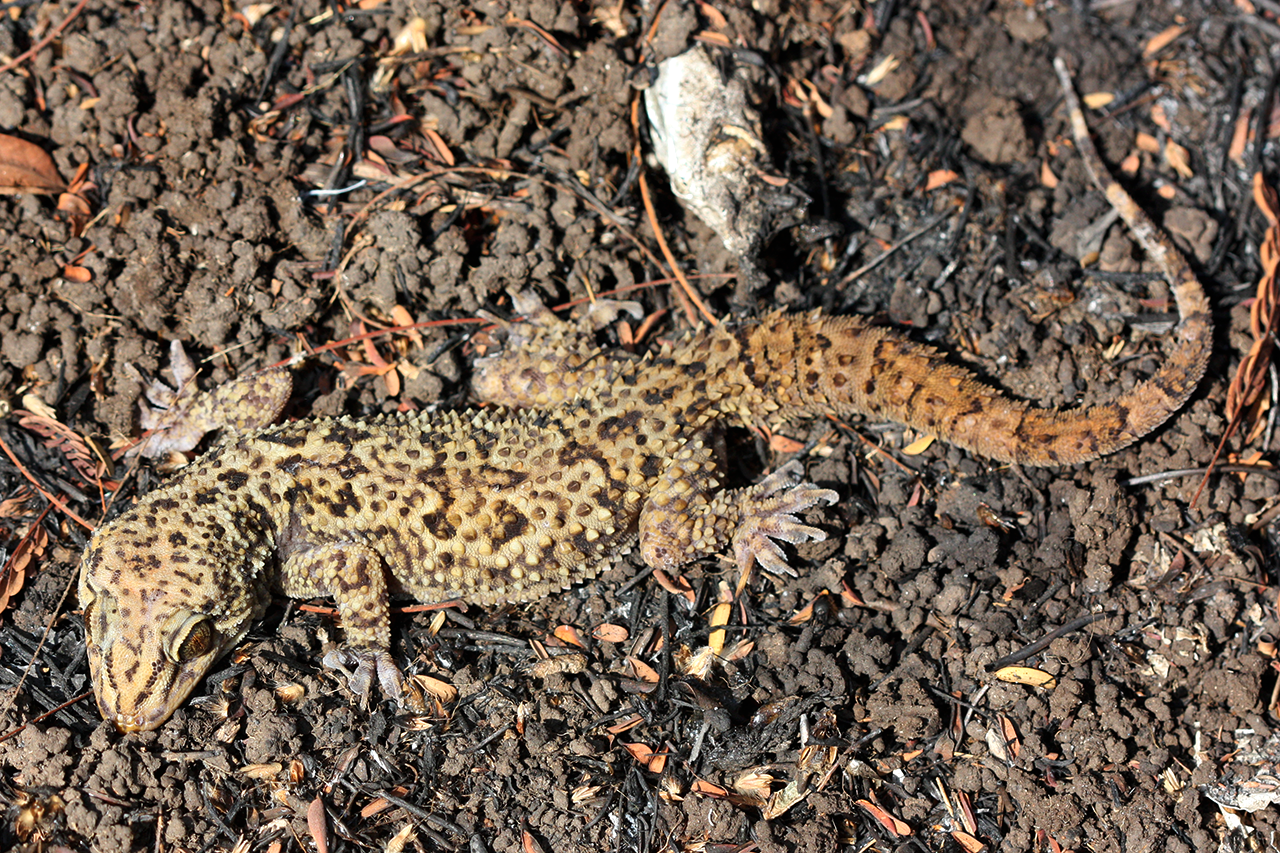
Dorsal view

====== Hemidactylus prashadi (Bombay leaf-toed gecko) ======
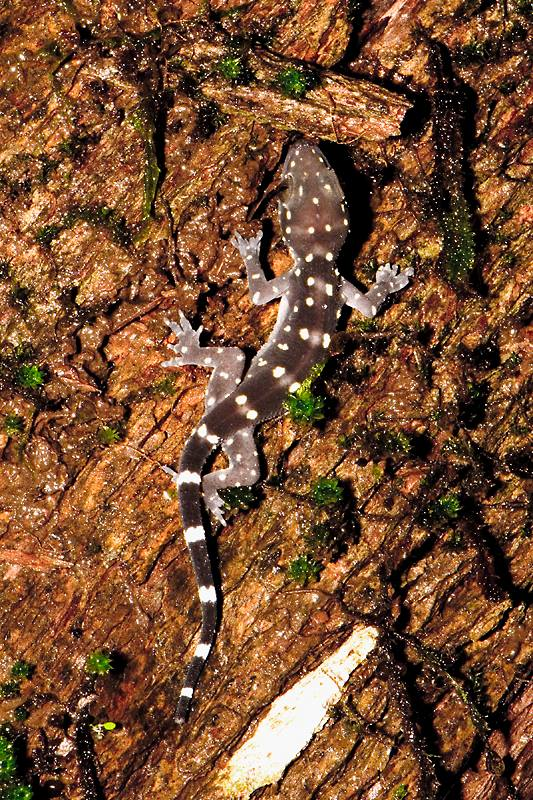
Dorsal view

====== Hemidactylus reticulatus (reticulate leaf-toed gecko) ======
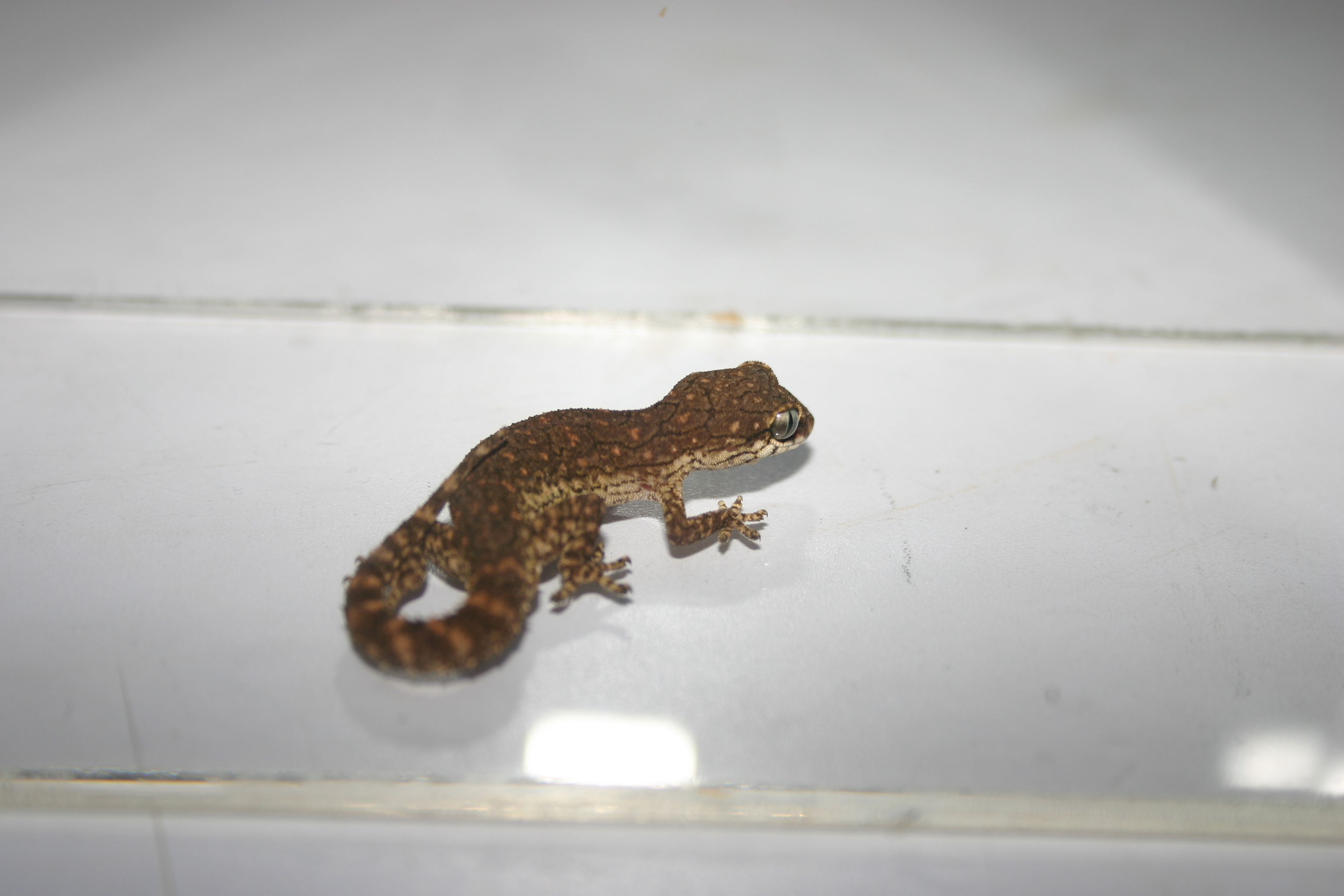
Dorsal view

====== Hemidactylus triedrus (termite hill gecko) ======
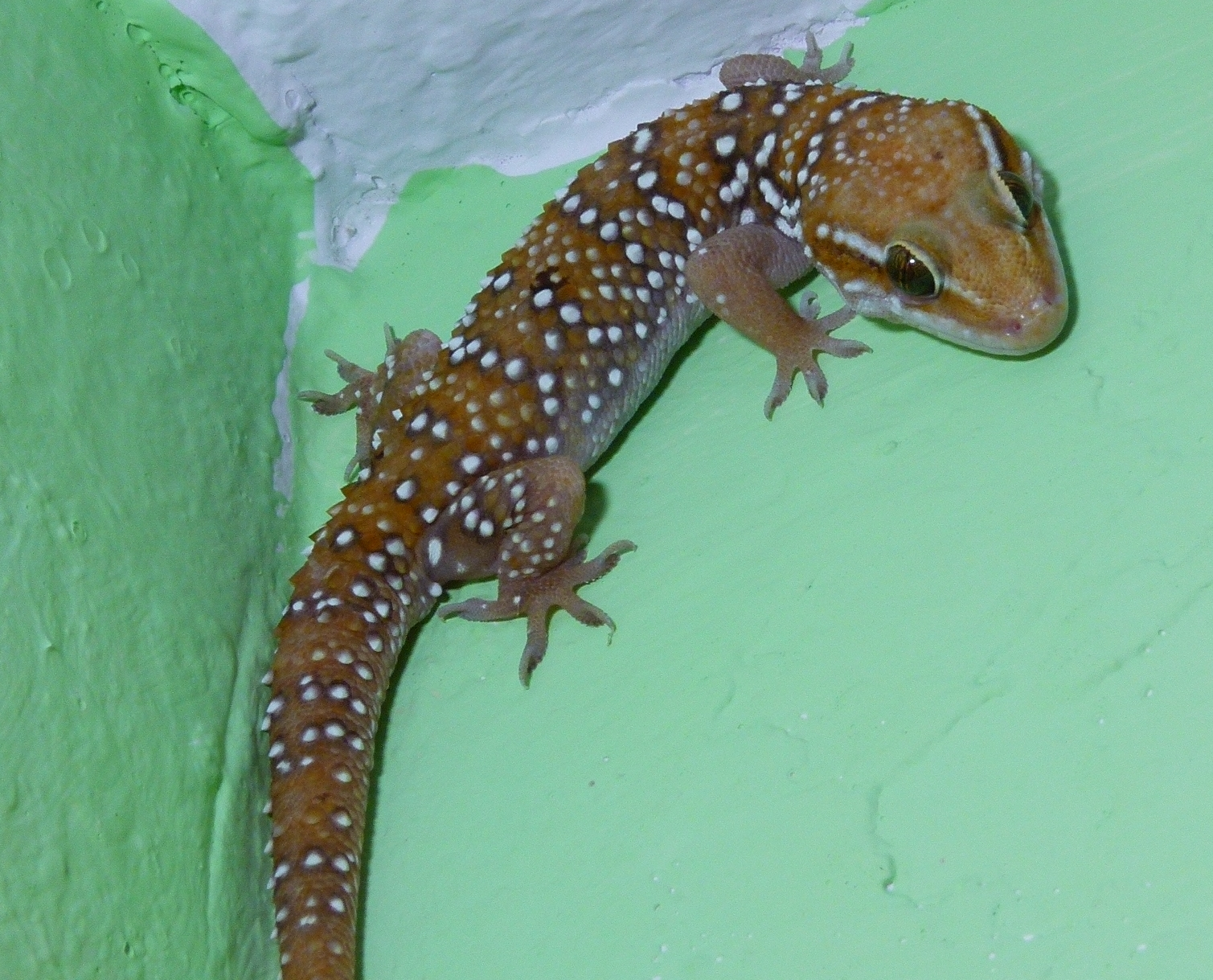
Dorsal view

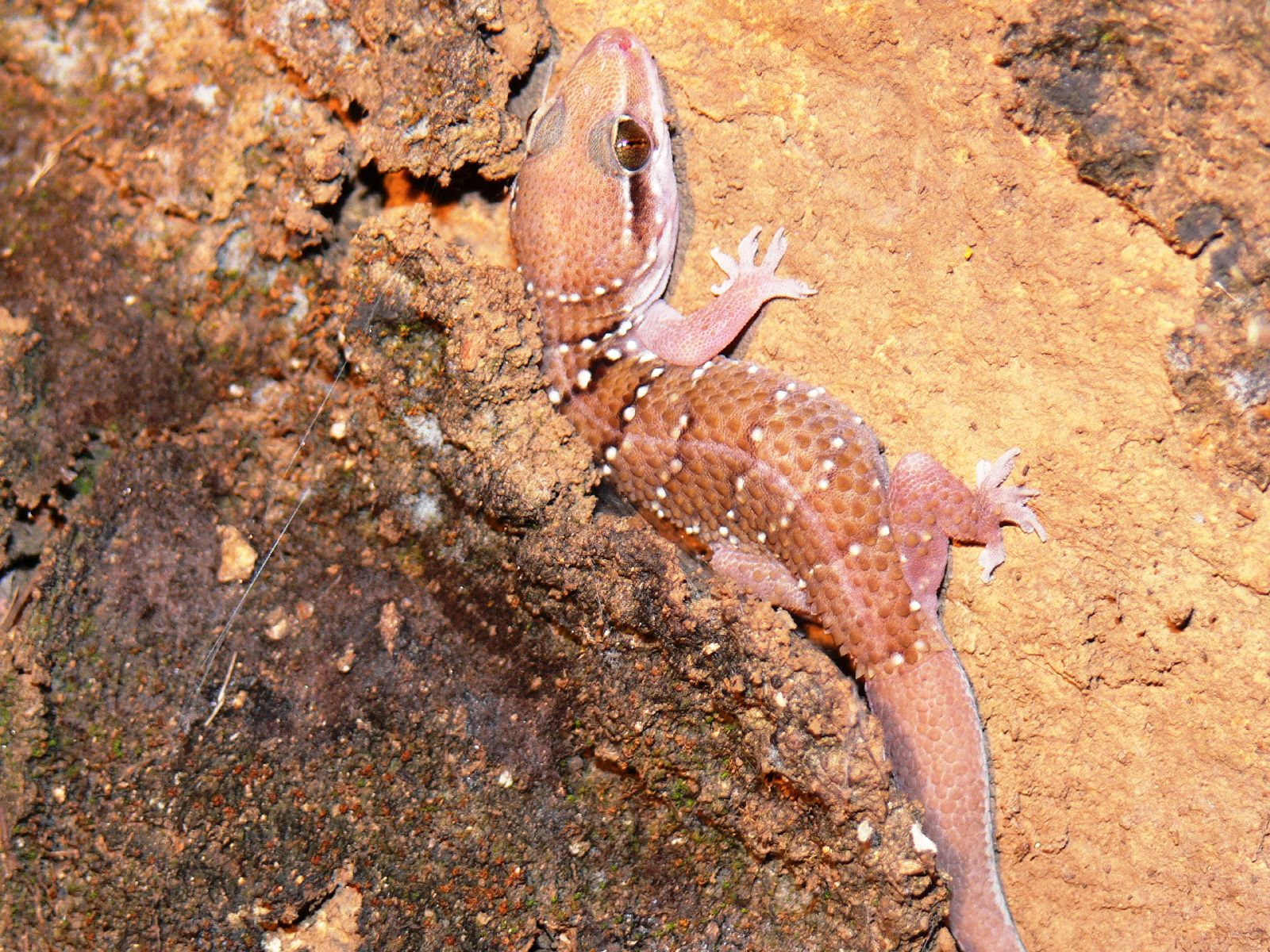
Dorsal view

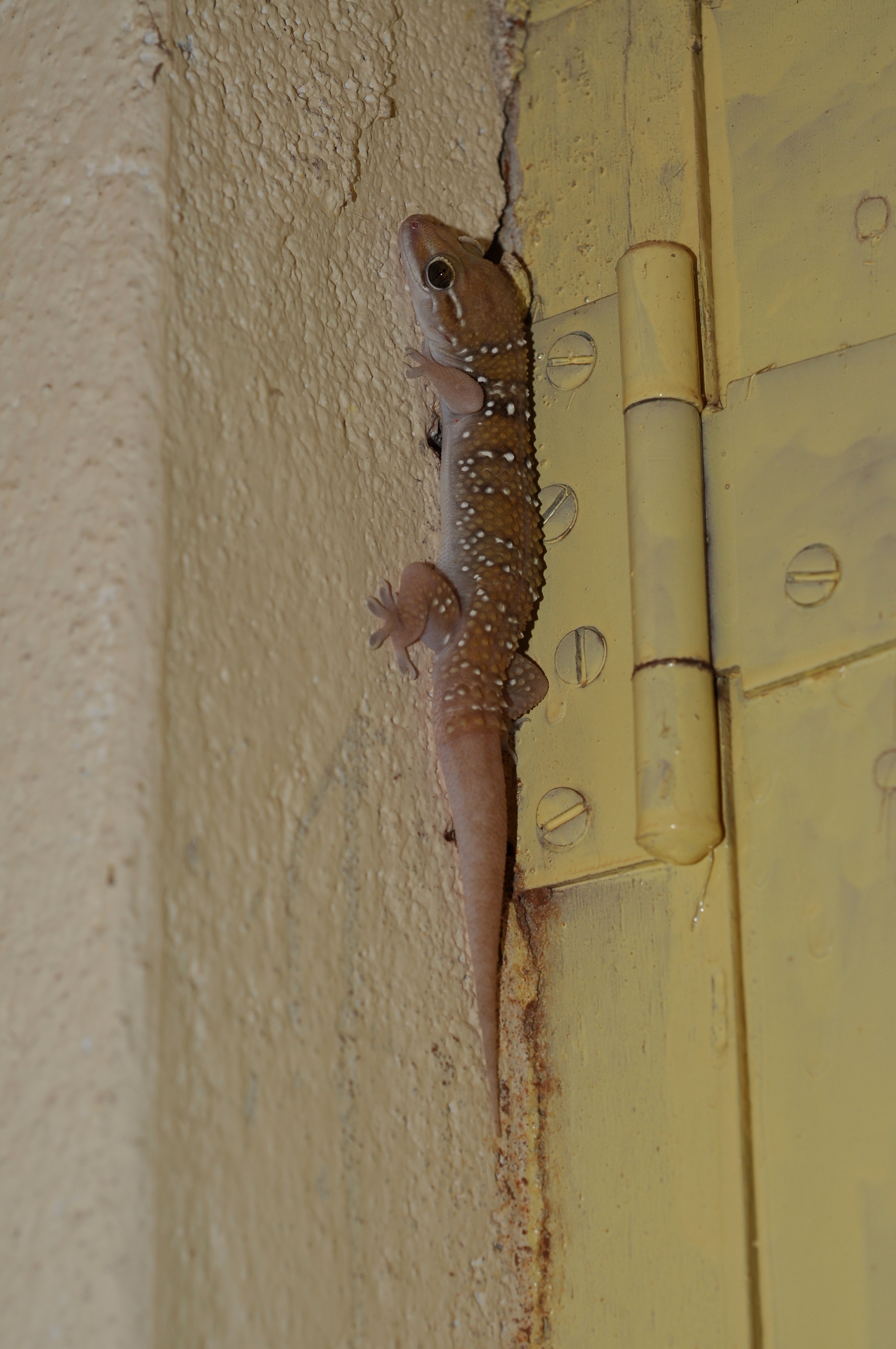
Dorsal view

==== Family: Lacertidae (lacertas) ====
===== Genus: Ophisops =====
====== Ophisops beddomei (Beddome's snake-eye/lacerta) ======
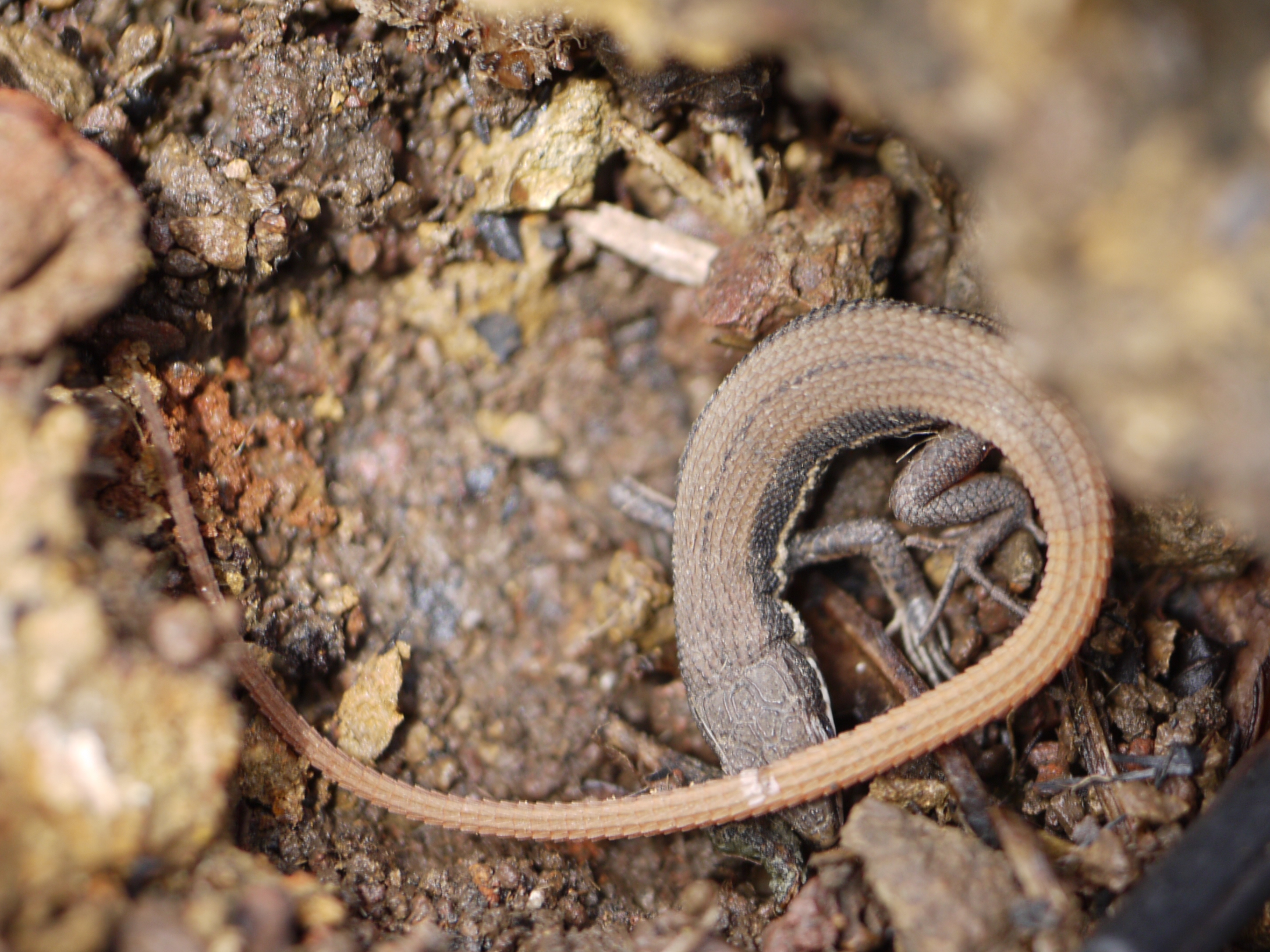
Dorsal view

====== Ophisops leschenaultii (Leschenault's snake-eye/lacerta) ======
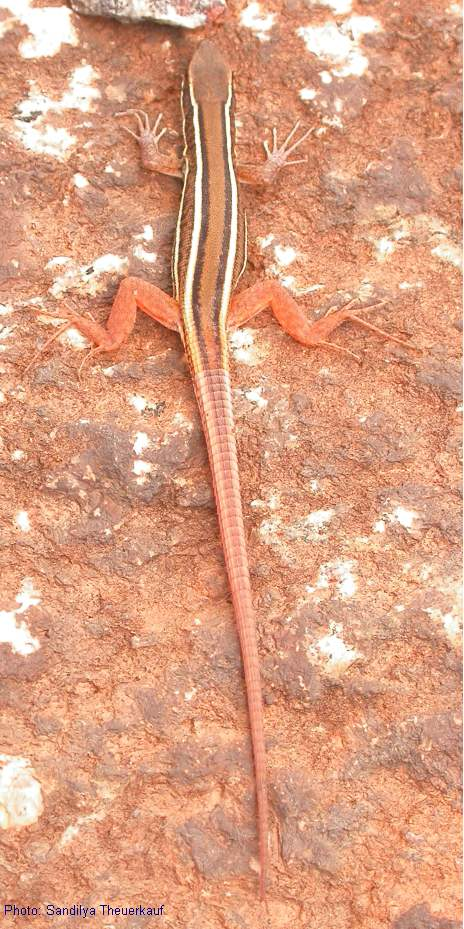
Dorsal view

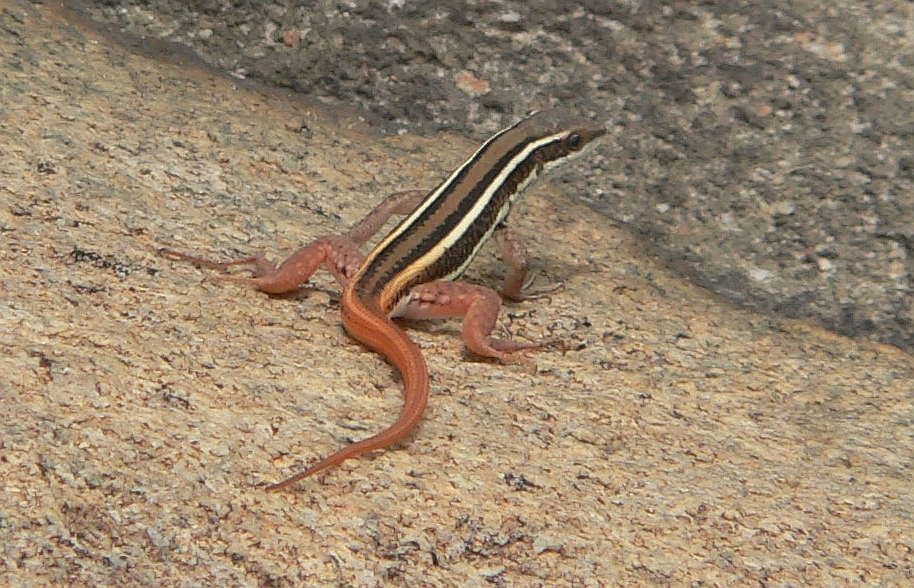
Dorsal view

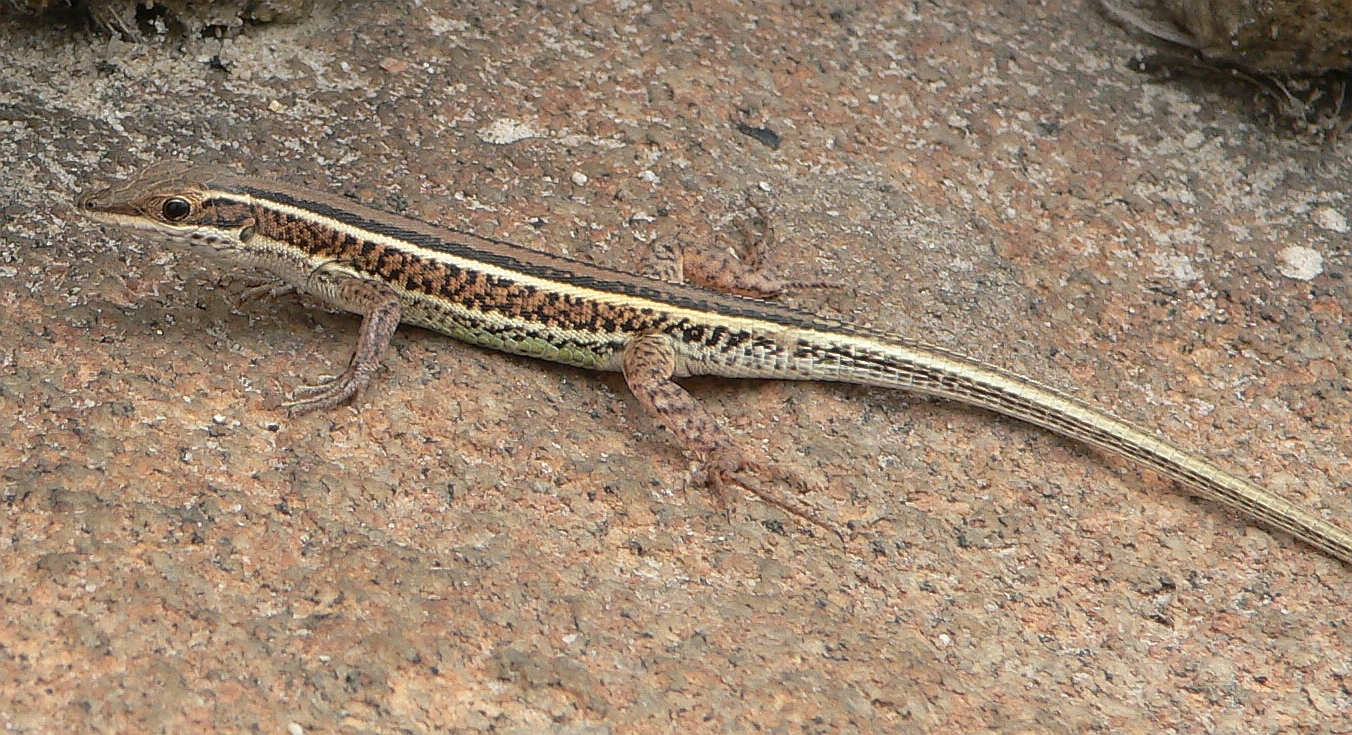
Lateral view

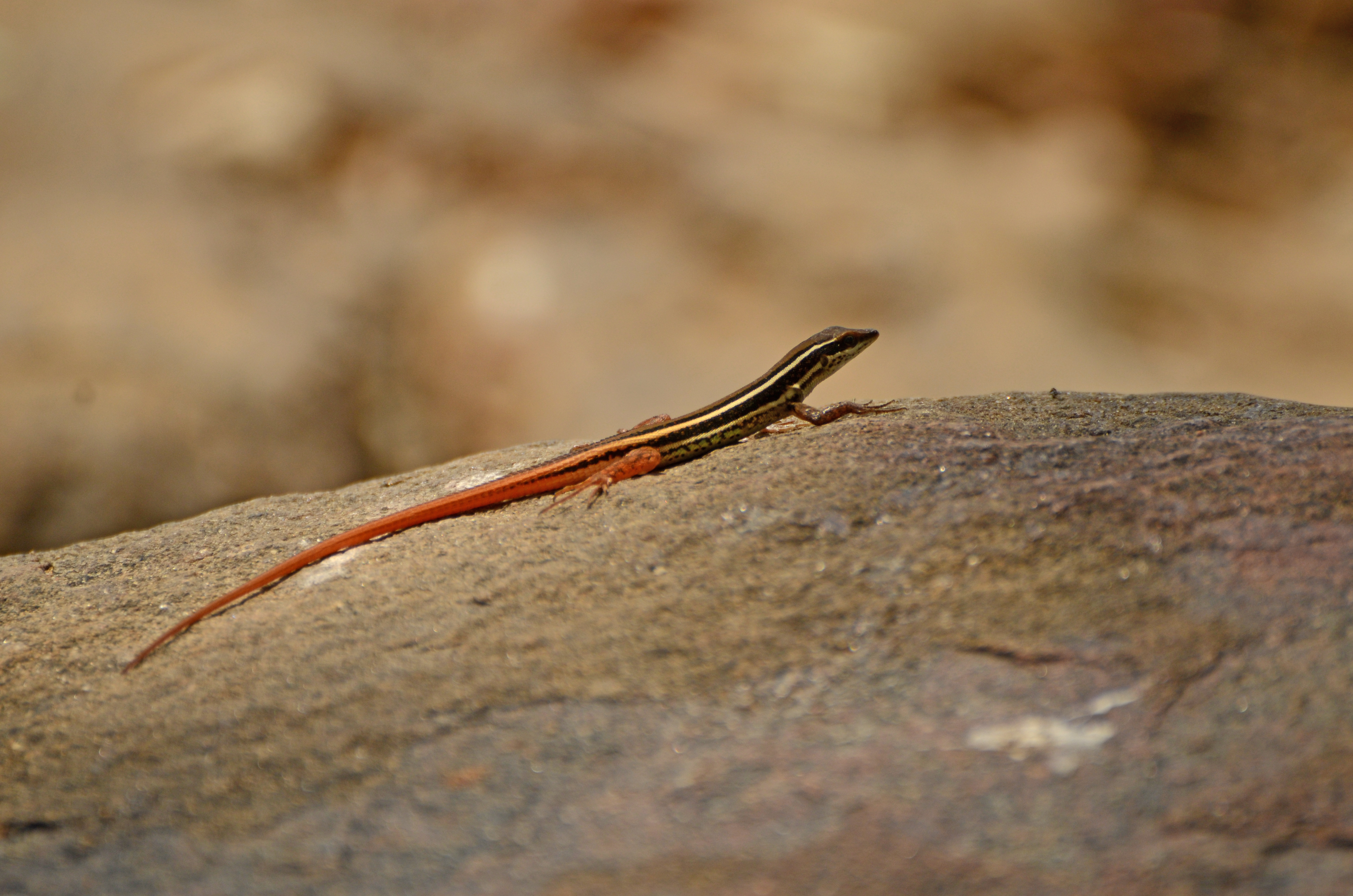
Lateral view

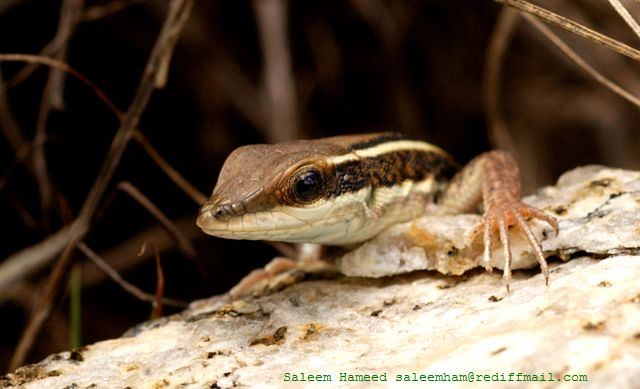
Head

==== Family: Scincidae (skinks) ====
===== Genus: Chalcides =====
====== Chalcides pentadactylus (five-fingered skink) ======
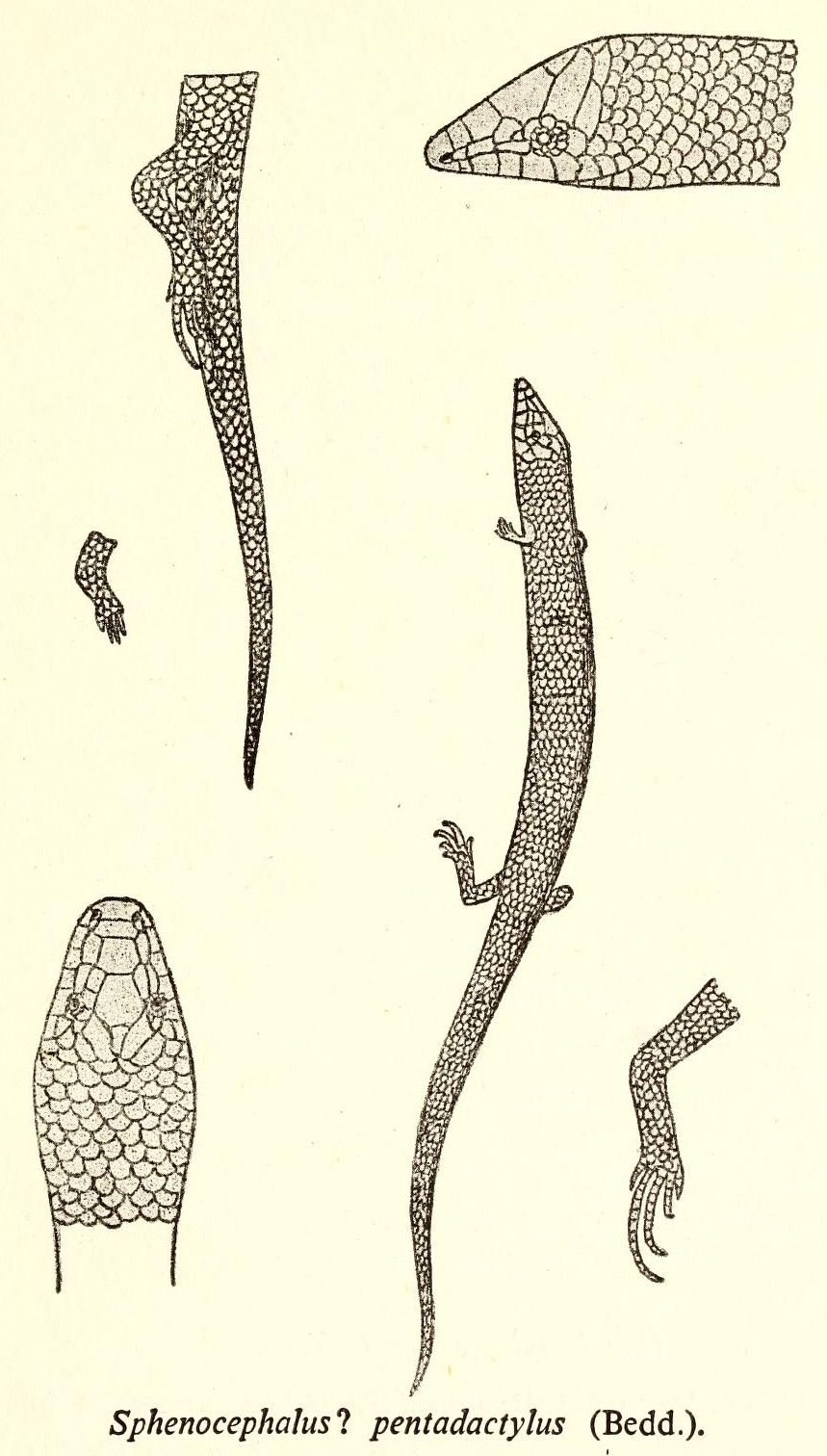
Illustration

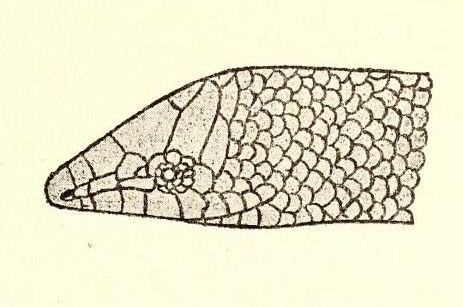
Illustration

===== Genus: Eutropis =====
====== Eutropis carinata (golden skink / അരണ) ======
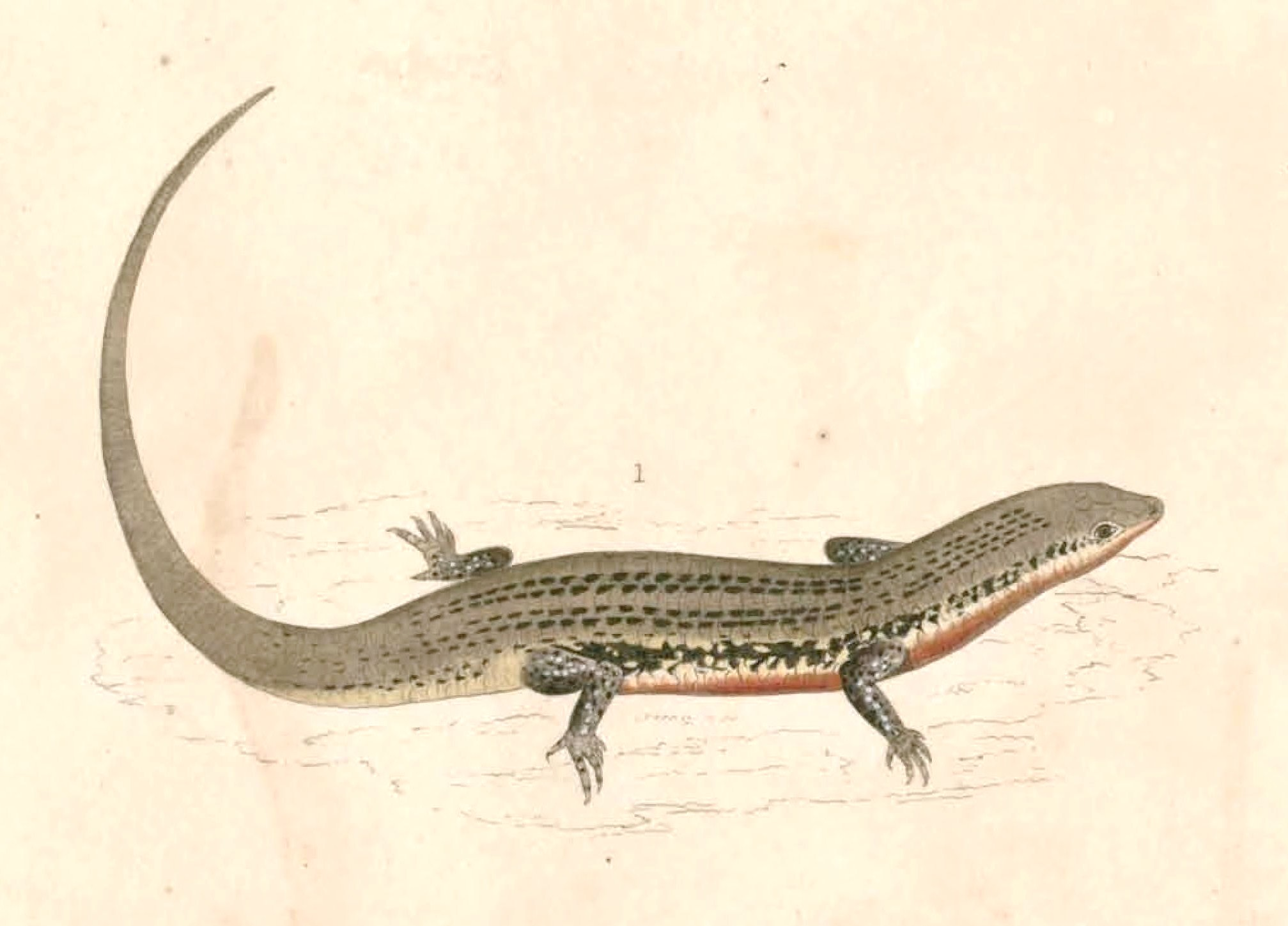
Illustration

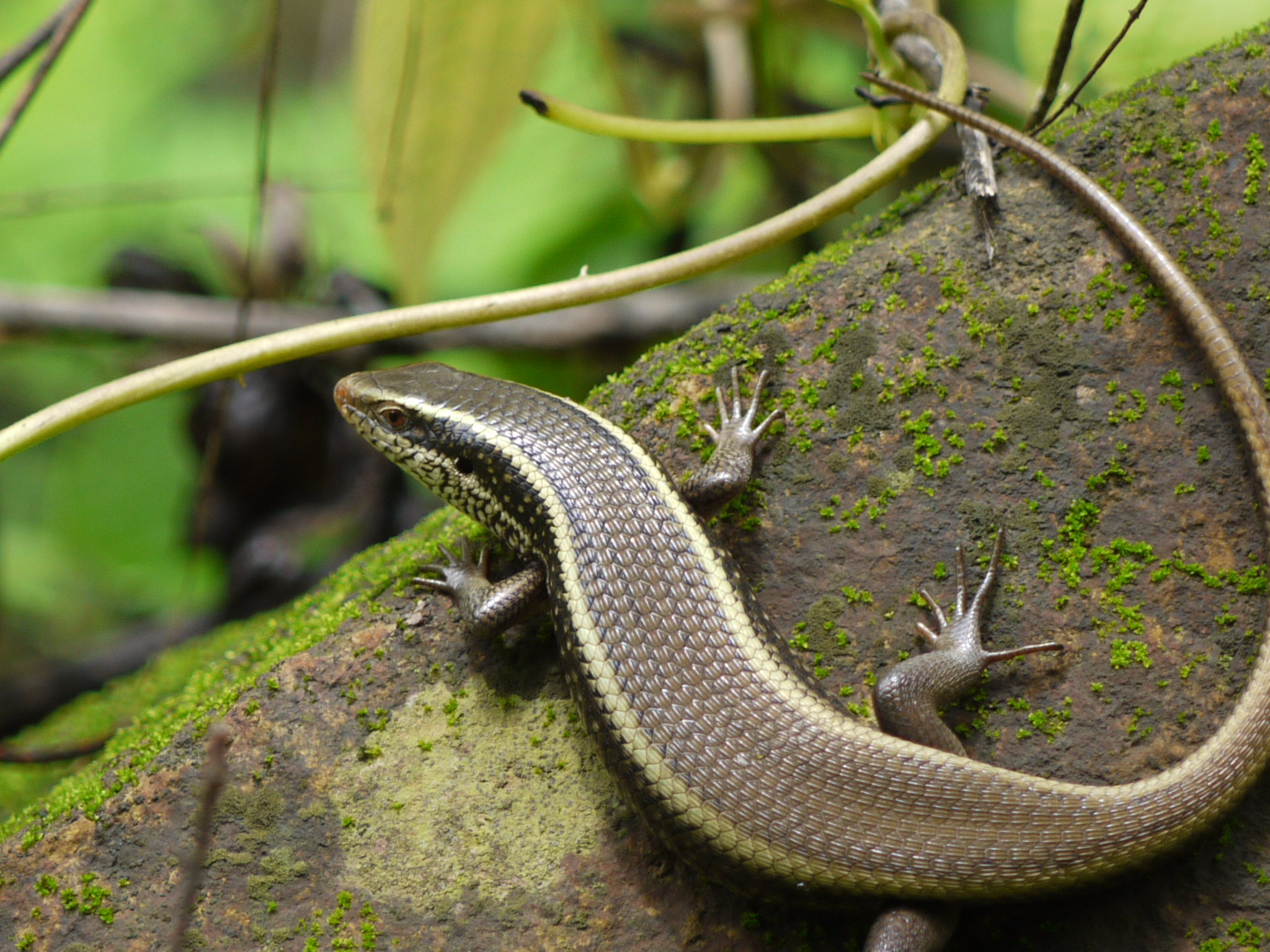
Dorsal view

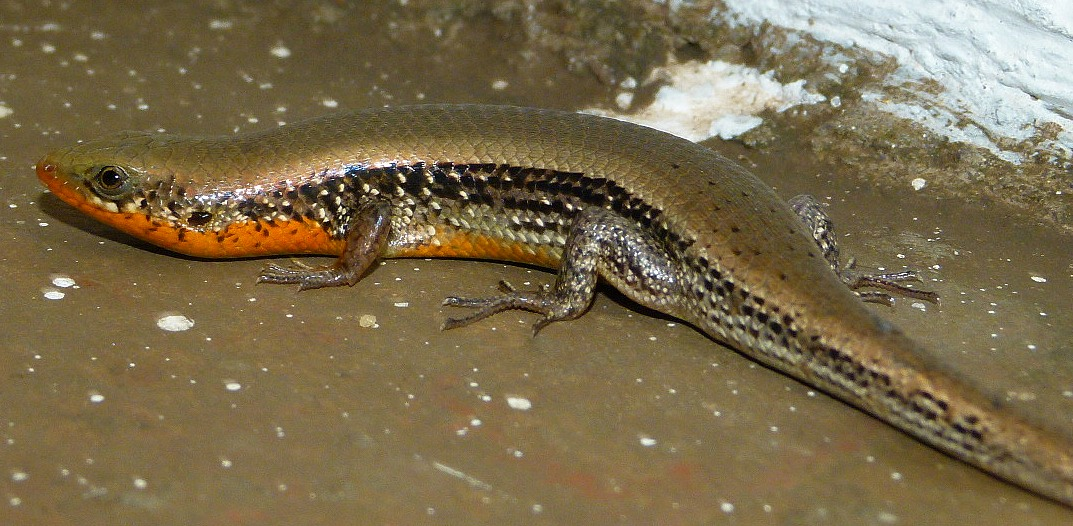
Lateral view

====== Eutropis macularia (bronze grass skink) ======
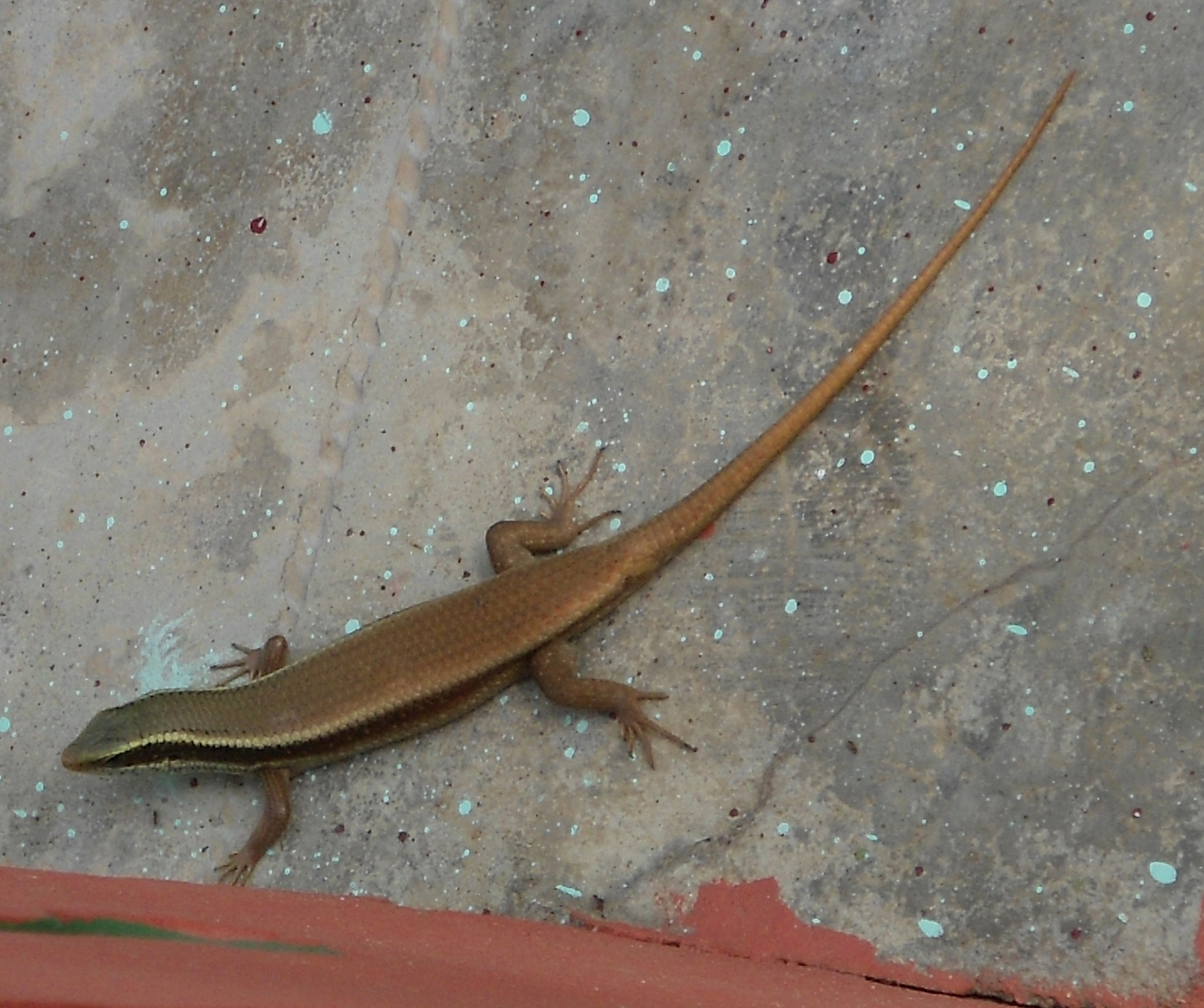
Dorsal view

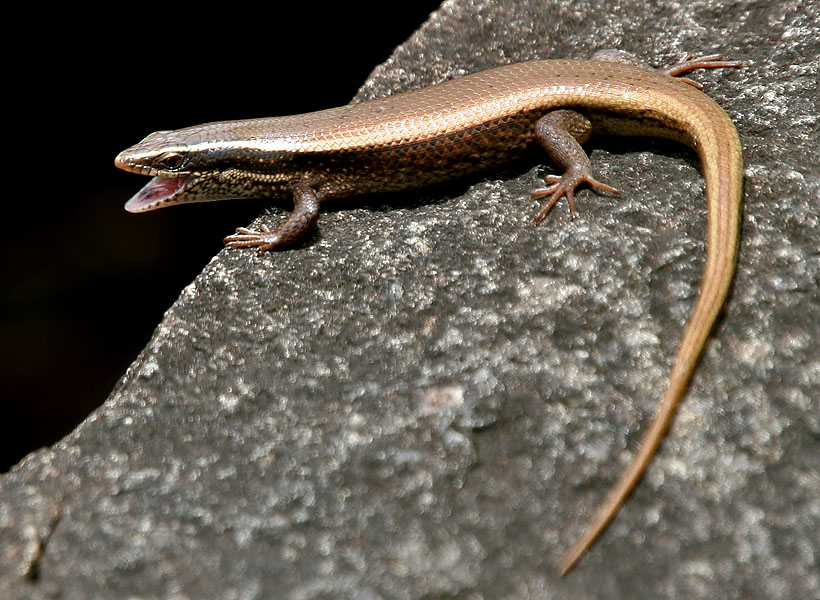
Lateral view

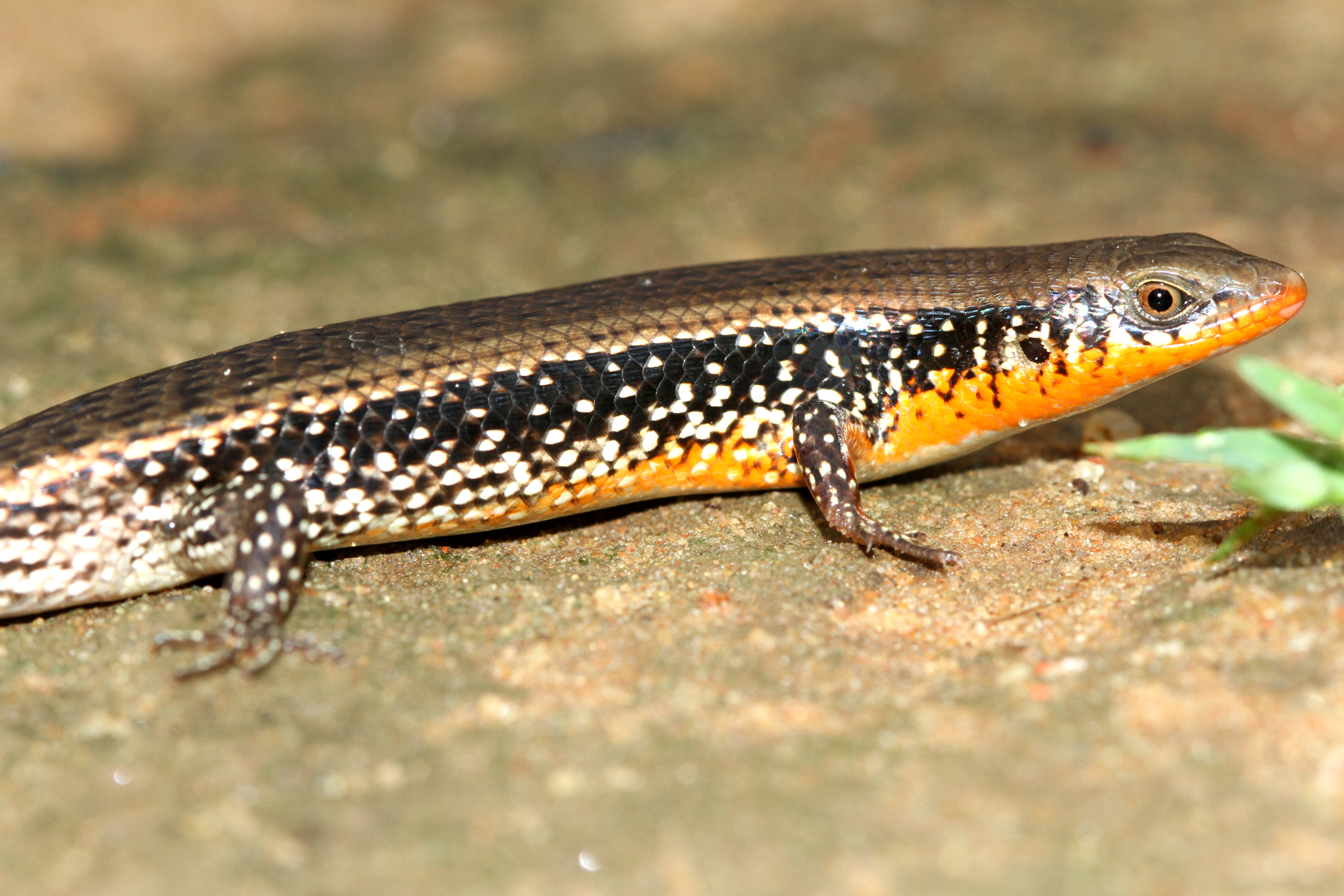
Head

===== Genus: Kaestlea/Scincella =====
====== Kaestlea travancorica (Travancore ground skink) ======
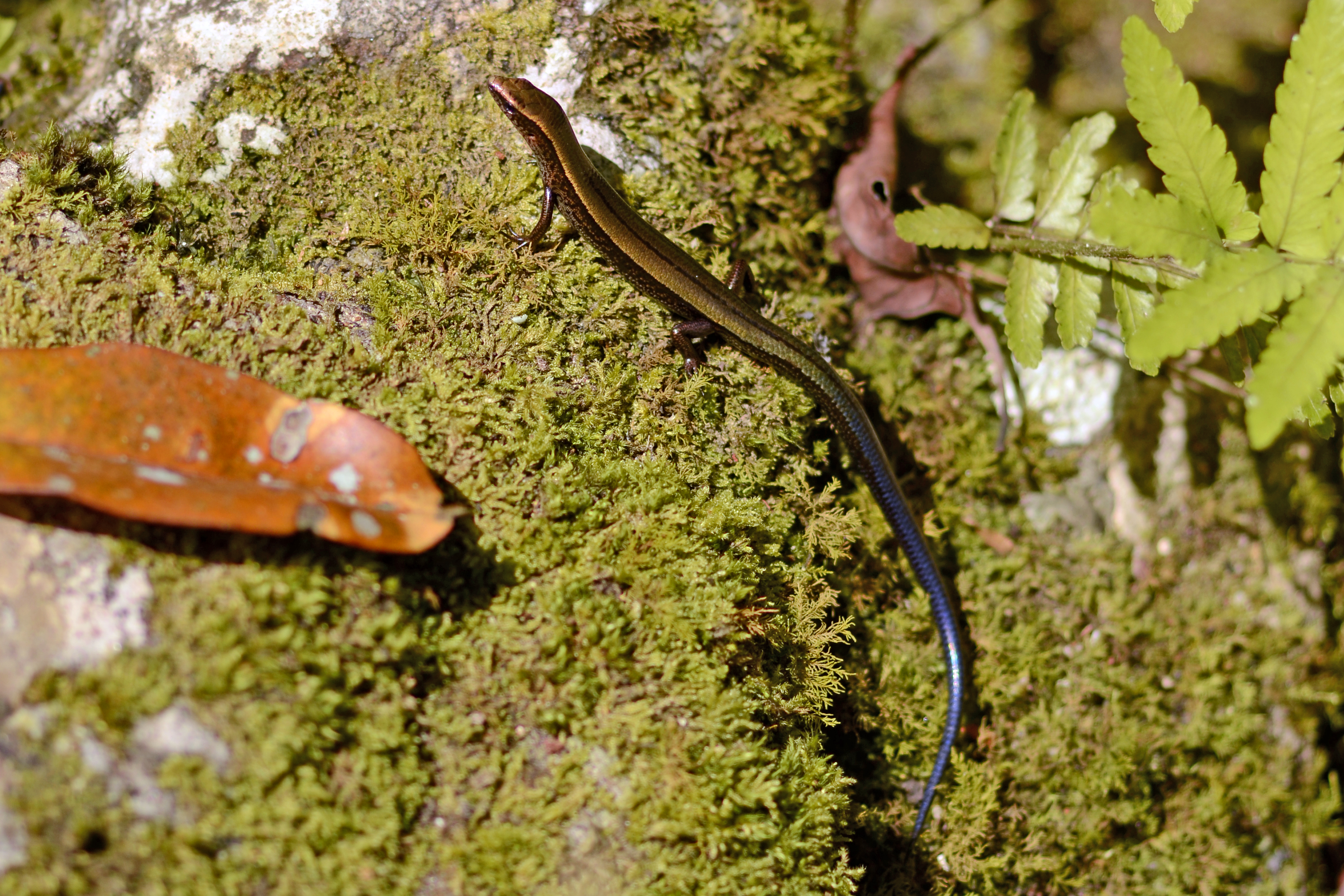
Dorsal view

===== Genus: Lygosoma =====
====== Lygosoma punctata (white-spotted supple skink / പാമ്പരണ) ======
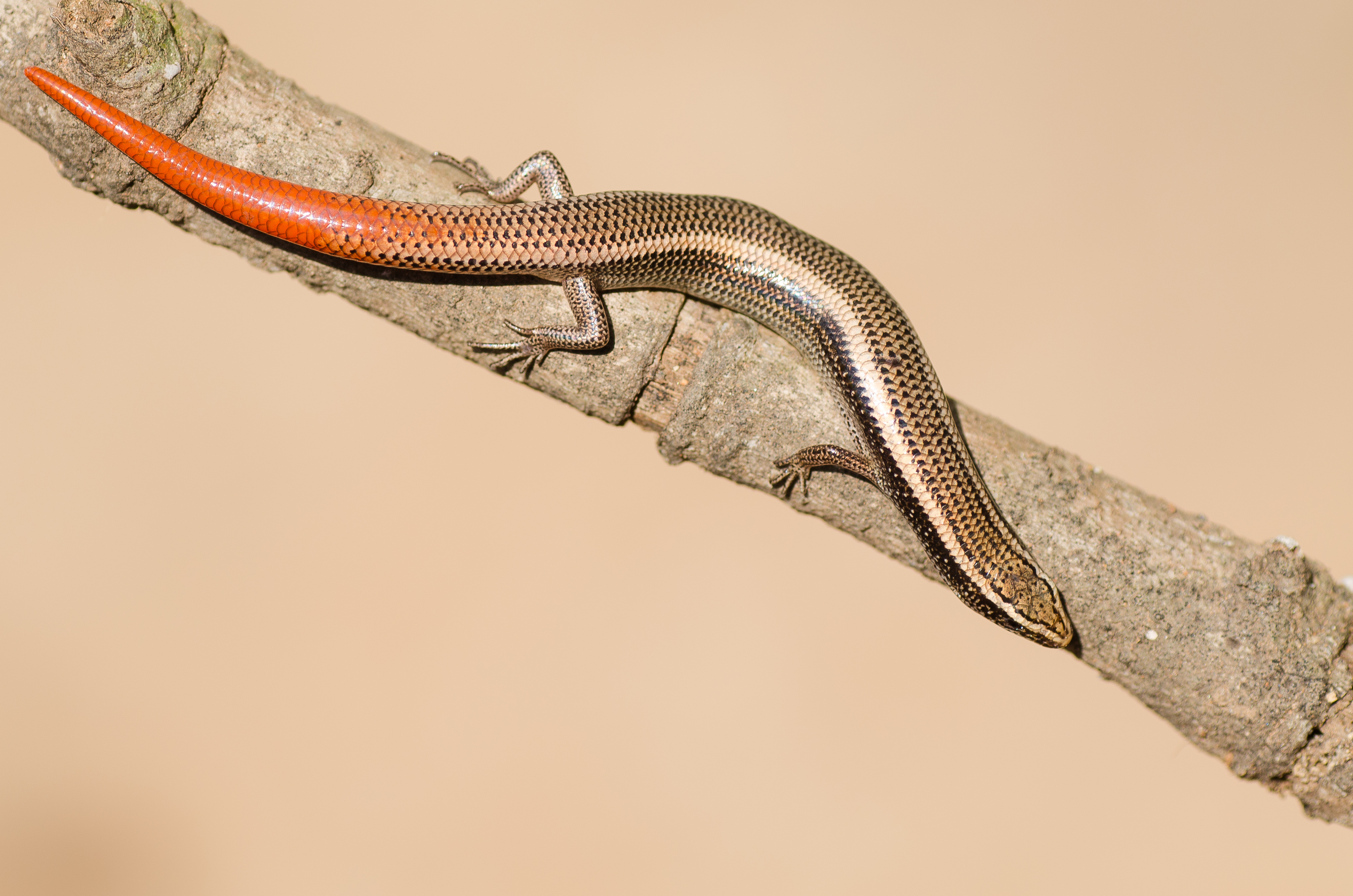
Dorsal view

===== Genus: Ristella =====
====== Ristella rurkii (Rurk's cat skink) ======
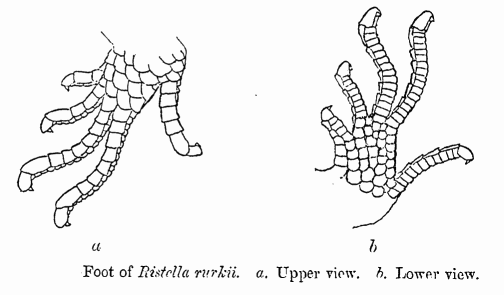
Claw pattern

====== Ristella travancorica (Travancore cat skink) ======
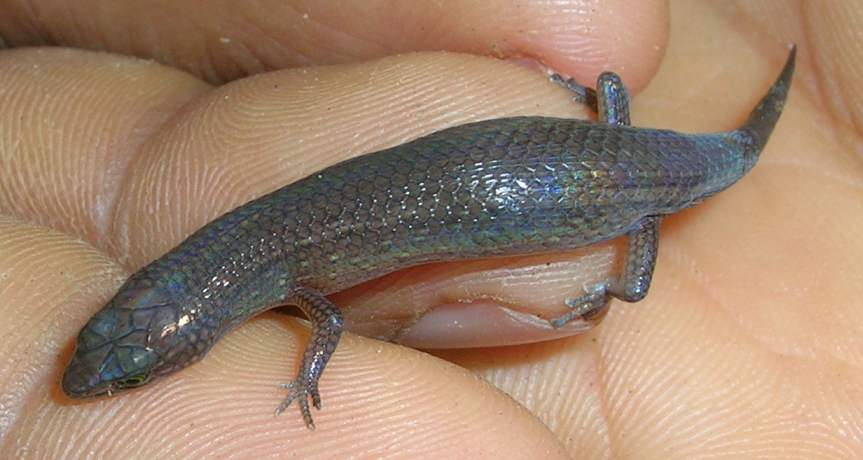
Dorsal view

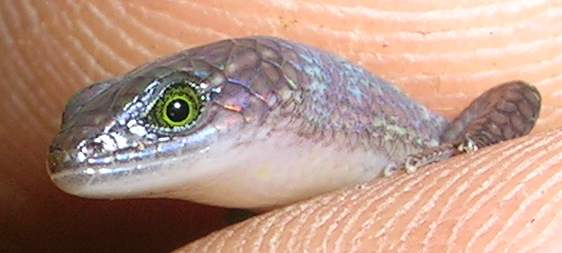
Head

===== Genus: Sphenomorphus =====
====== Sphenomorphus dussumieri (Dussumier's forest skink / കാട്ടരണ) ======
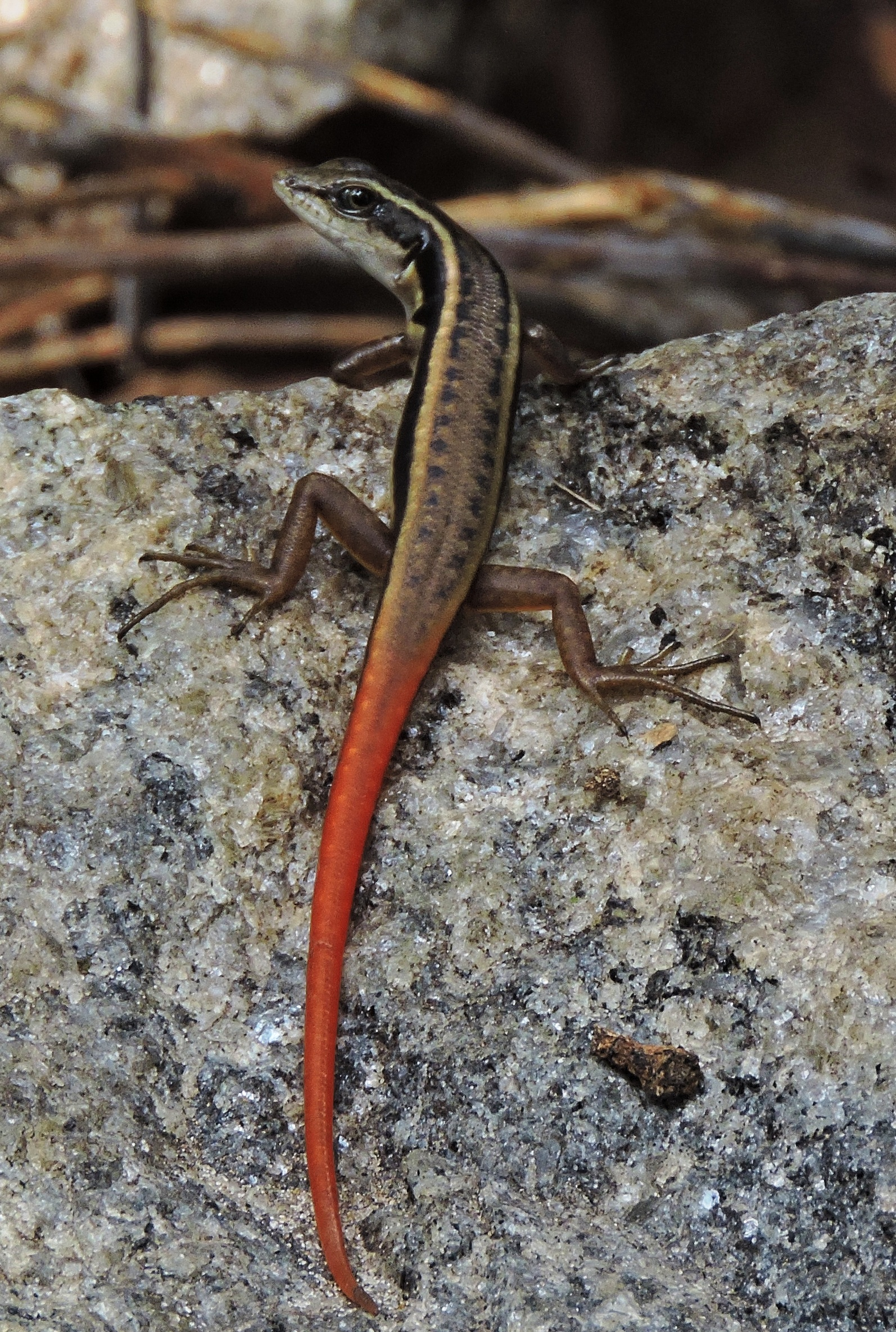
Dorsal view

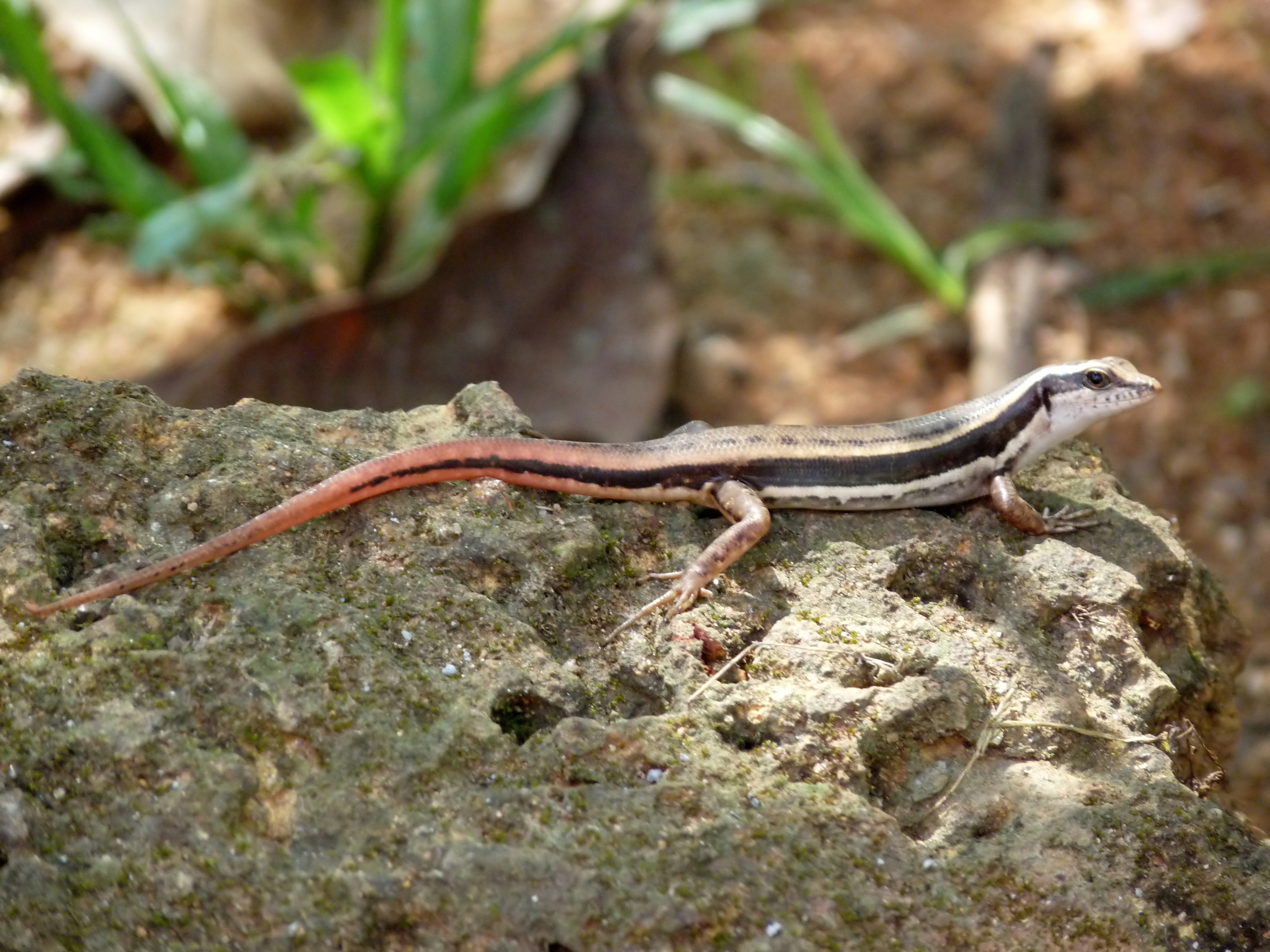
Lateral view

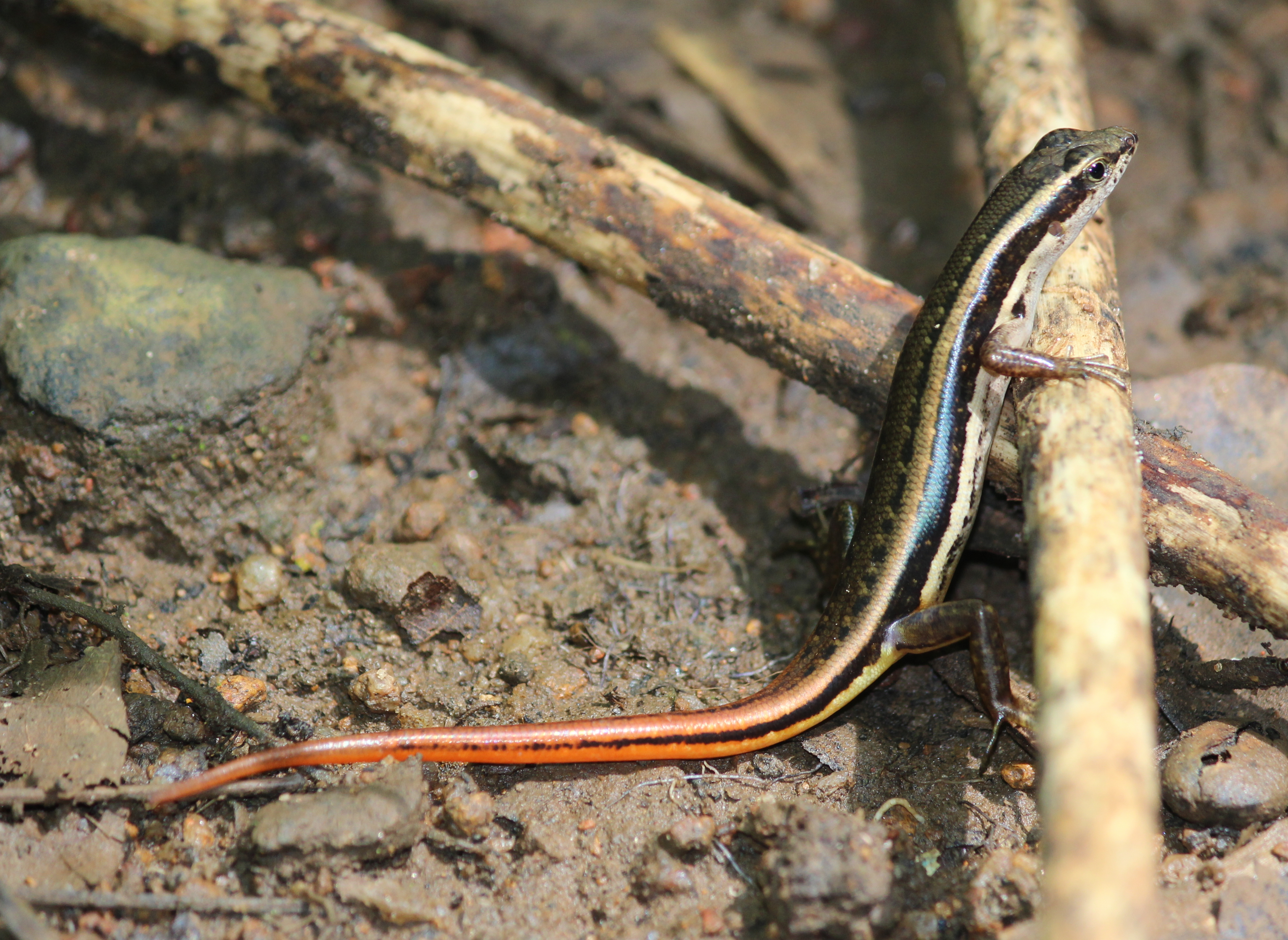
Lateral view

==== Family: Varanidae (monitor lizards) ====
===== Genus: Varanus =====
====== Varanus bengalensis (Bengal/Indian monitor / ഉടുമ്പ്) ======
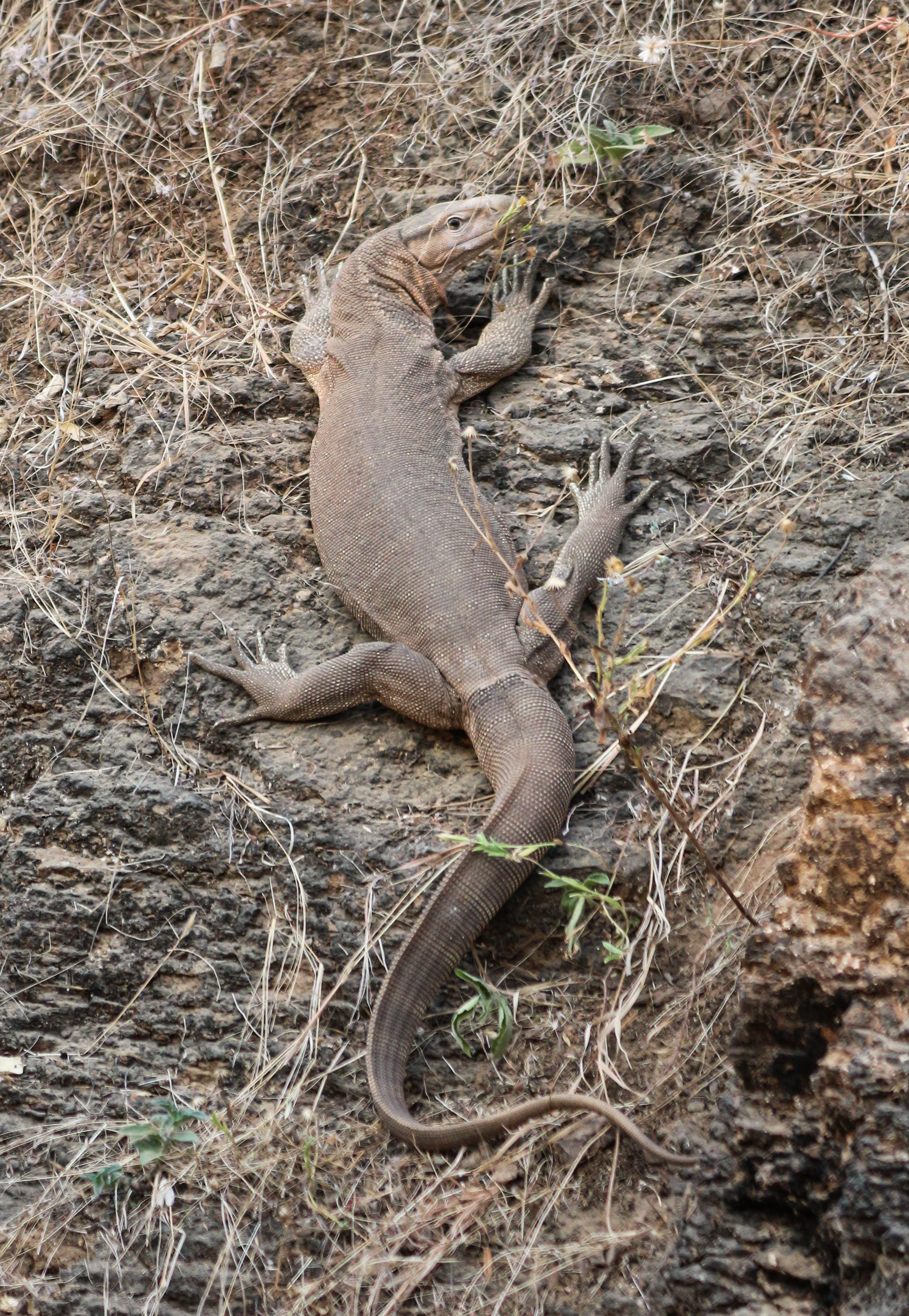
Dorsal view

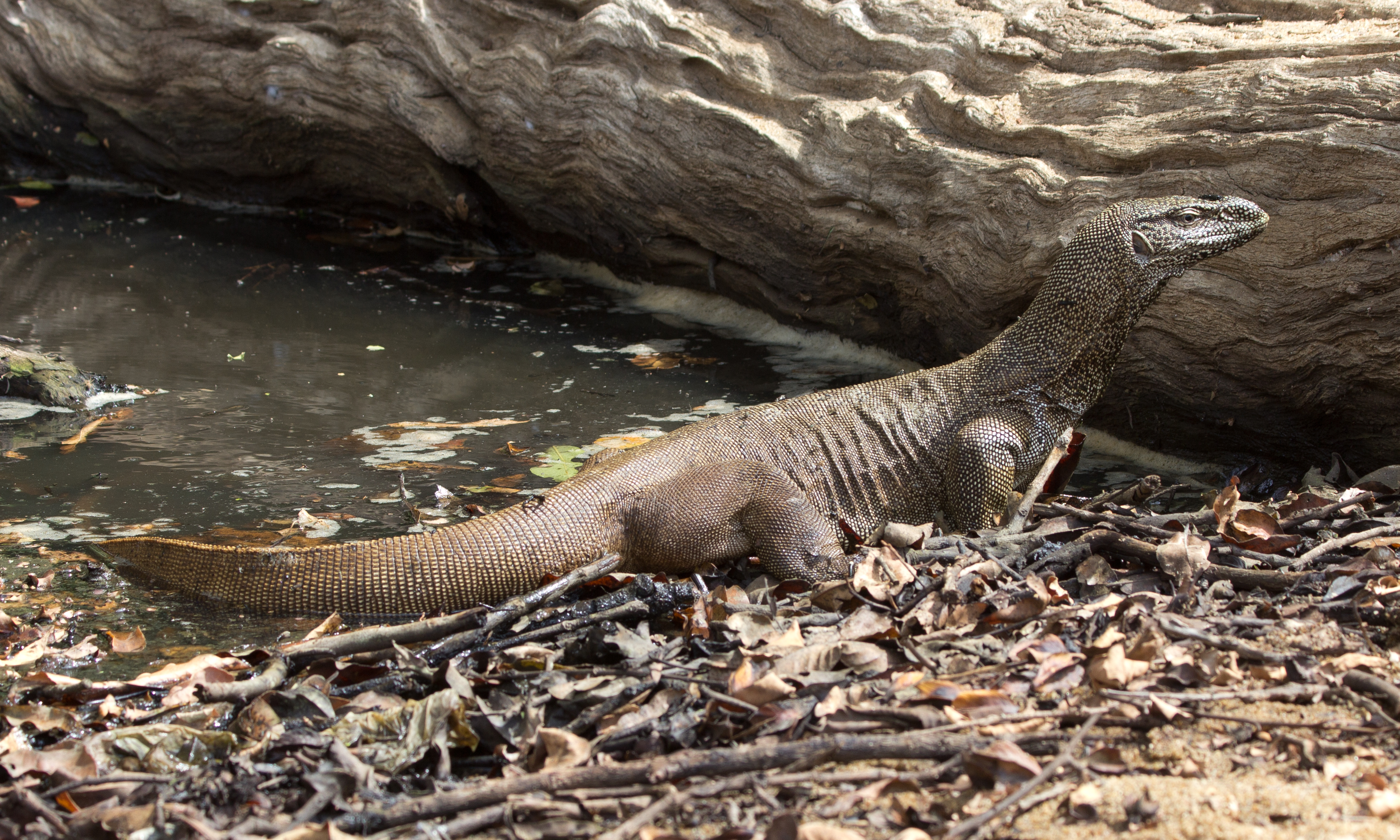
Lateral view

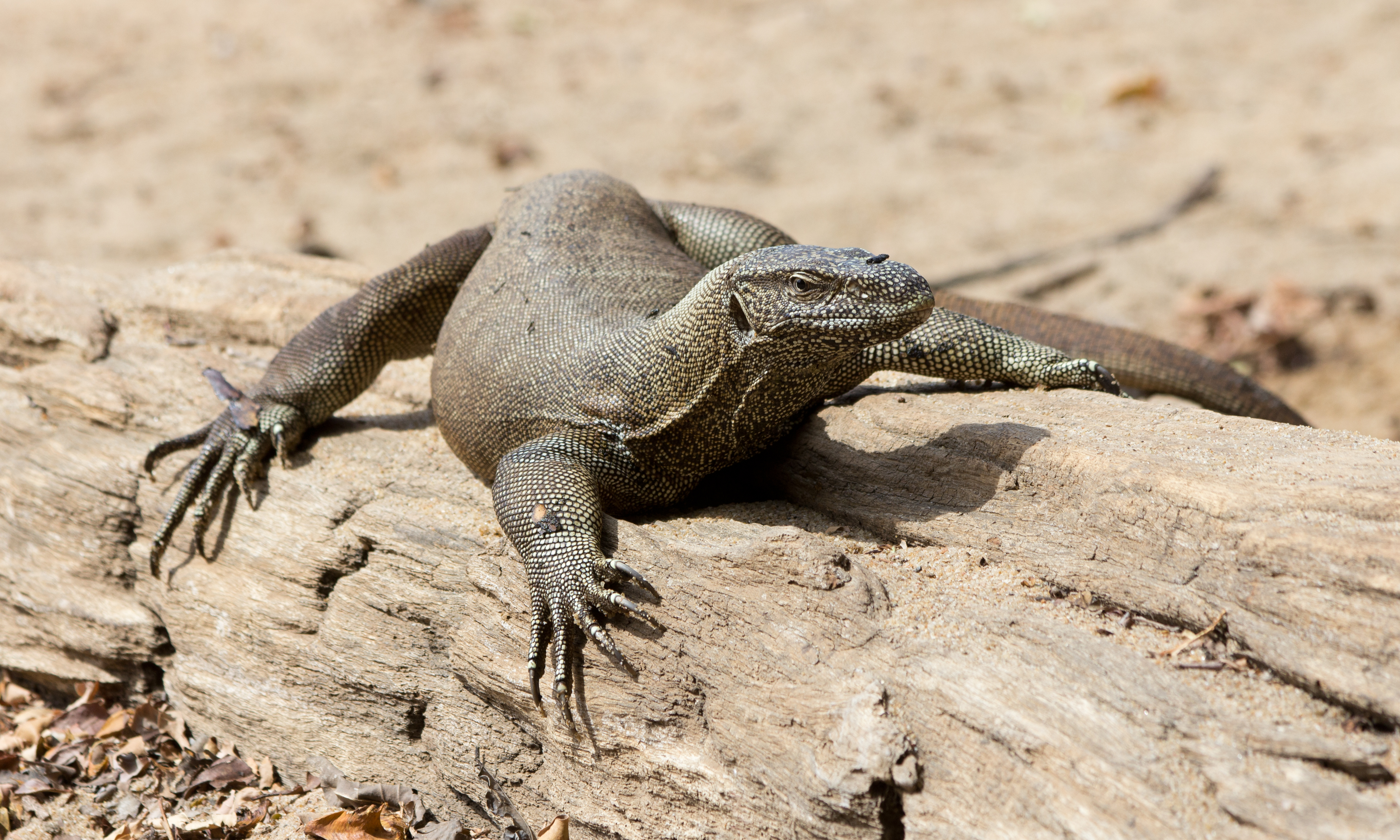
Front view

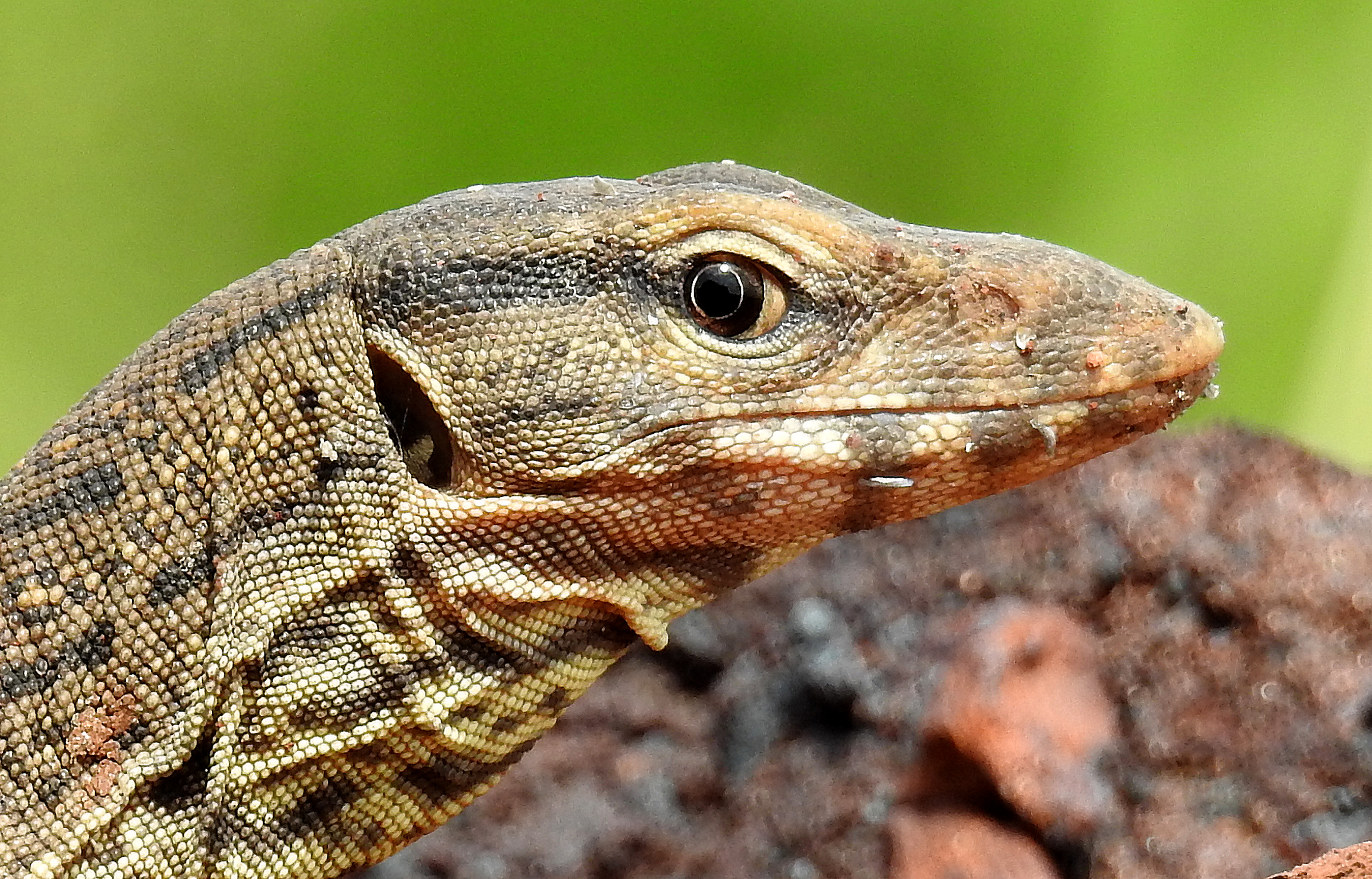
Head

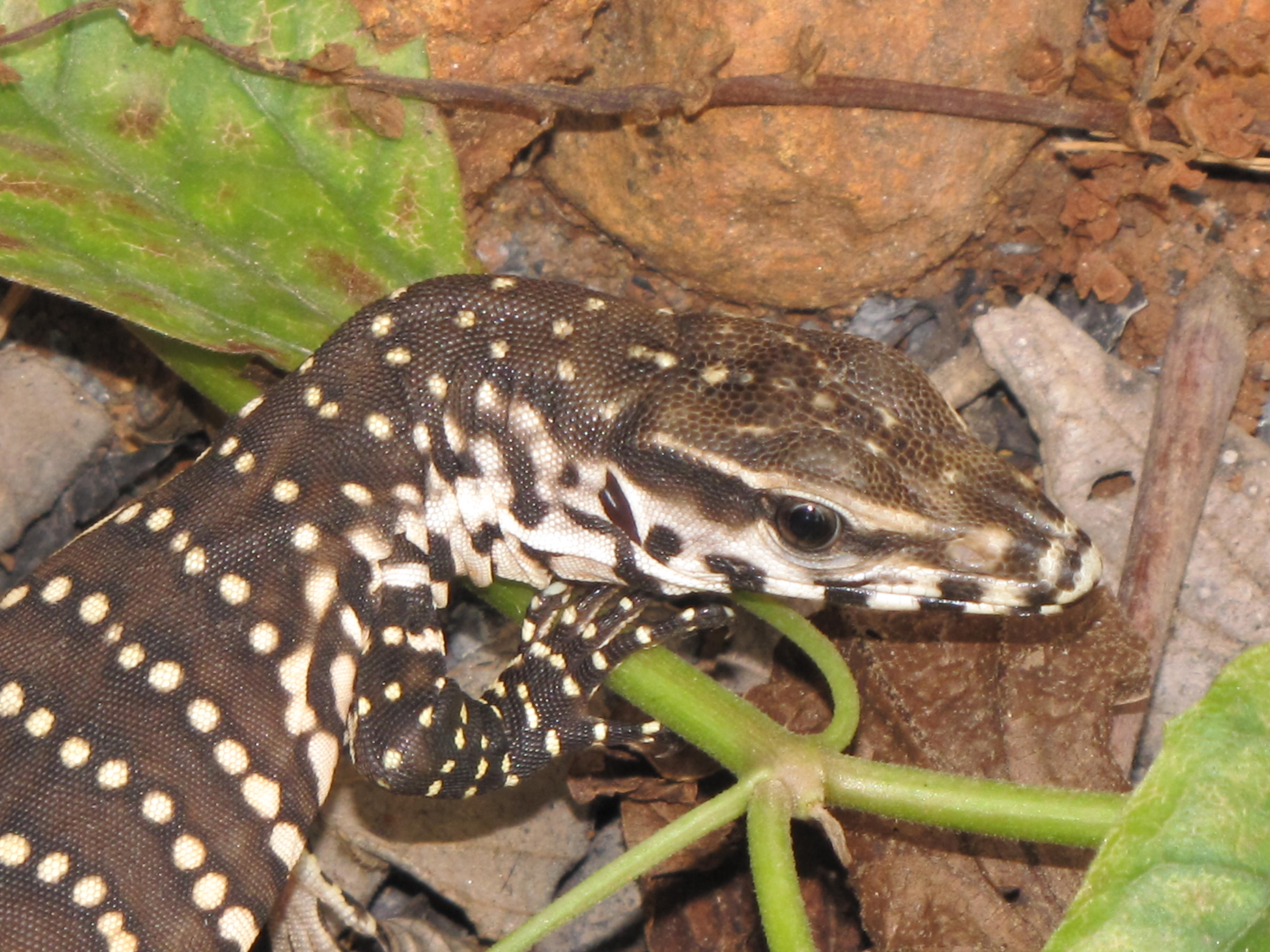
Head (juvenile)

=== Suborder: Serpentes ===
==== Family: Acrochordidae (file snakes) ====
===== Genus: Acrochordus =====
====== Acrochordus granulatus (marine file snake / കായൽ പാമ്പ്) ======
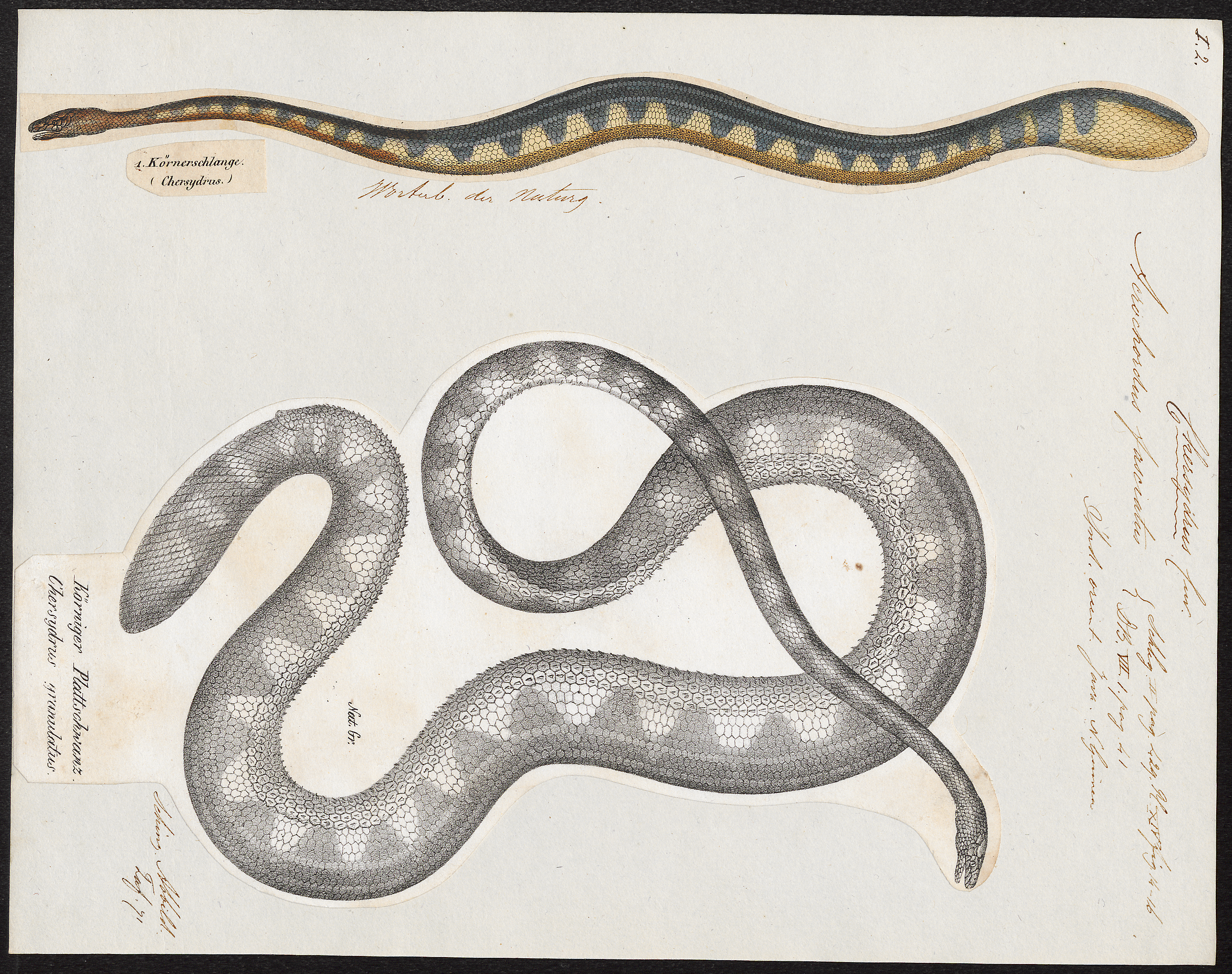
Illustration

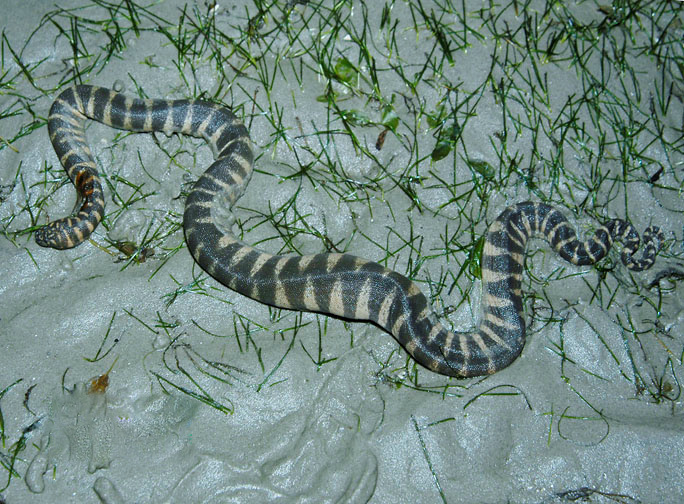
Lateral view

==== Family: Colubridae (colubrid snakes) ====
===== Genus: Ahaetulla =====
====== Ahaetulla dispar (Gunther's vine snake / മലമ്പച്ചോലൻ പാമ്പ്) ======
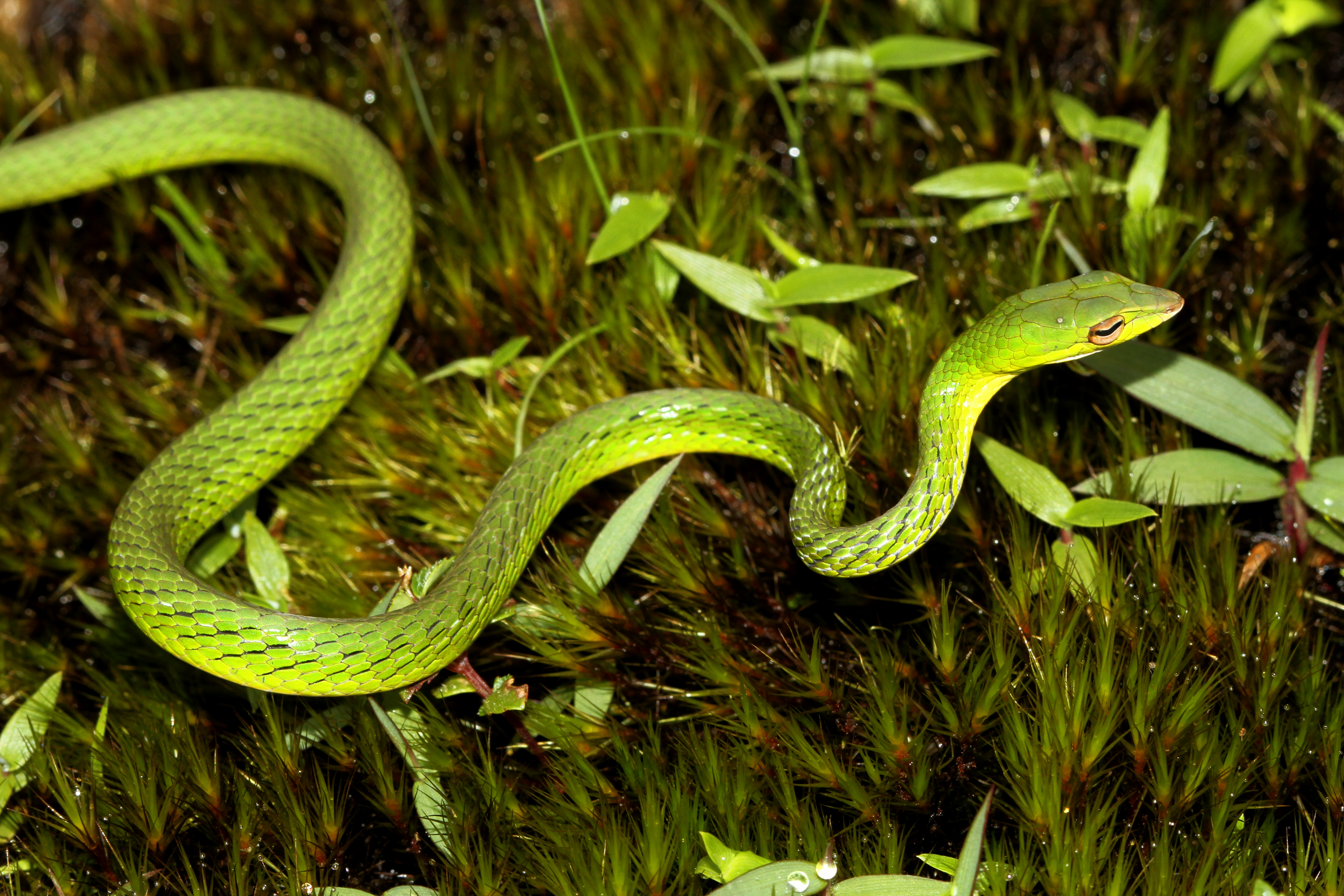
Dorsal view

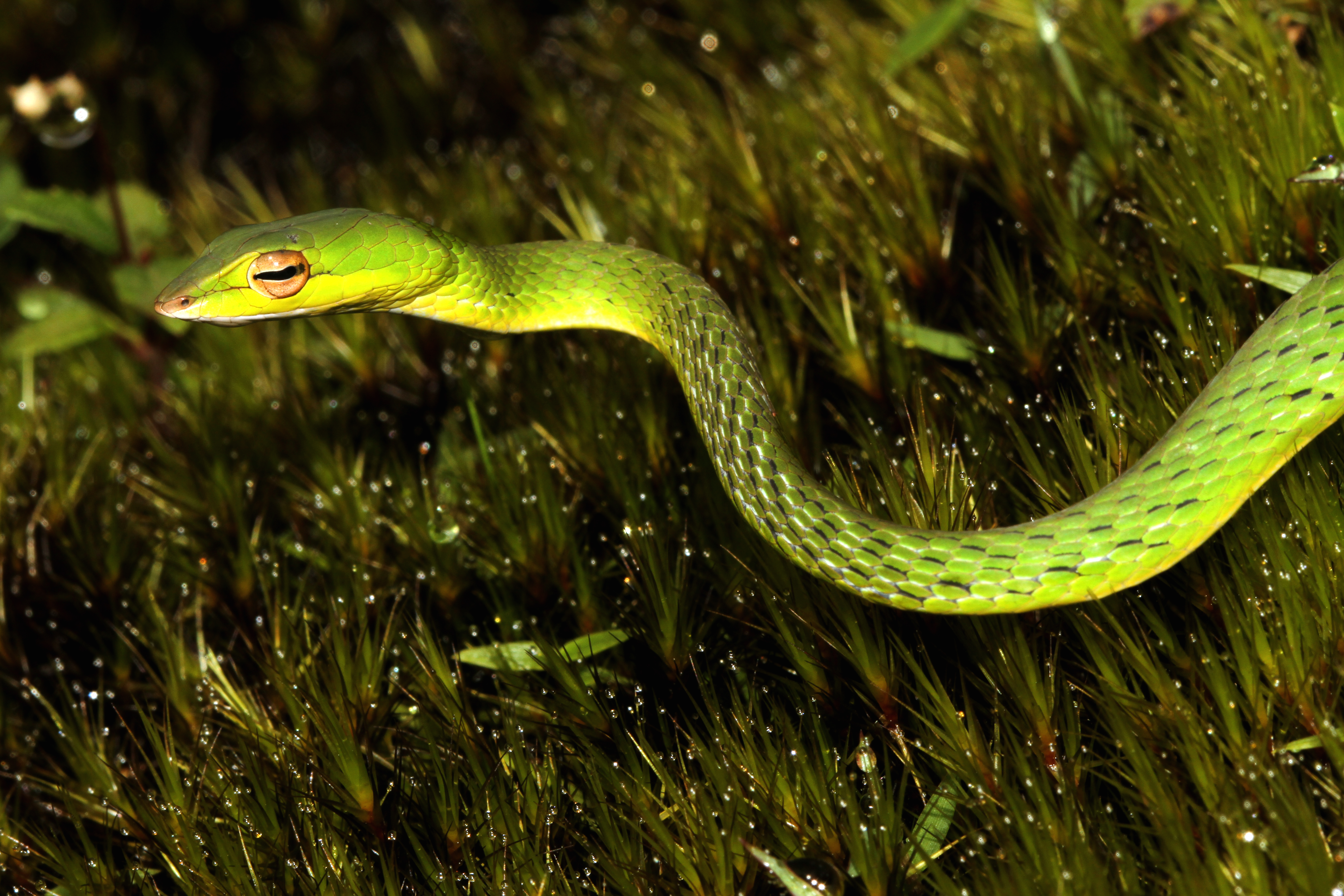
Lateral view

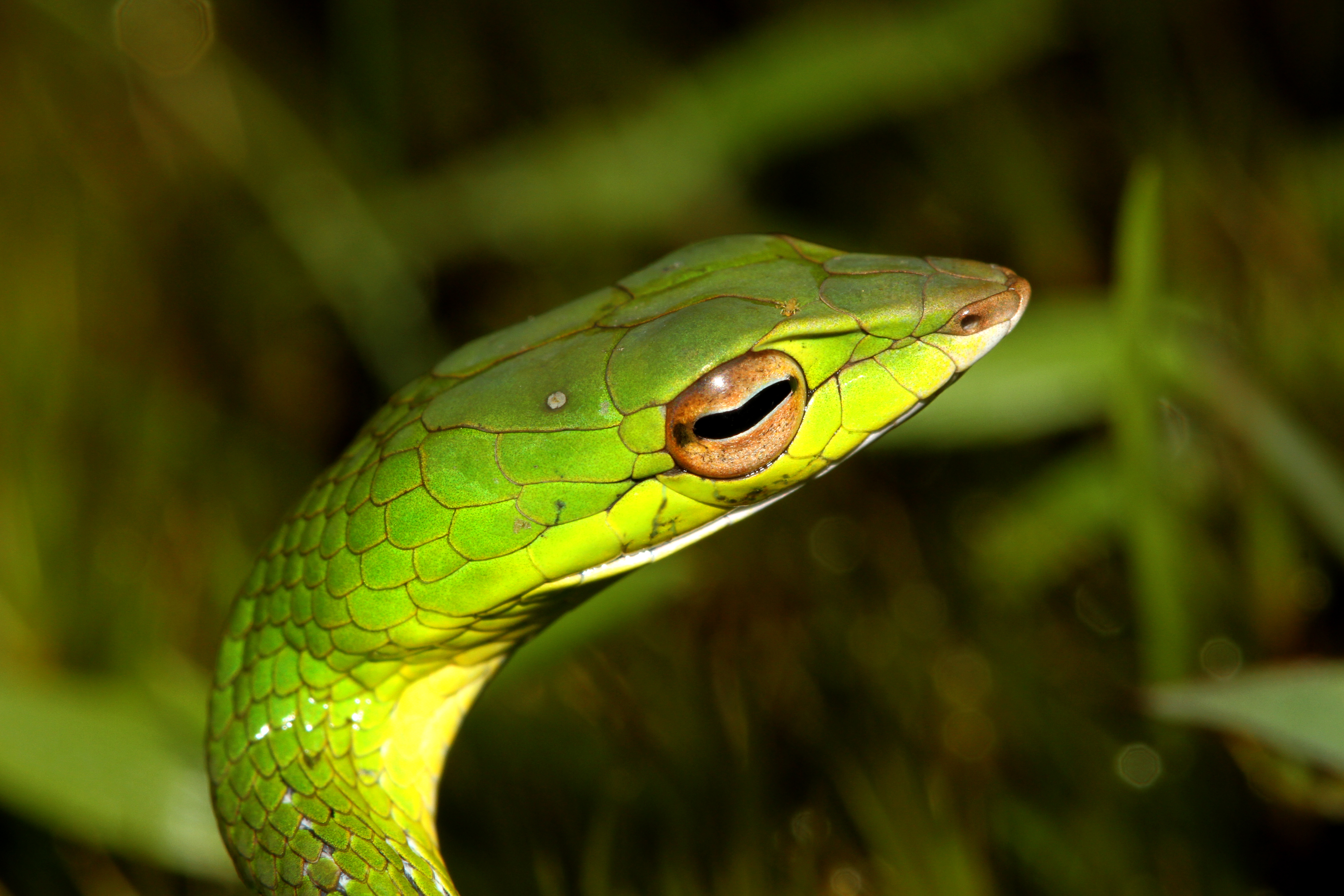
Head

====== Ahaetulla nasuta (green vine snake / പച്ചിലപാമ്പ്‌) ======
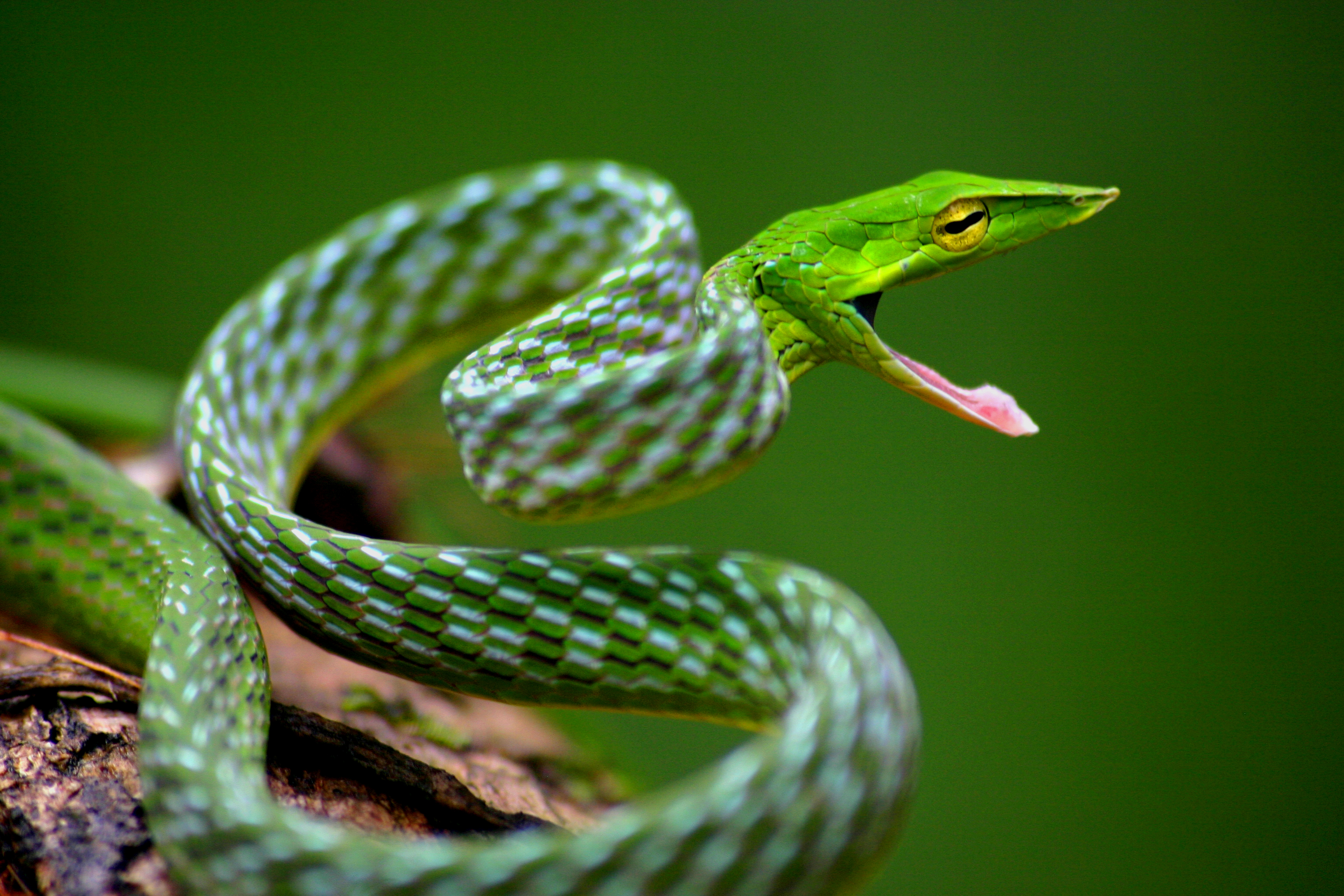
Lateral view

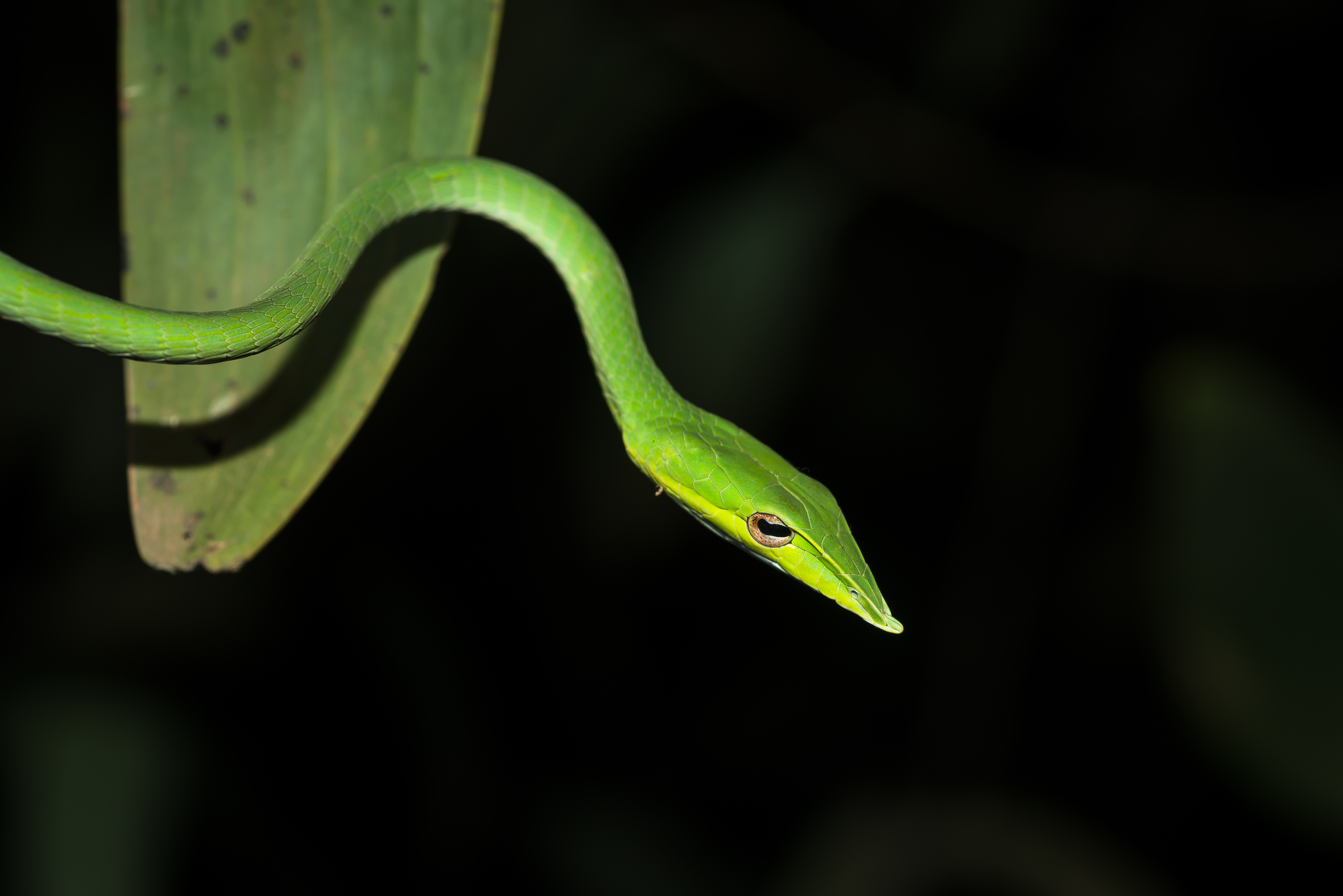
Lateral view

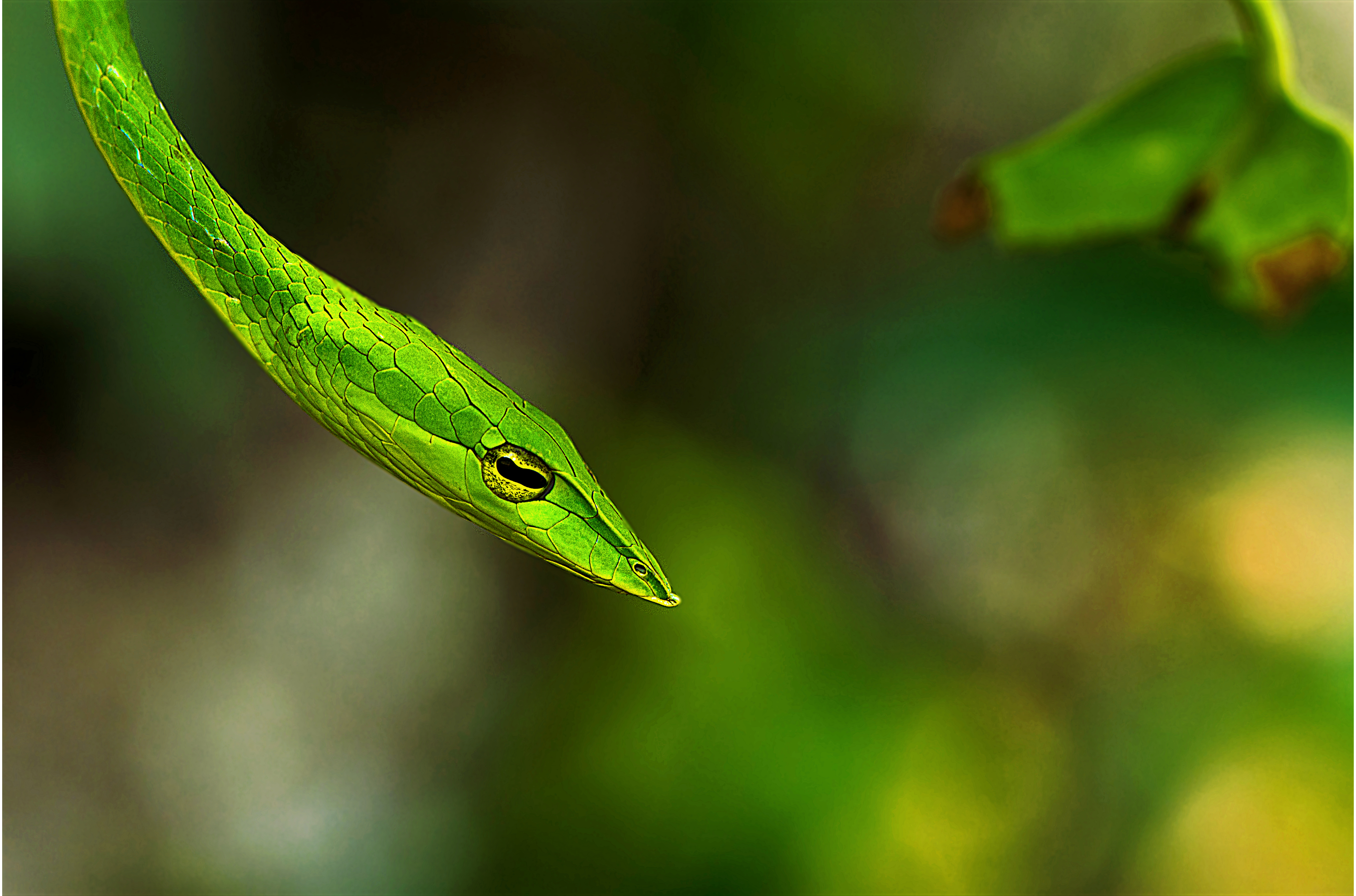
Head

====== Ahaetulla perroteti (Western Ghats bronzeback / ചോലപ്പച്ചോലൻ‍) ======
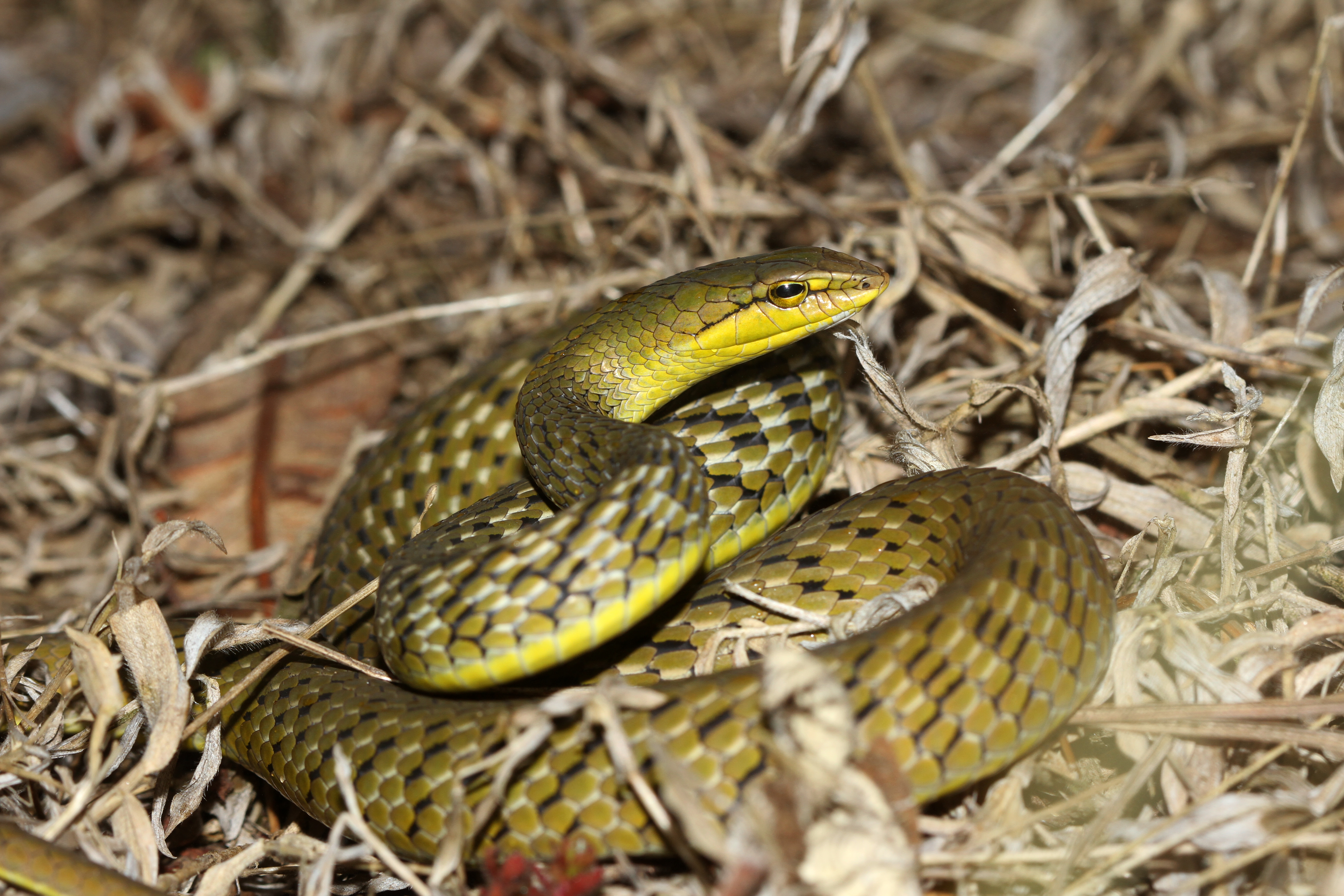
Lateral view

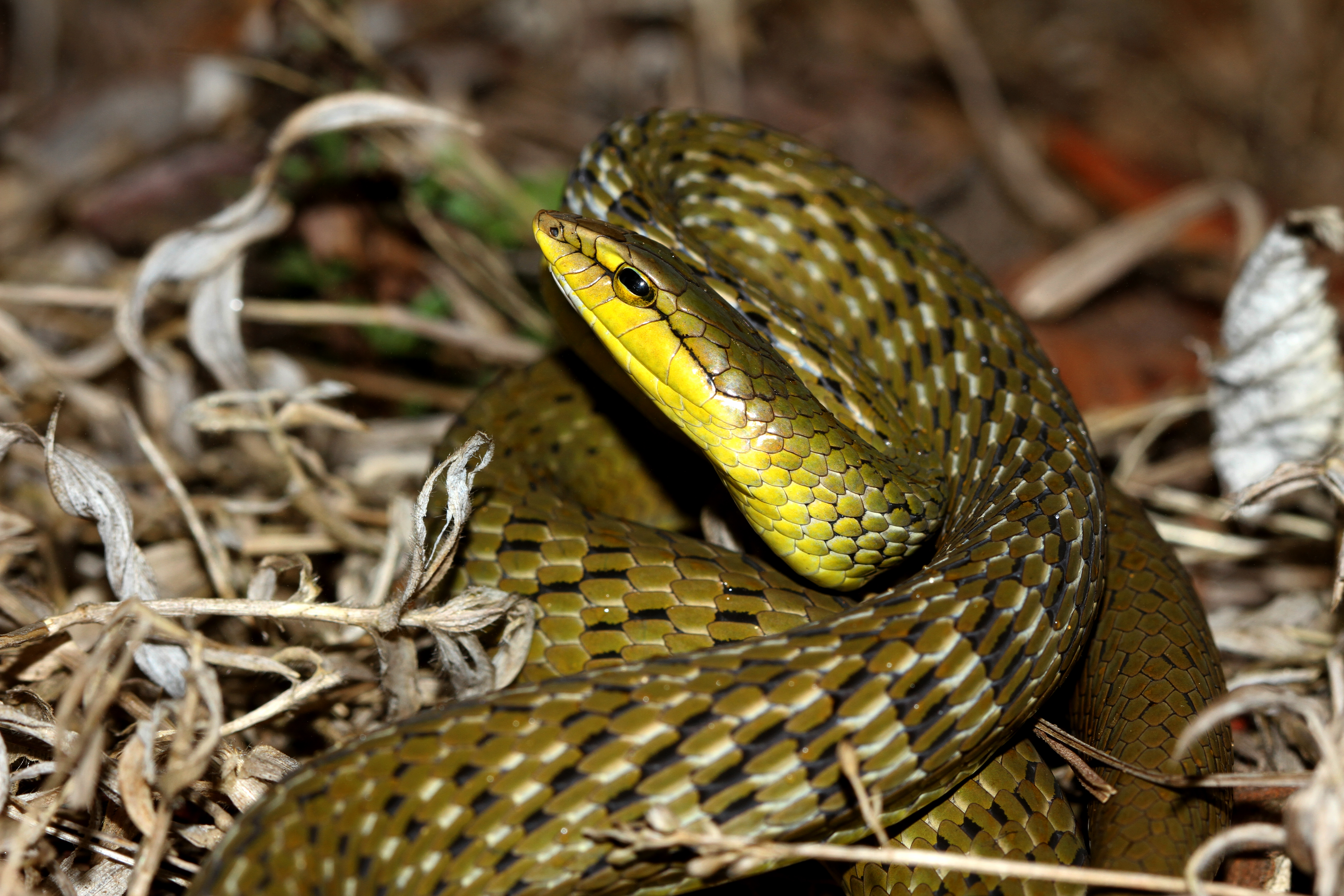
Lateral view

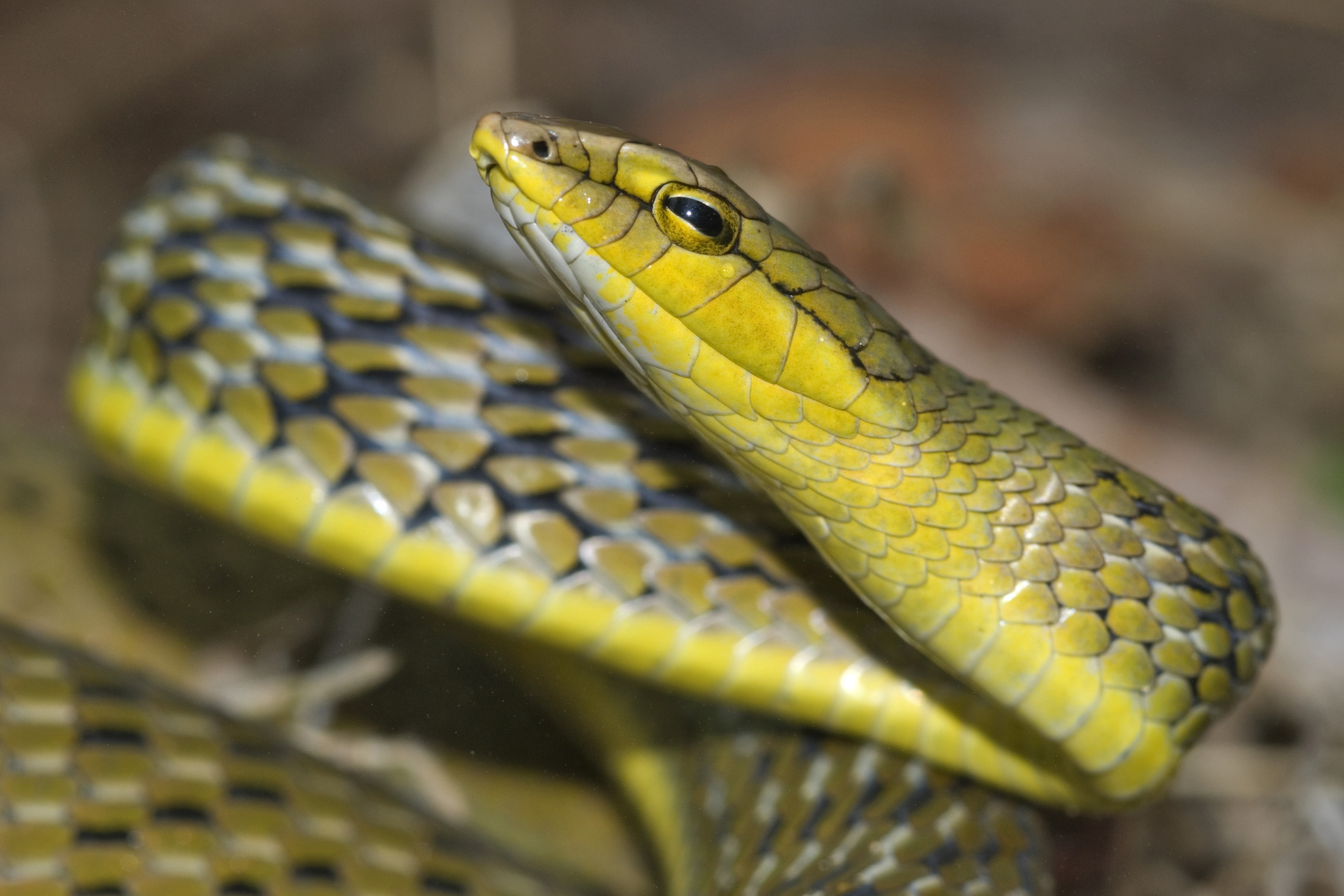
Head

====== Ahaetulla pulverulenta (brown vine snake / തവിട്ടോലപ്പാമ്പ്) ======
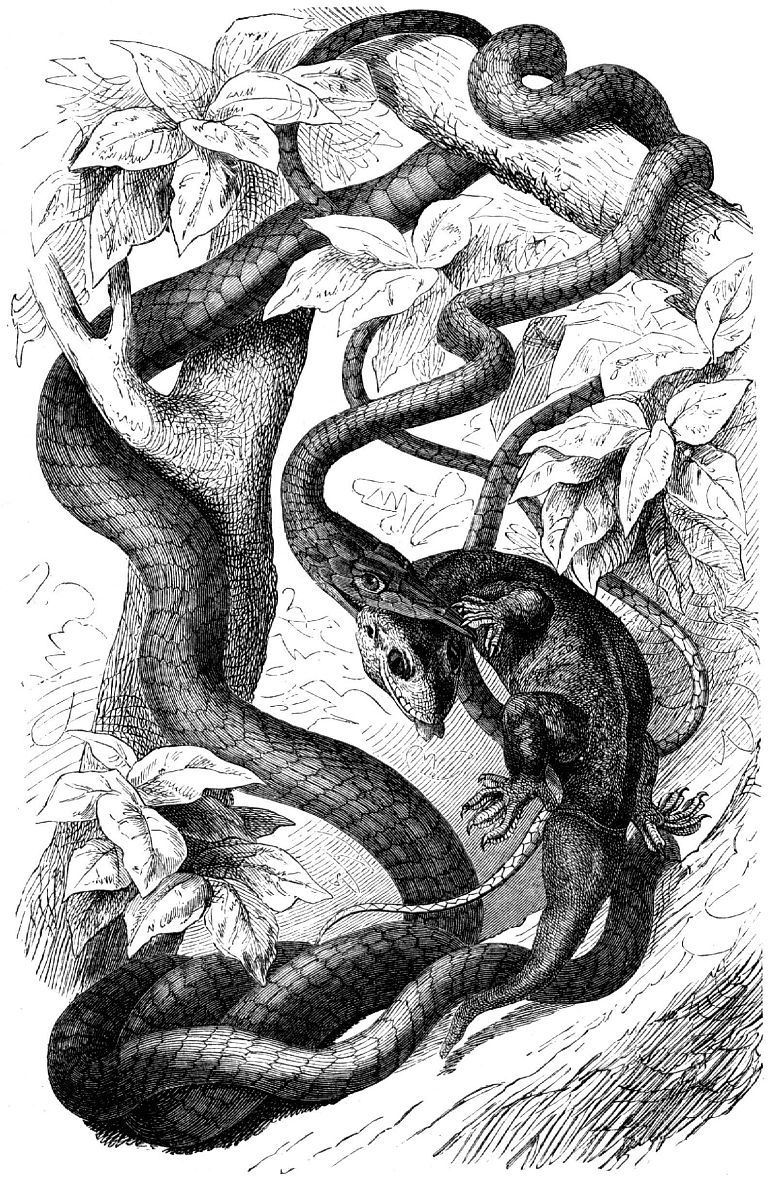
Illustration

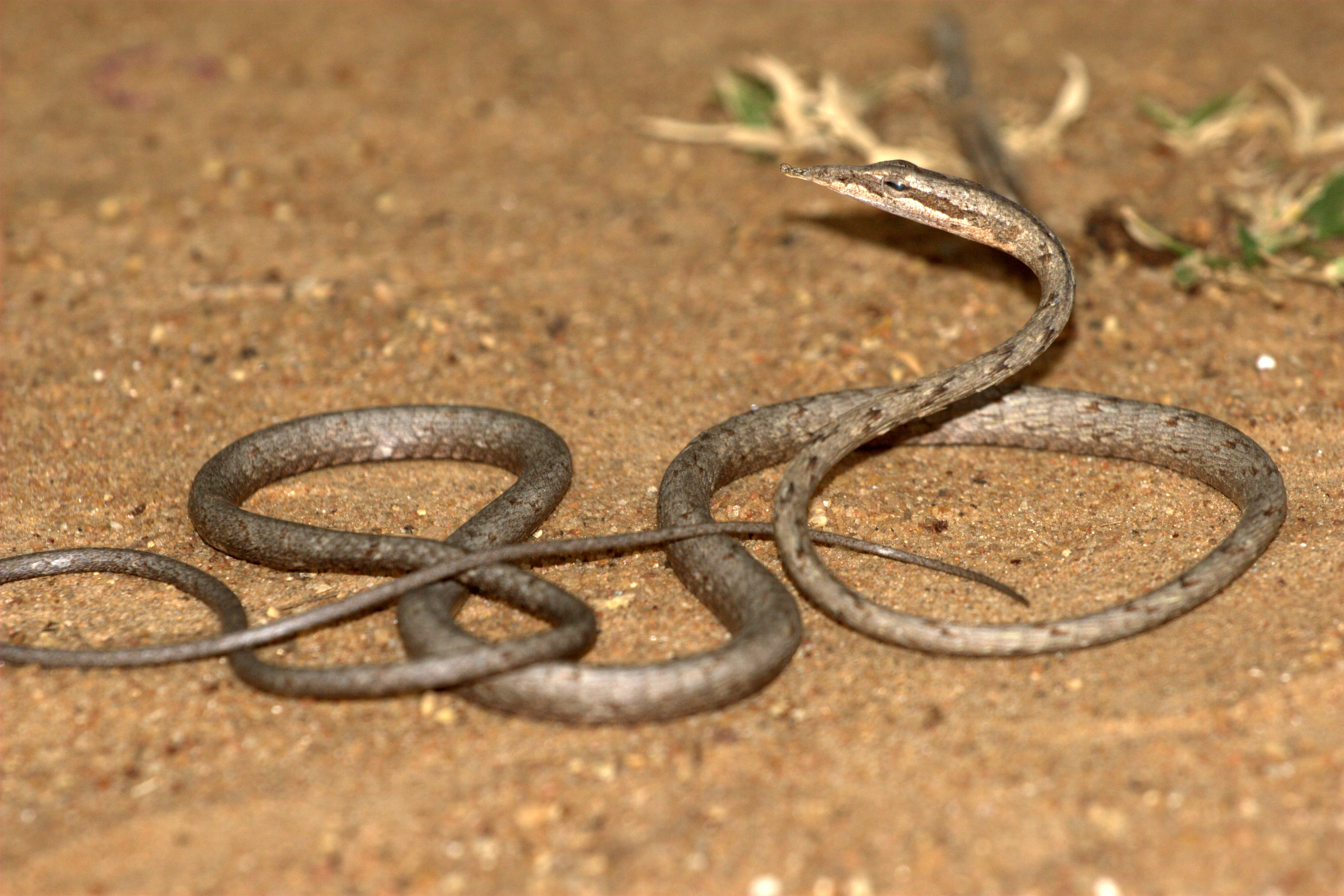
Lateral view

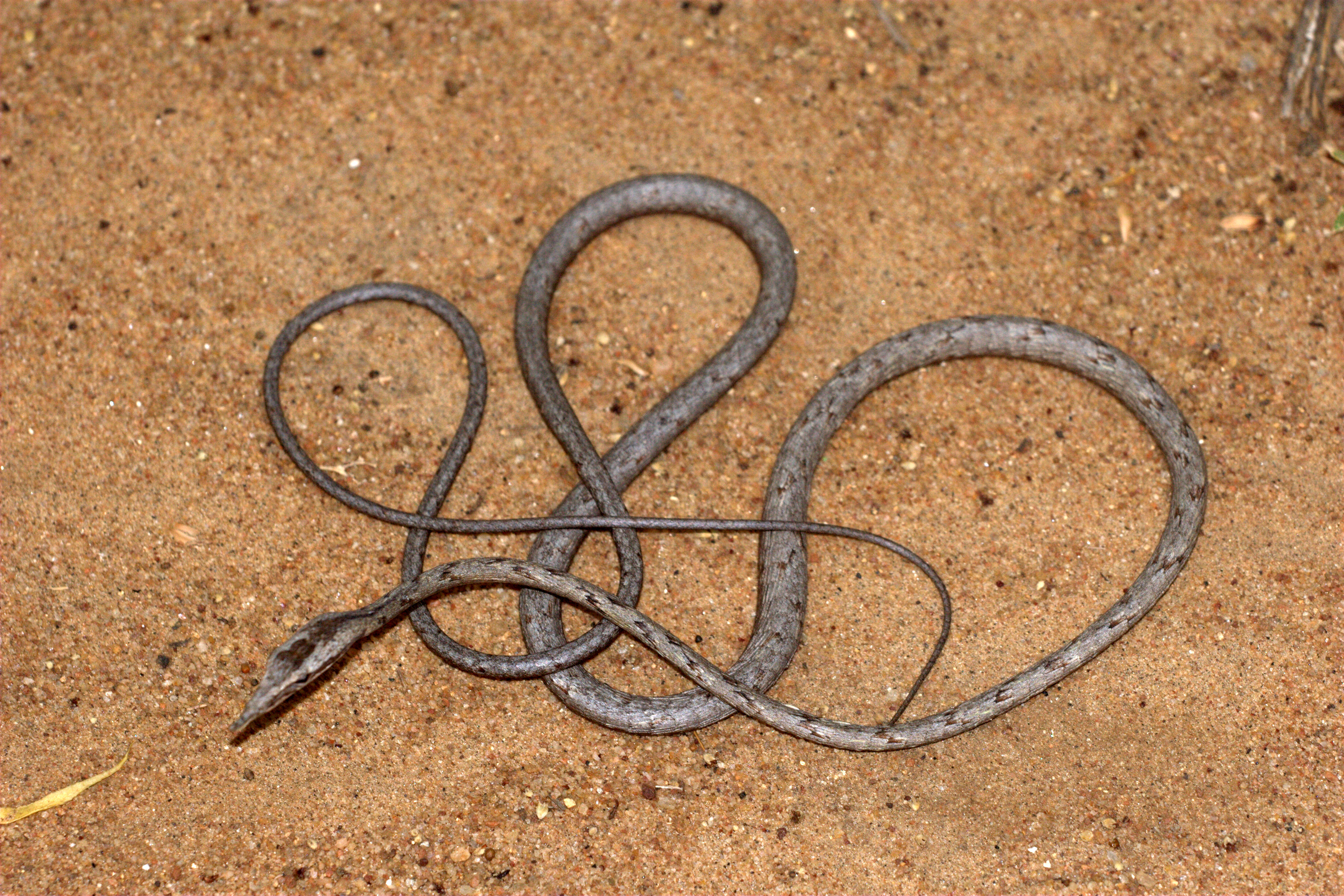
Lateral view

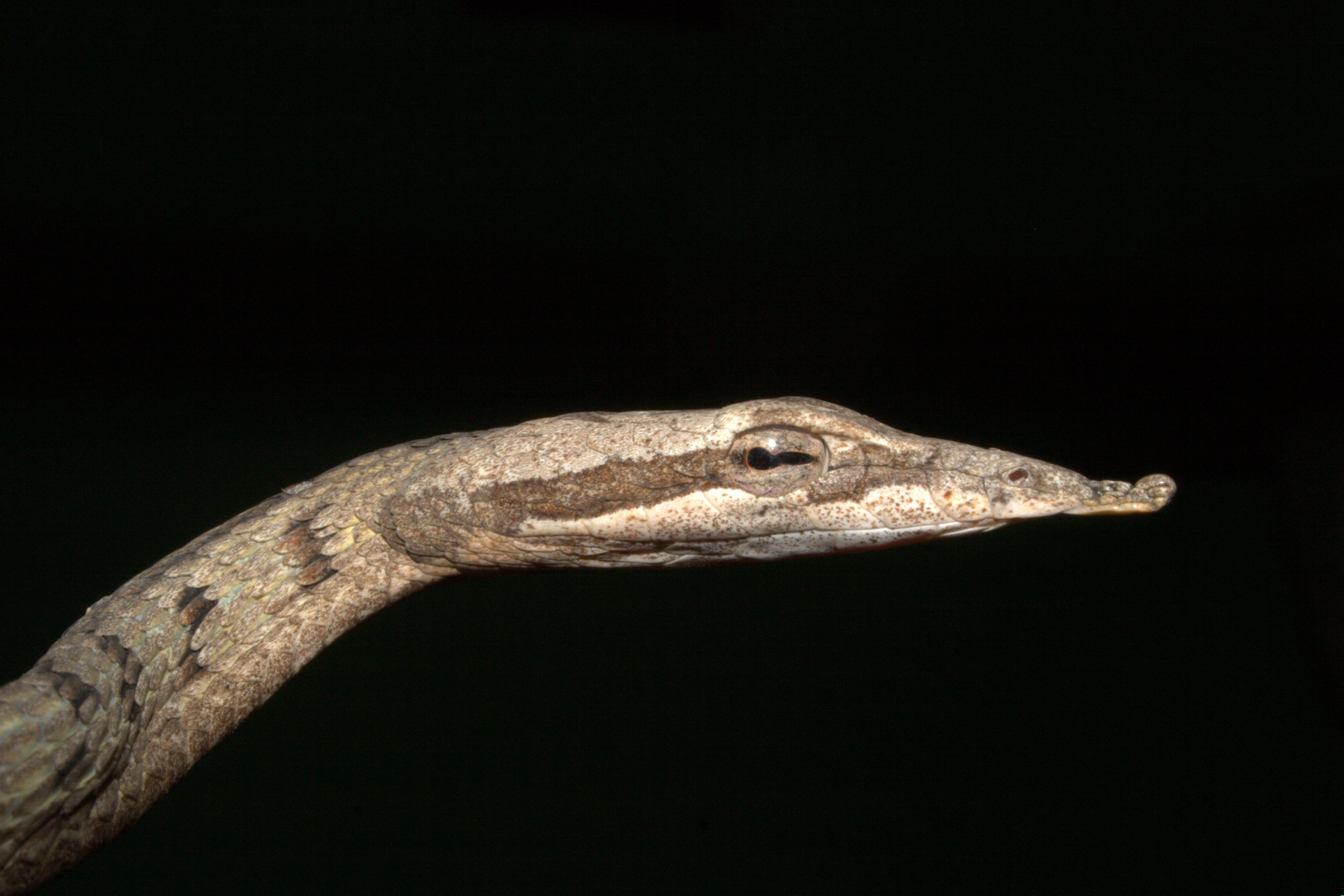
Head

===== Genus: Argyrogena =====
====== Argyrogena fasciolata (banded racer / വള്ളിച്ചേര) ======
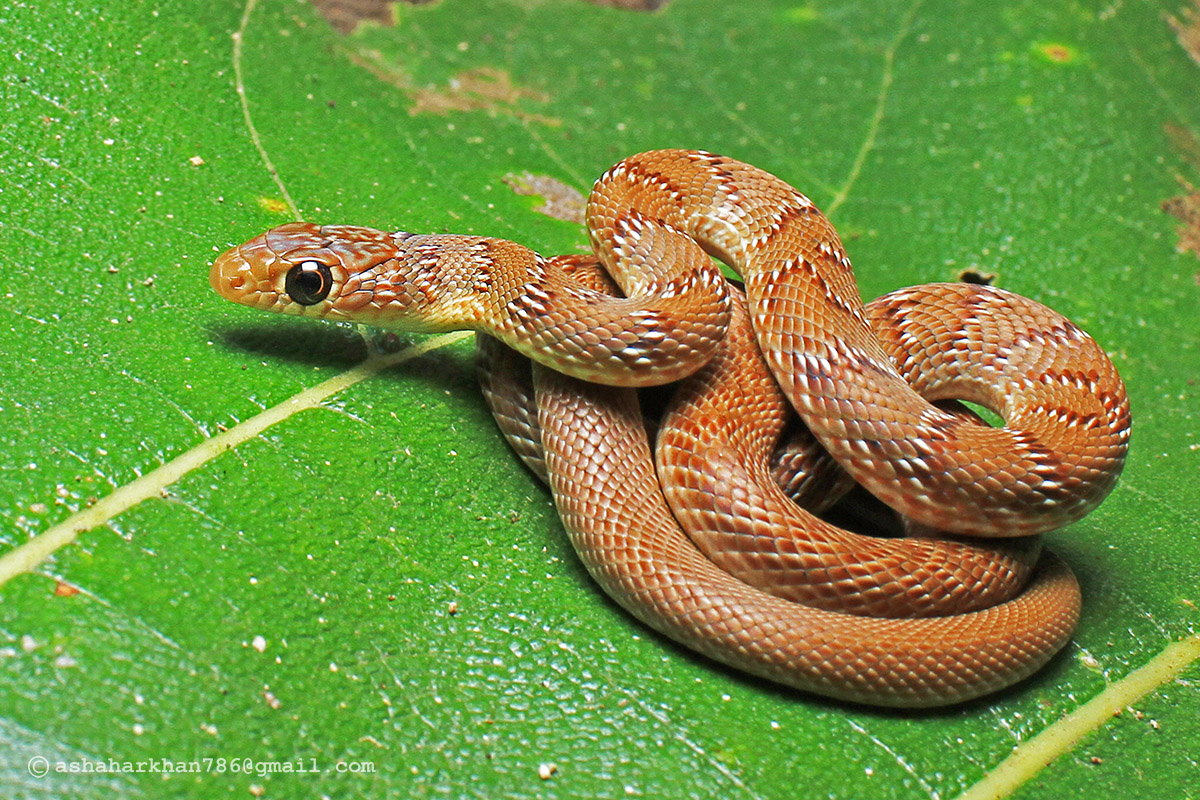
Dorsal view

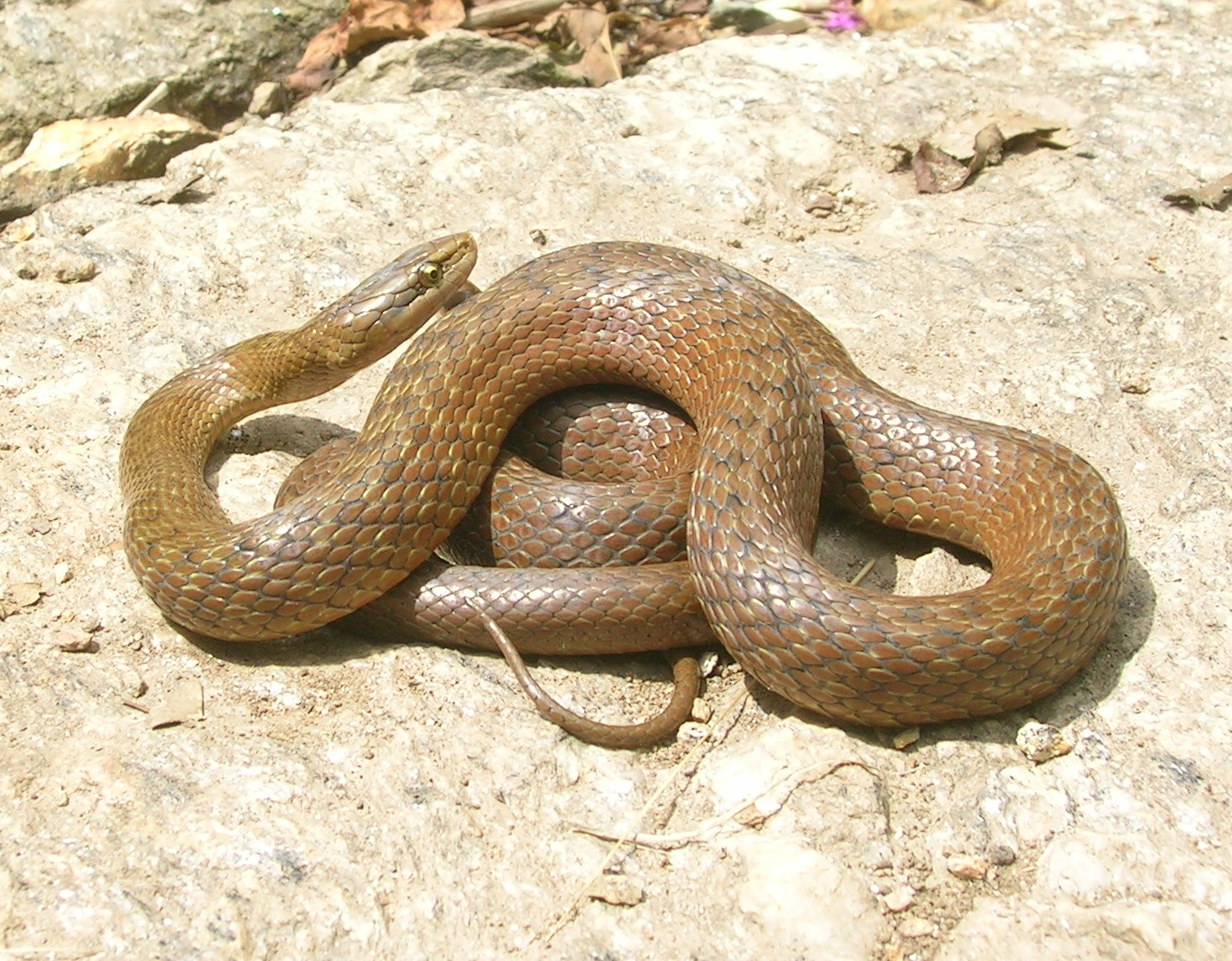
Lateral view

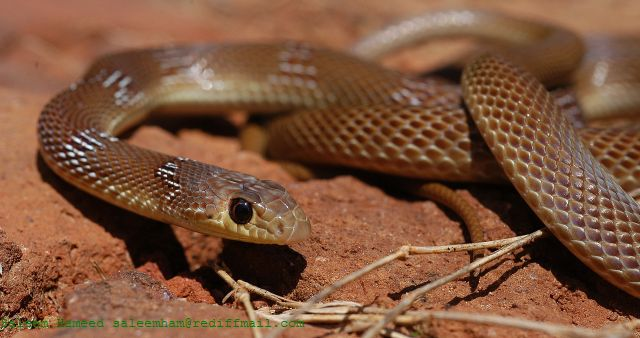
Head

===== Genus: Boiga =====
====== Boiga beddomei (Beddome's cat snake) ======
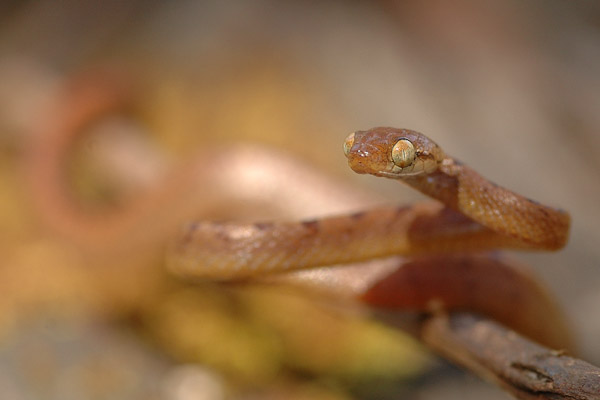
Head

====== Boiga ceylonensis (Sri Lanka cat snake / കാട്ടുവലയൻ പാമ്പ്) ======
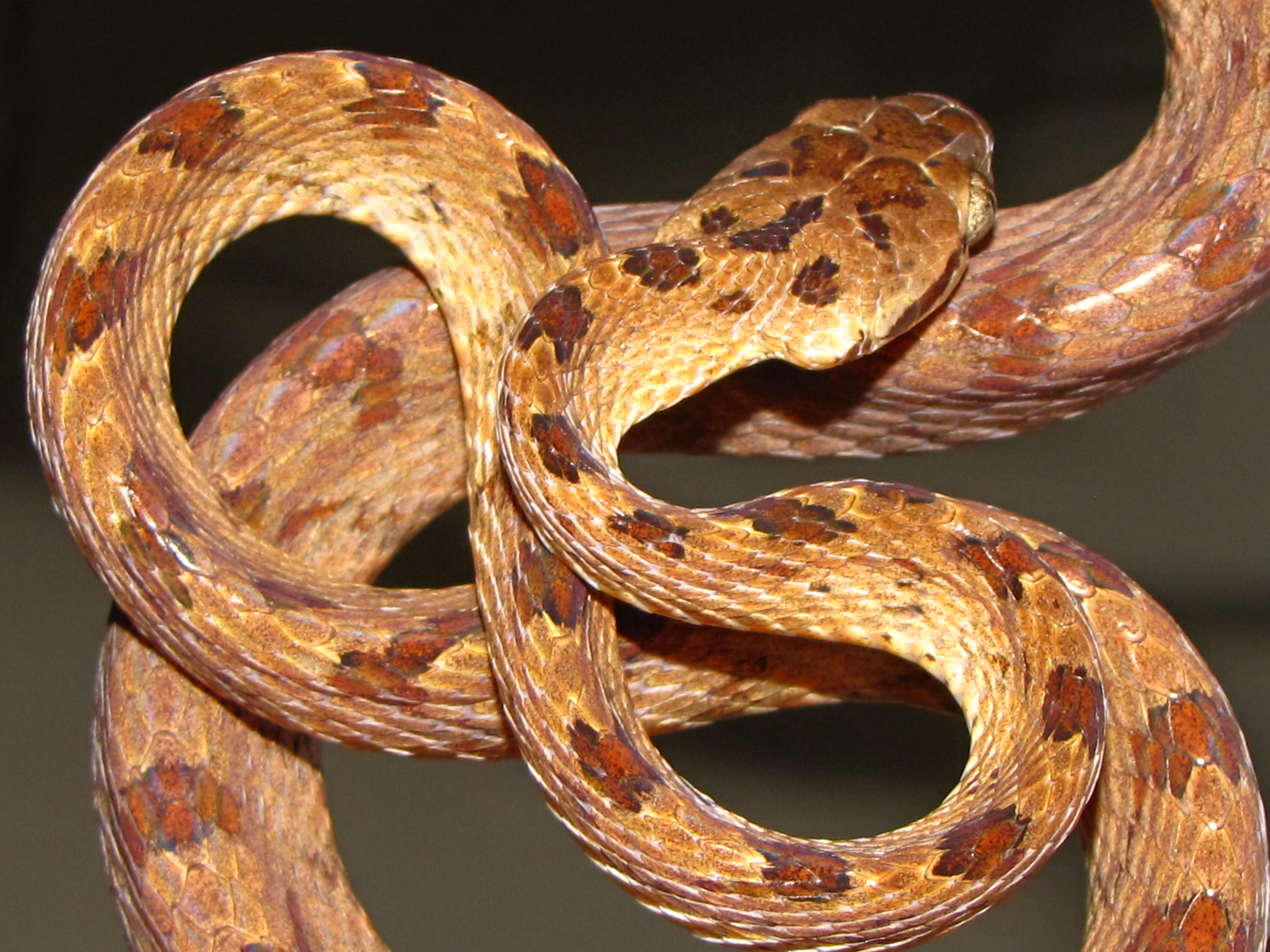
Dorsal view

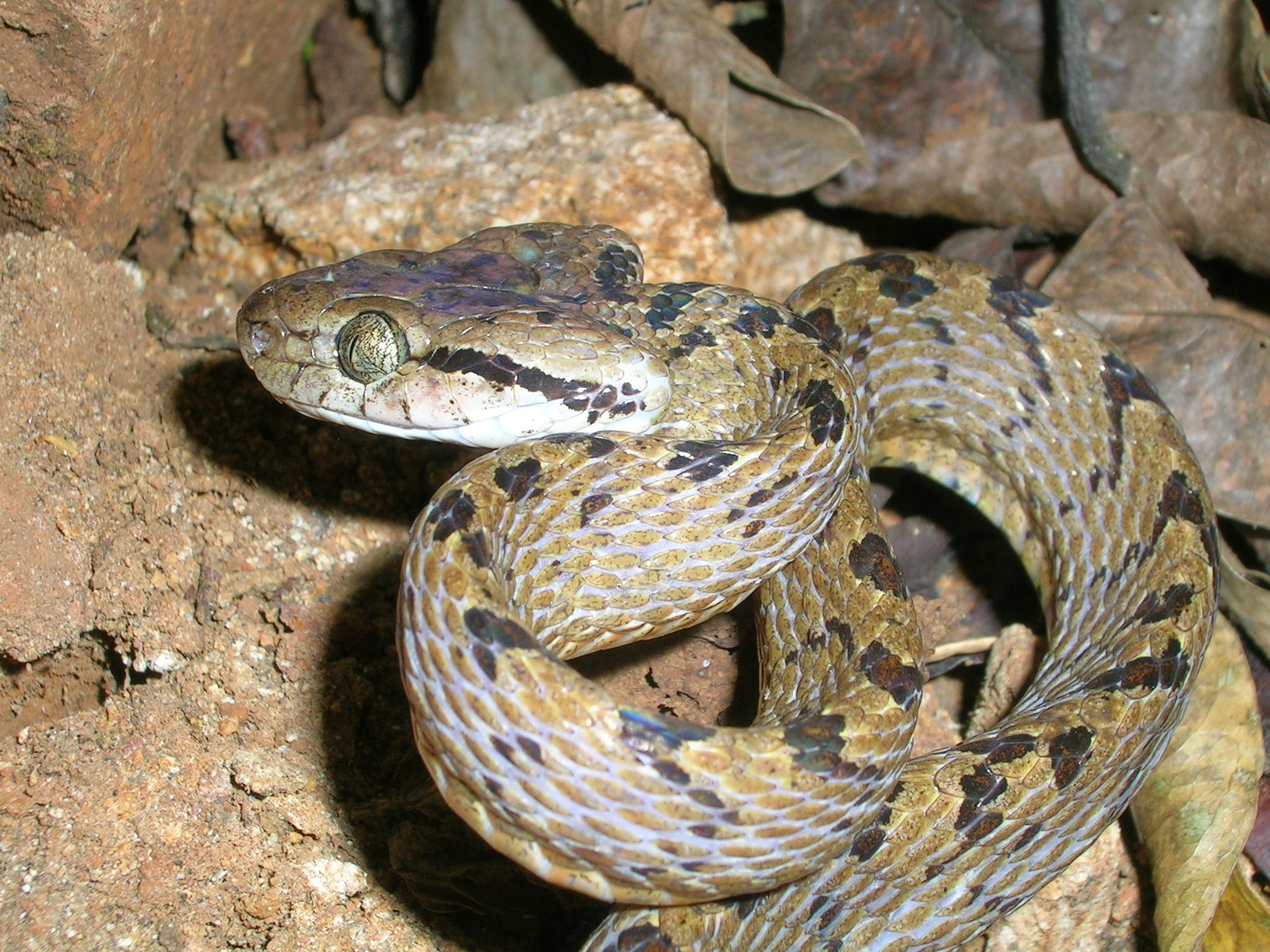
Lateral view

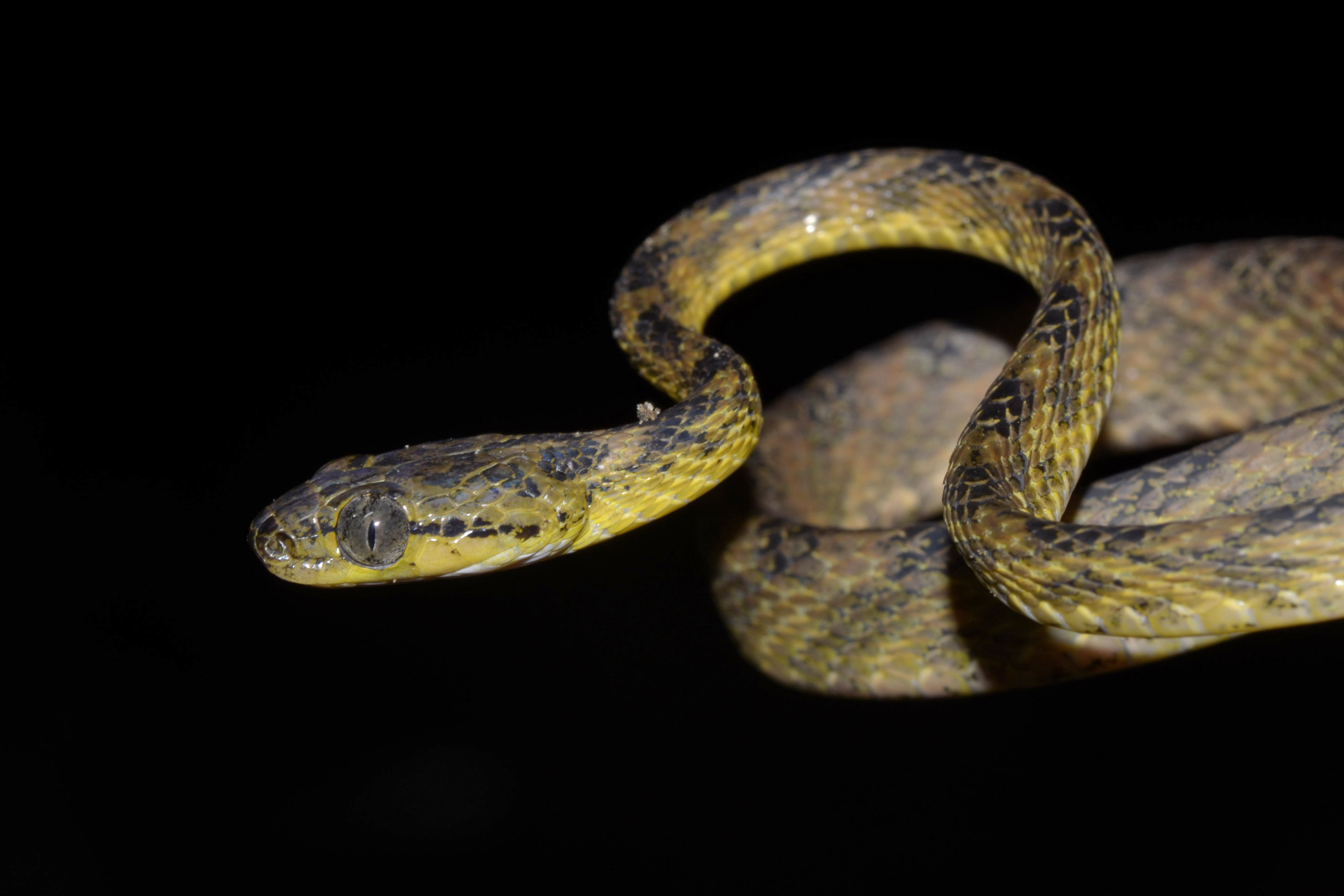
Lateral view

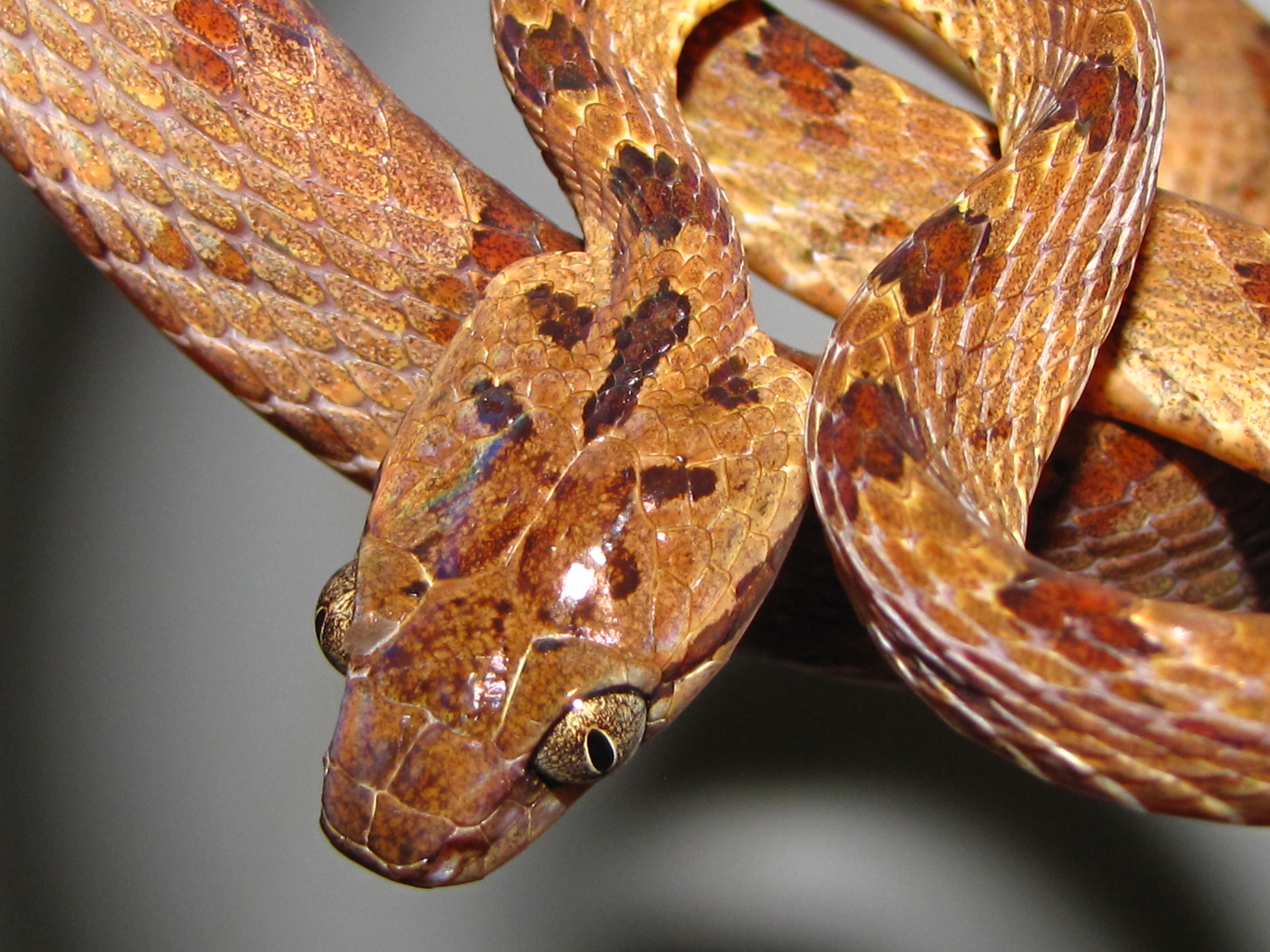
Head

====== Boiga forsteni (Forsten's cat snake / കരികുരിയൻ പാമ്പ്) ======
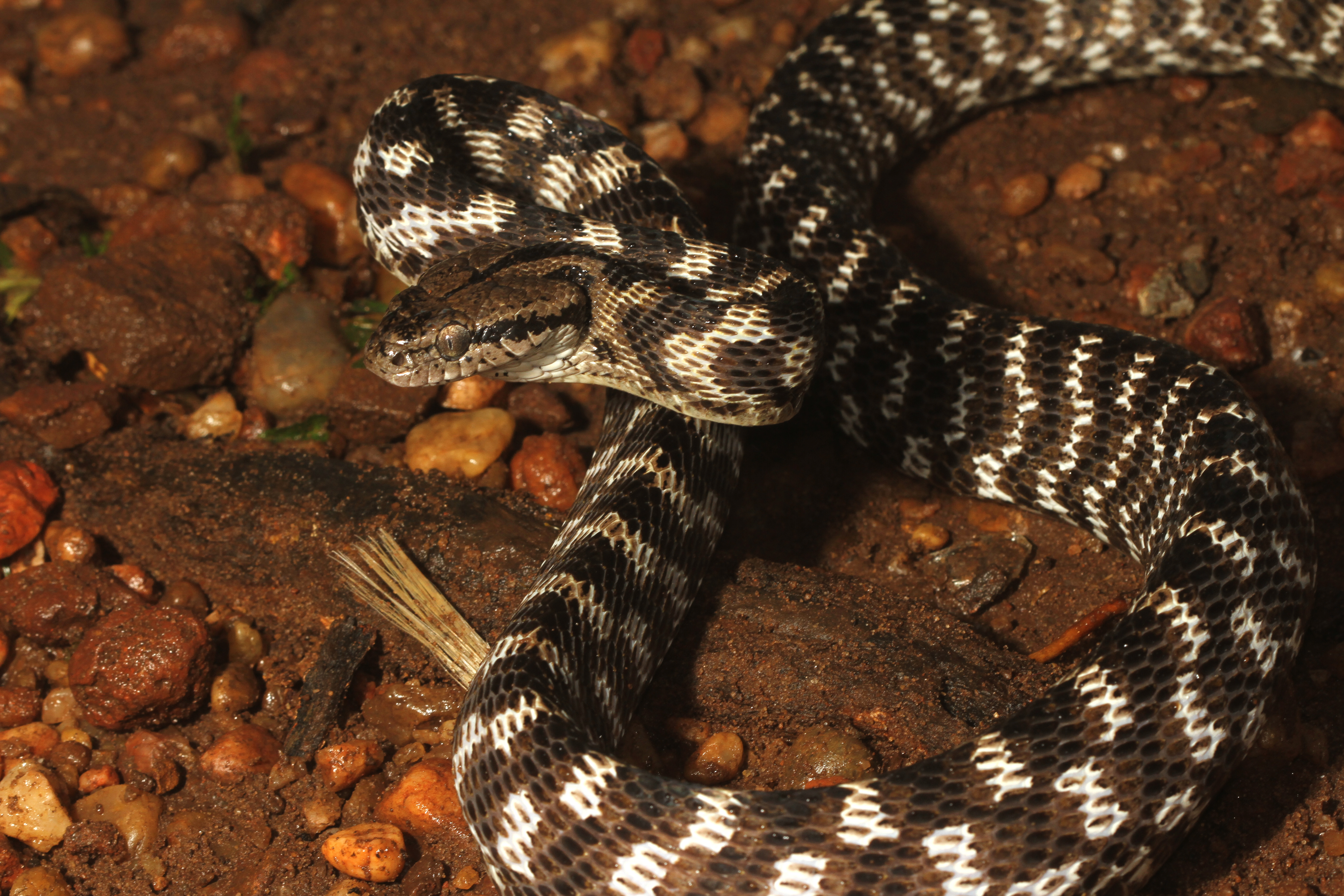
Lateral view

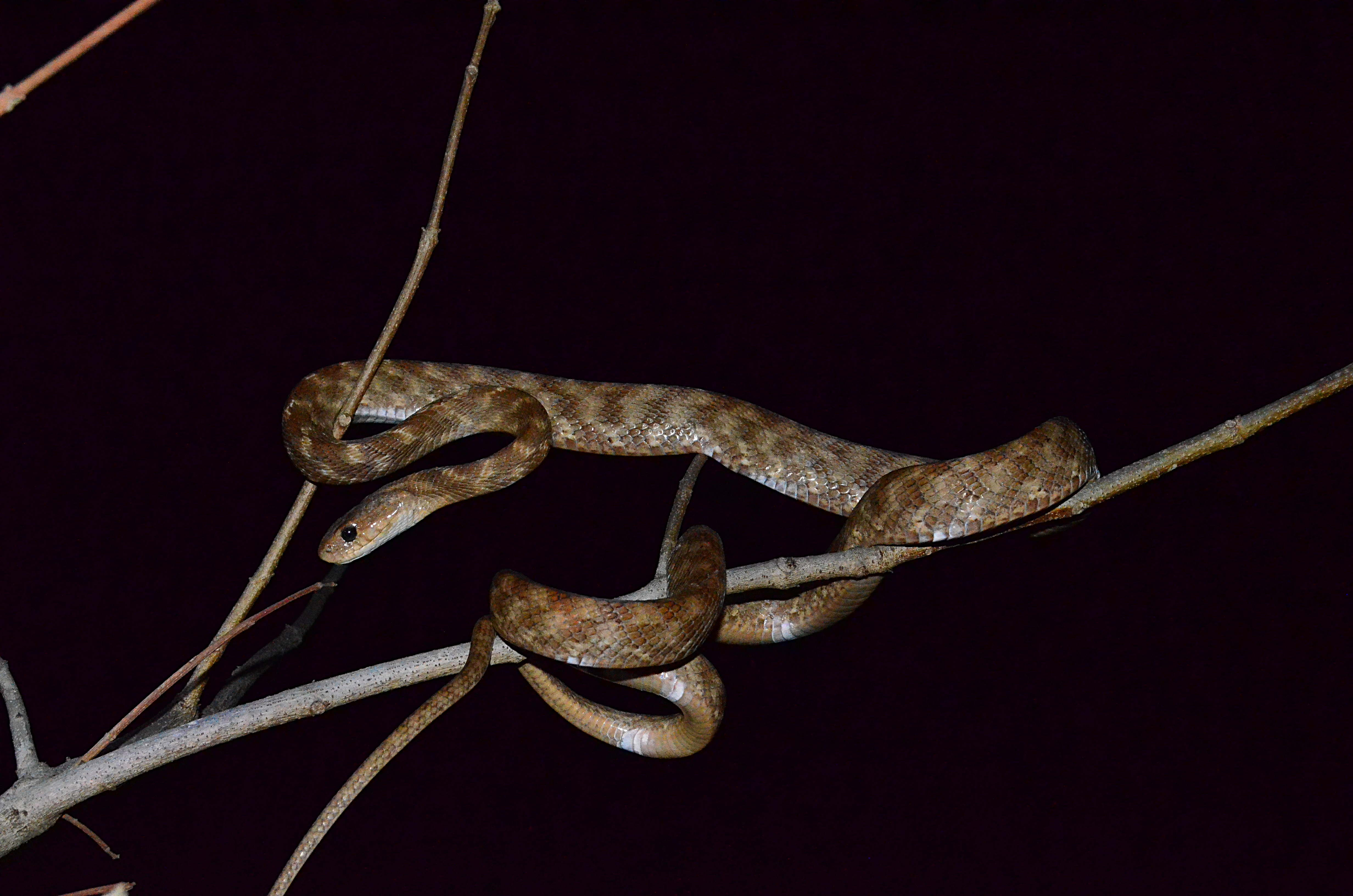
Lateral view

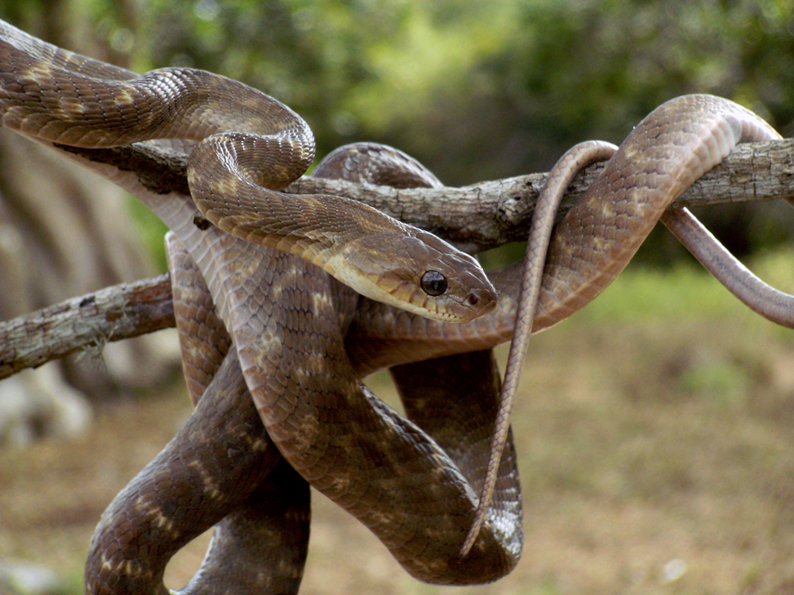
Lateral view

====== Boiga nuchalis (collared cat snake / വളയൻ പൂച്ചക്കണ്ണിപ്പാമ്പ്) ======
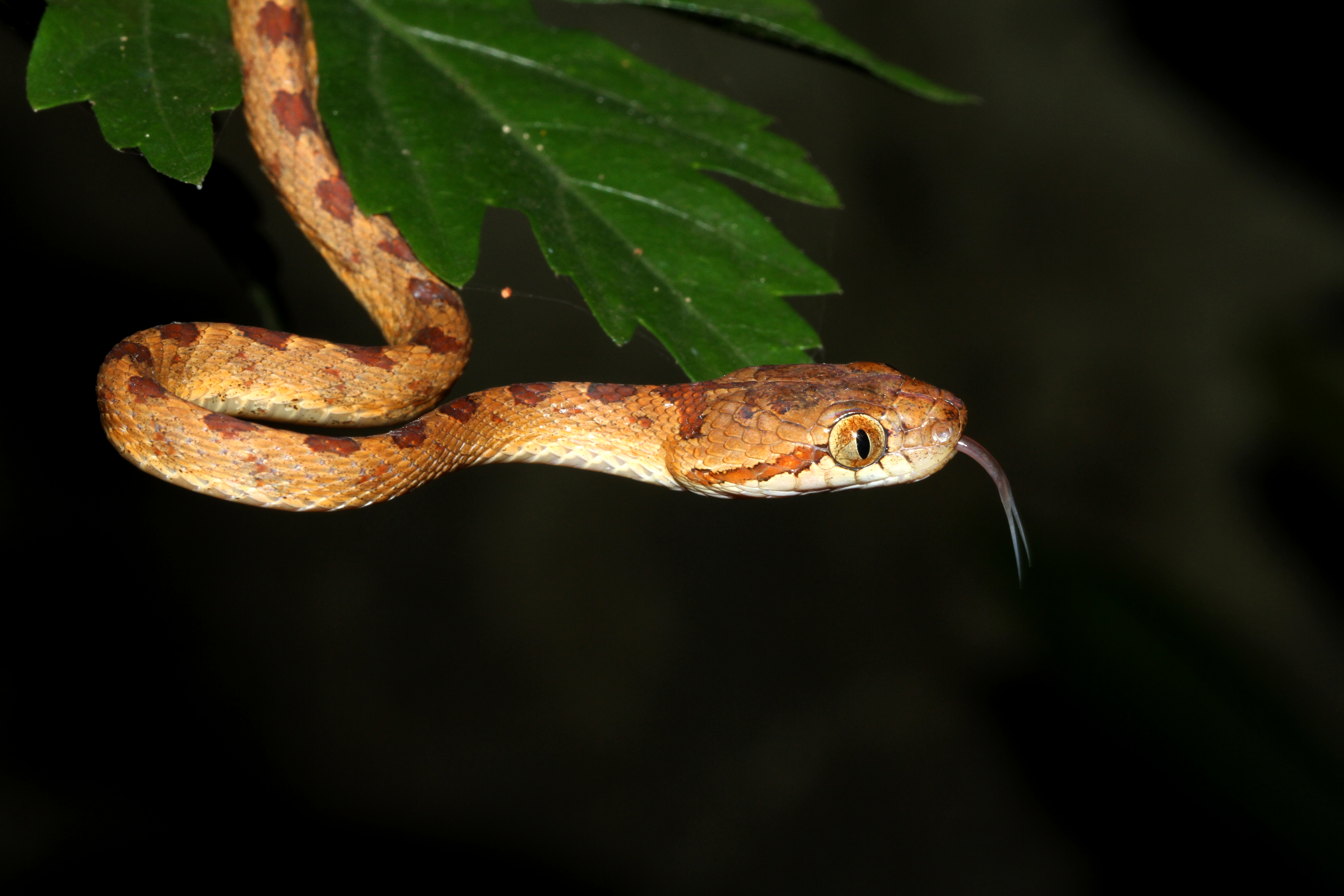
Lateral view

====== Boiga trigonata (common cat snake / പൂച്ചക്കണ്ണൻ) ======
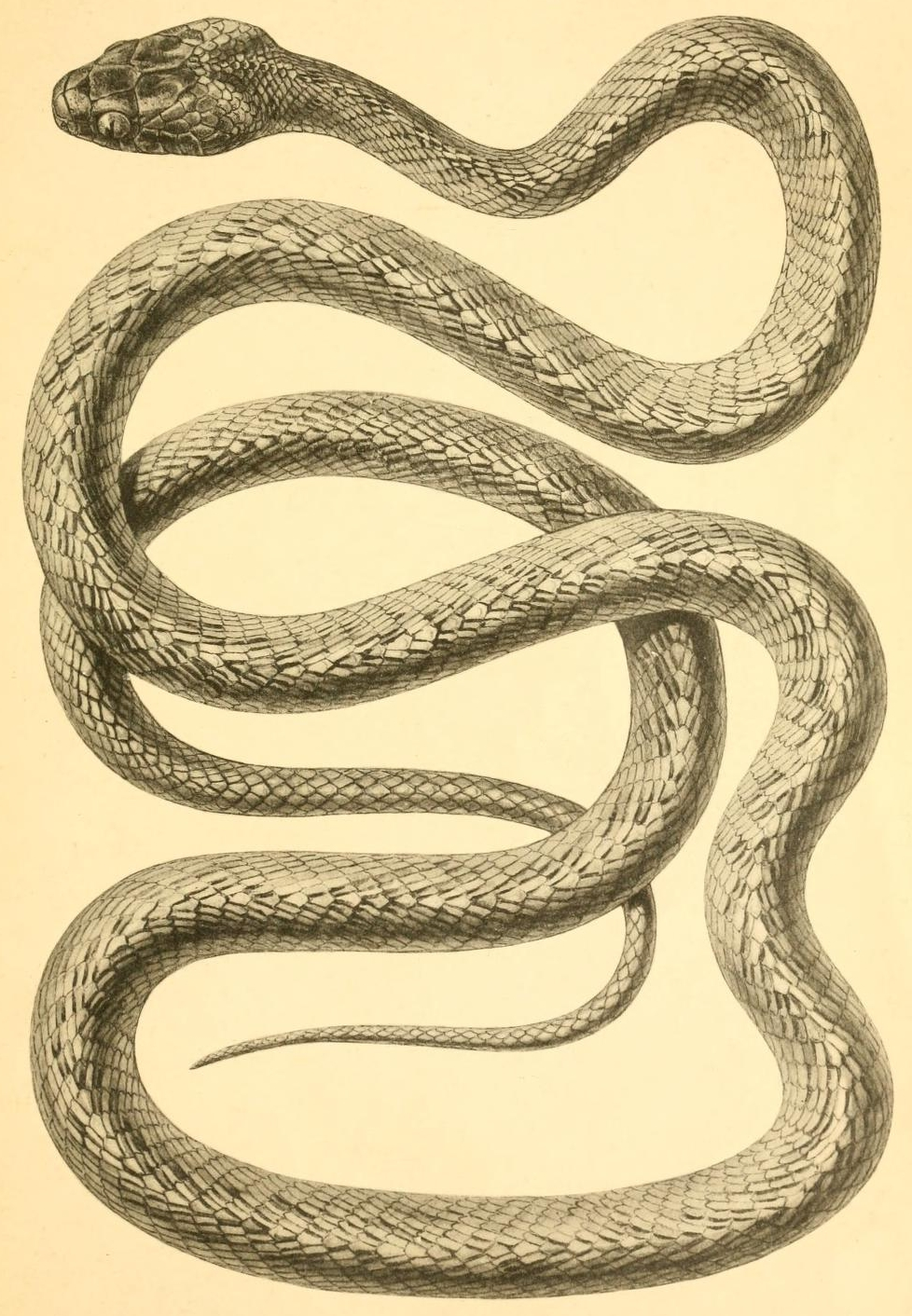
Illustration

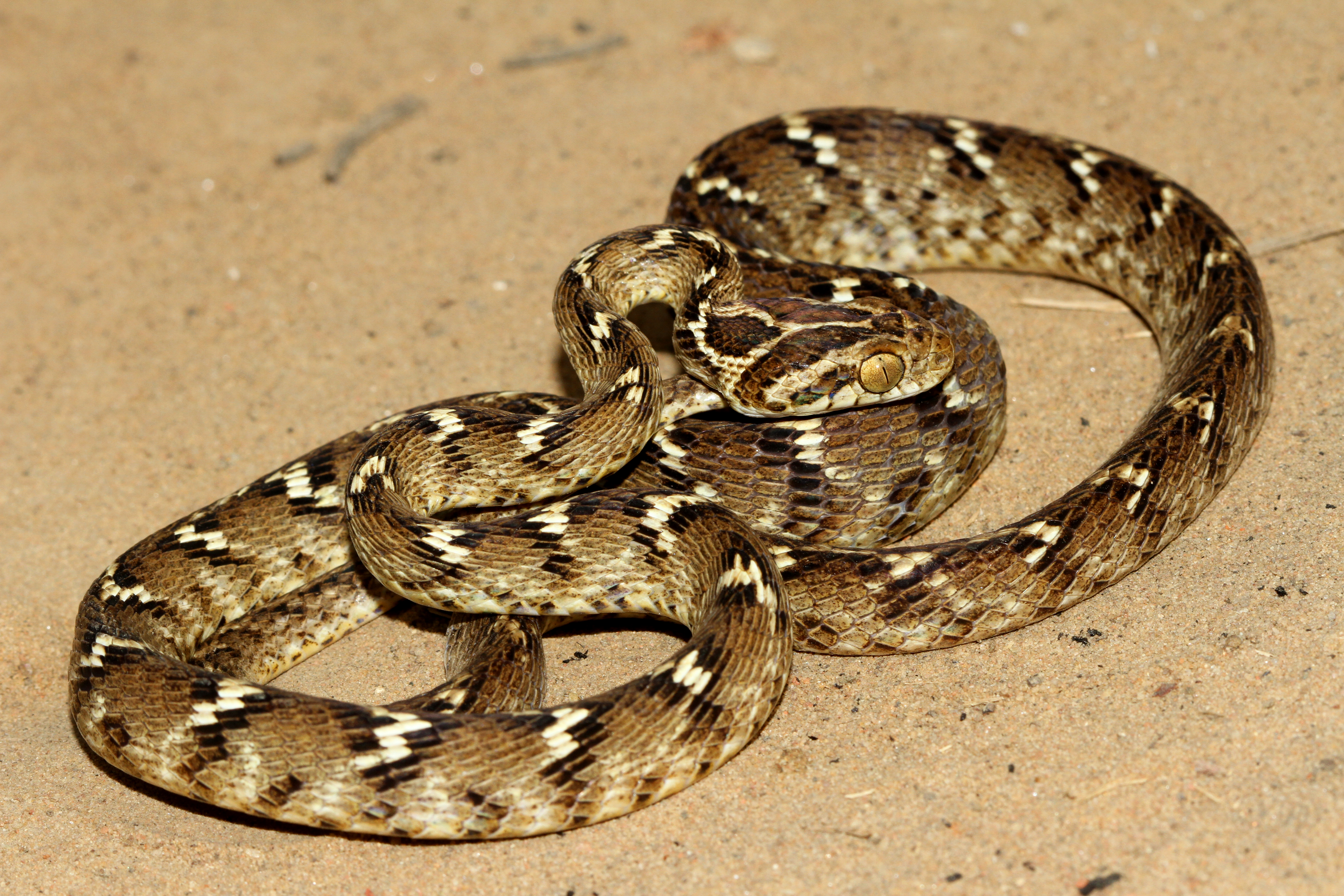
Lateral view

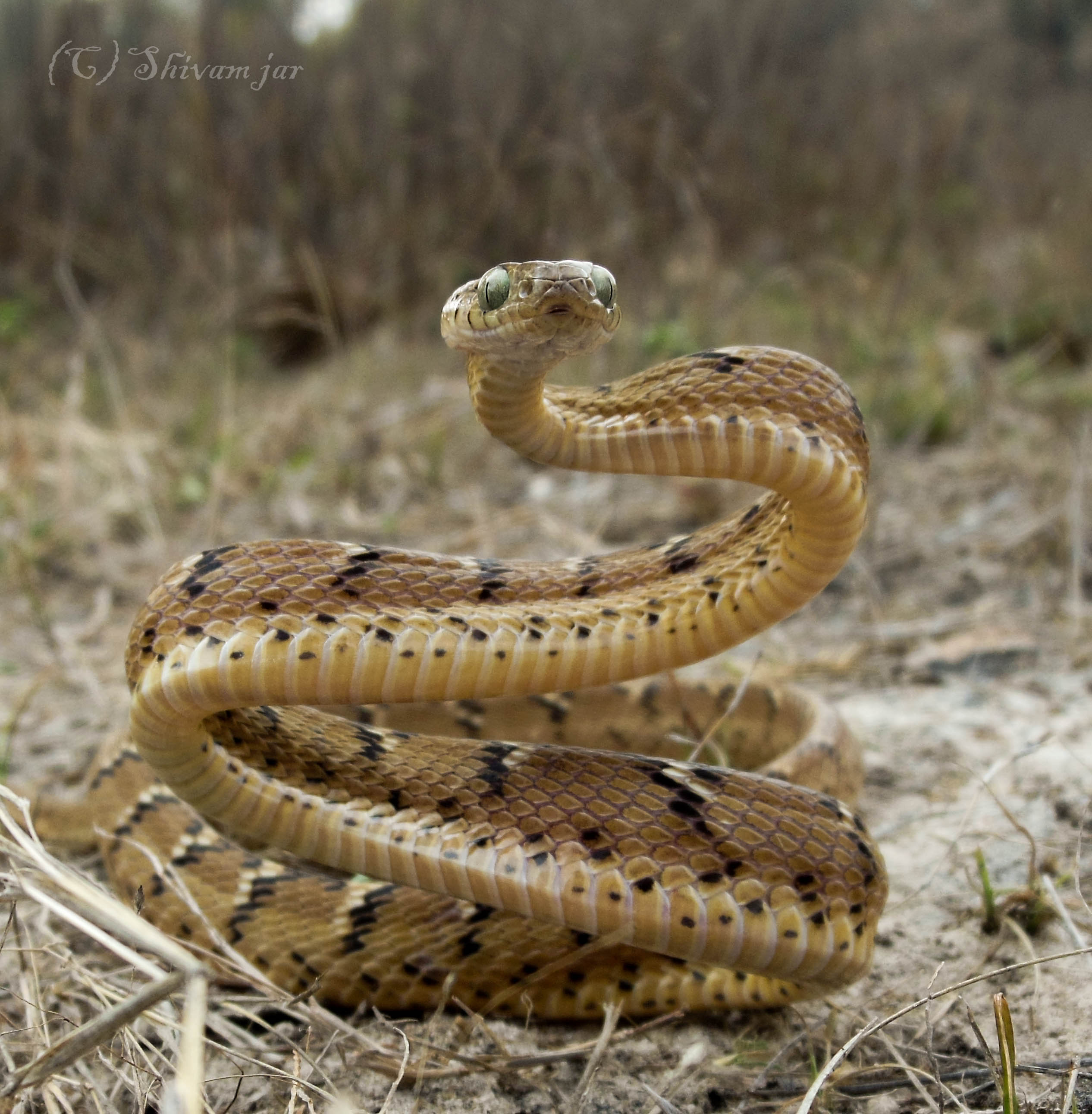
Front view

===== Genus: Chrysopelea =====
====== Chrysopelea ornata (golden tree snake / നാഗത്താൻപാമ്പ്) ======
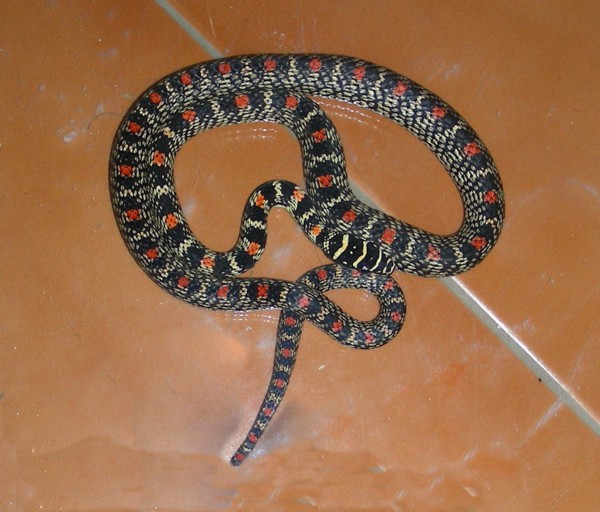
Dorsal view

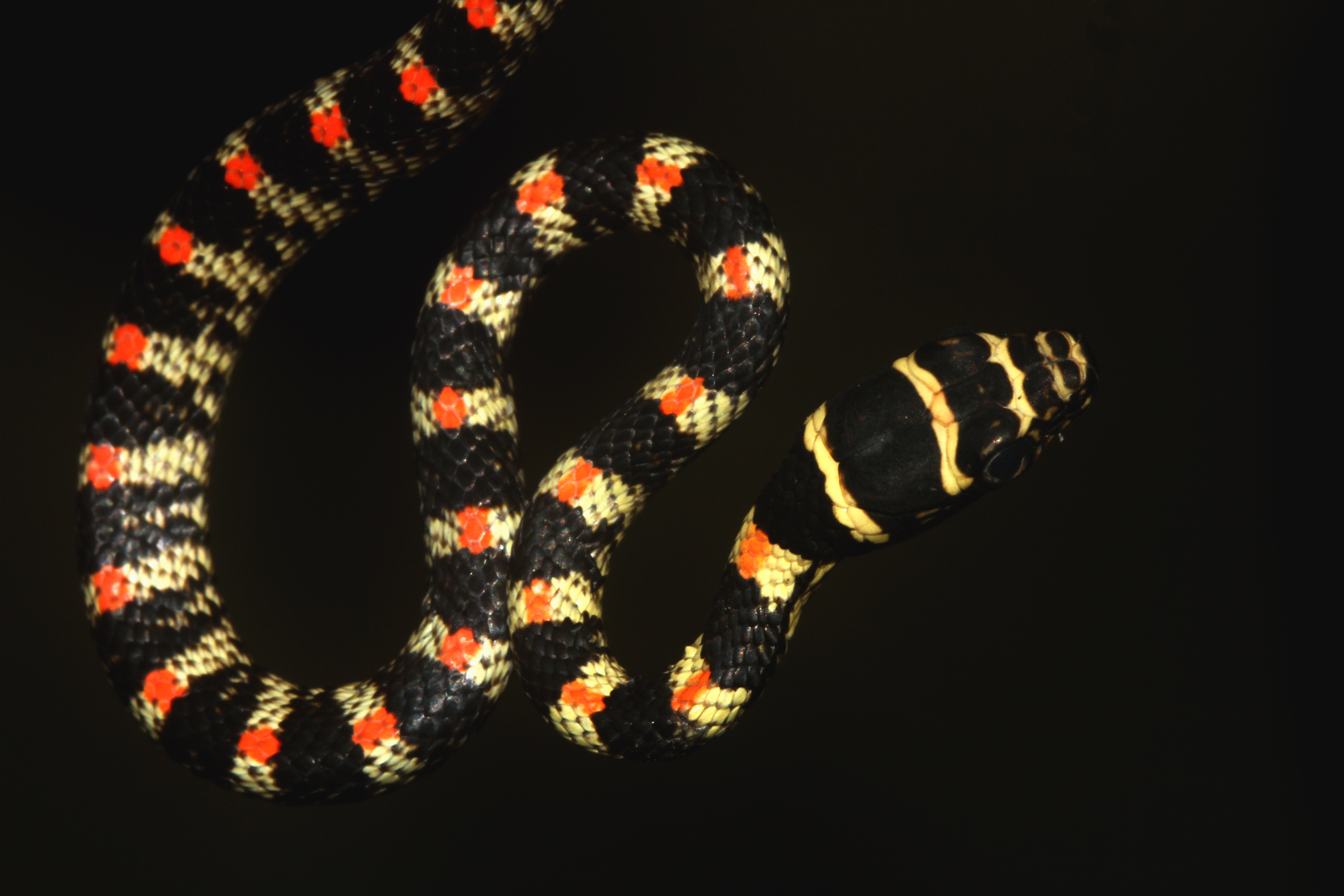
Dorsal view

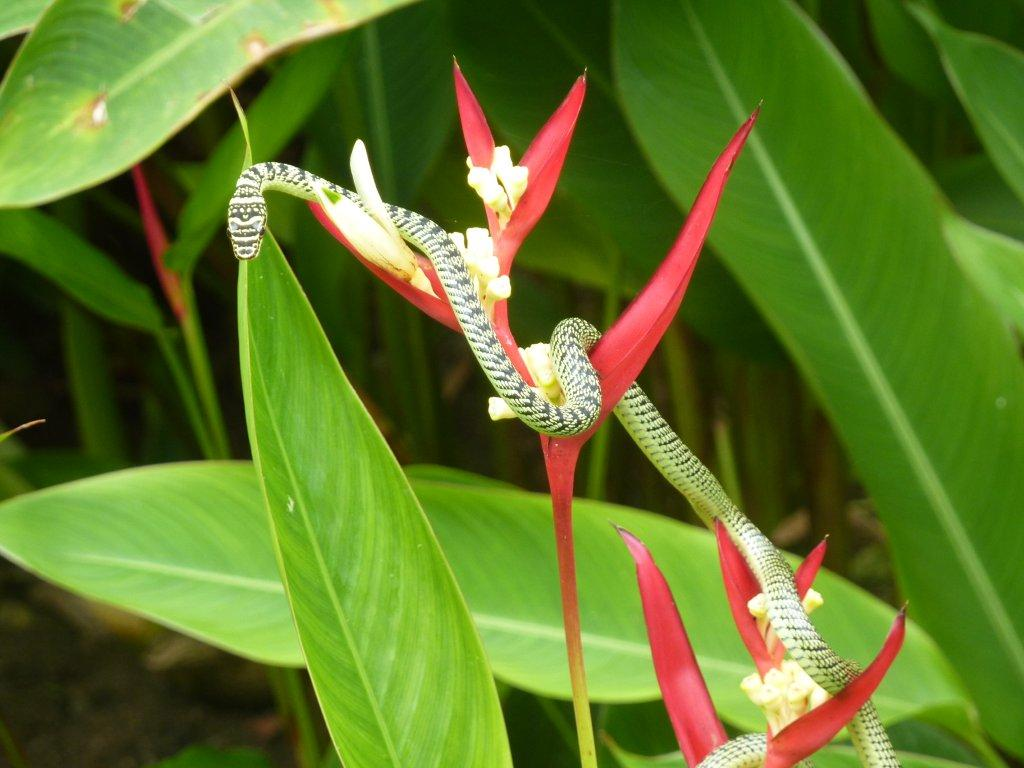
Lateral view

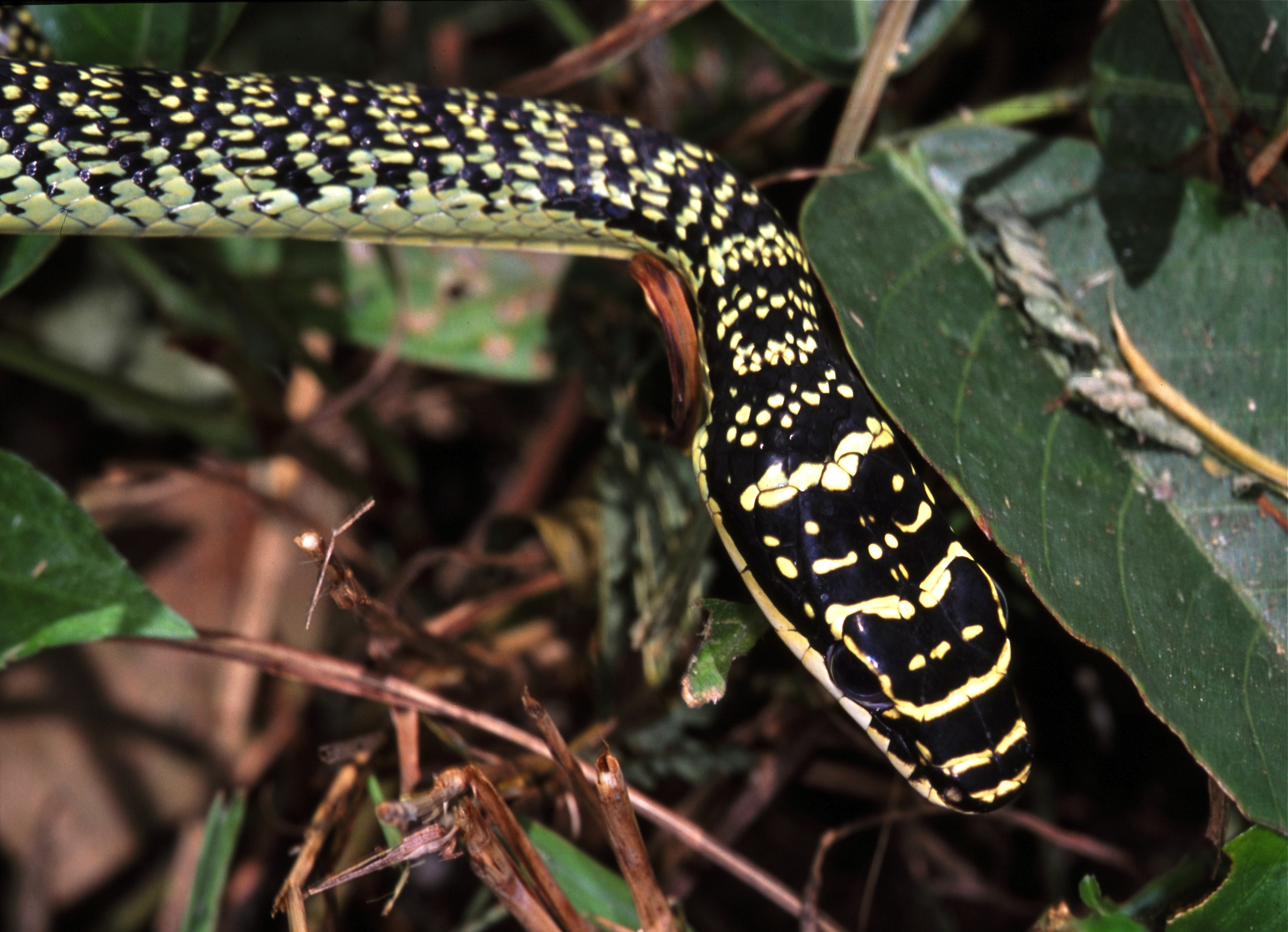
Head

===== Genus: Coelognathus =====
====== Coelognathus helena (trinket snake / കാട്ടുപാമ്പ്) ======
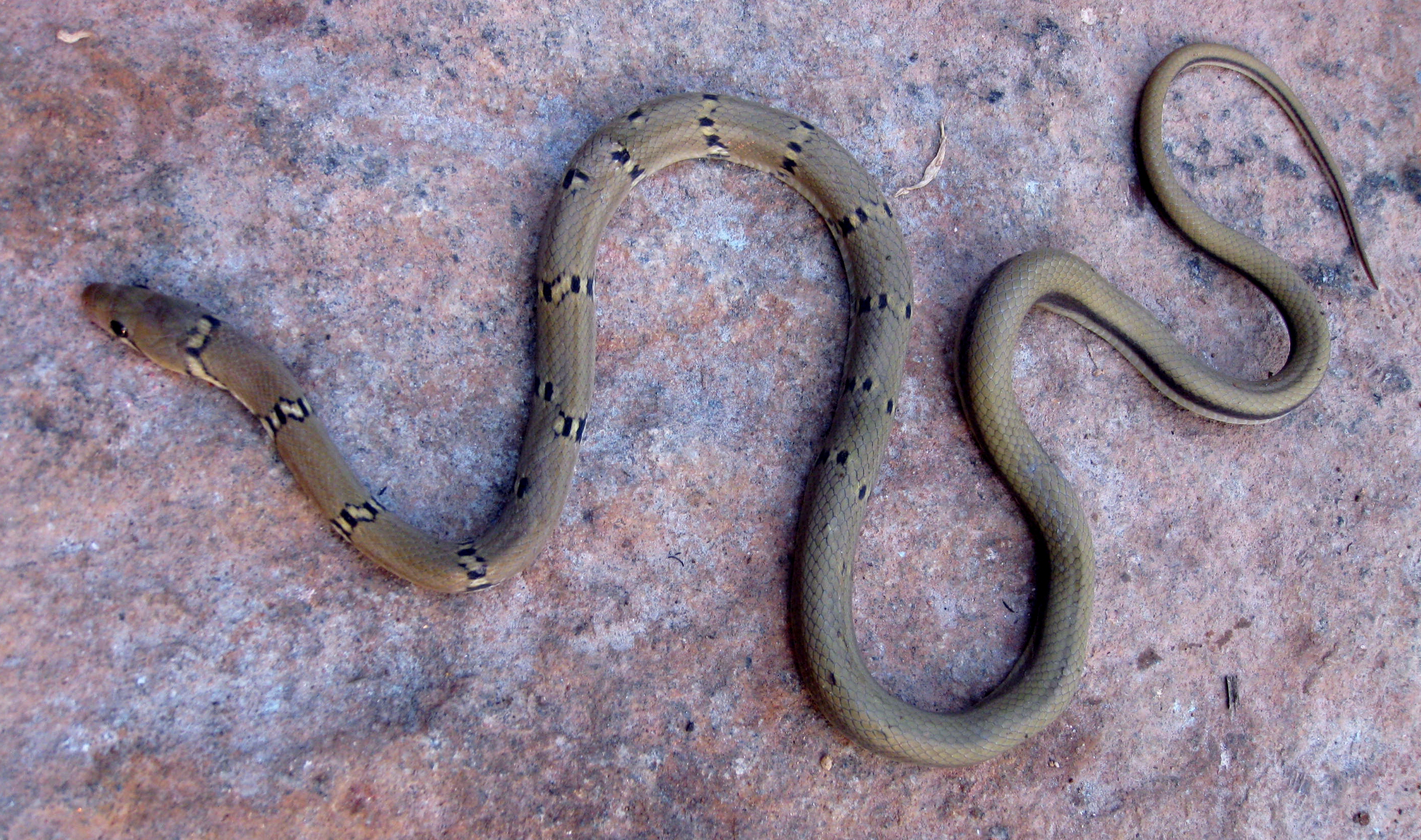
Dorsal view

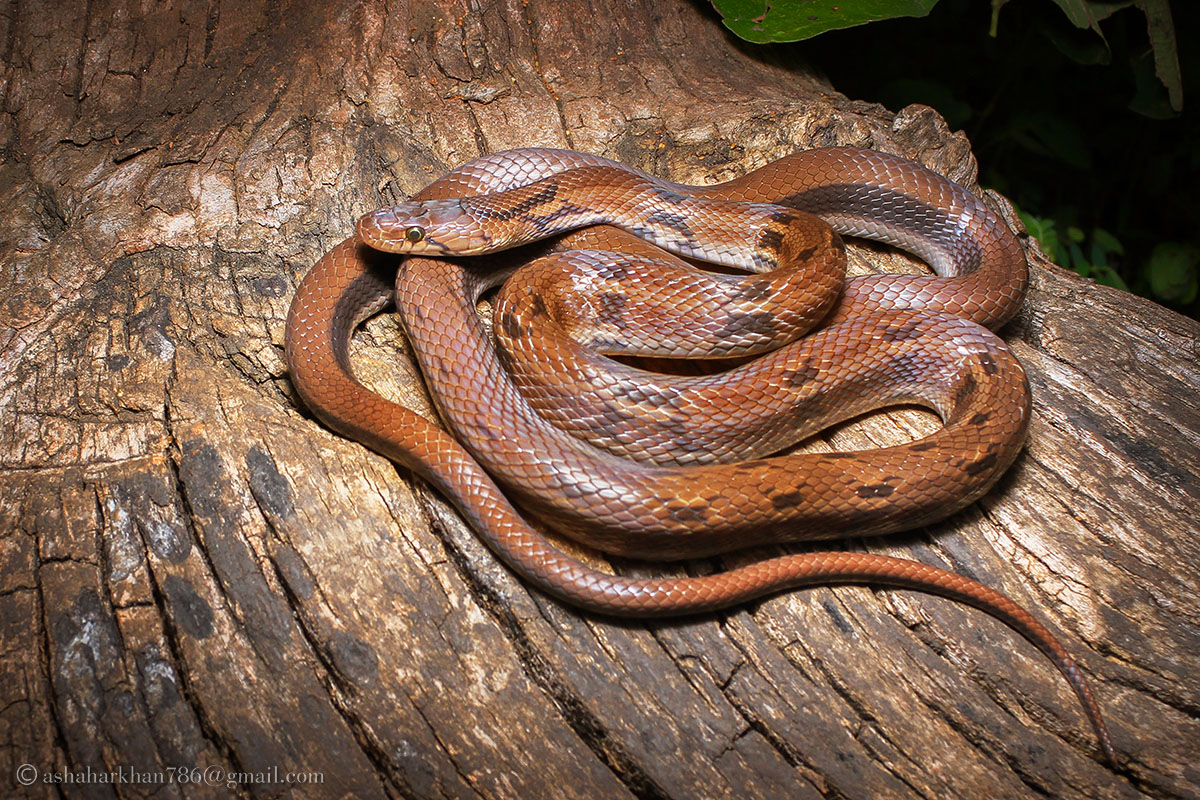
Lateral view

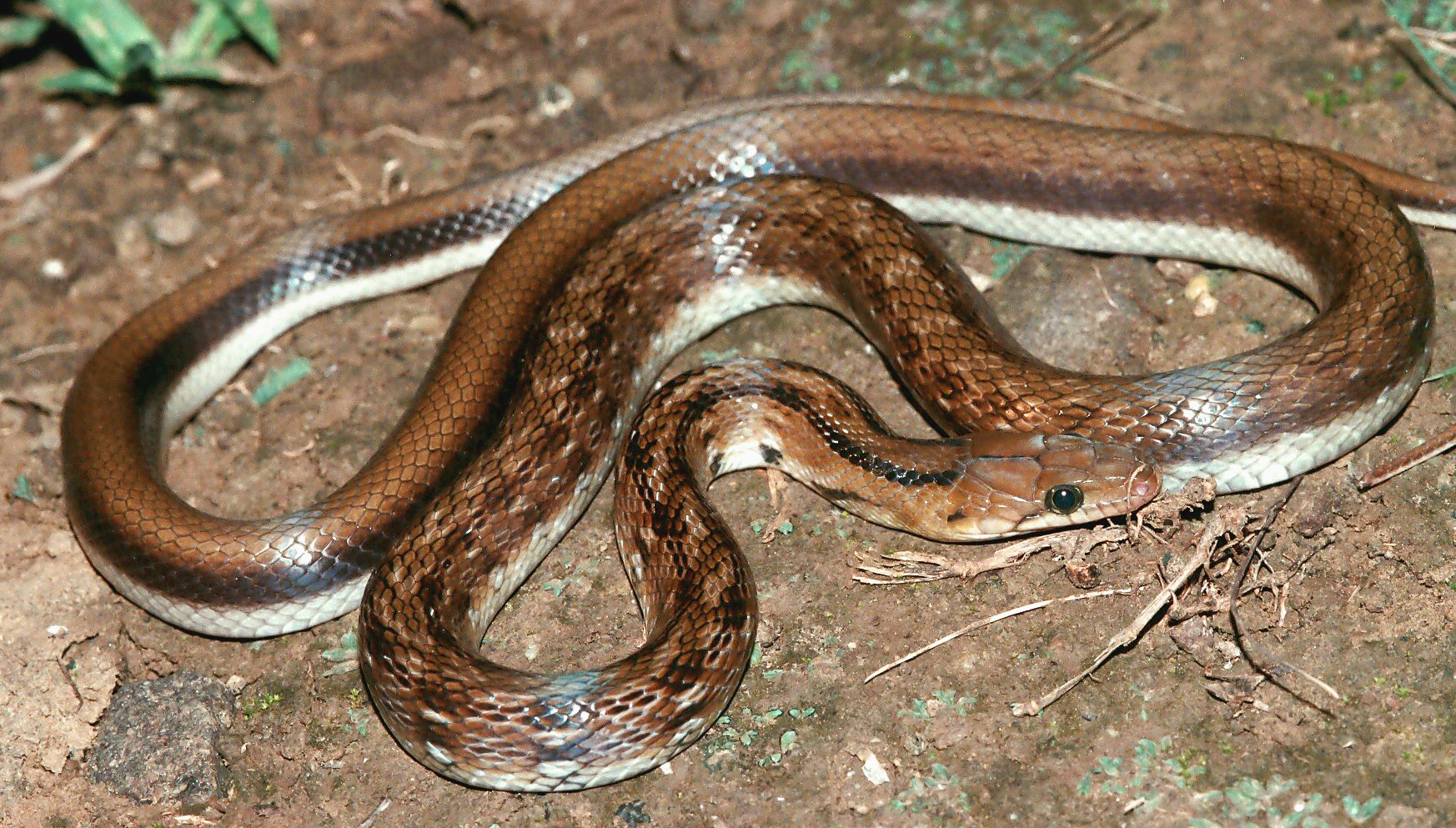
Lateral view

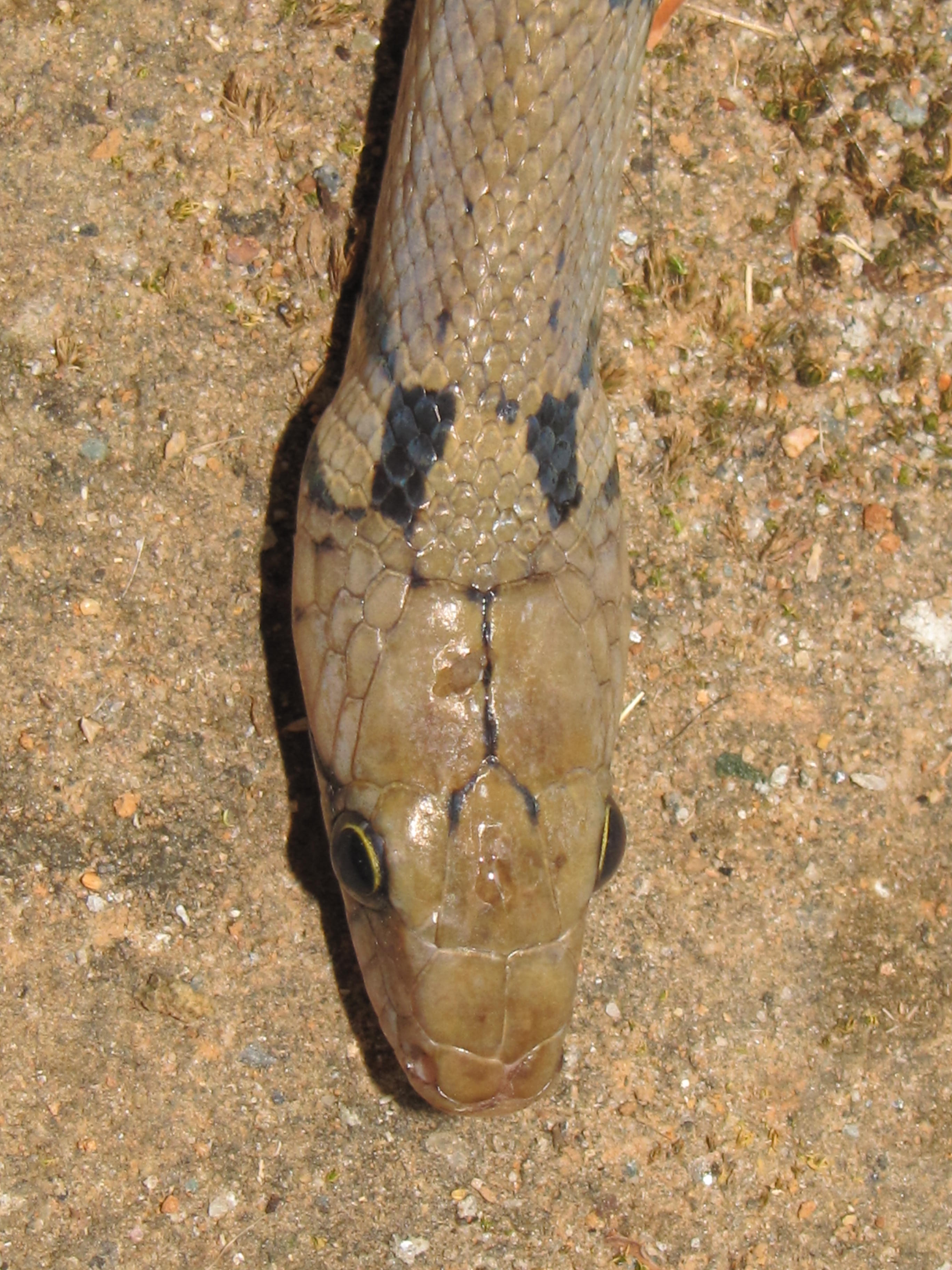
Head

===== Genus: Dendrelaphis =====
====== Dendrelaphis chairecaeos/chairecacos (southern bronzeback / നൽവരയൻകൊംബെരി പാമ്പ്) ======
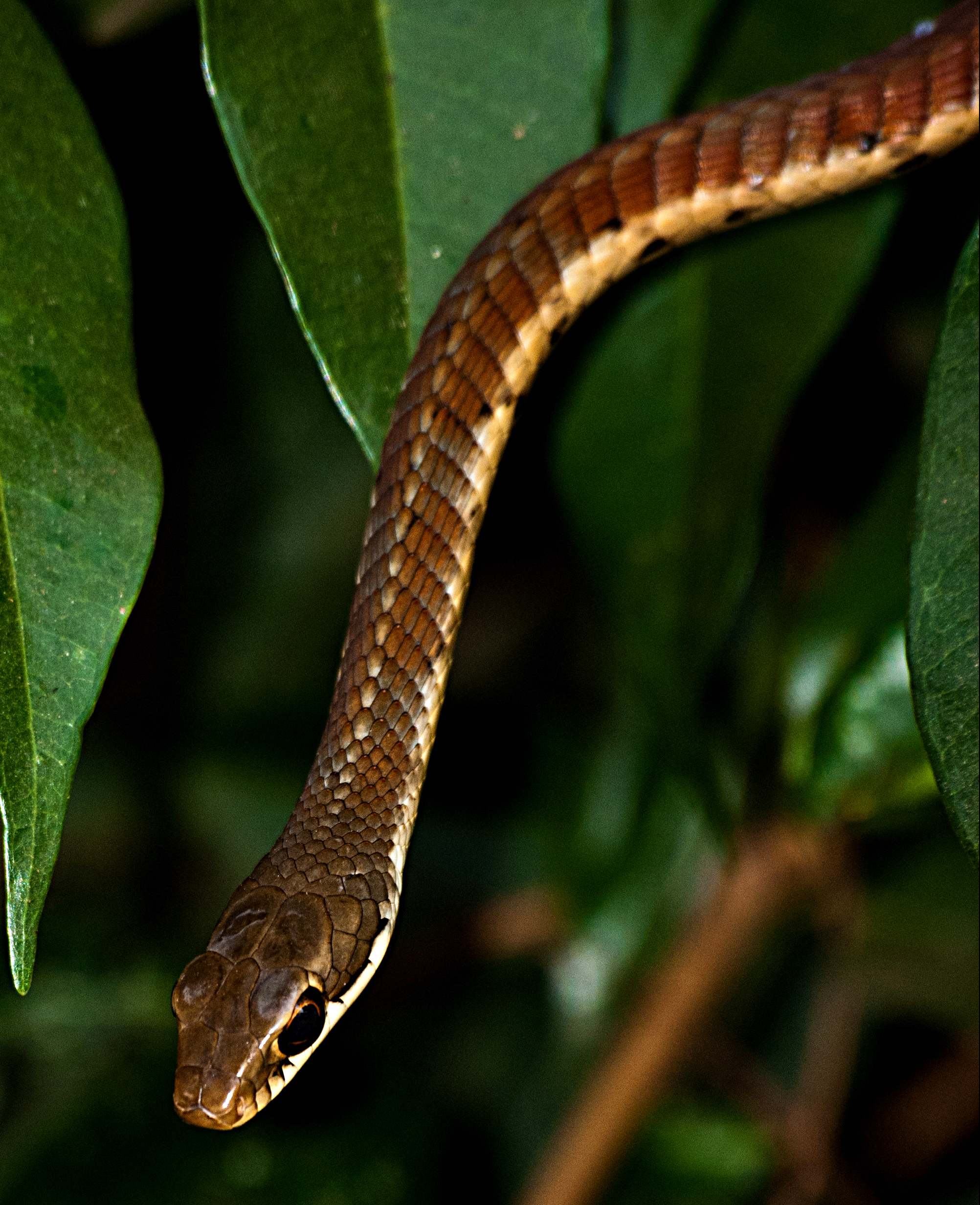
Head

====== Dendrelaphis girii (Giri's bronzeback / കാട്ടുകൊംബെരി പാമ്പ്) ======
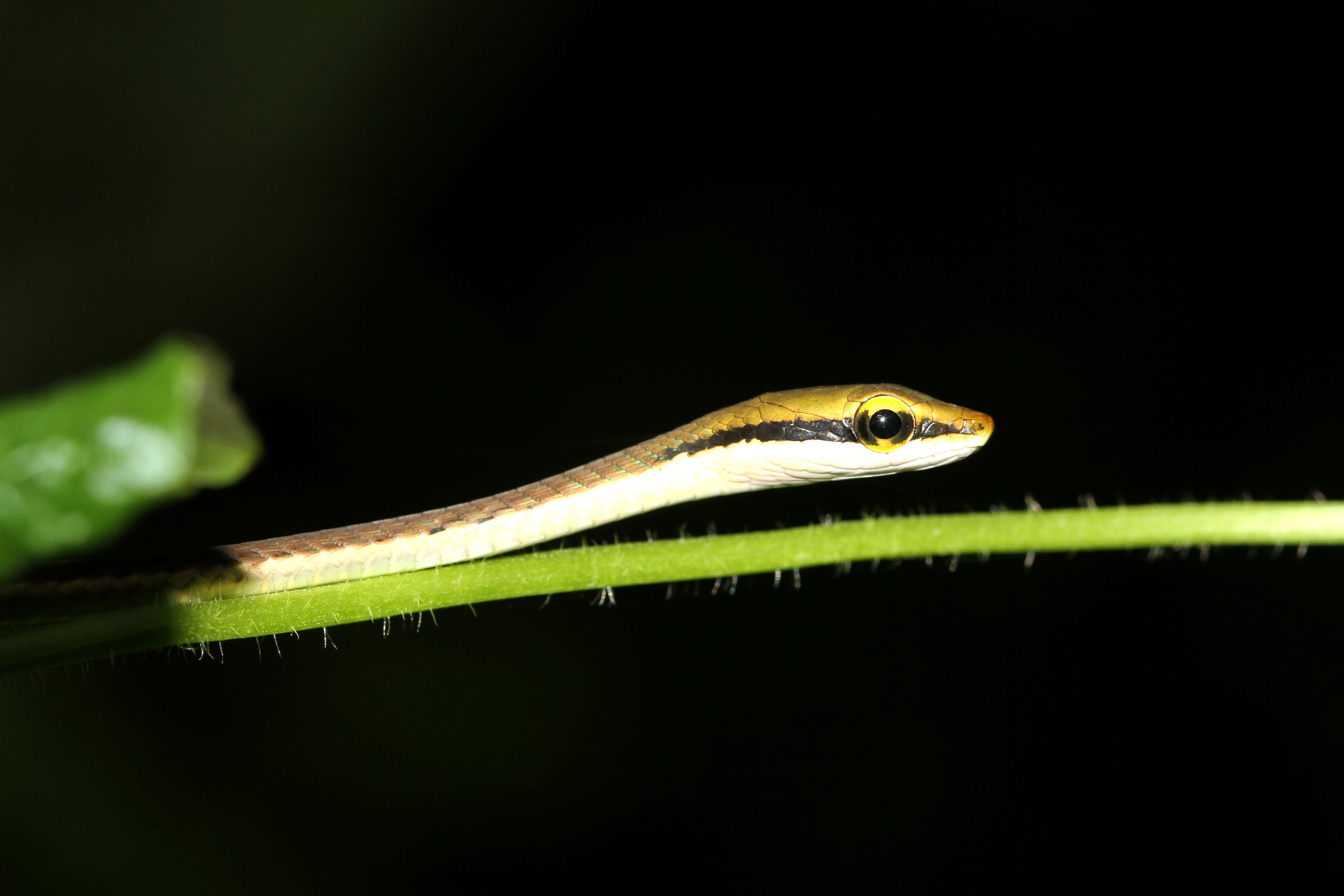
Lateral view

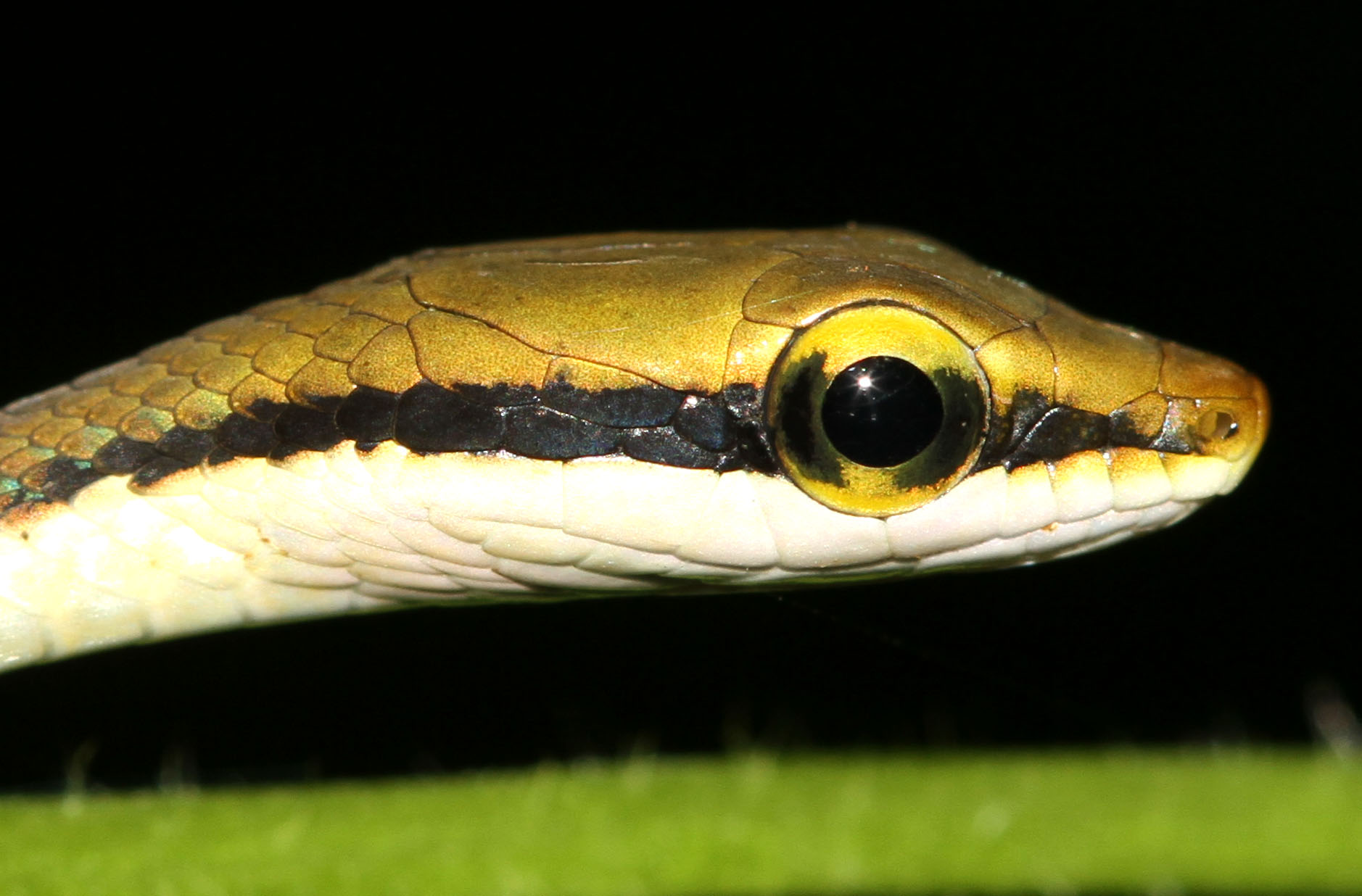
Head

====== Dendrelaphis grandoculis (large-eyed bronzeback / മലകൊംബെരി പാമ്പ്) ======
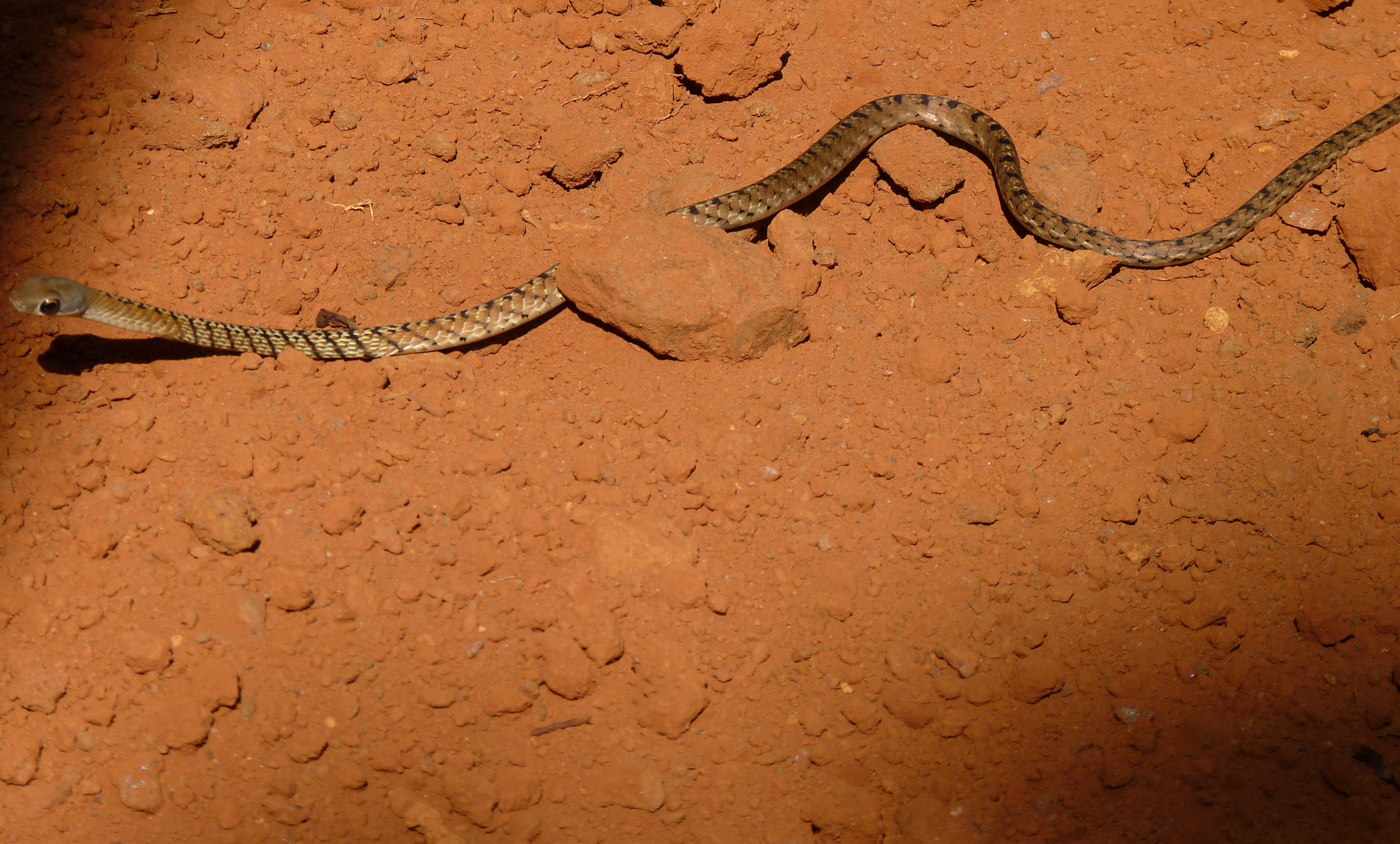
Lateral view

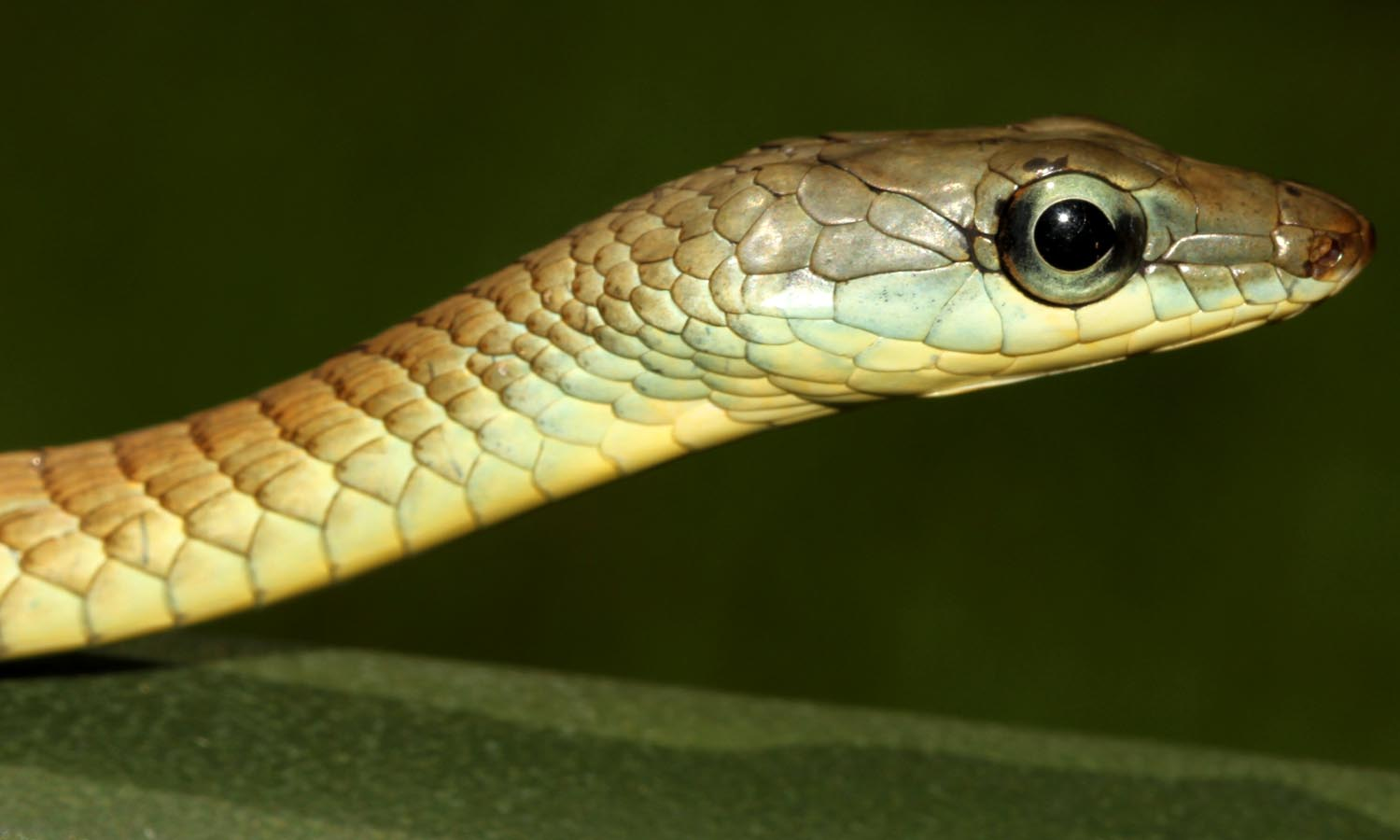
Head

====== Dendrelaphis tristis (common bronzeback / വില്ലൂന്നി) ======
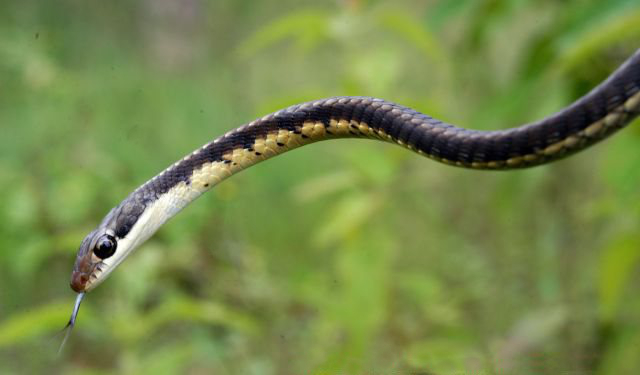
Lateral view

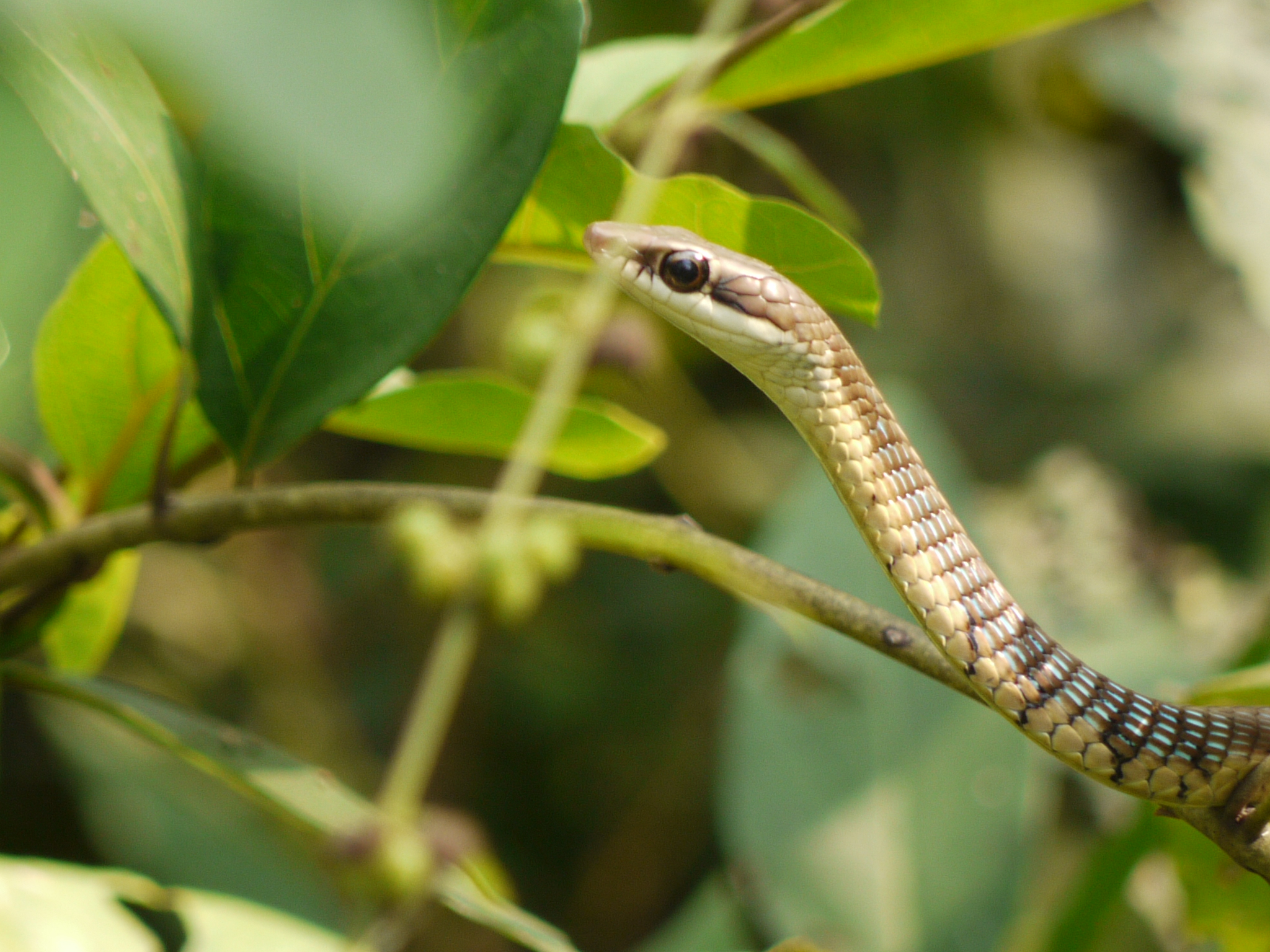
Lateral view

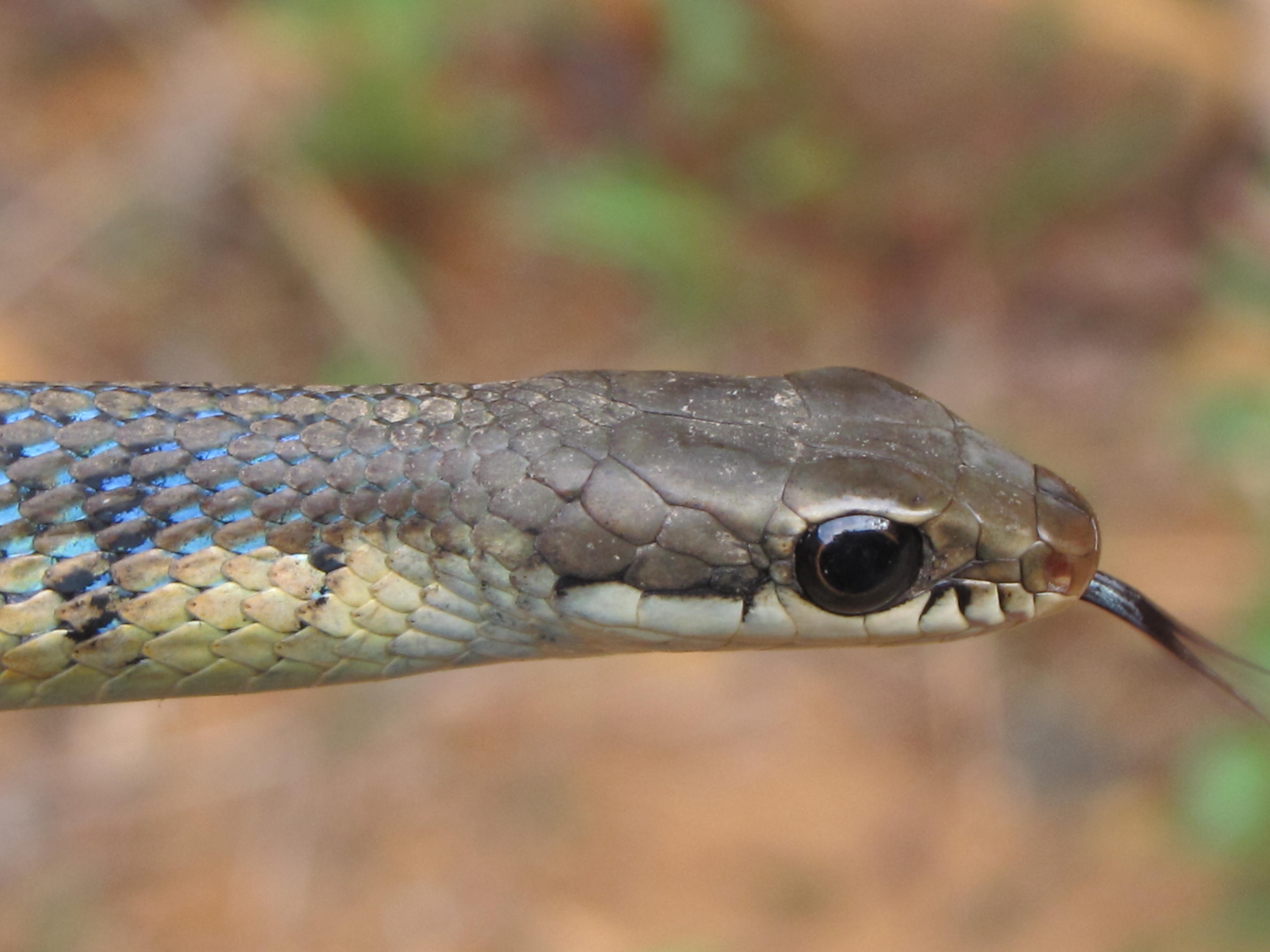
Head

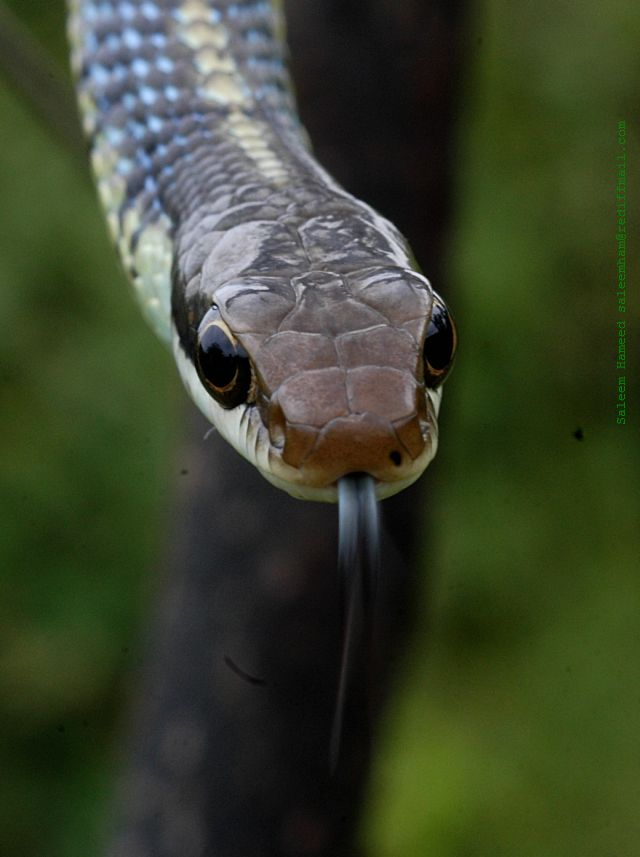
Front view

===== Genus: Lycodon =====
====== Lycodon aulicus (Indian wolf snake / വെള്ളിവരയൻ പാമ്പ്) ======
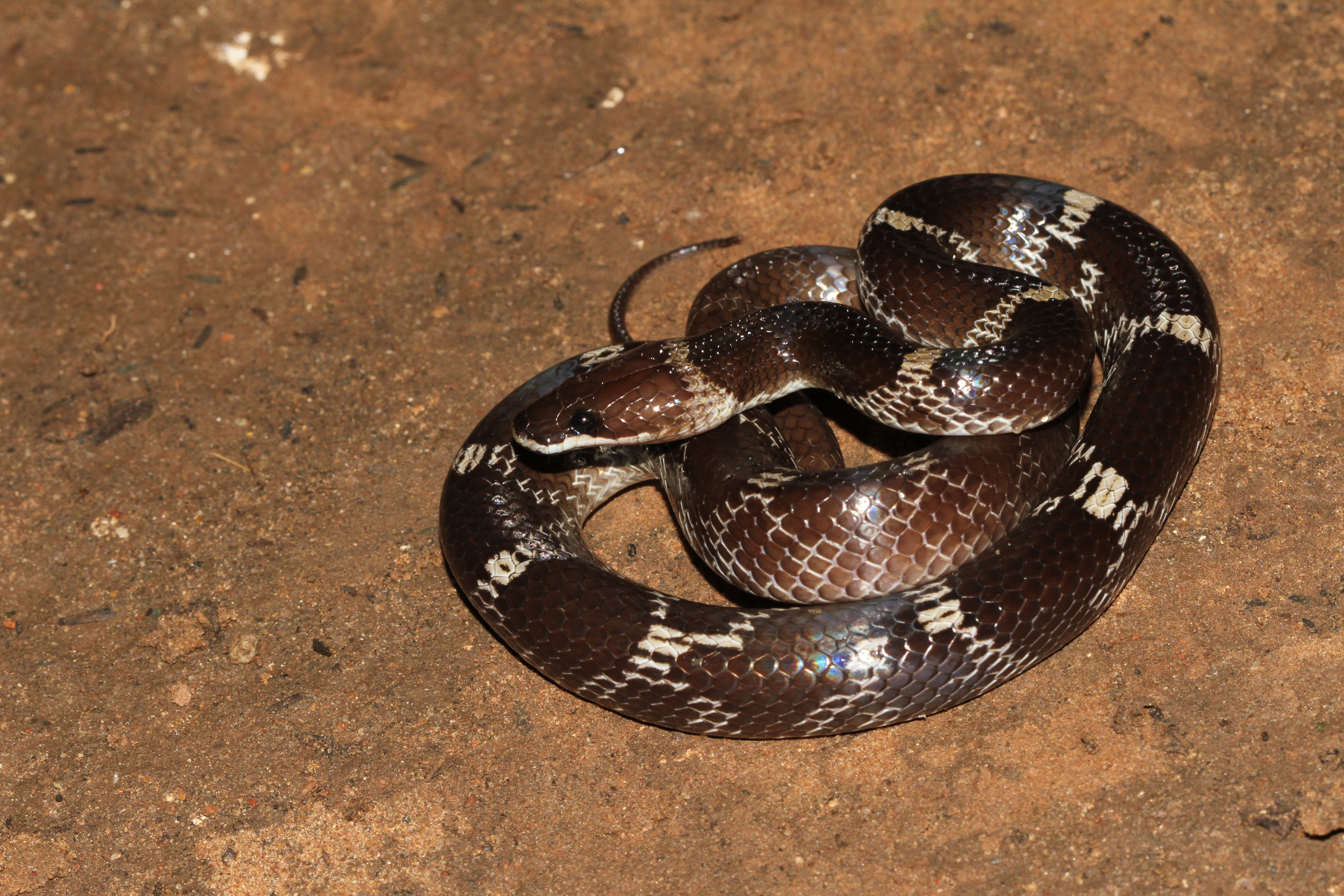
Lateral view

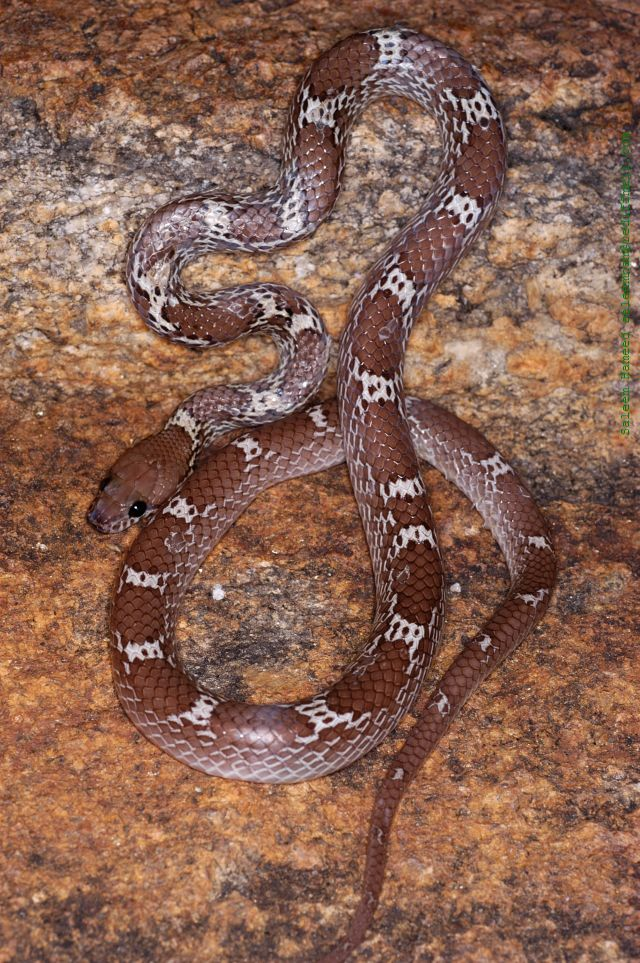
Dorsal view

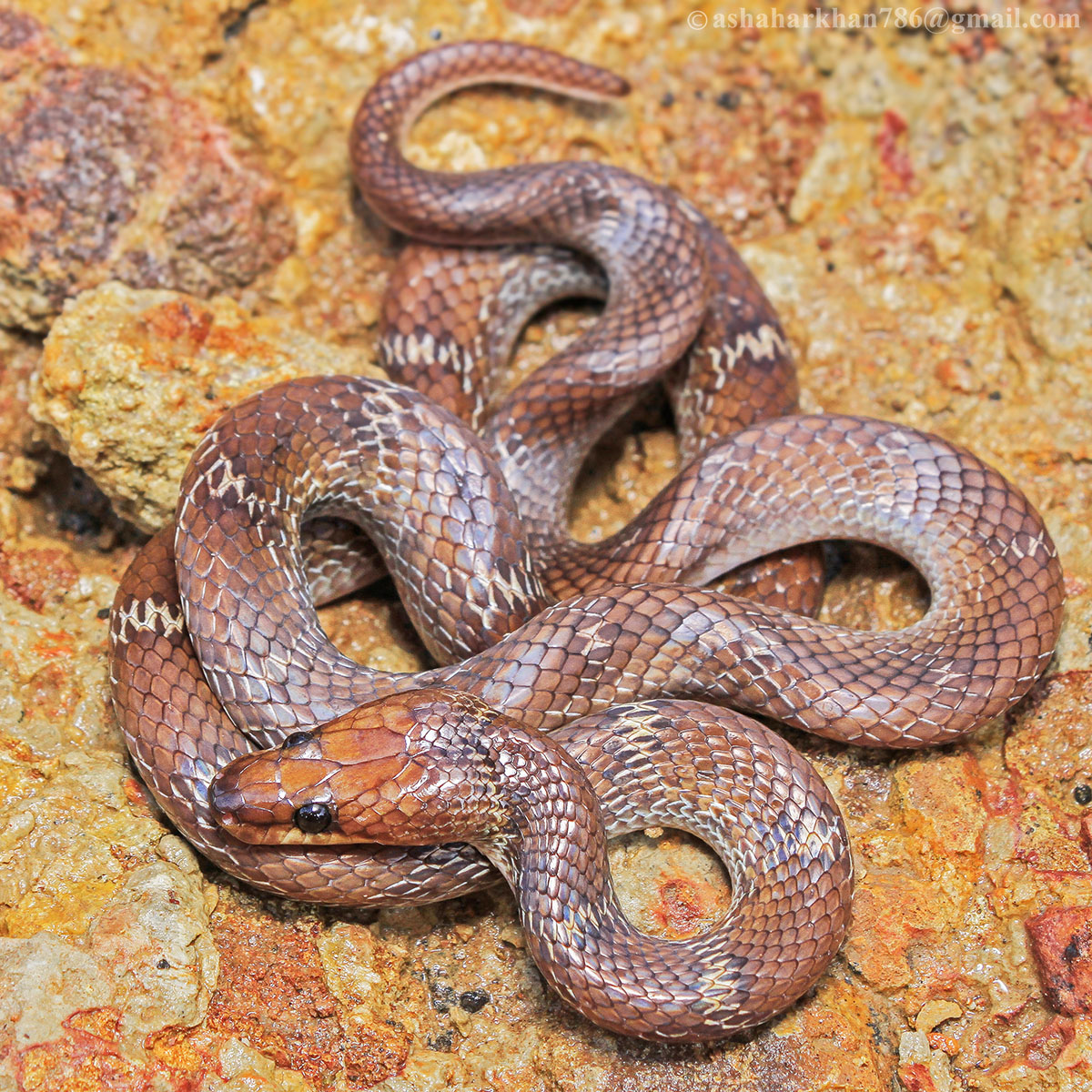
Dorsal view

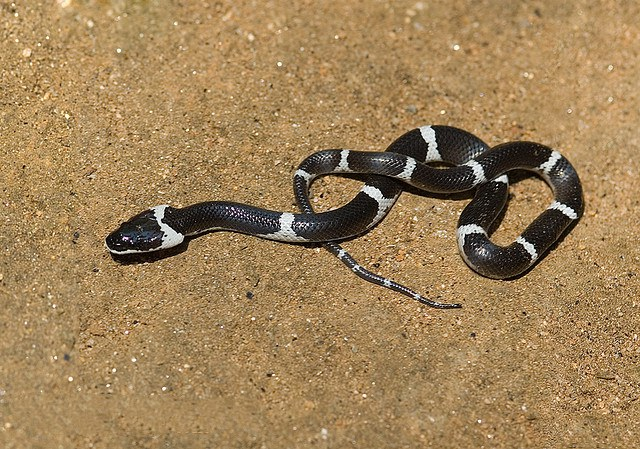
Melanistic form

====== Lycodon nympha (bridal snake) ======
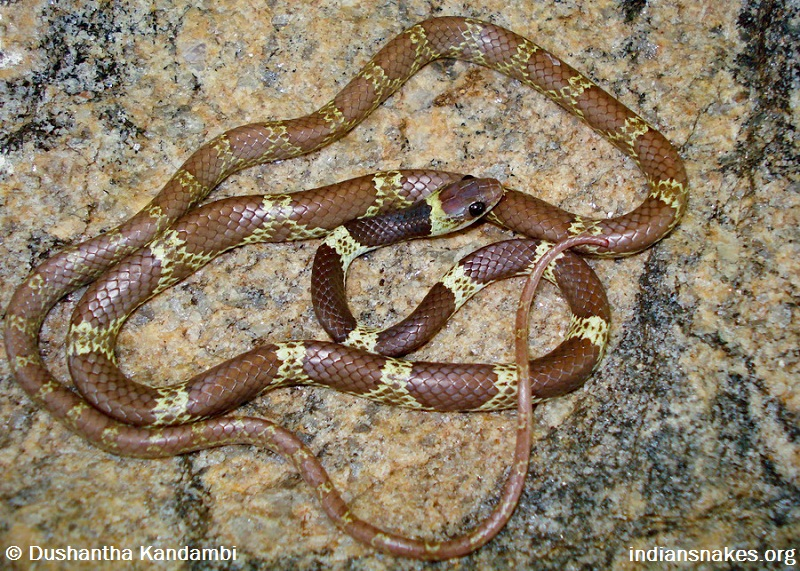
Dorsal view

====== Lycodon striatus (barred wolf snake / വരവരയൻ പാമ്പ്) ======
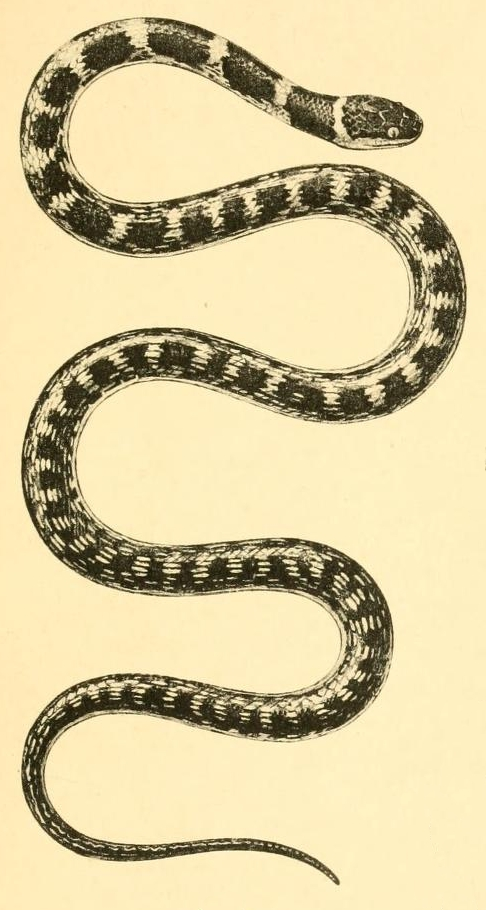
Illustration

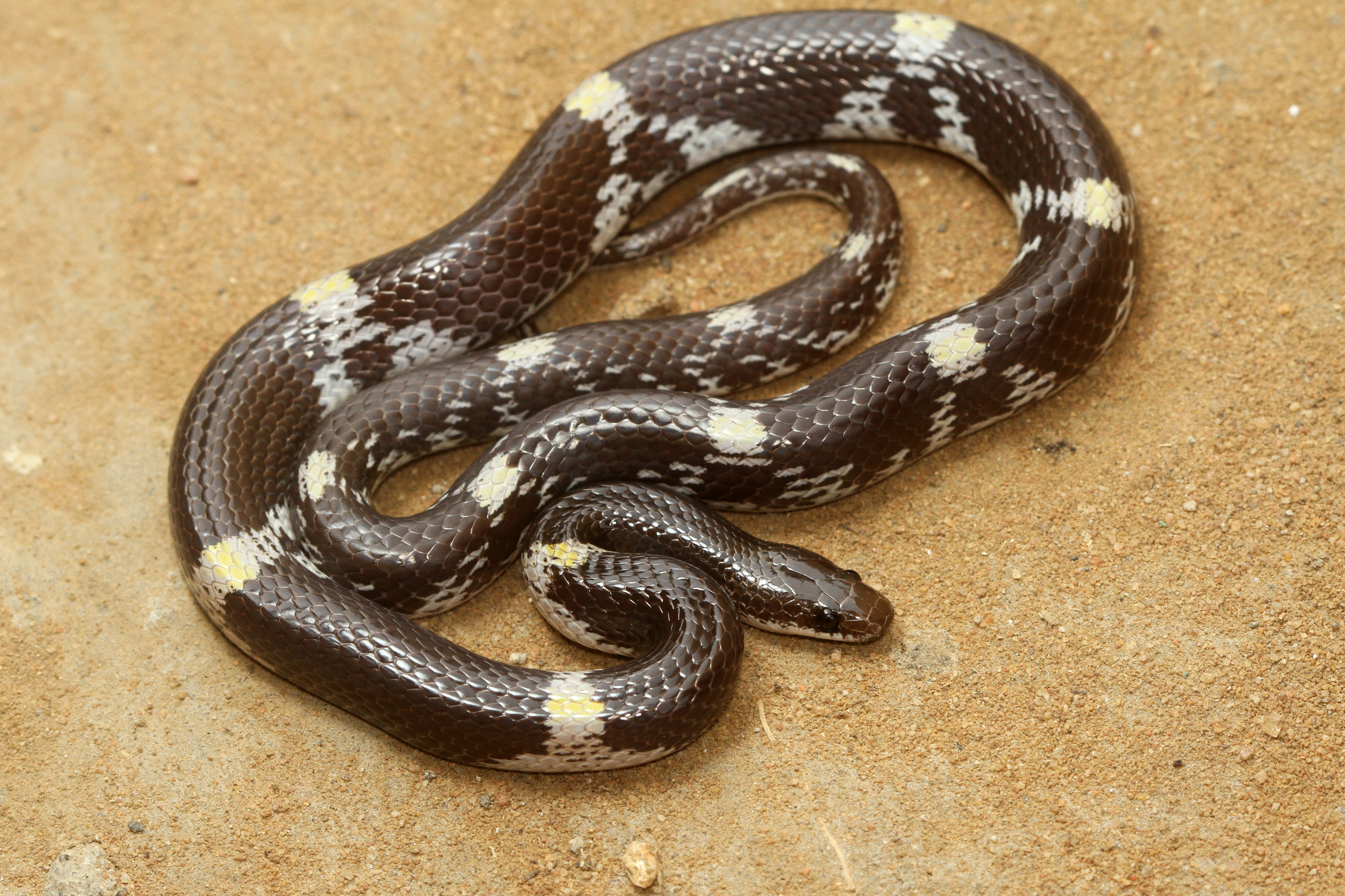
Dorsal view

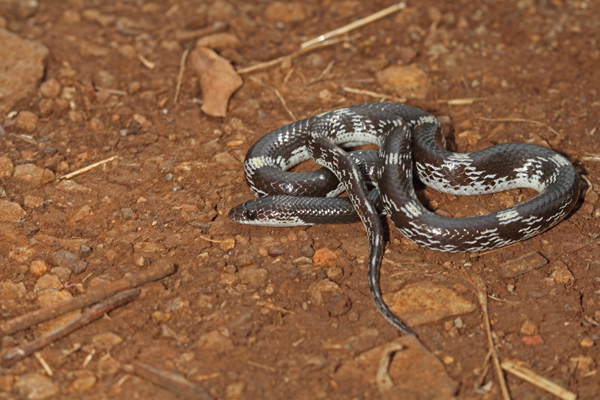
Lateral view

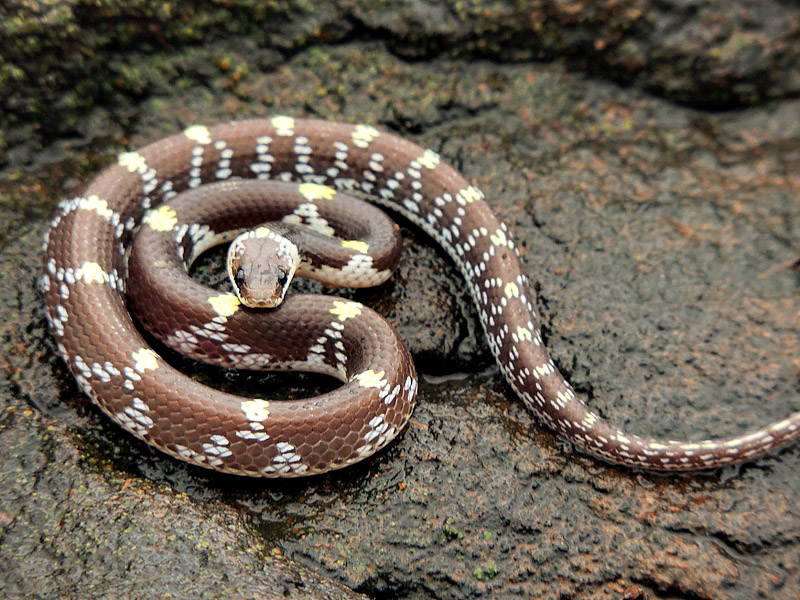
Head

====== Lycodon travancoricus (Travancore wolf snake / തിരുവിതാംകൂർ വെള്ളിവരയൻ‍) ======
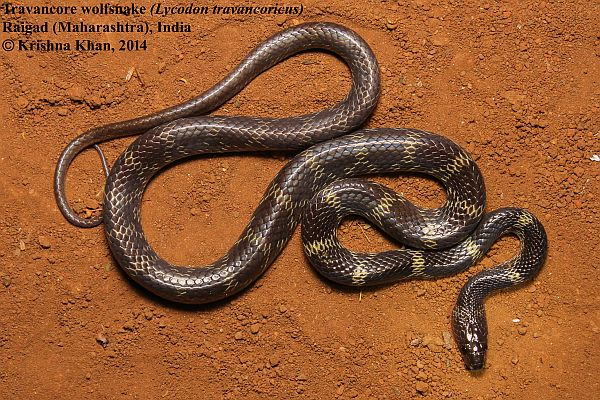
Dorsal view

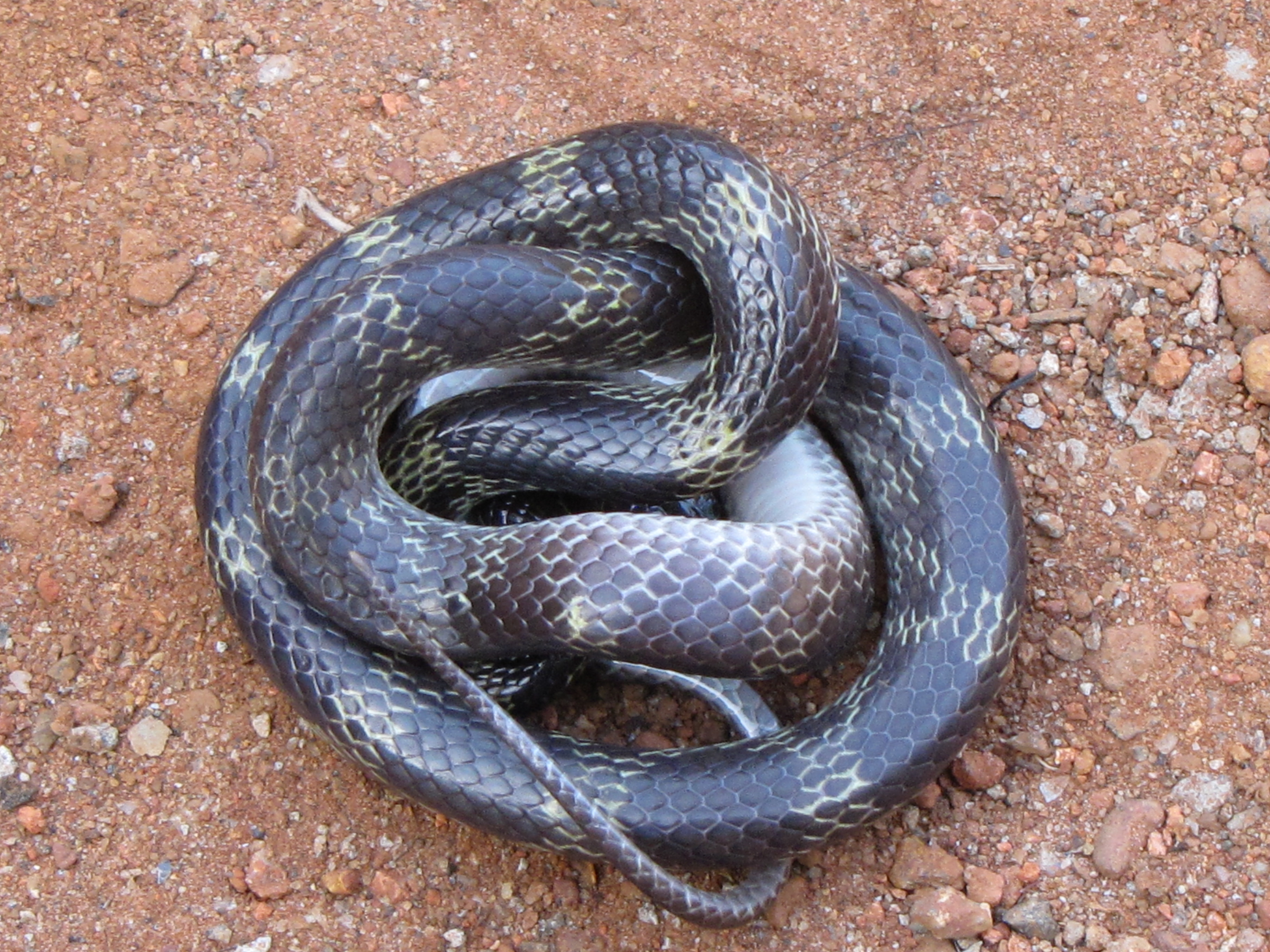
Dorsal view

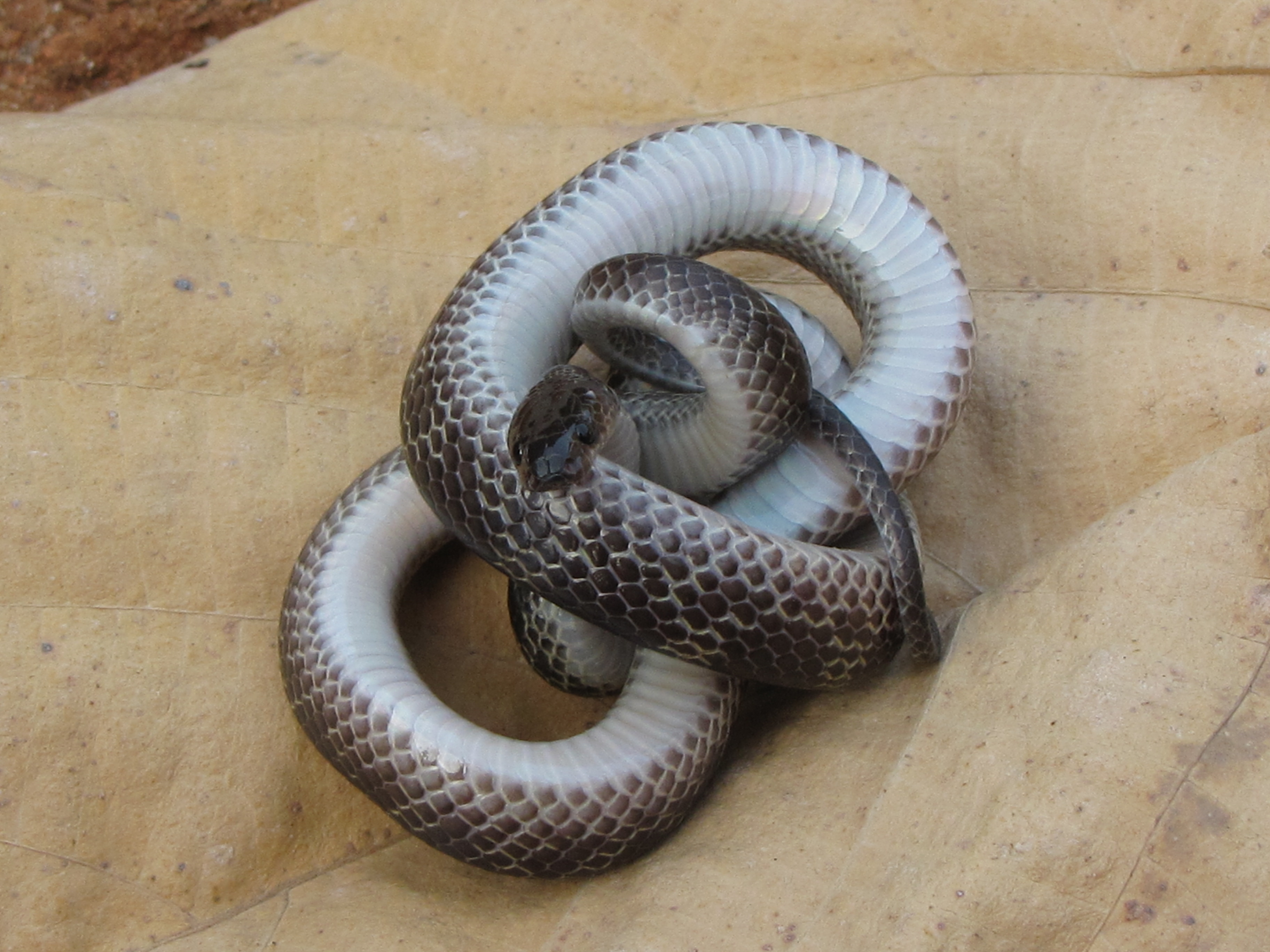
Ventral view

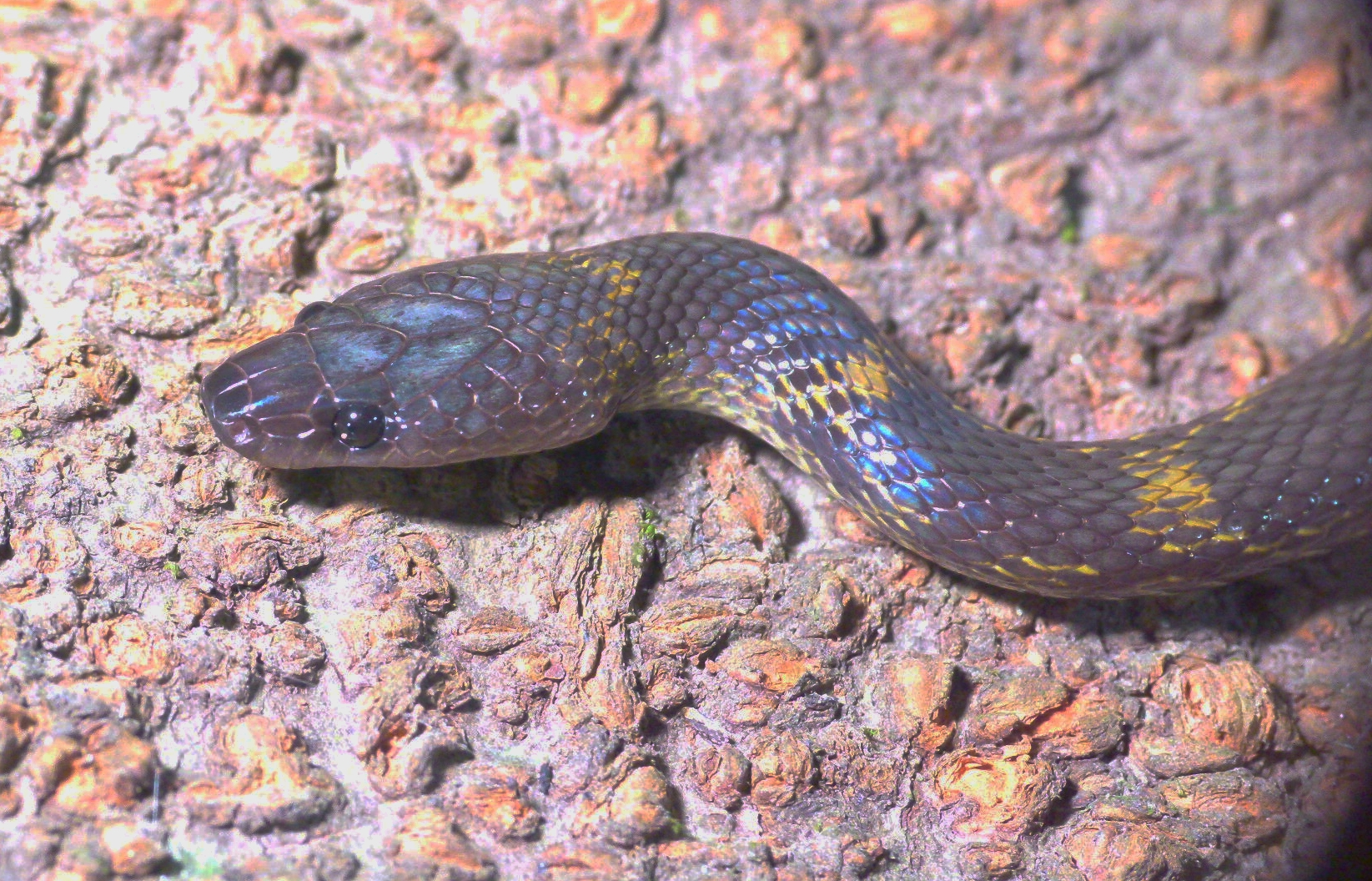
Head

===== Genus: Oligodon =====
====== Oligodon affinis (western kukri / മലഞ്ചുരുട്ട) ======
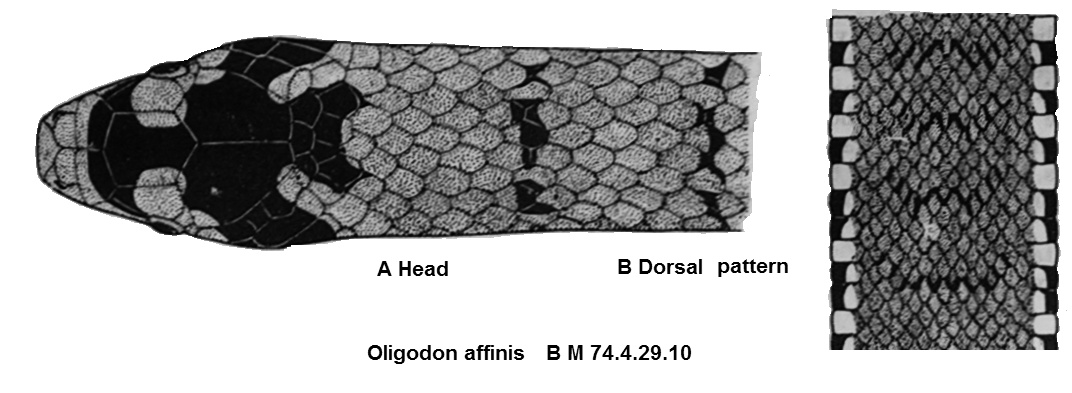
Illustration

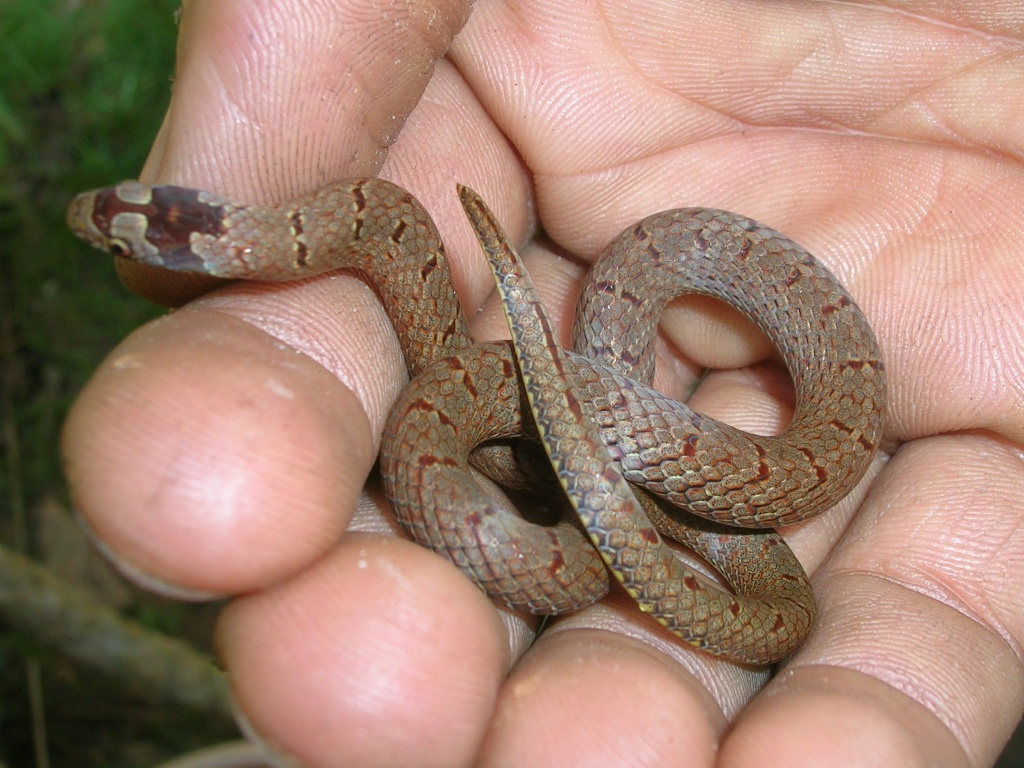
Dorsal view

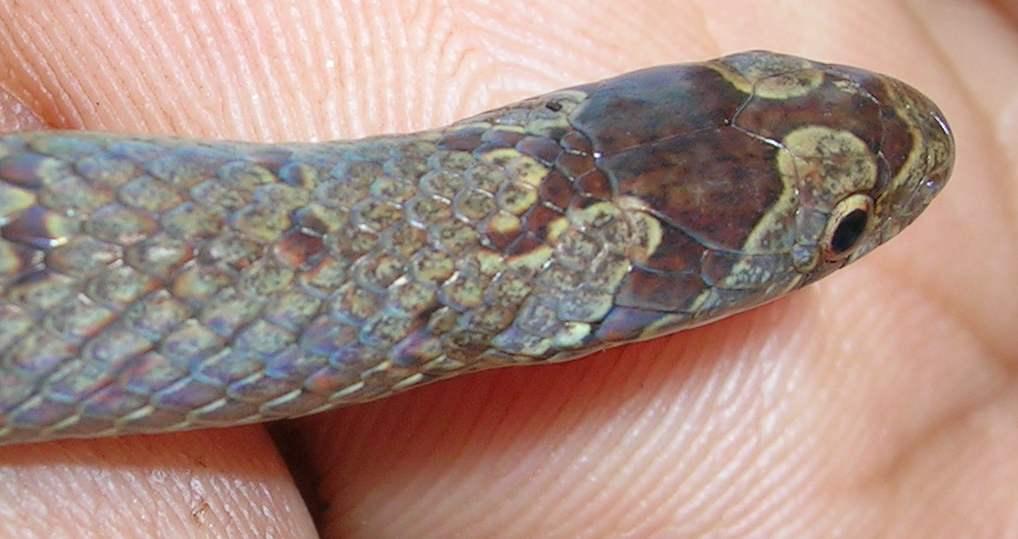
Head

====== Oligodon arnensis (banded kukri / വരയൻ ചുരുട്ട) ======
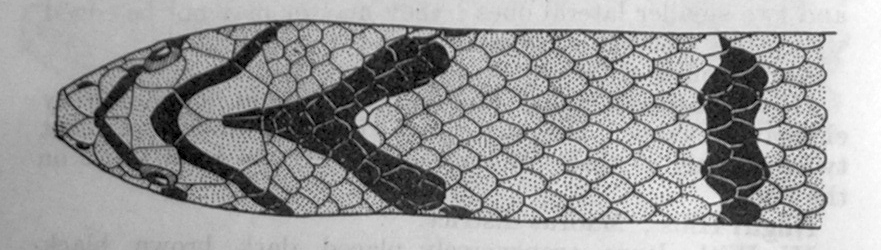
Illustration

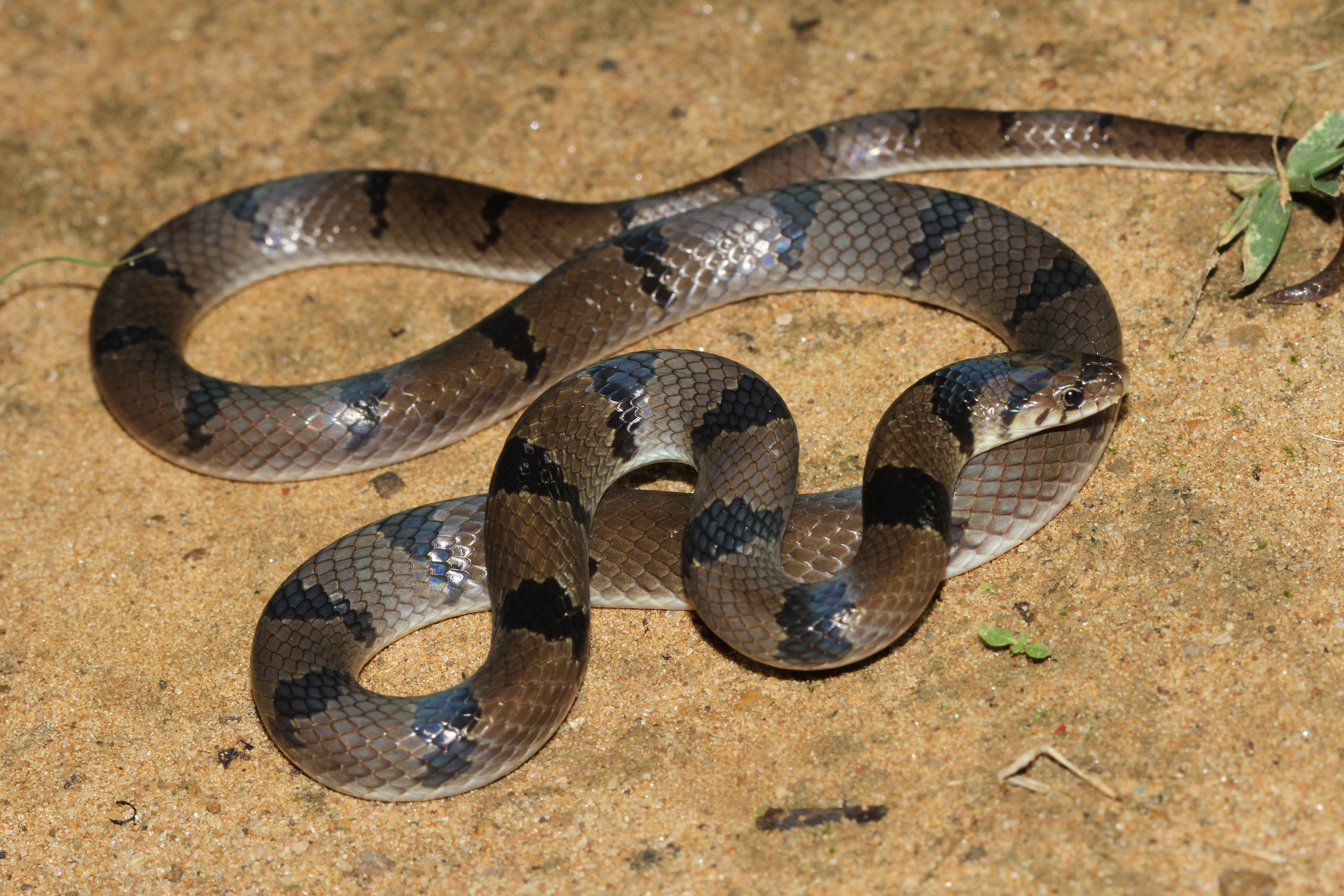
Dorsal view

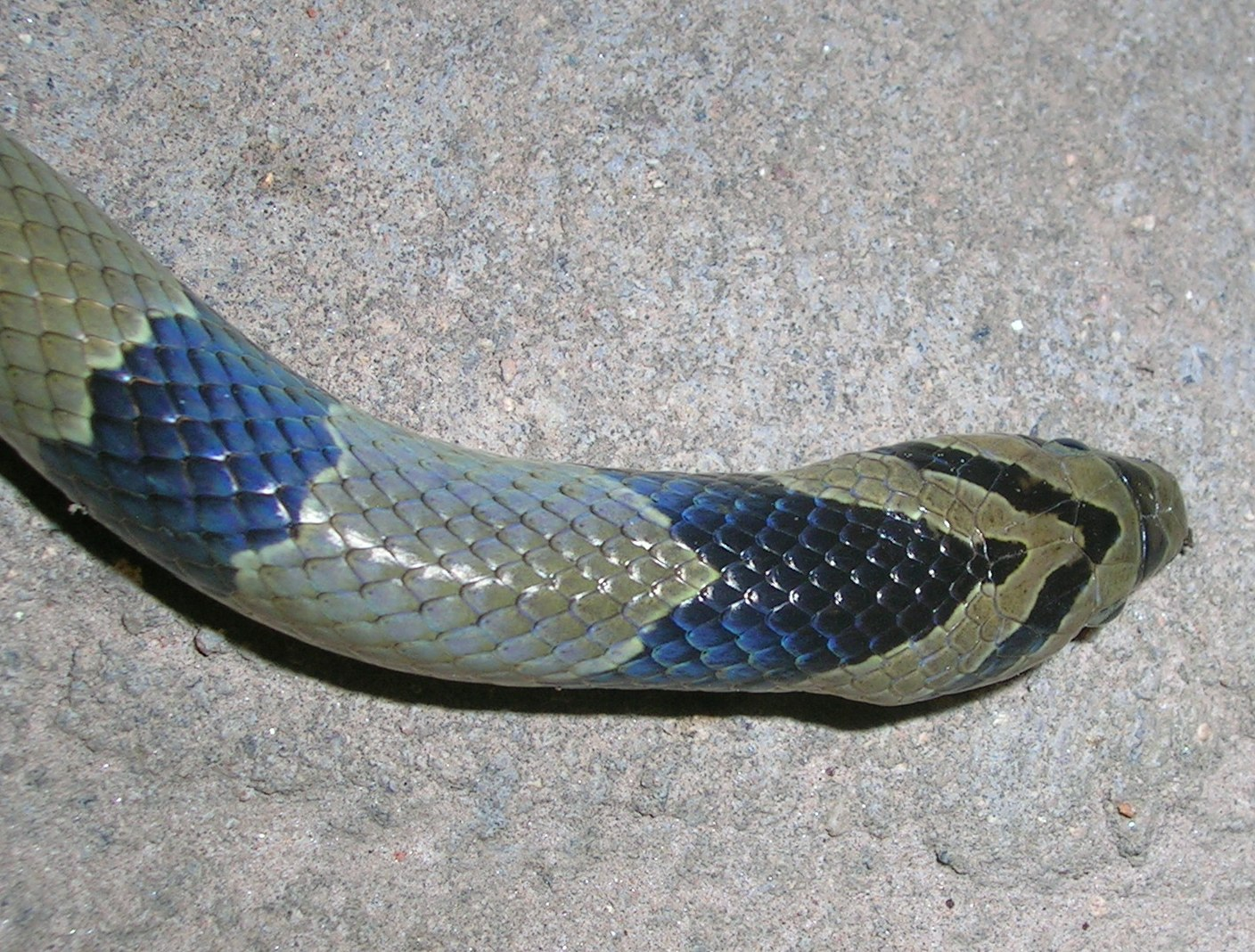
Head

====== Oligodon brevicauda (shorthead kukri / കുട്ടിവാലൻ ചുരുട്ട) ======
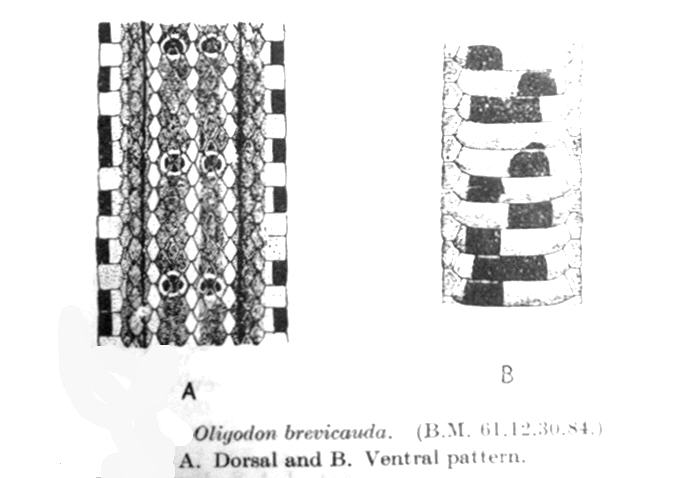
Illustration

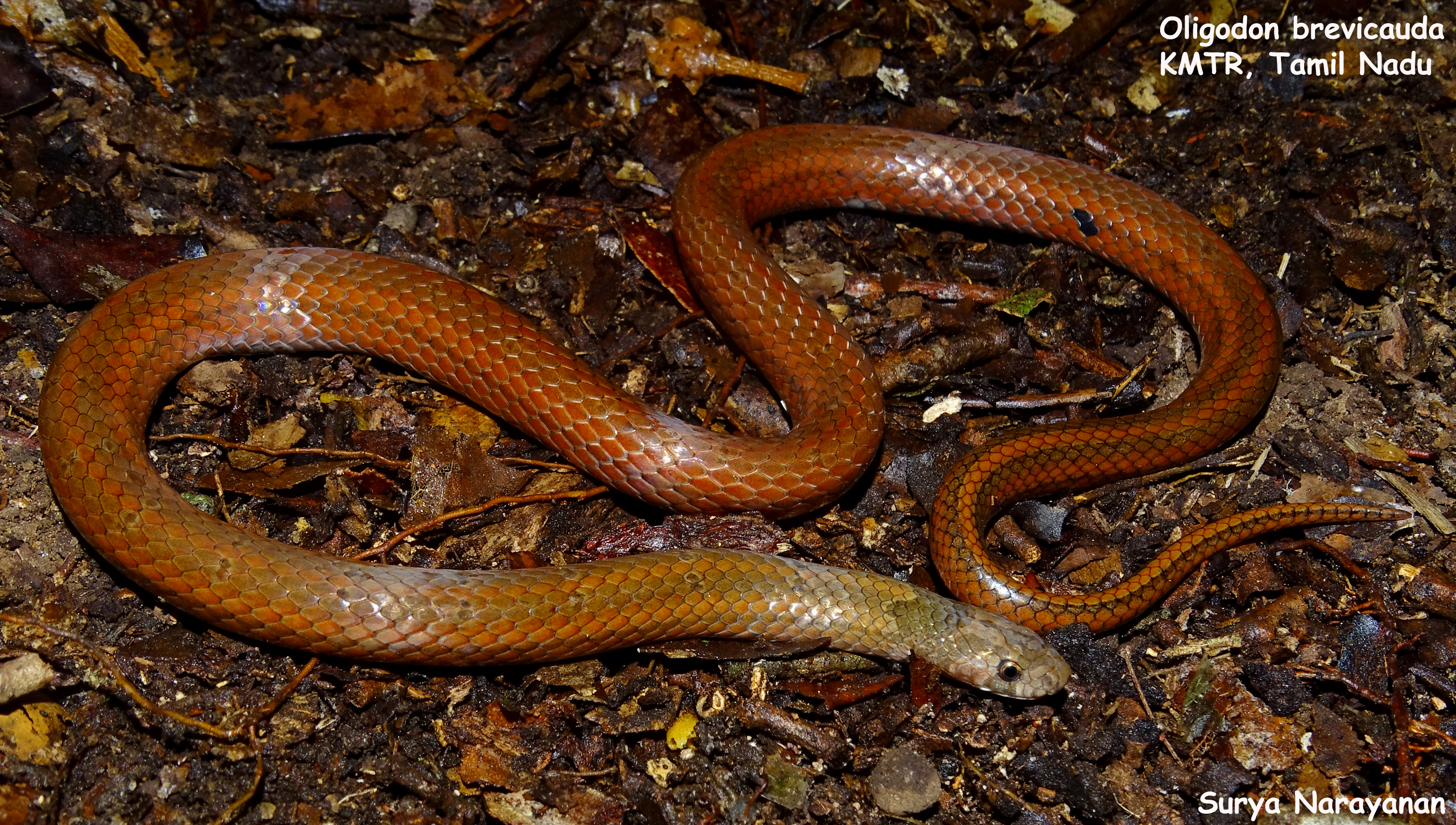
Lateral view

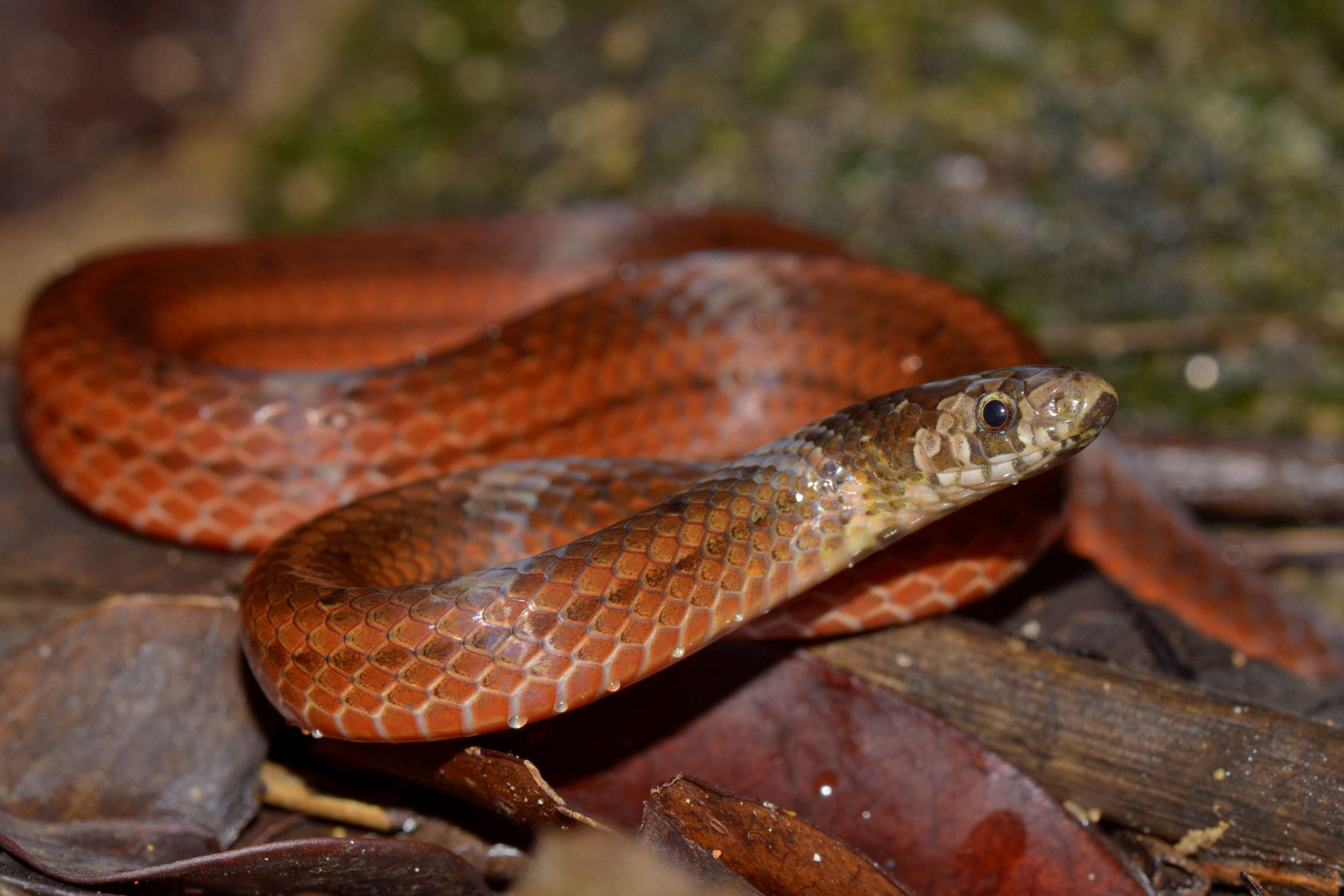
Head

====== Oligodon taeniolatus (streaked kukri) ======
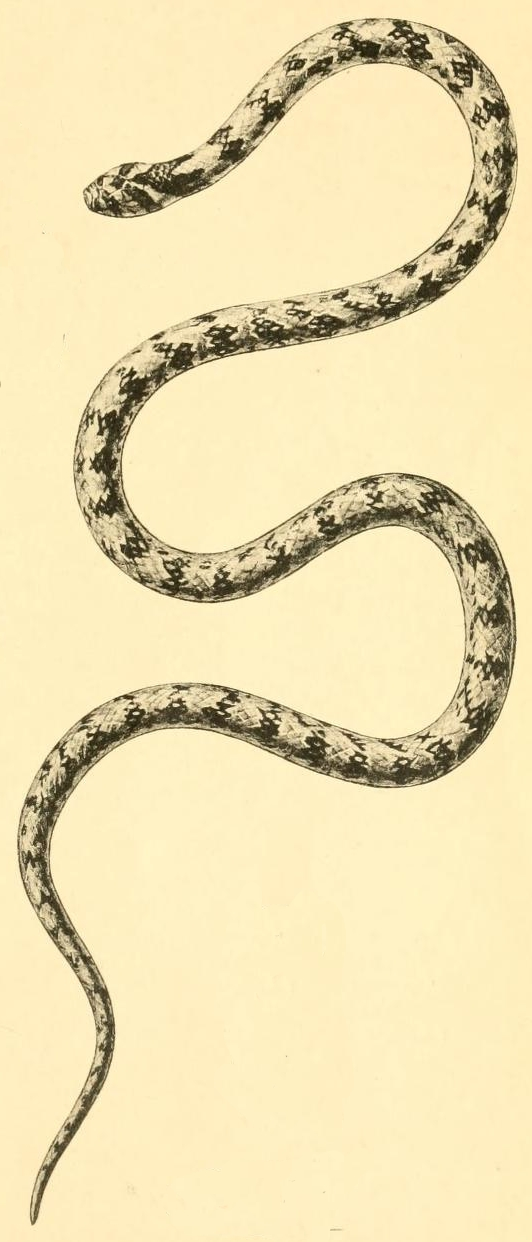
Illustration

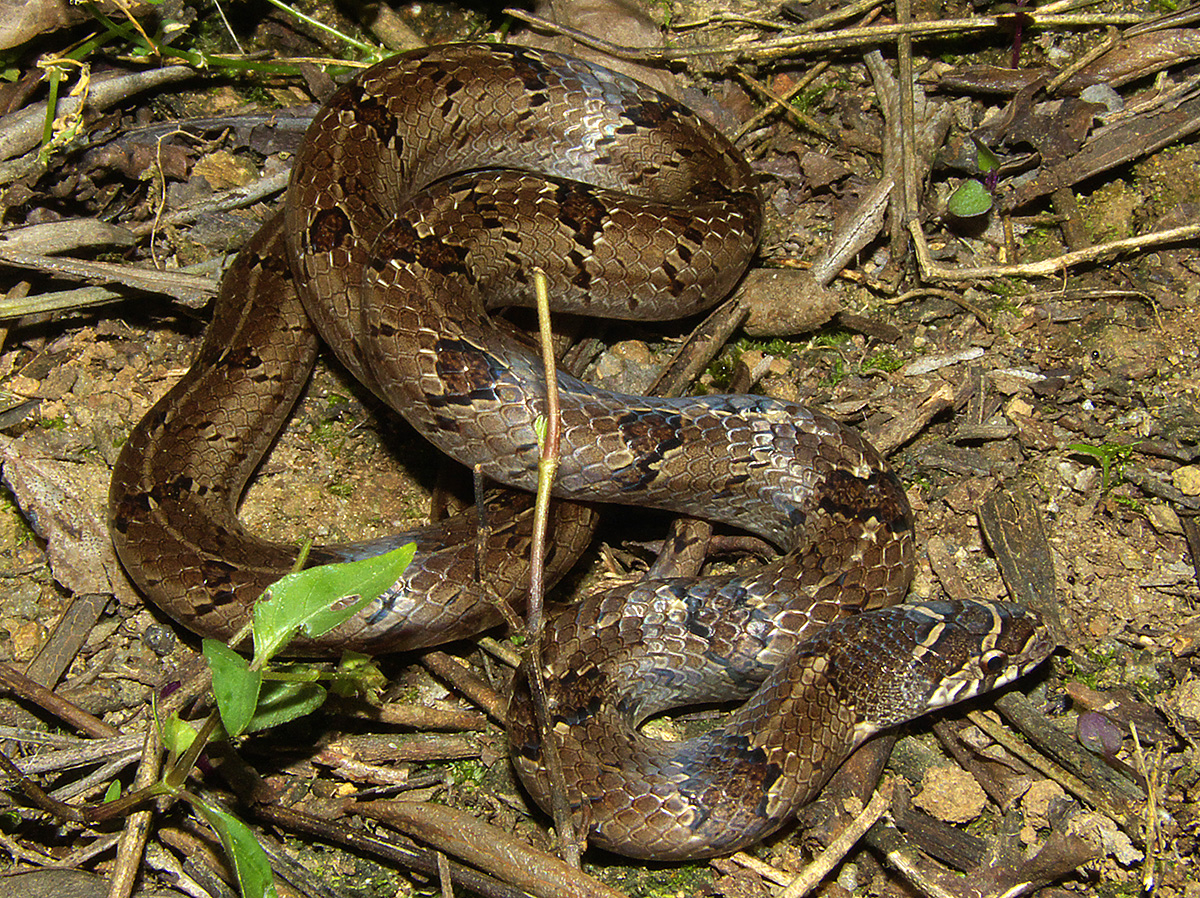
Dorsal view

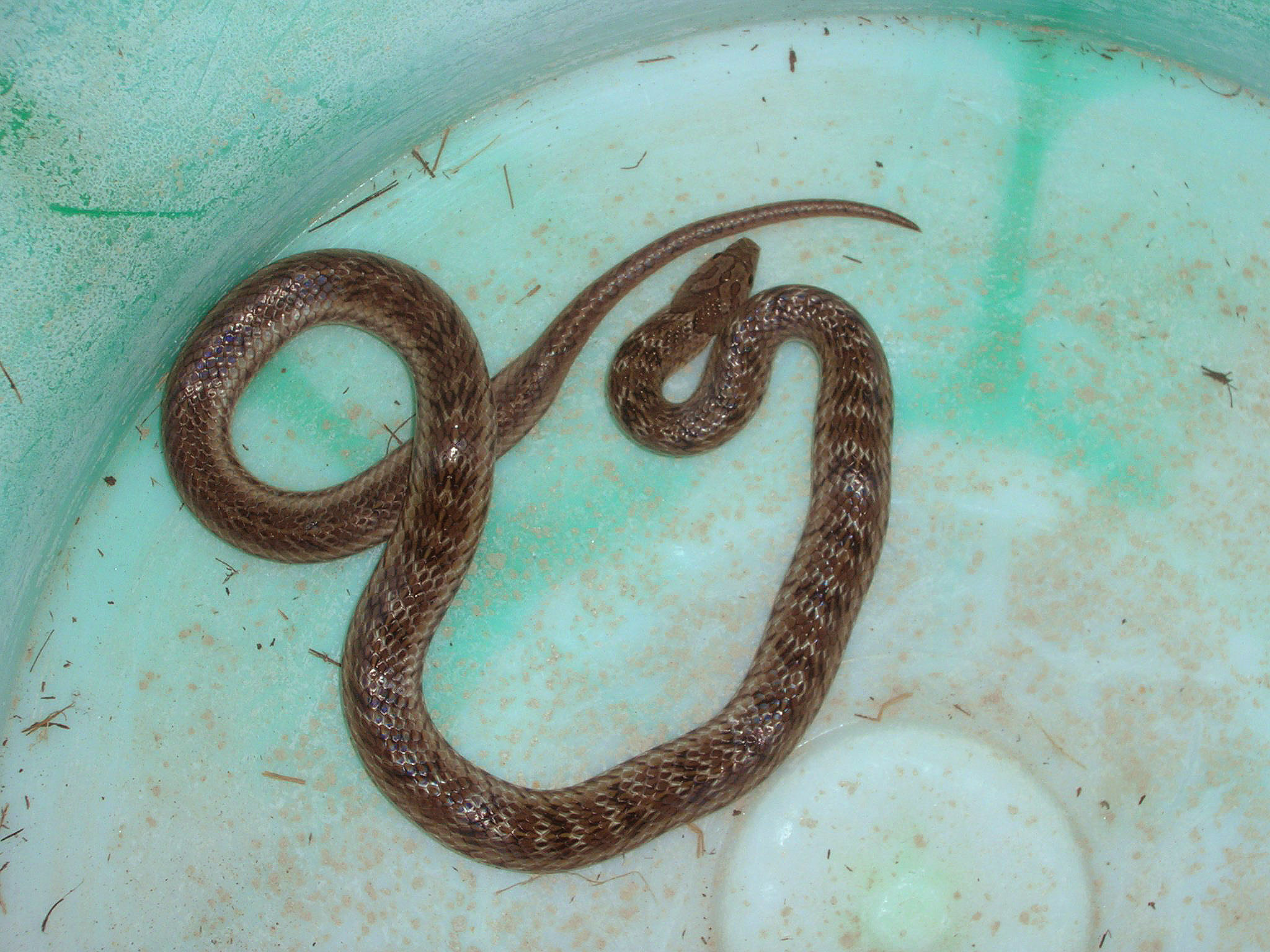
Dorsal view

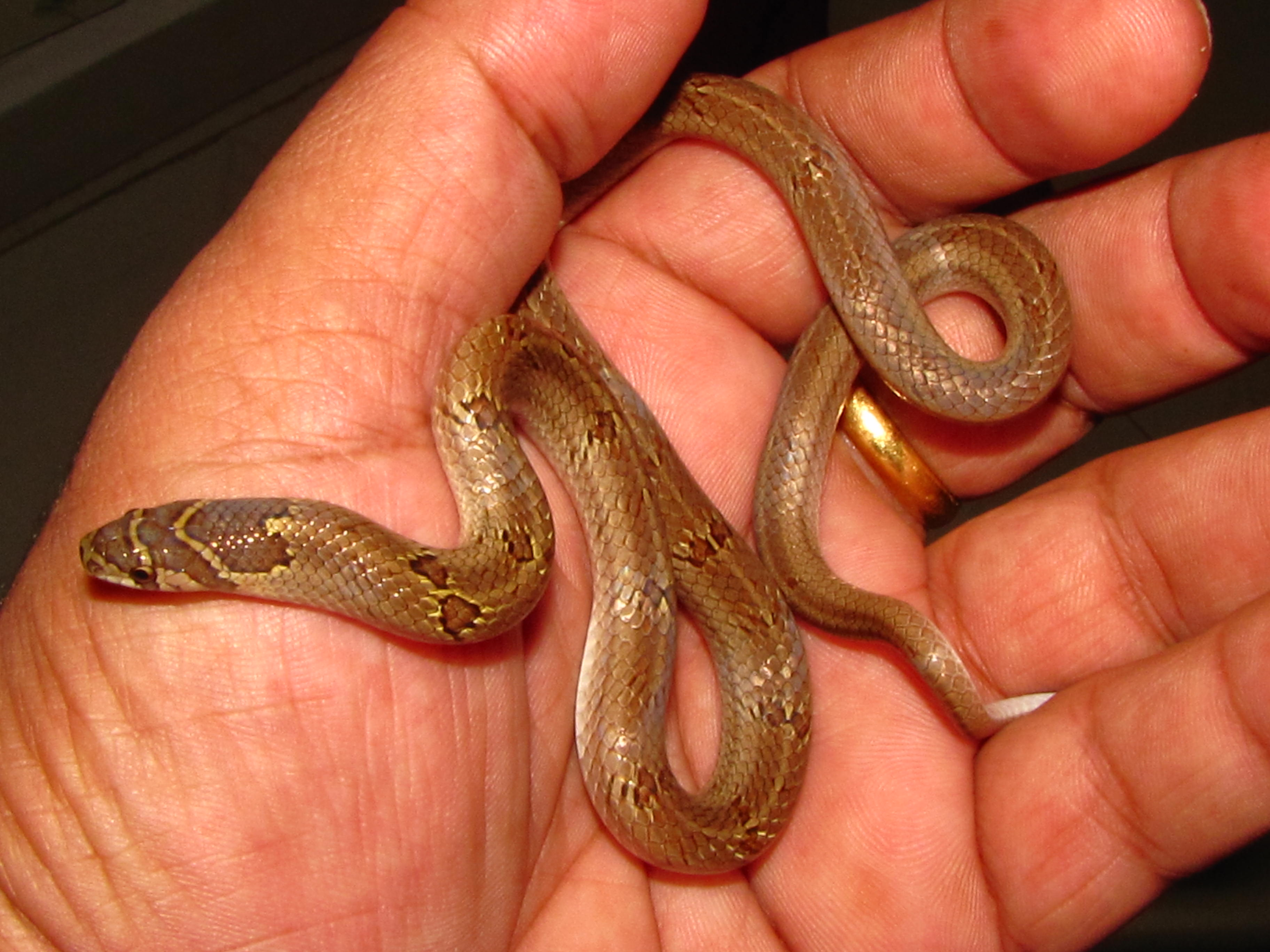
Dorsal view

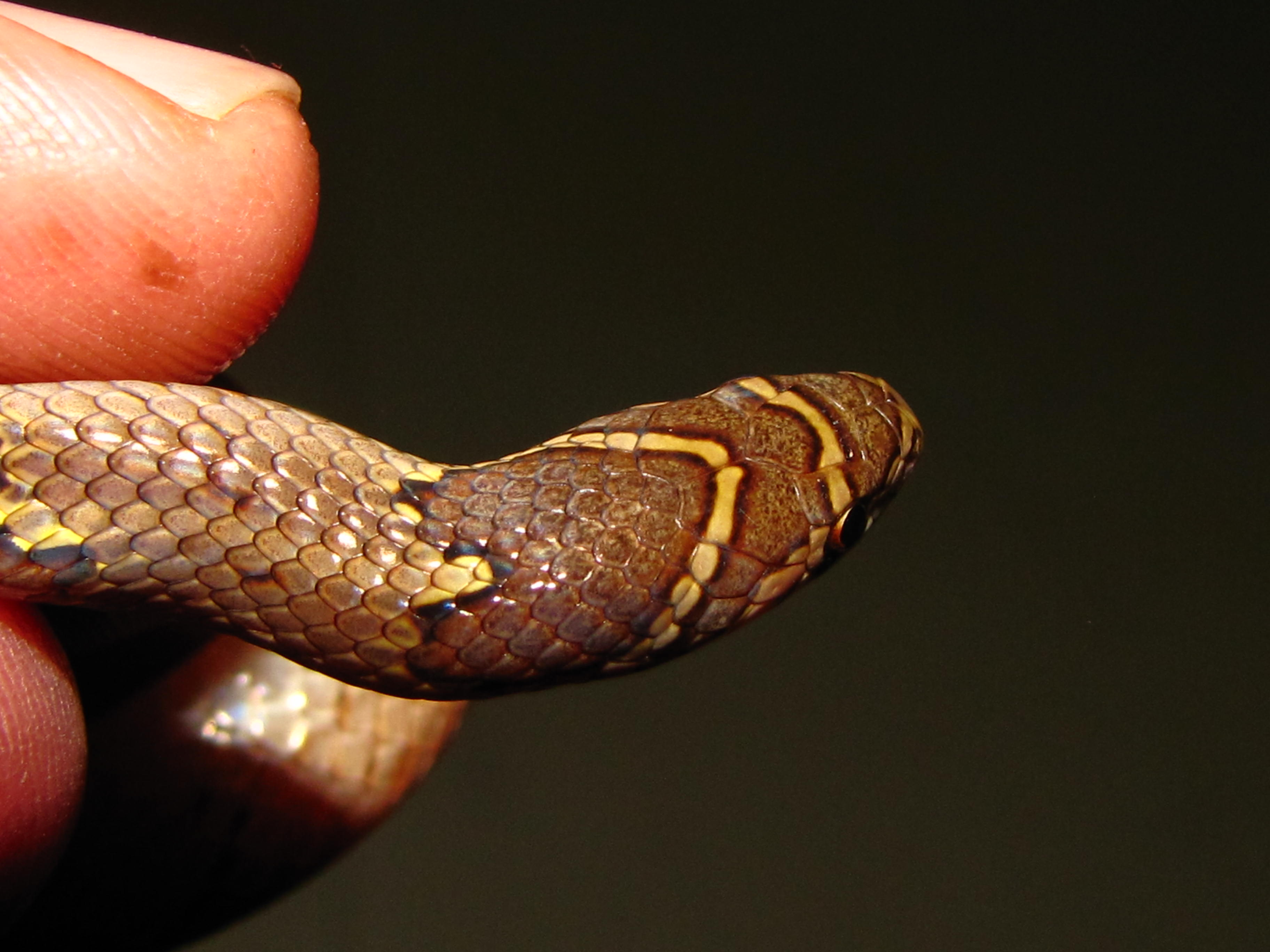
Head

===== Genus: Ptyas =====
====== Ptyas mucosa (Indian rat snake / ചേര) ======
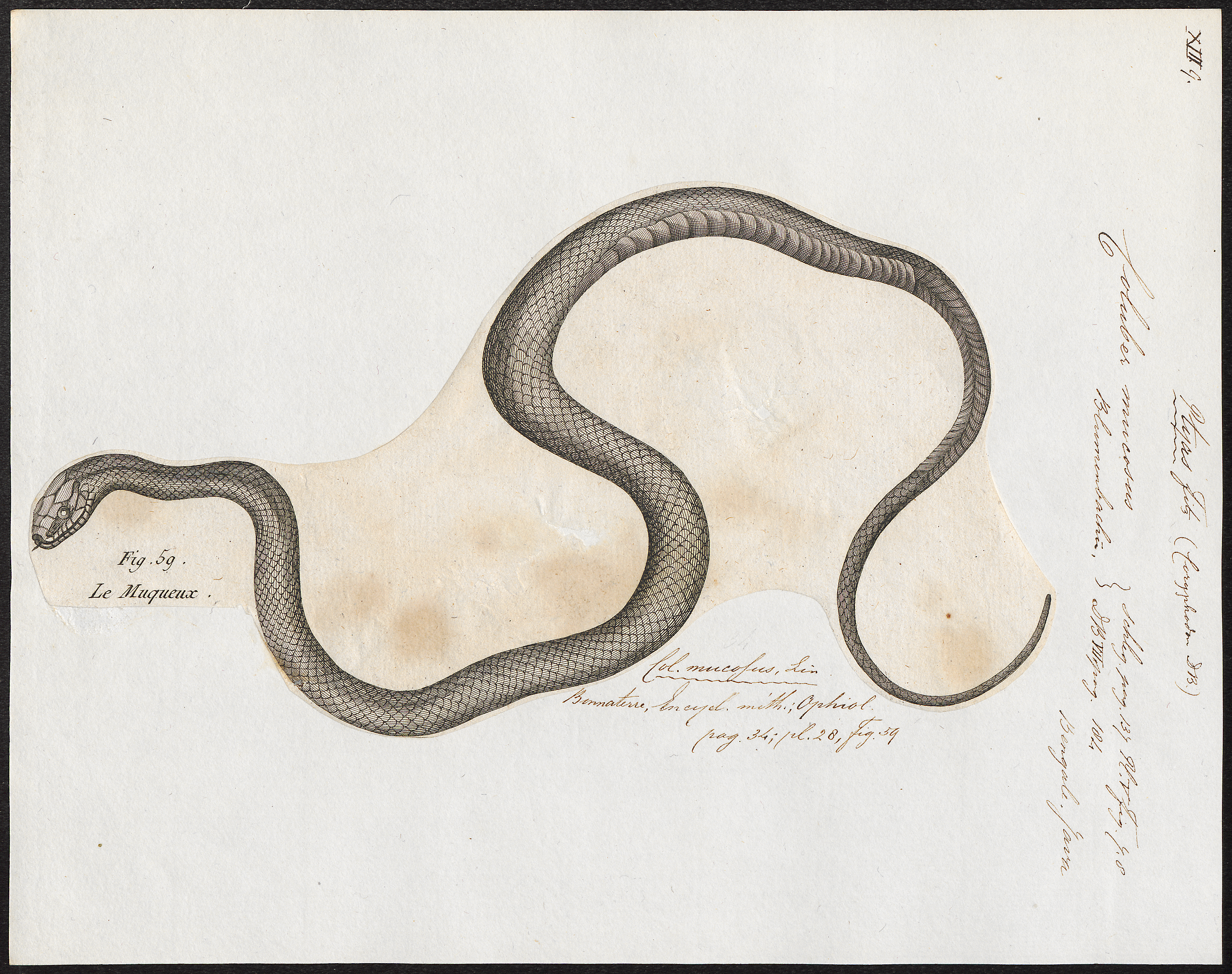
Illustration

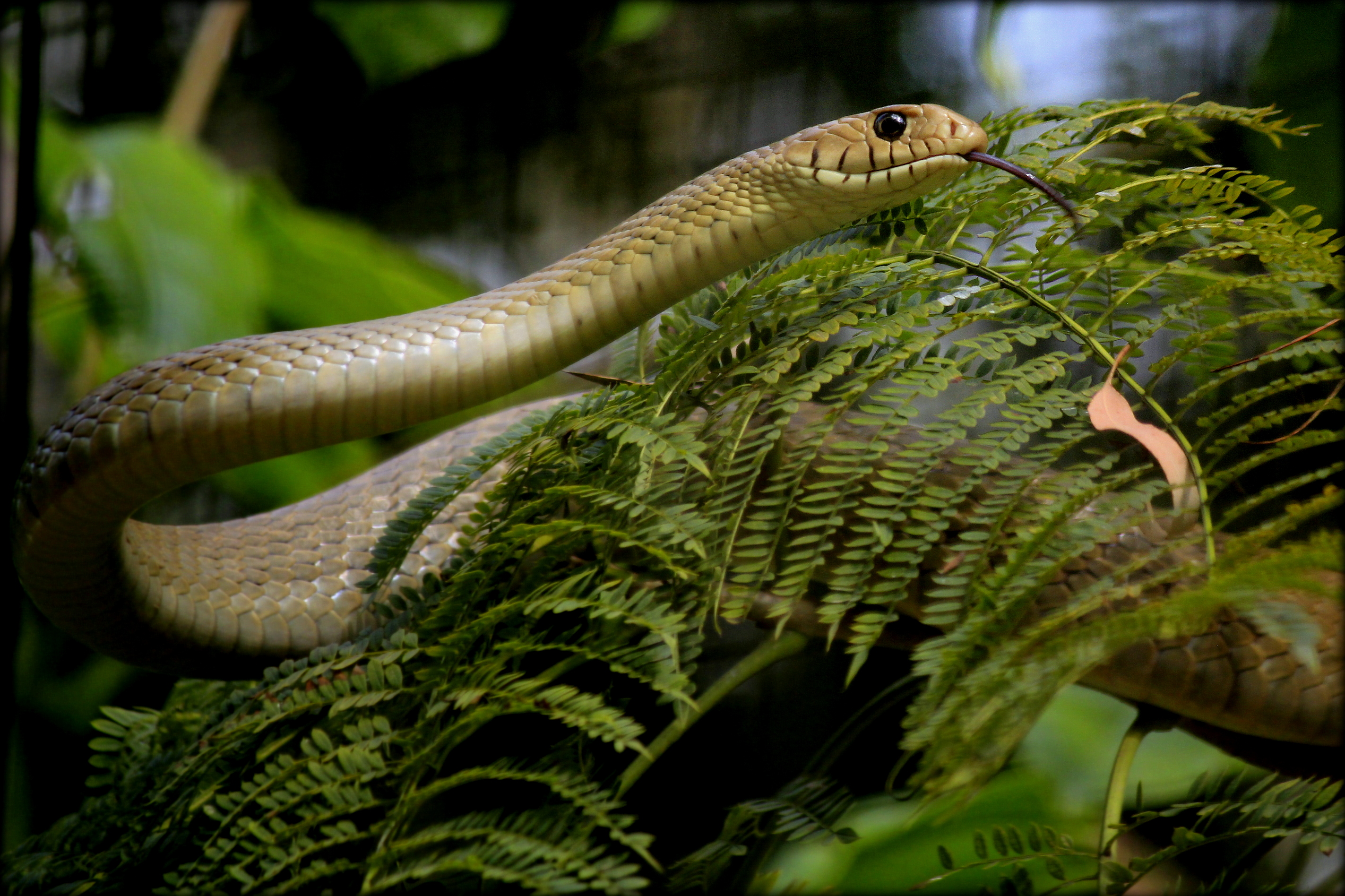
Lateral view

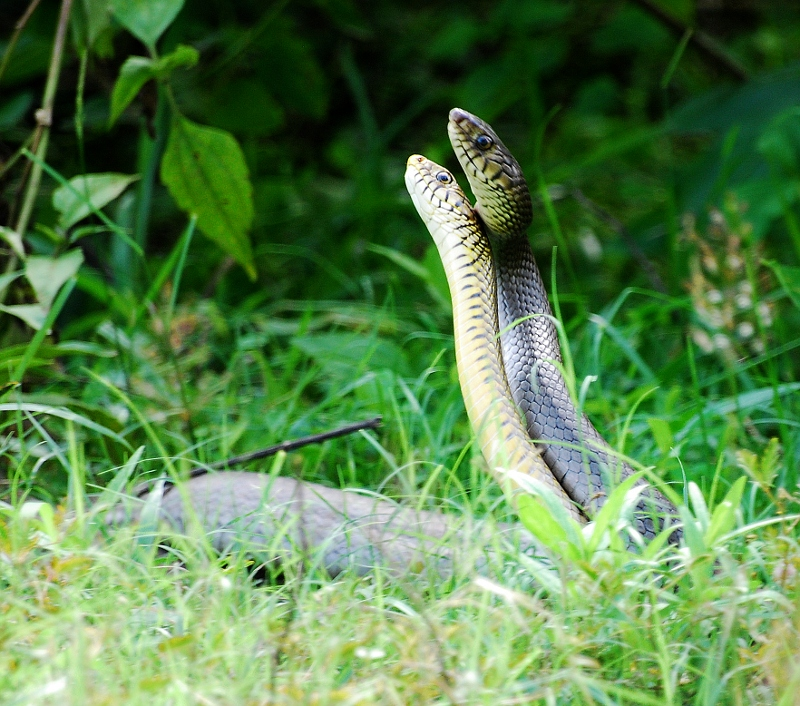
Courtship

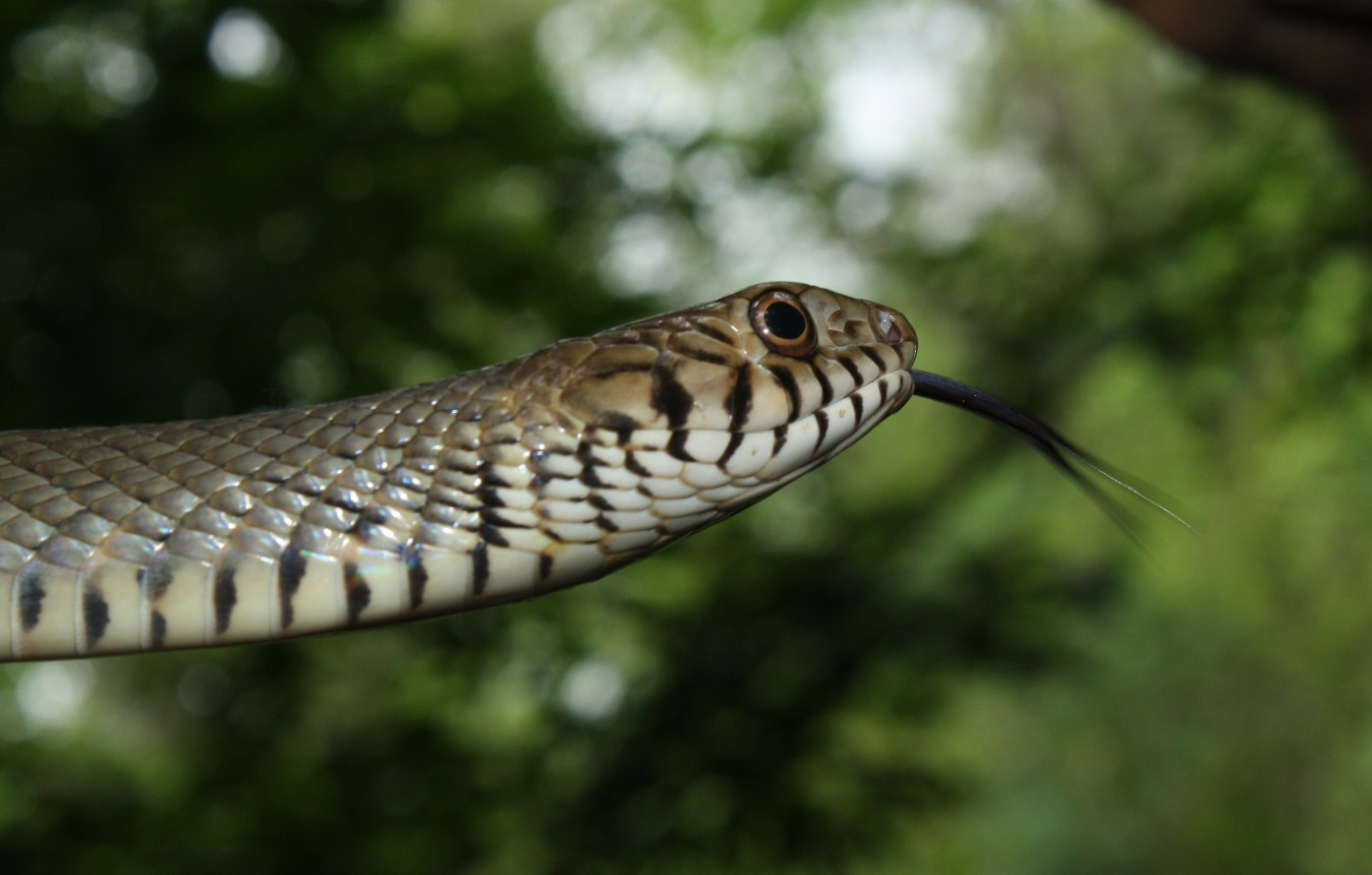
Head

===== Genus: Sibynophis =====
====== Sibynophis subpunctatus (Duméril's black-headed snake / എഴുത്താണി ചുരുട്ട) ======
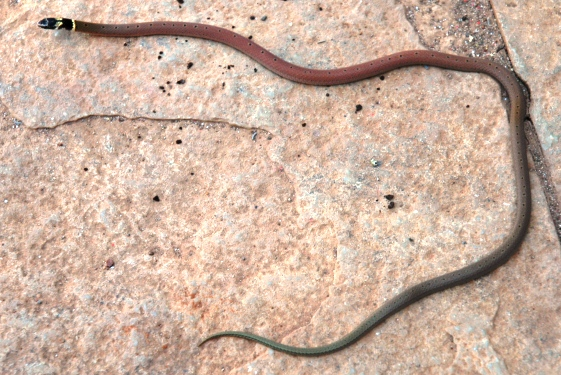
Dorsal view

==== Family: Erycidae/Erycinae (sand boas) ====
===== Genus: Eryx =====
====== Eryx conicus (Russell's boa / ഇരുതലൻ മണ്ണൂലി) ======
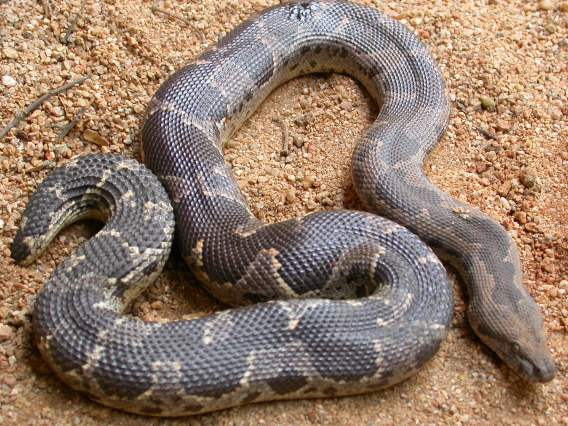
Dorsal view

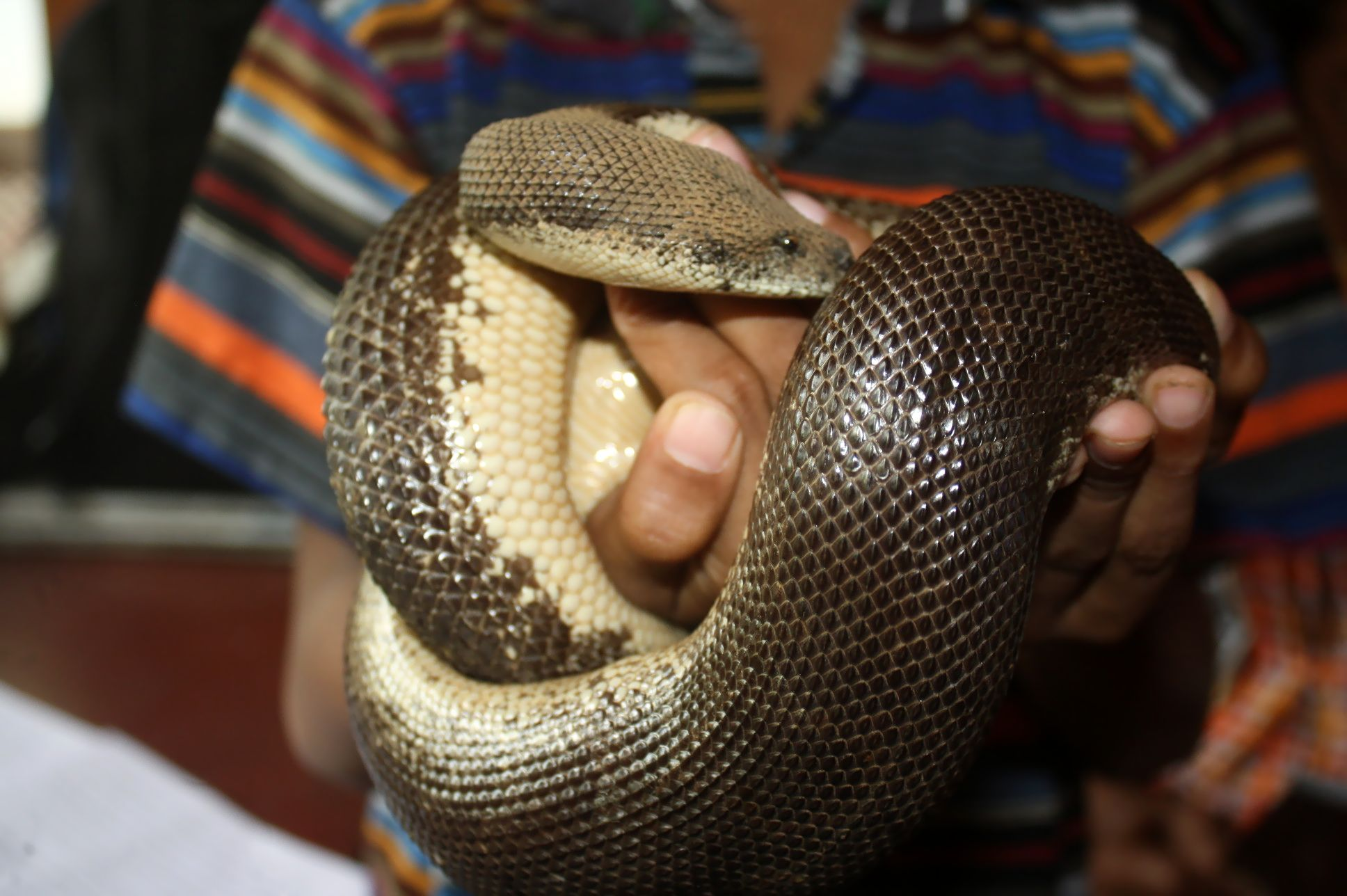

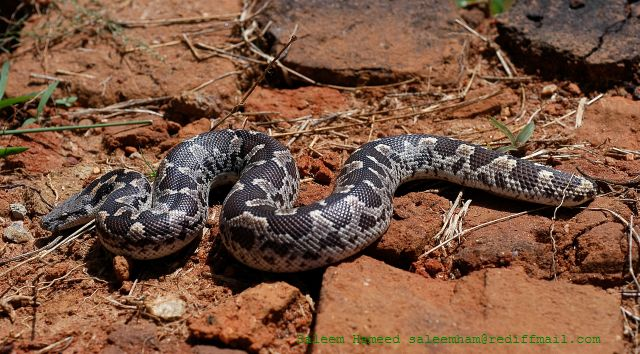
Lateral view

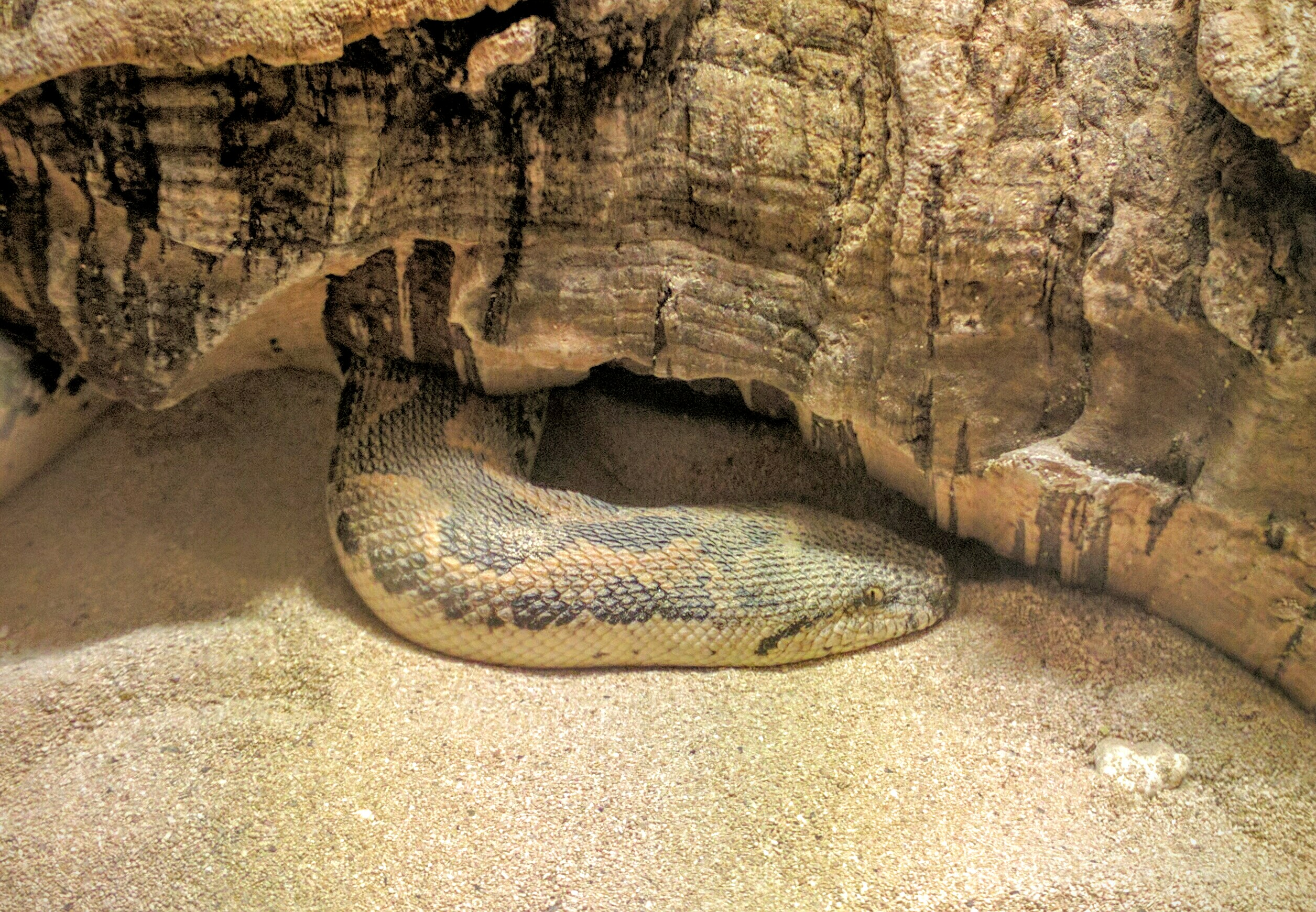
Head

====== Eryx johnii (Indian sand boa / വലിയ മണ്ണൂലി) ======
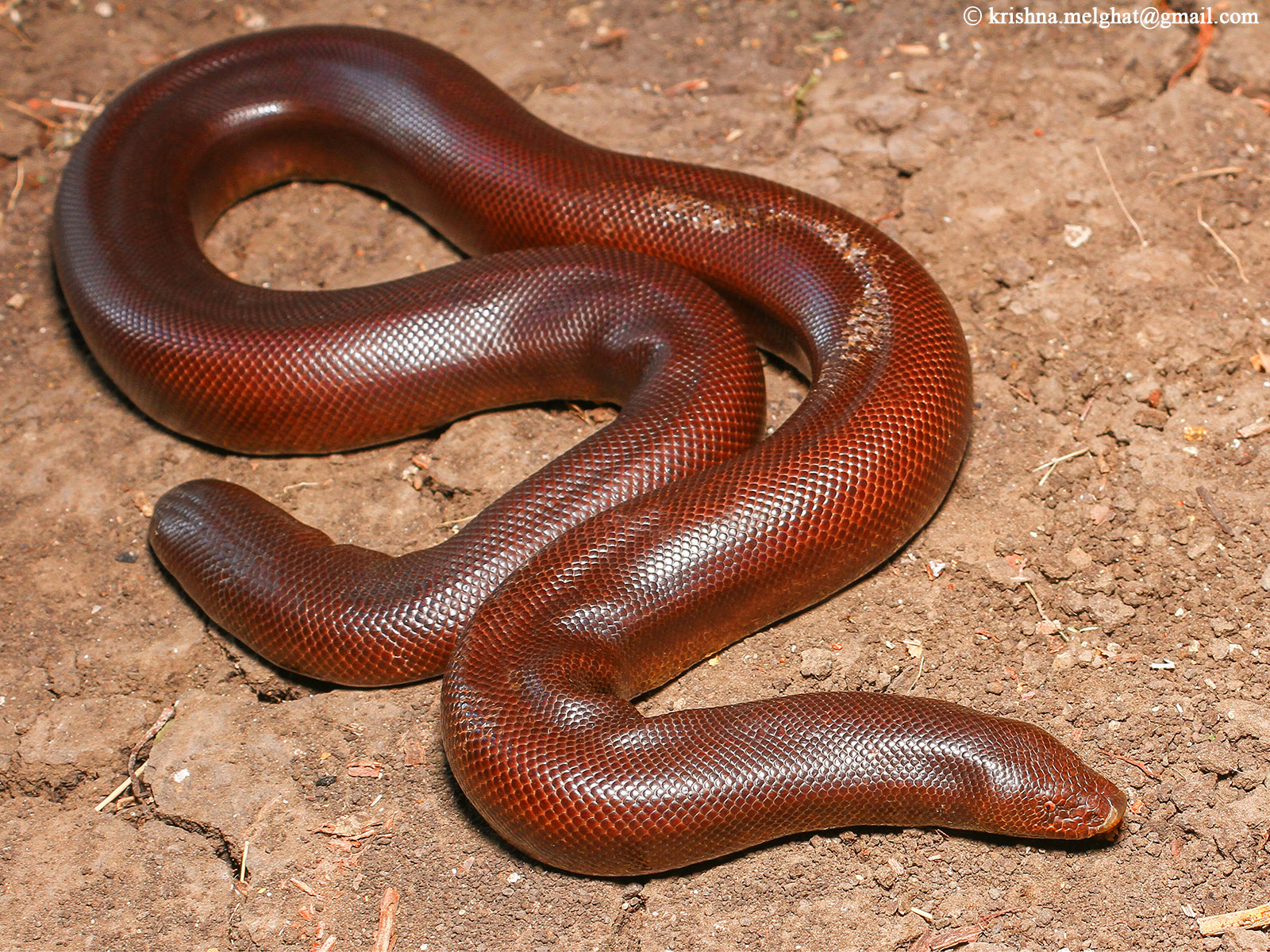
Dorsal view

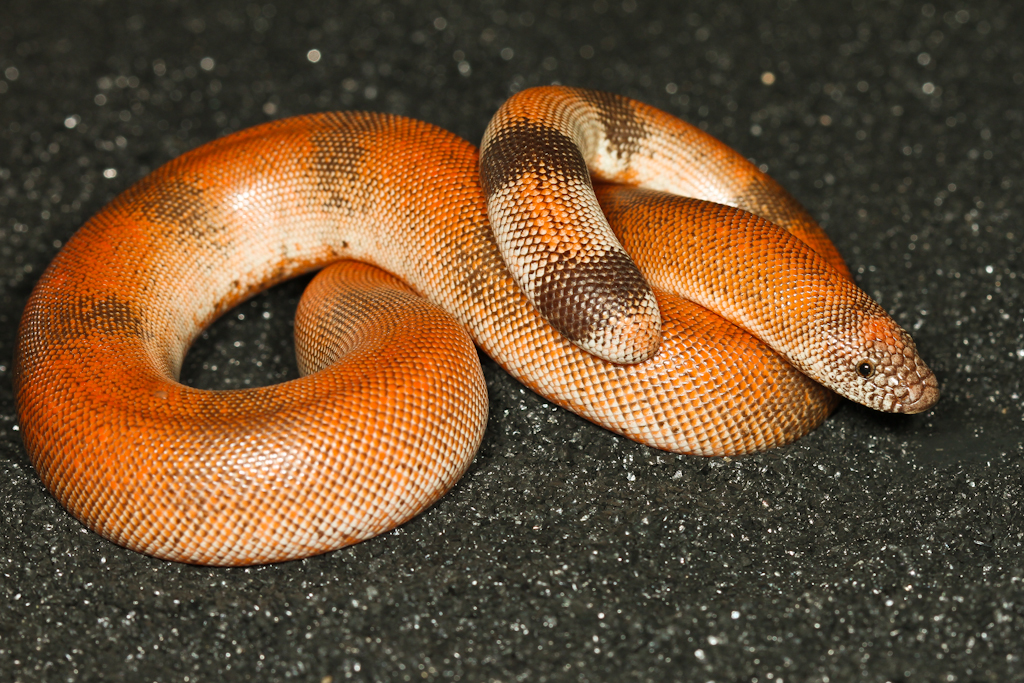
Lateral view

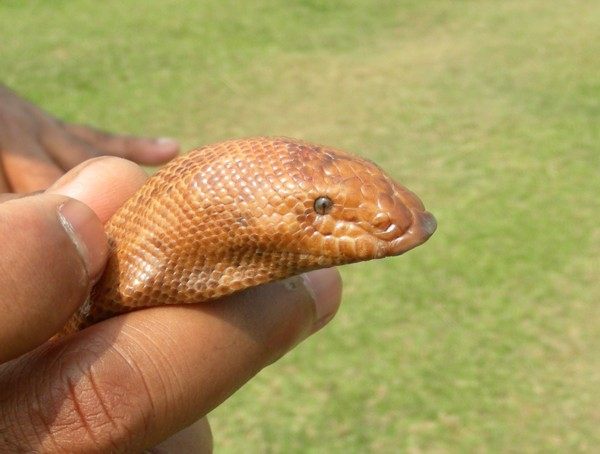
Head

====== Eryx whitakeri (Whitaker's sand boa) ======
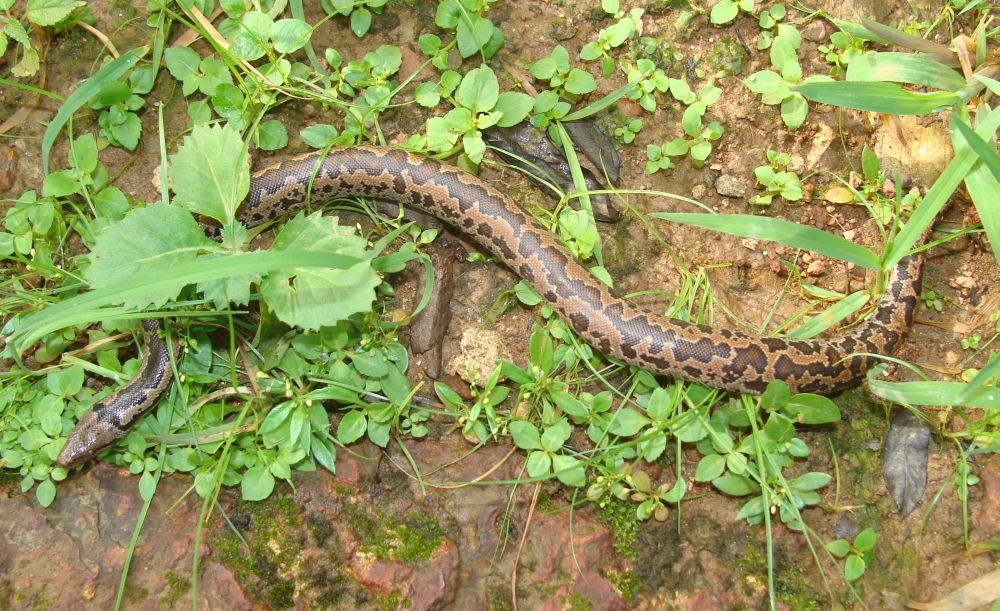
Dorsal view

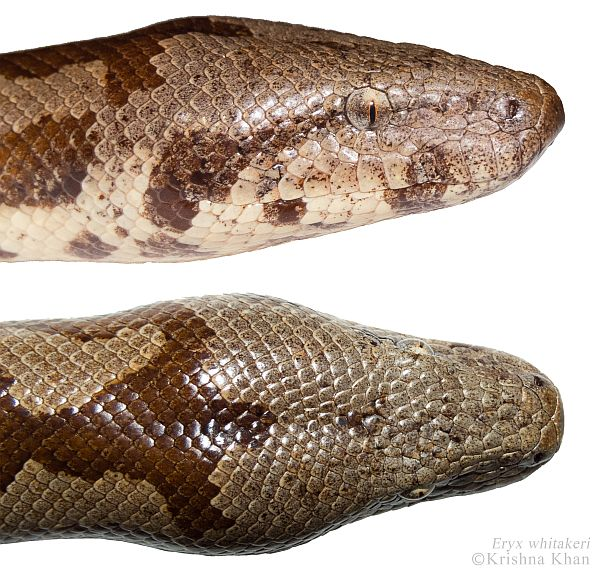
Head

==== Family: Elapidae (elapid snakes) ====
===== Genus: Bungarus =====
====== Bungarus caeruleus (common krait / വെള്ളിക്കെട്ടൻ) ======
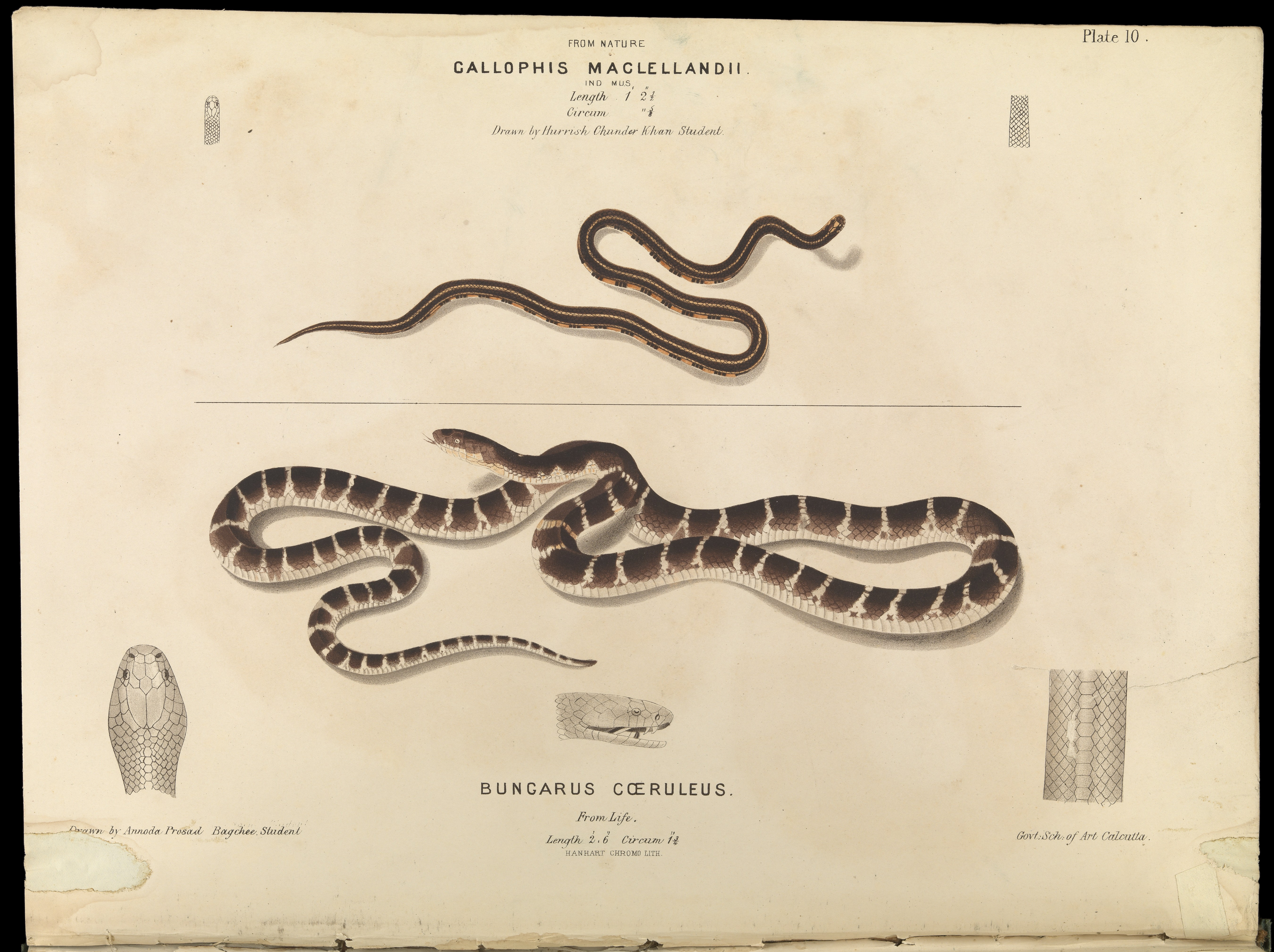
Illustration

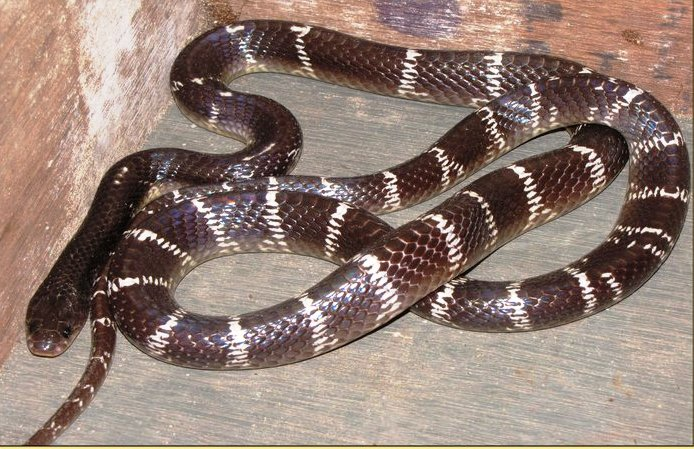
Dorsal view

===== Genus: Calliophis =====
====== Calliophis bibroni (Bibron's coral snake / എഴുത്താണി വളയൻ) ======
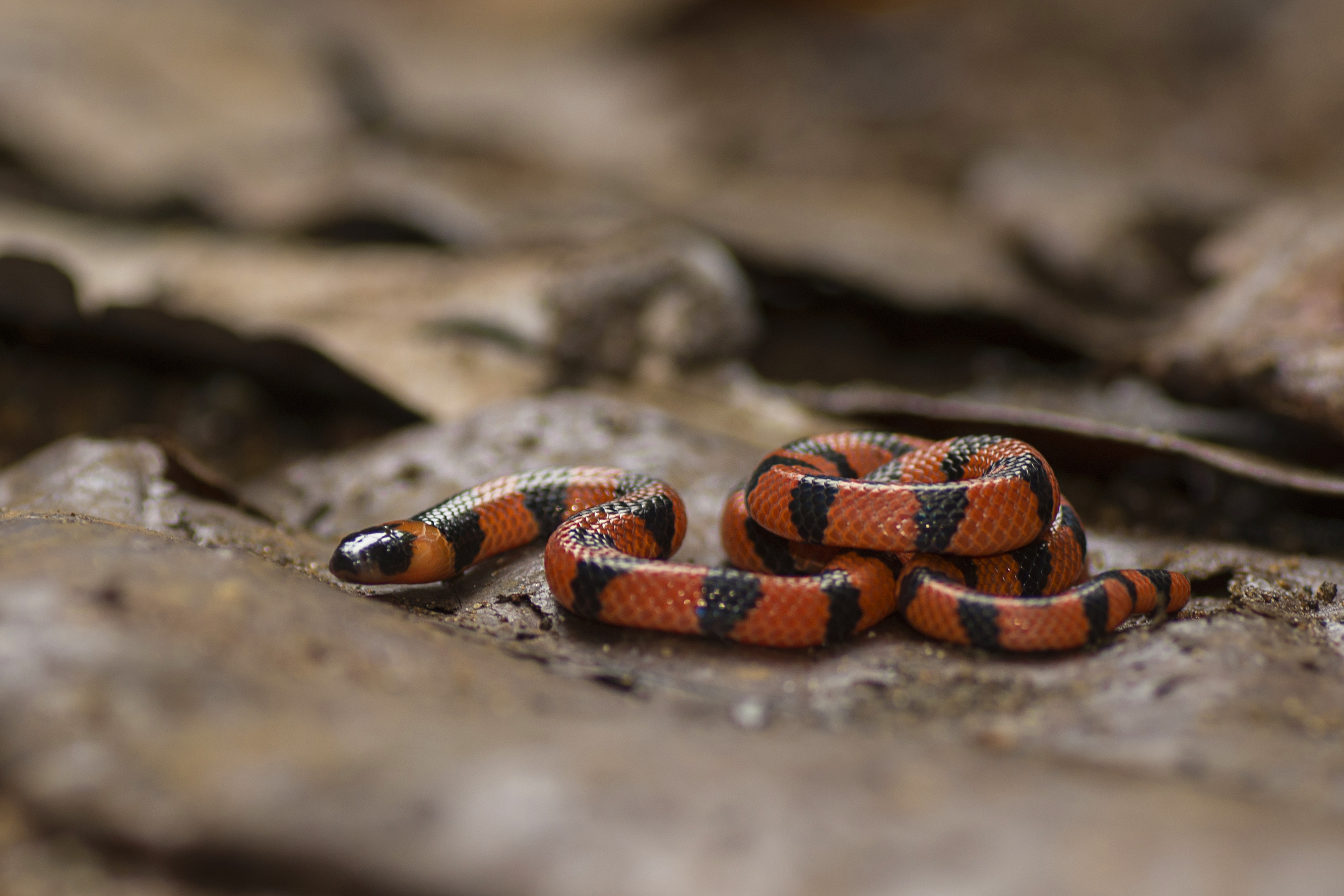
Lateral view

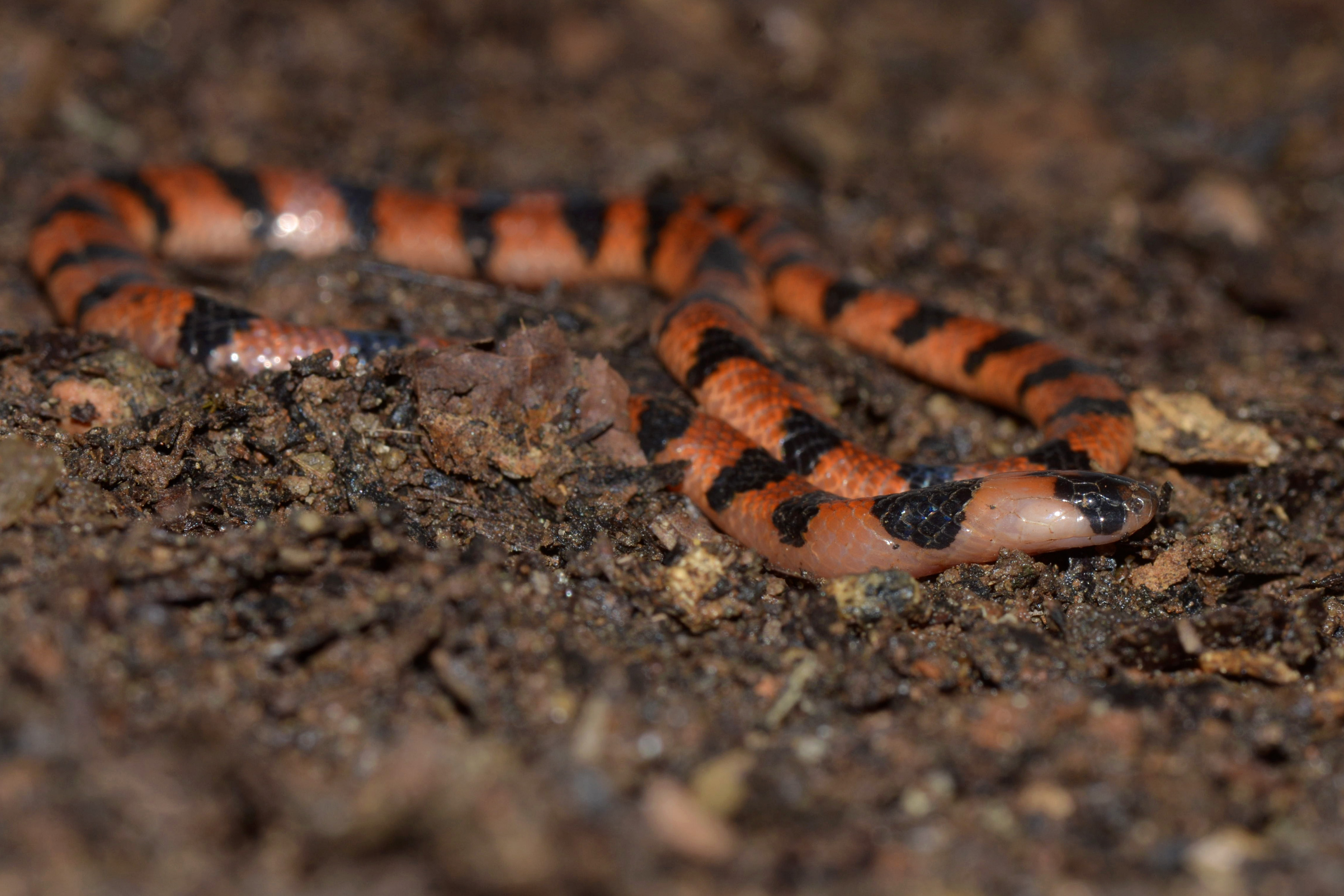
Head

====== Calliophis nigrescens (black coral snake / ഇരുളൻ പവിഴപ്പാമ്പ്) ======
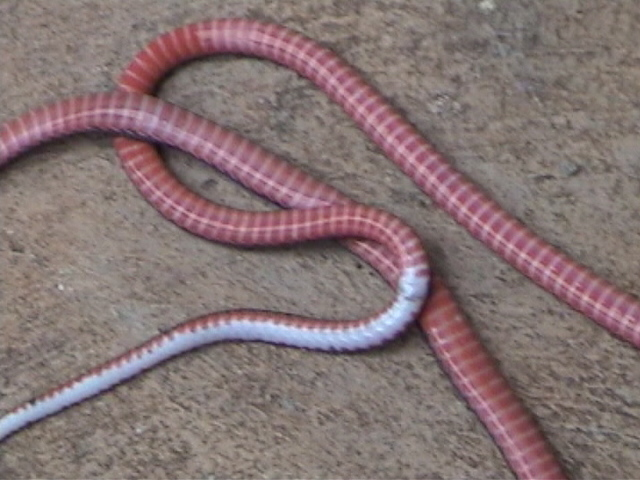
Ventral view

===== Genus: Hydrophis =====
====== Hydrophis cyanocinctus (annulated sea snake / നീലവരയൻ) ======
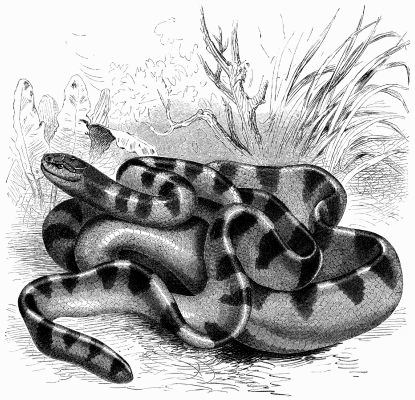
Illustration

====== Hydrophis ornatus (ornate reef sea snake / ചിറ്റുളിപ്പാമ്പ്) ======
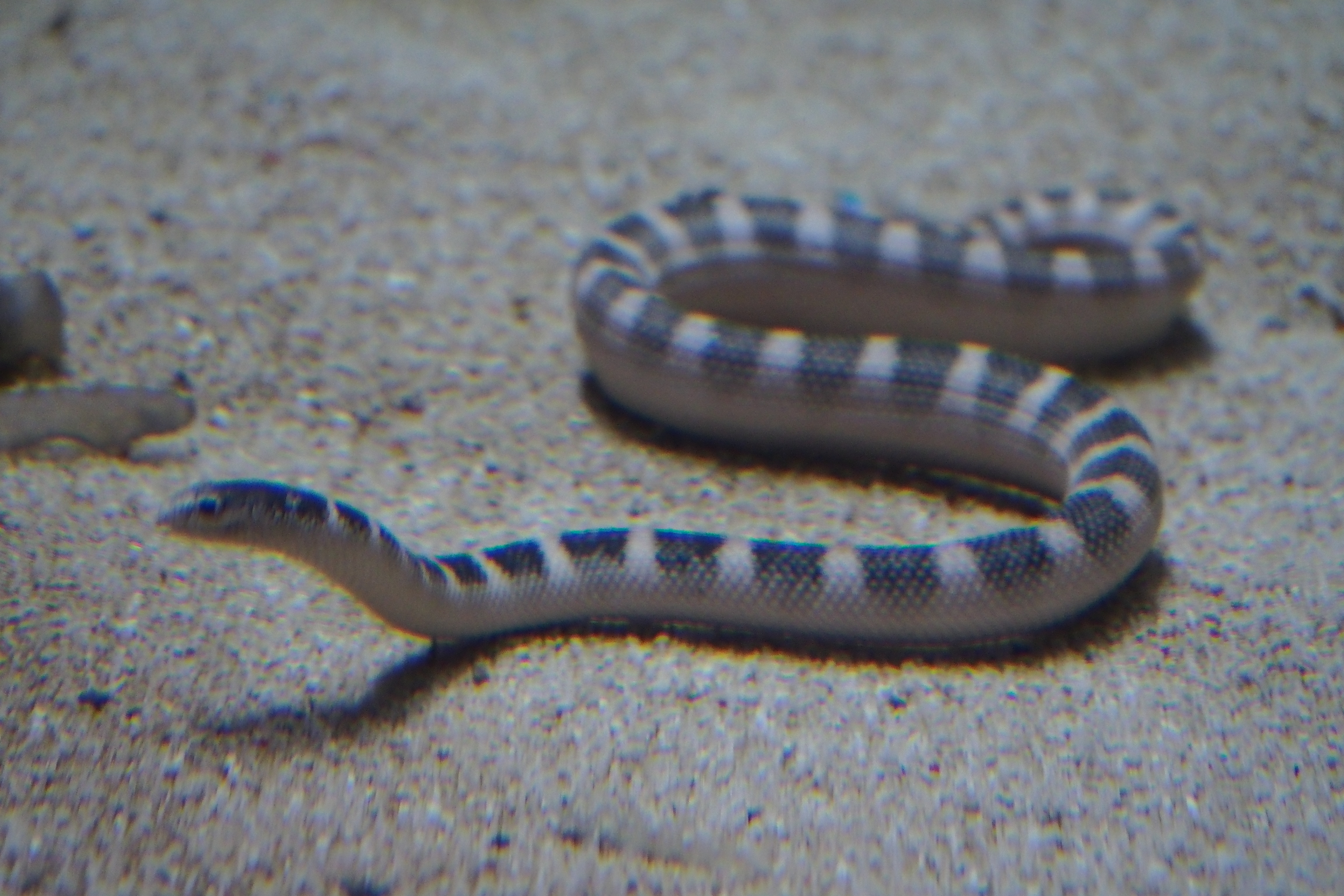

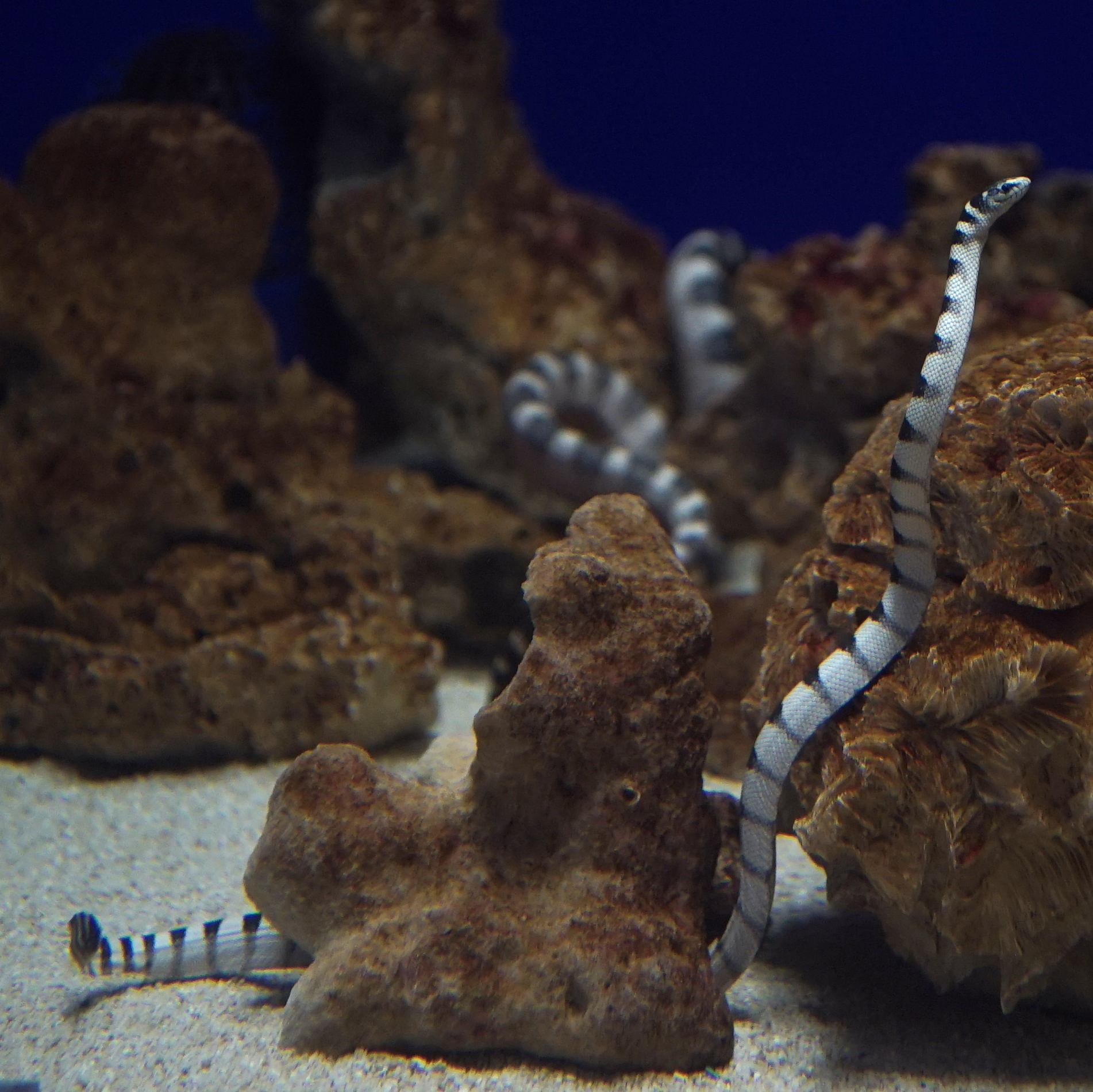

====== Hydrophis platurus (yellow-bellied sea snake / മഞ്ഞക്കറുപ്പൻ പാമ്പ്) ======
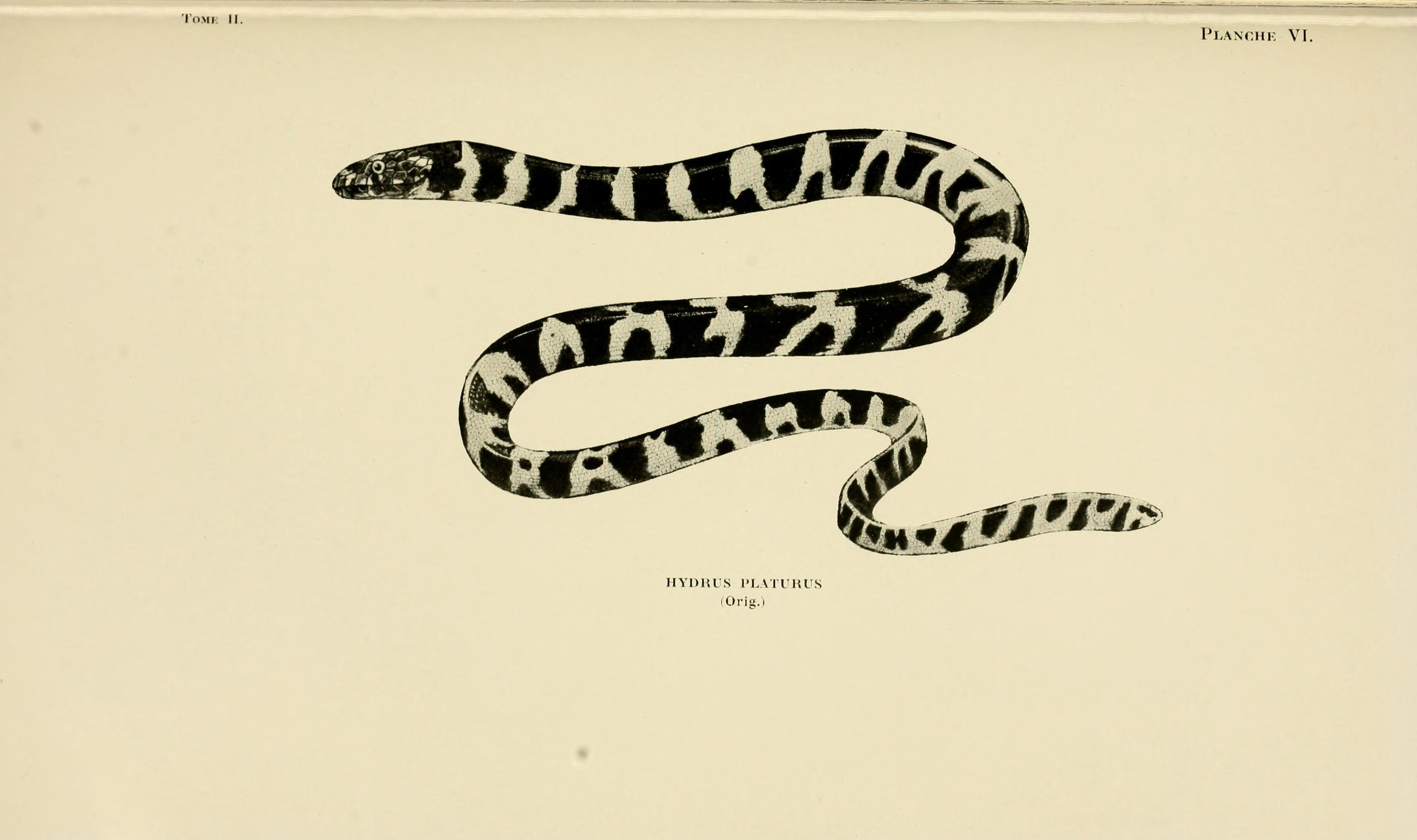
Illustration

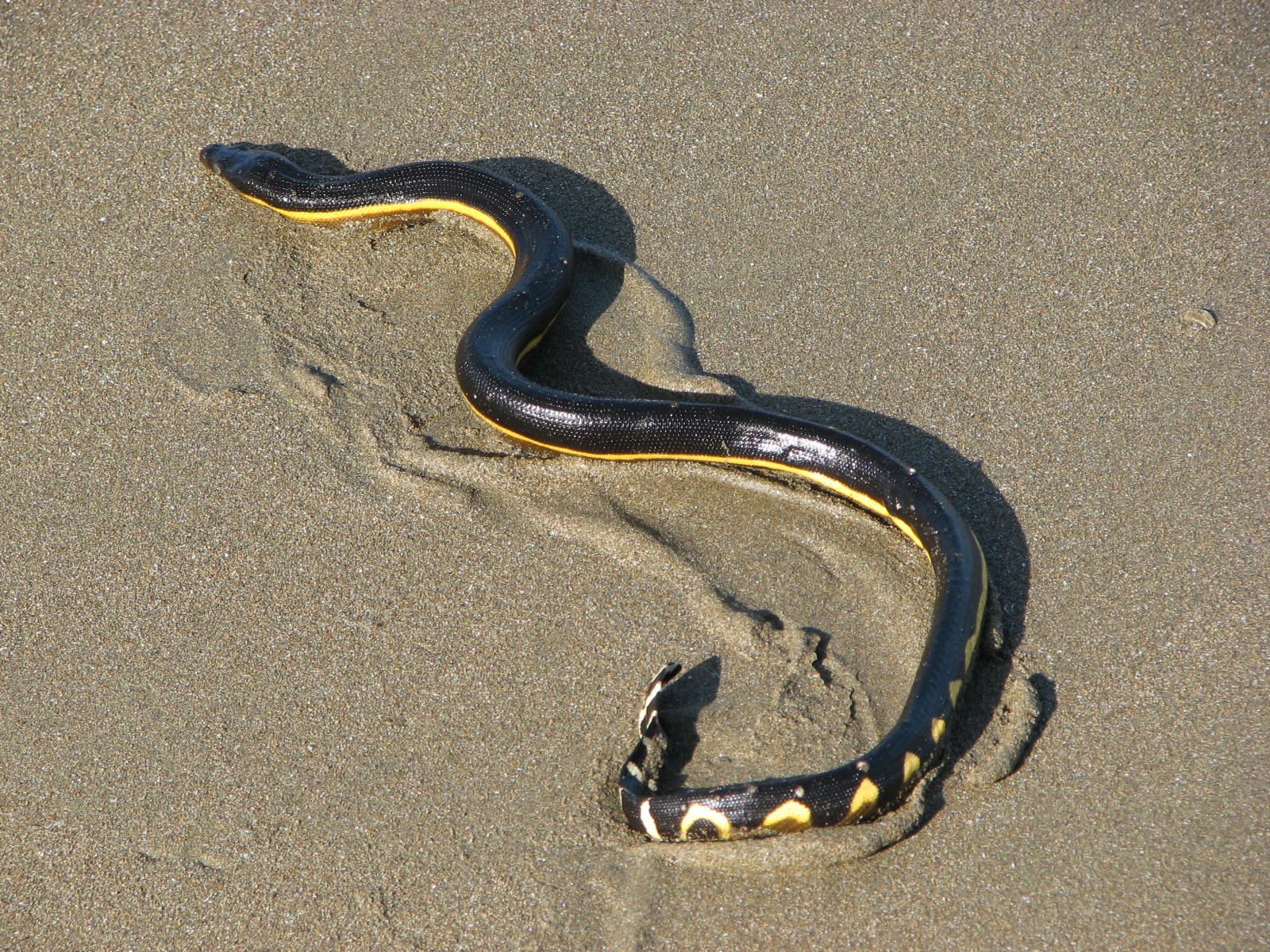
Dorsal view

====== Hydrophis schistosus (hook-nosed sea snake / വലകടിയൻ കടൽപാമ്പ്) ======
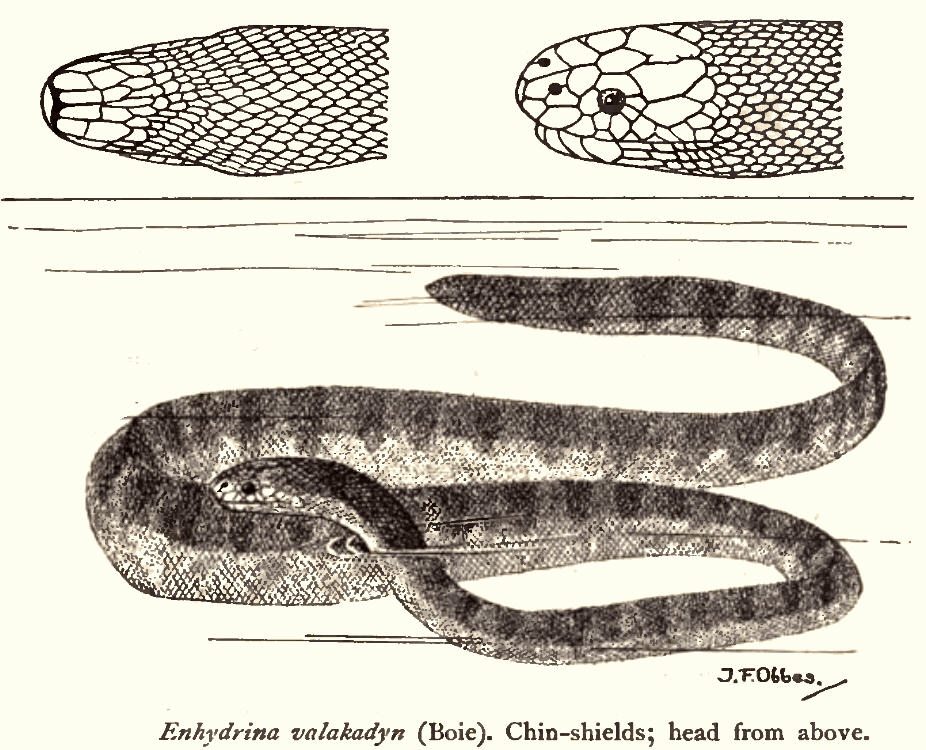
Illustration

===== Genus: Naja =====
====== Naja naja (Indian cobra / ഇന്ത്യൻ മൂർഖൻ) ======
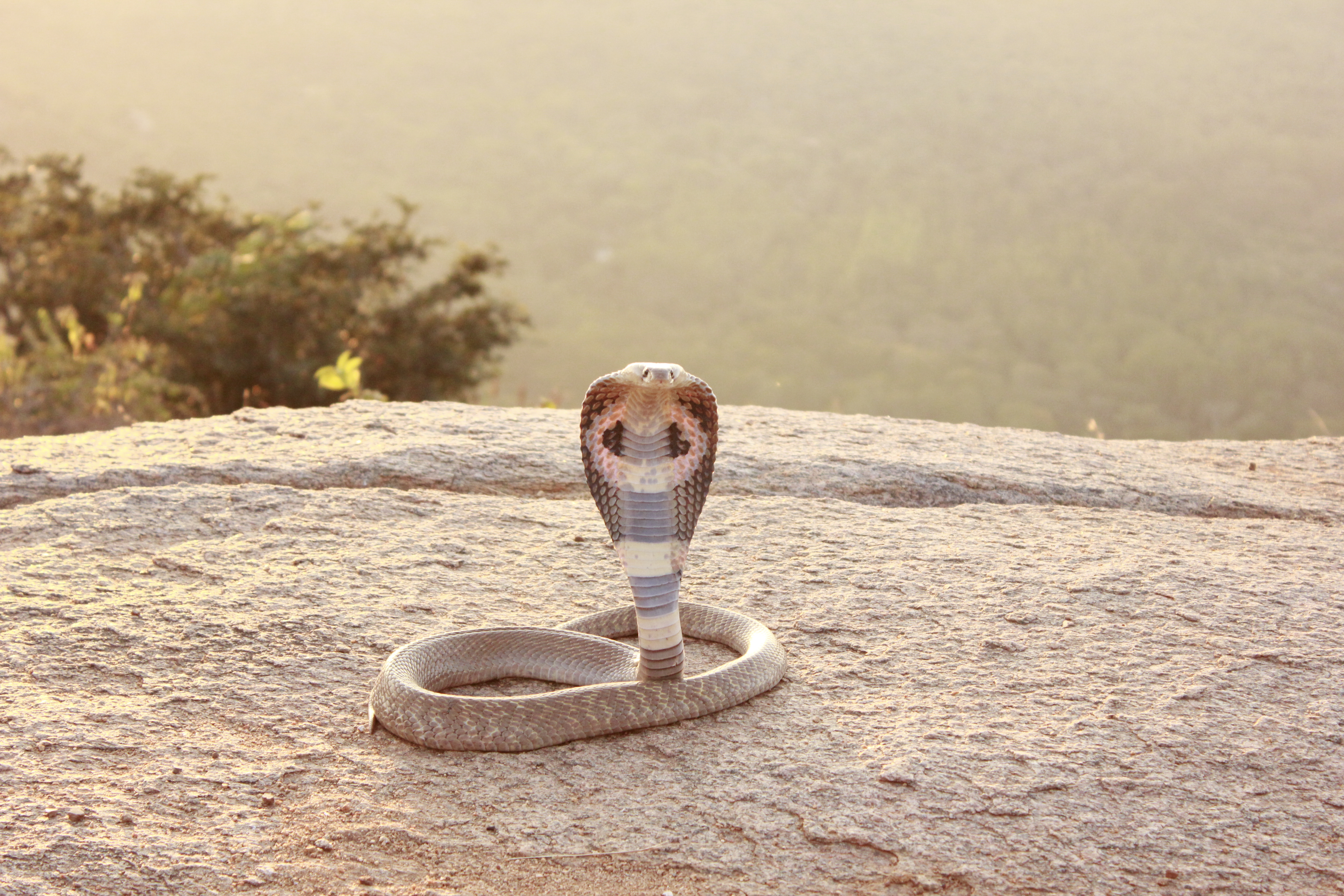

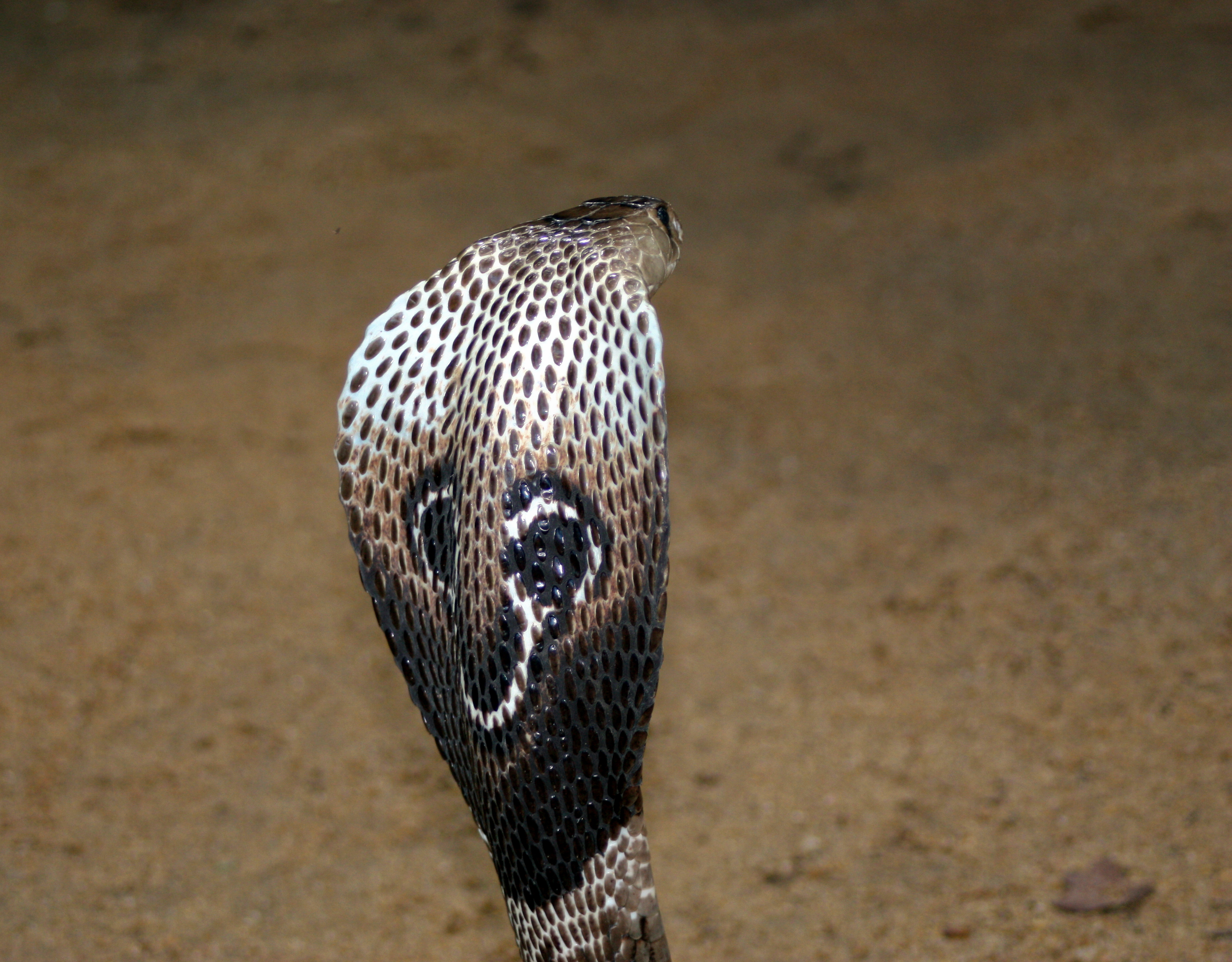
Head

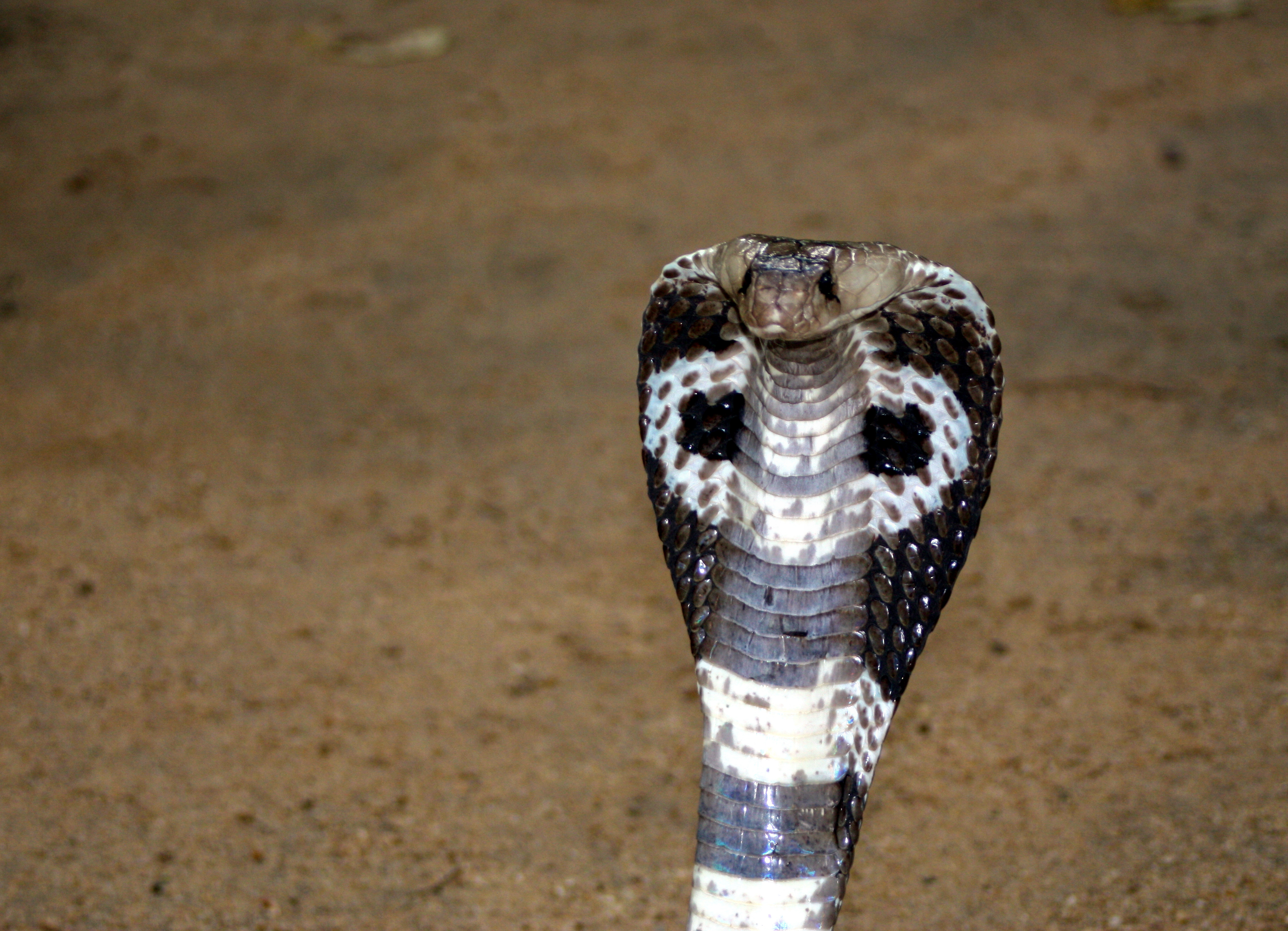
Head

===== Genus: Ophiophagus =====
====== Ophiophagus hannah (king cobra / രാജവെമ്പാല) ======
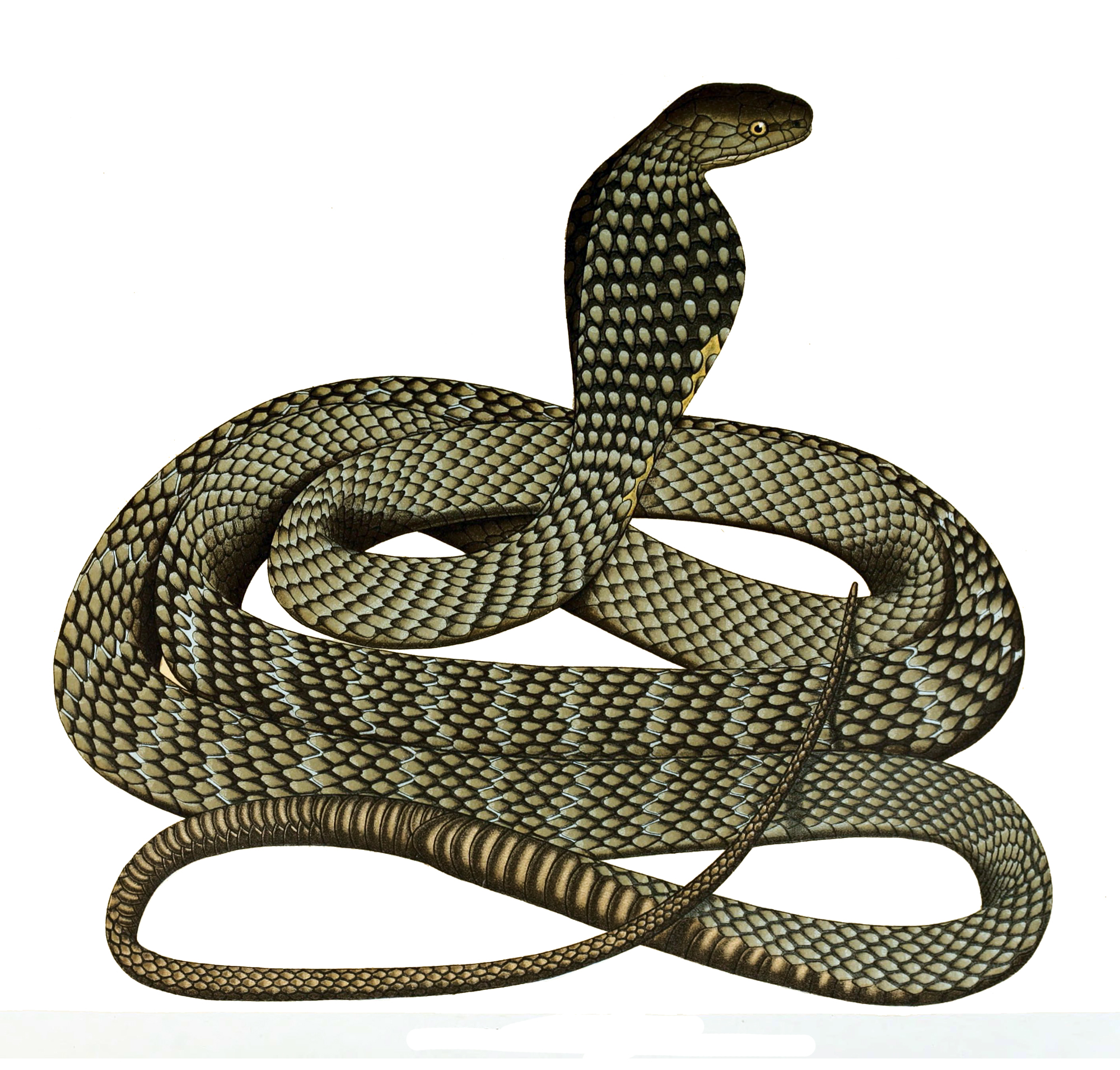
Illustration

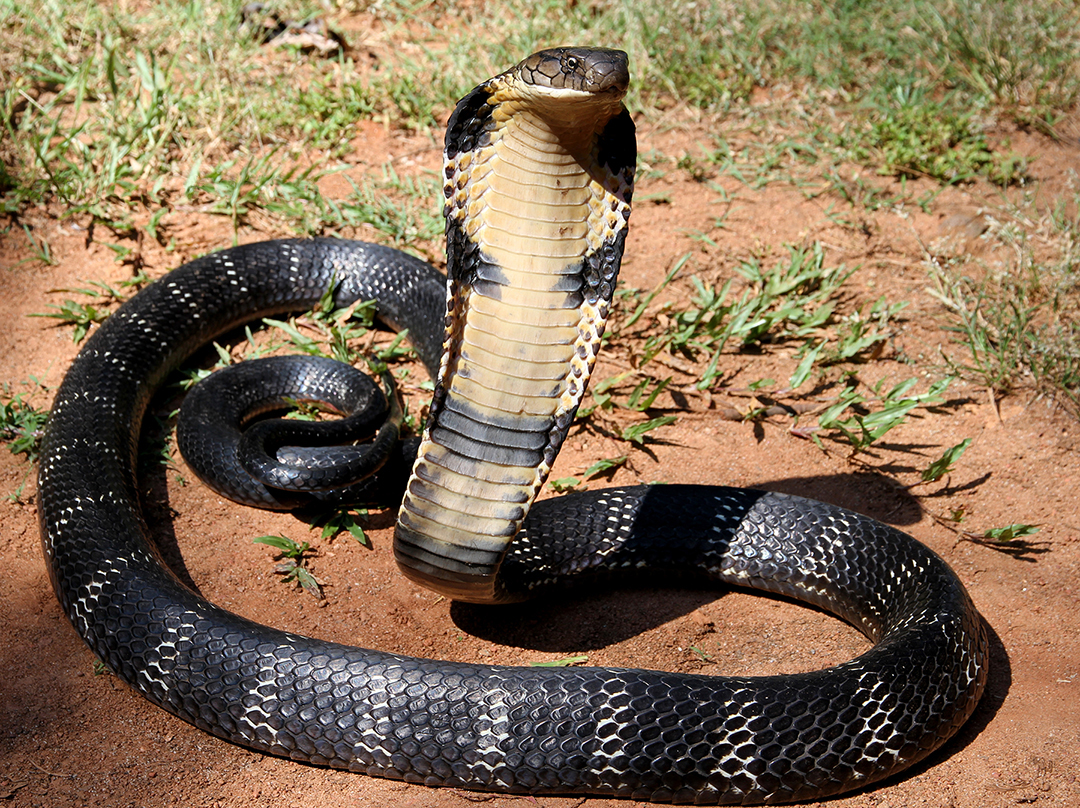

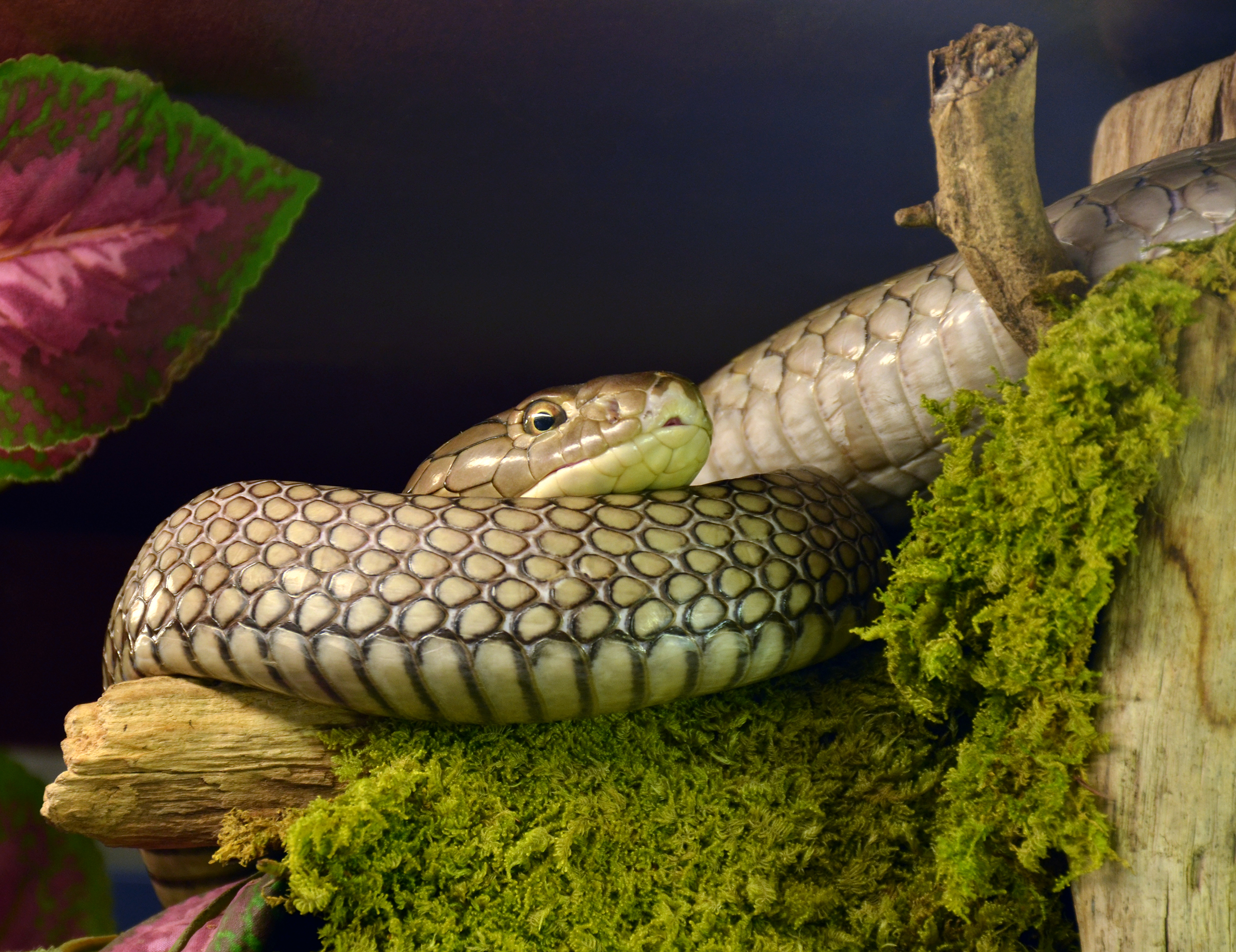

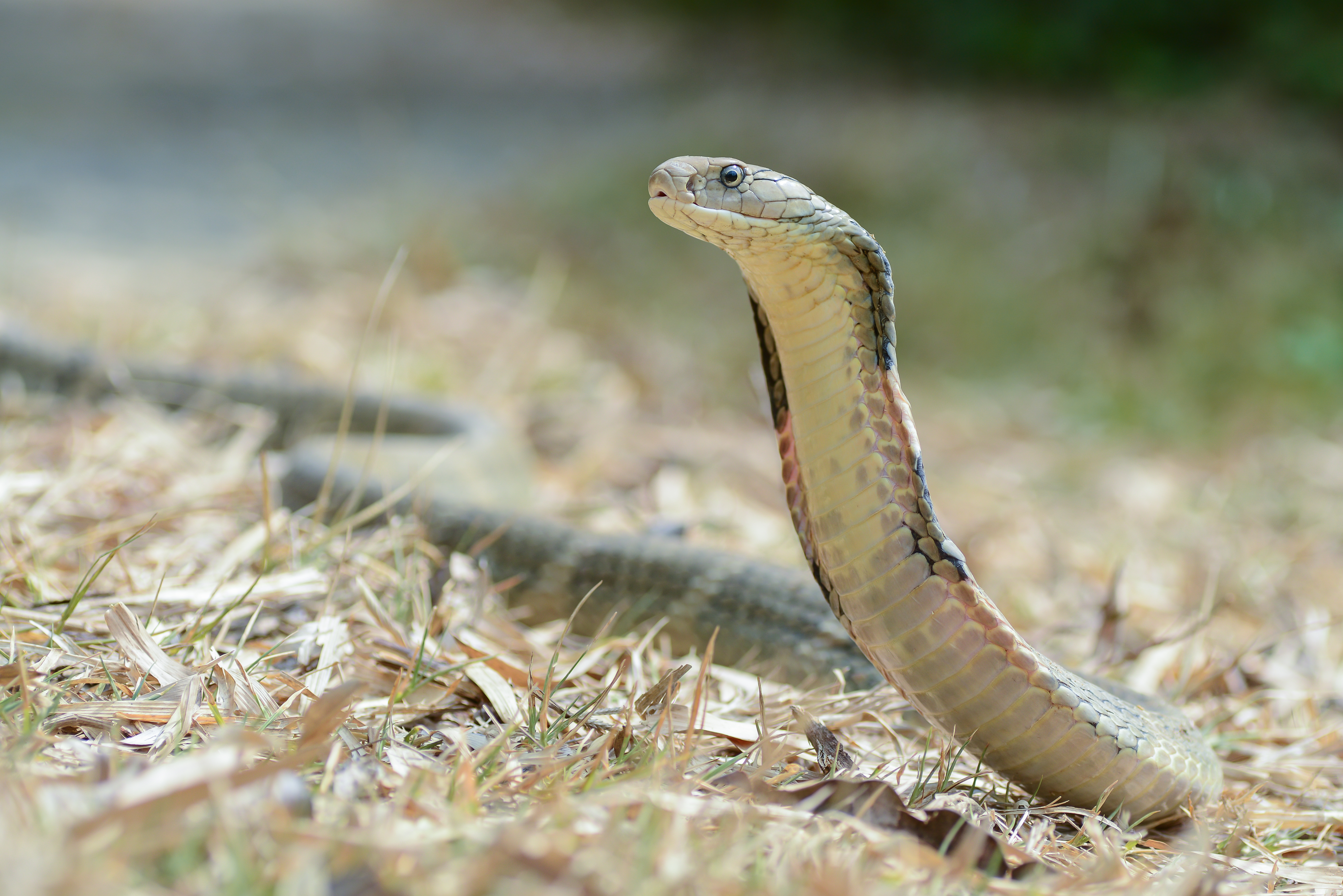
Head

==== Family: Homalopsidae (mud snakes) ====
===== Genus: Cerberus =====
====== Cerberus rynchops (dog-faced water snake / ആറ്റുവായ്പ്പാമ്പ്) ======
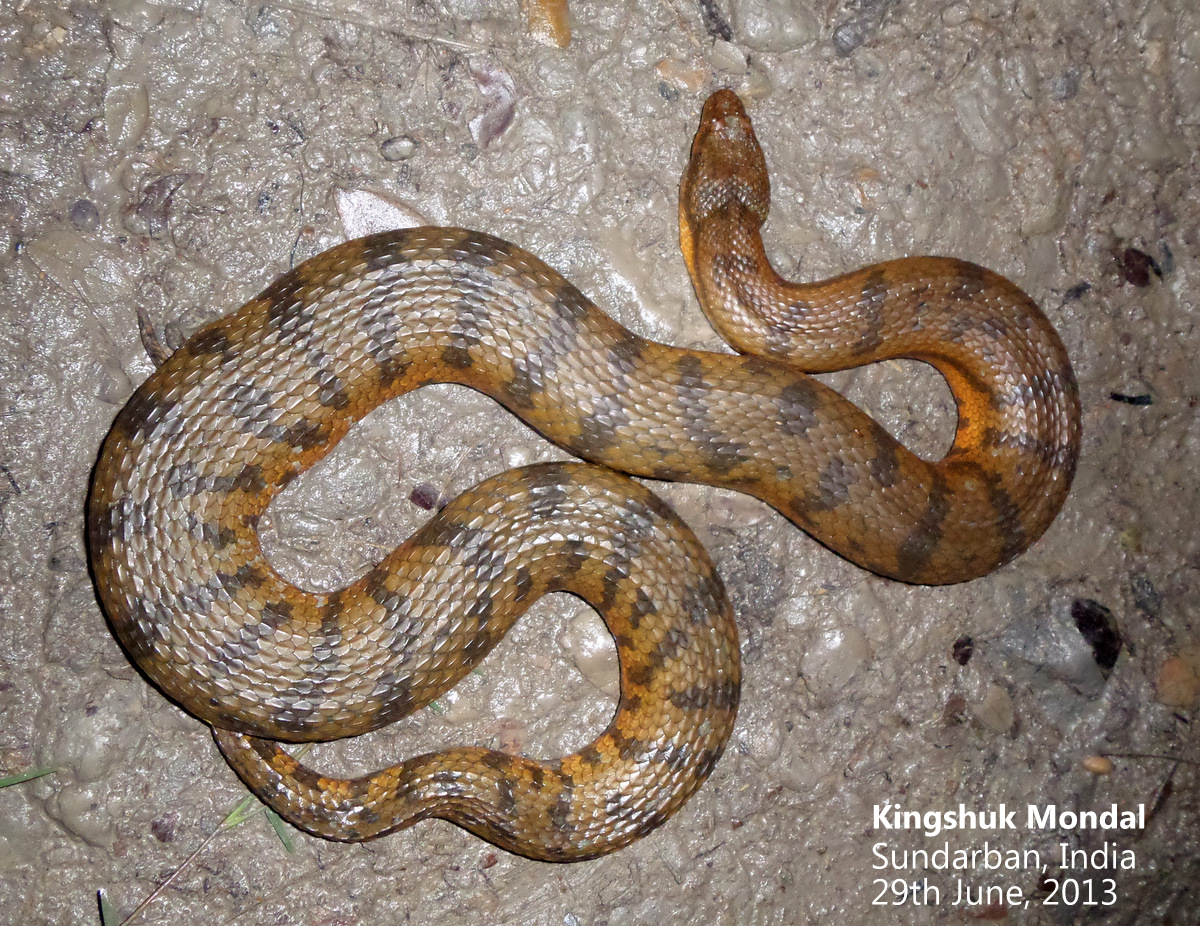
Dorsal view

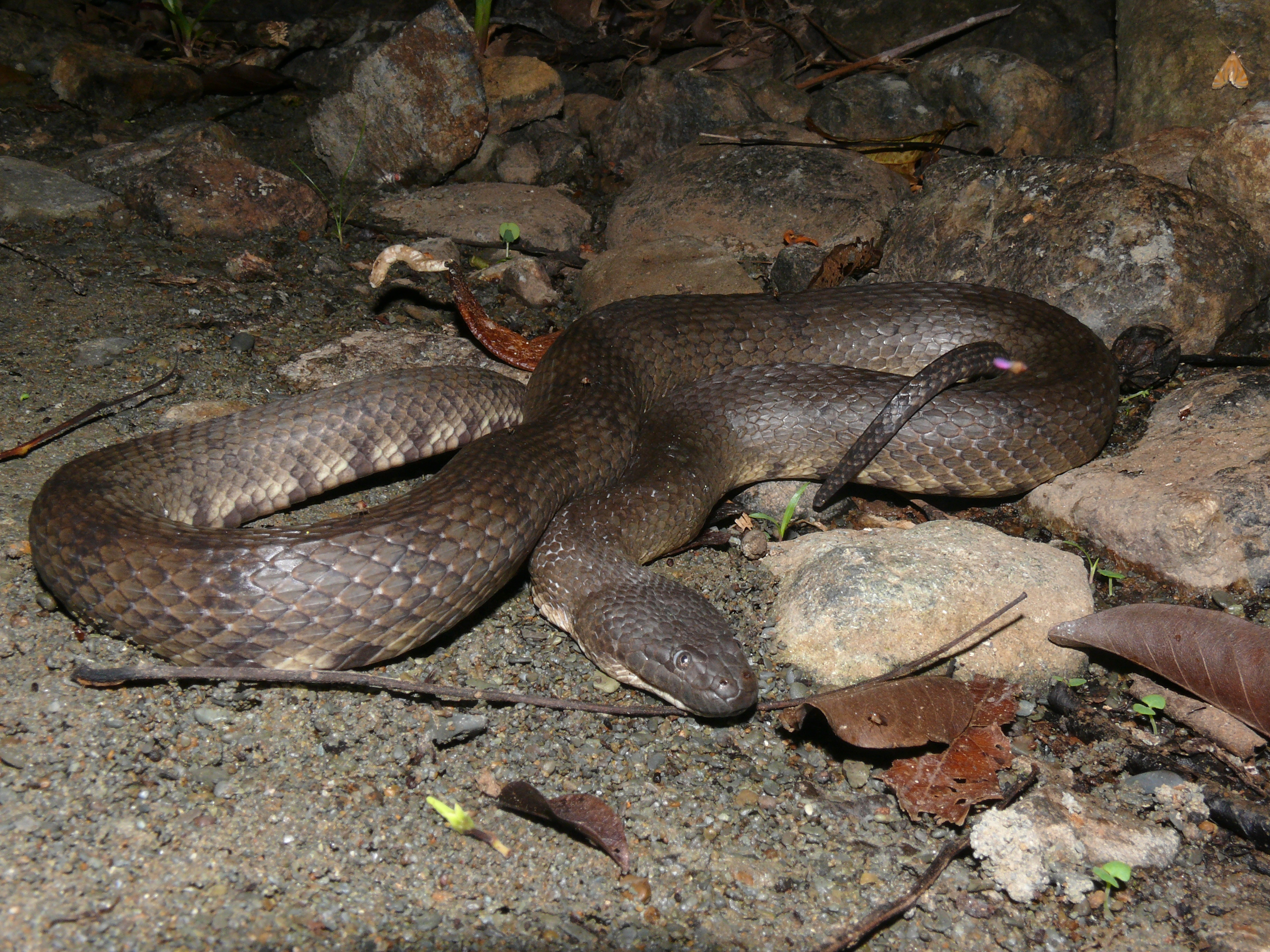
Lateral view

===== Genus: Dieurostus =====
====== Dieurostus dussumierii (Dussumier's water snake / ചെളിക്കൂട) ======
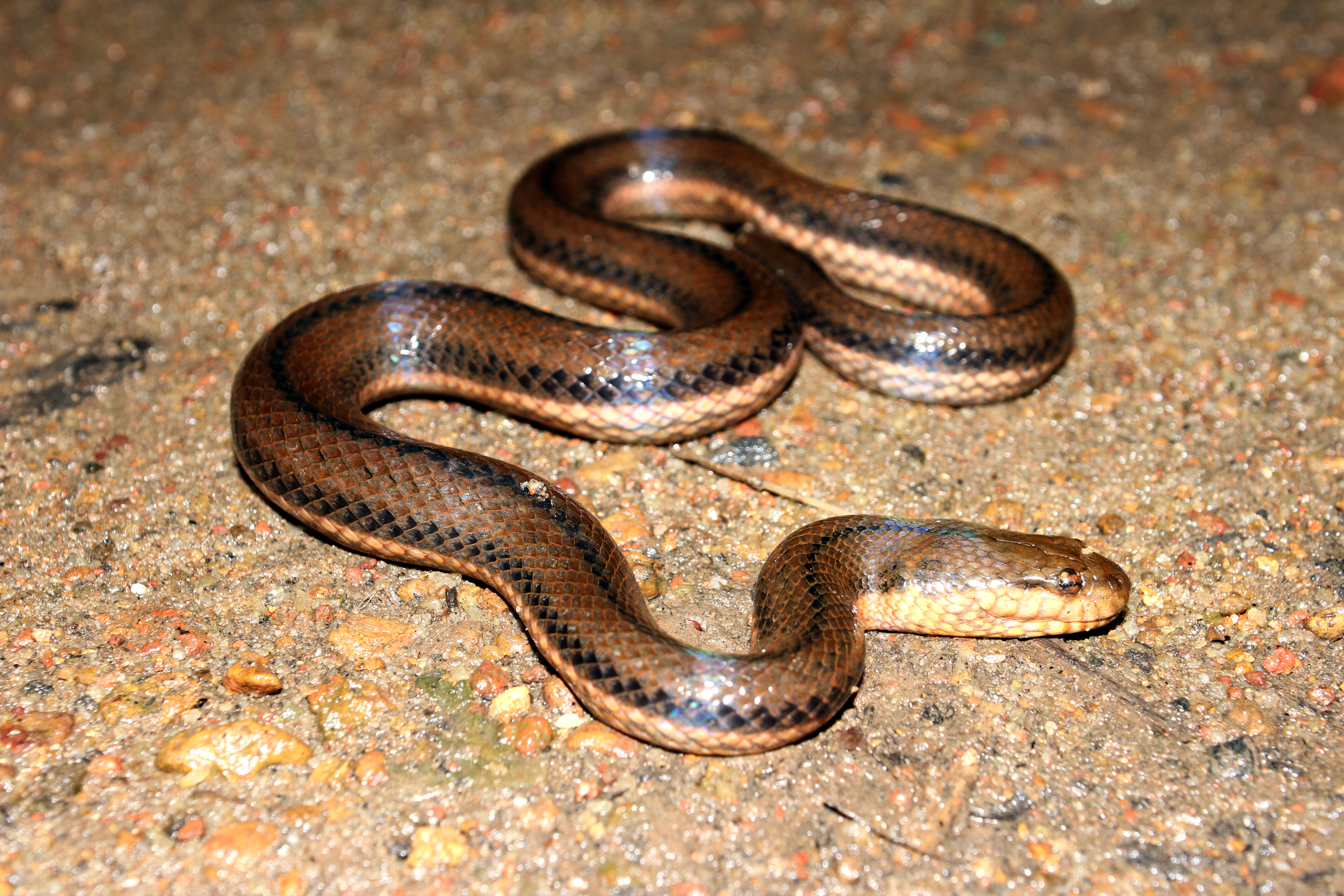
Lateral view

==== Family: Natricidae/Natricinae (Keelbacks) ====
===== Genus: Atretium =====
====== Atretium schistosum (split keelback / പച്ചനീർമണ്ഡലി) ======
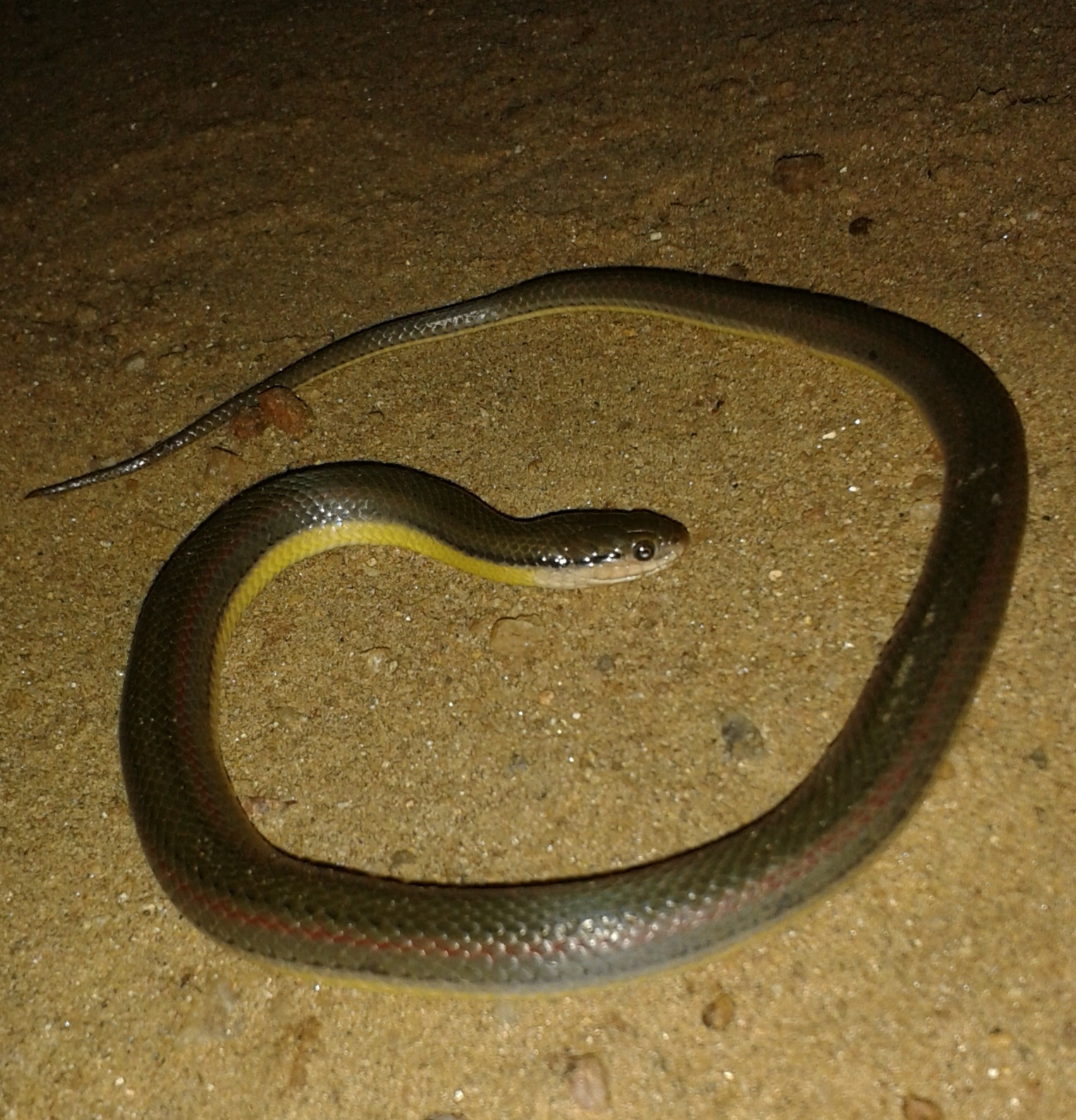
Dorsal view

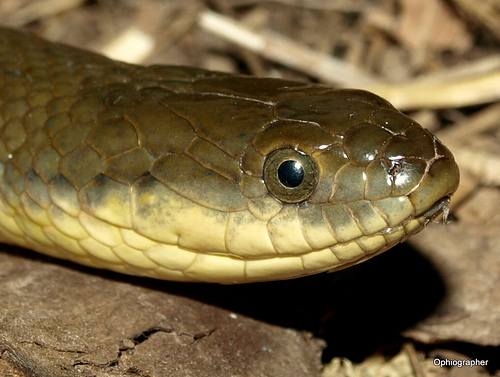
Head

===== Genus: Amphiesma =====
====== Amphiesma stolatum (buff striped keelback / തെയ്യാൻ പാമ്പ്) ======
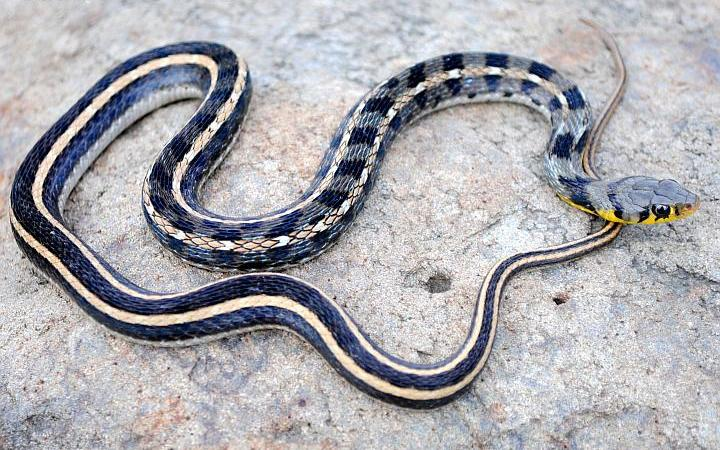
Dorsal view

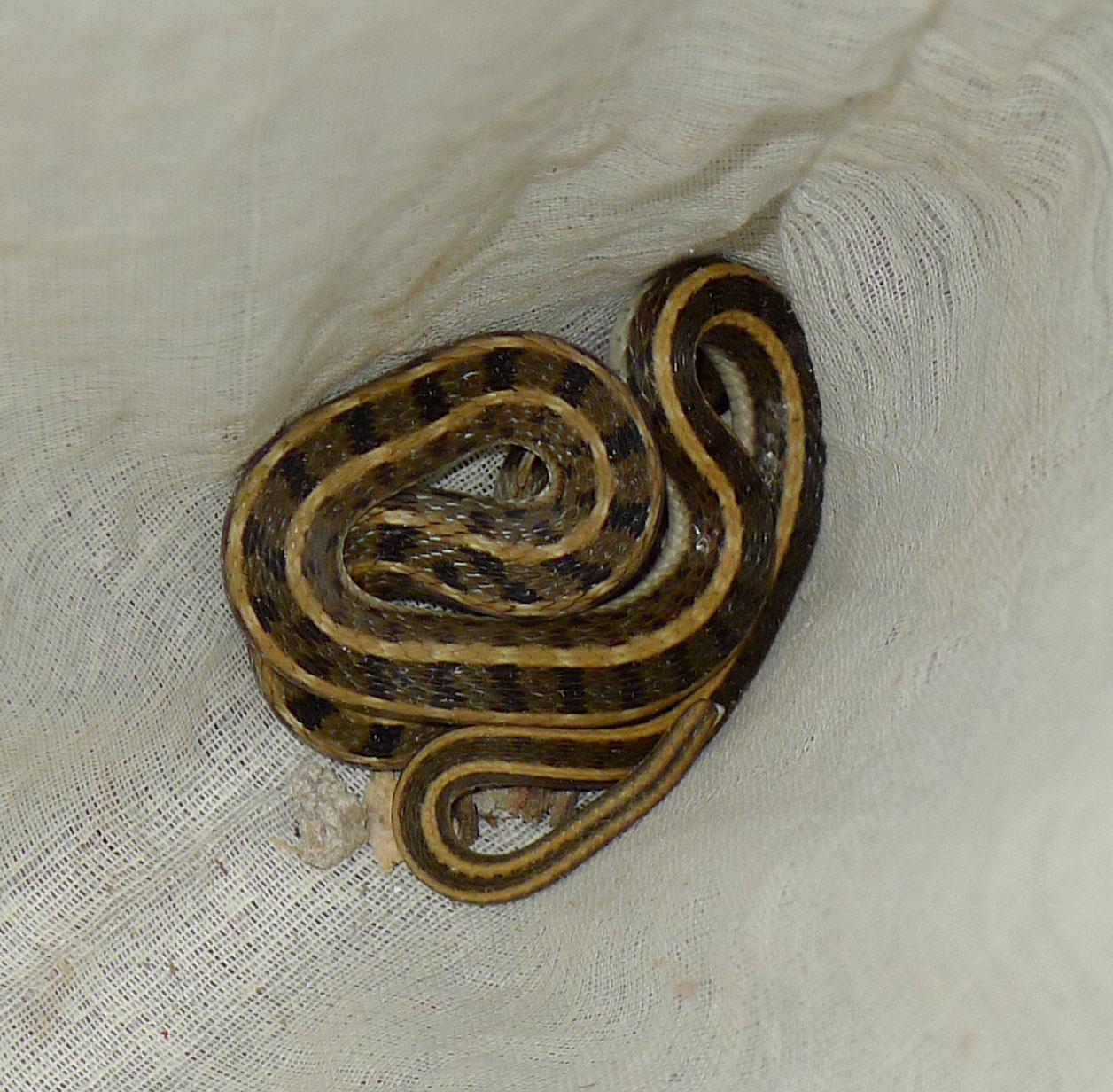
Dorsal view

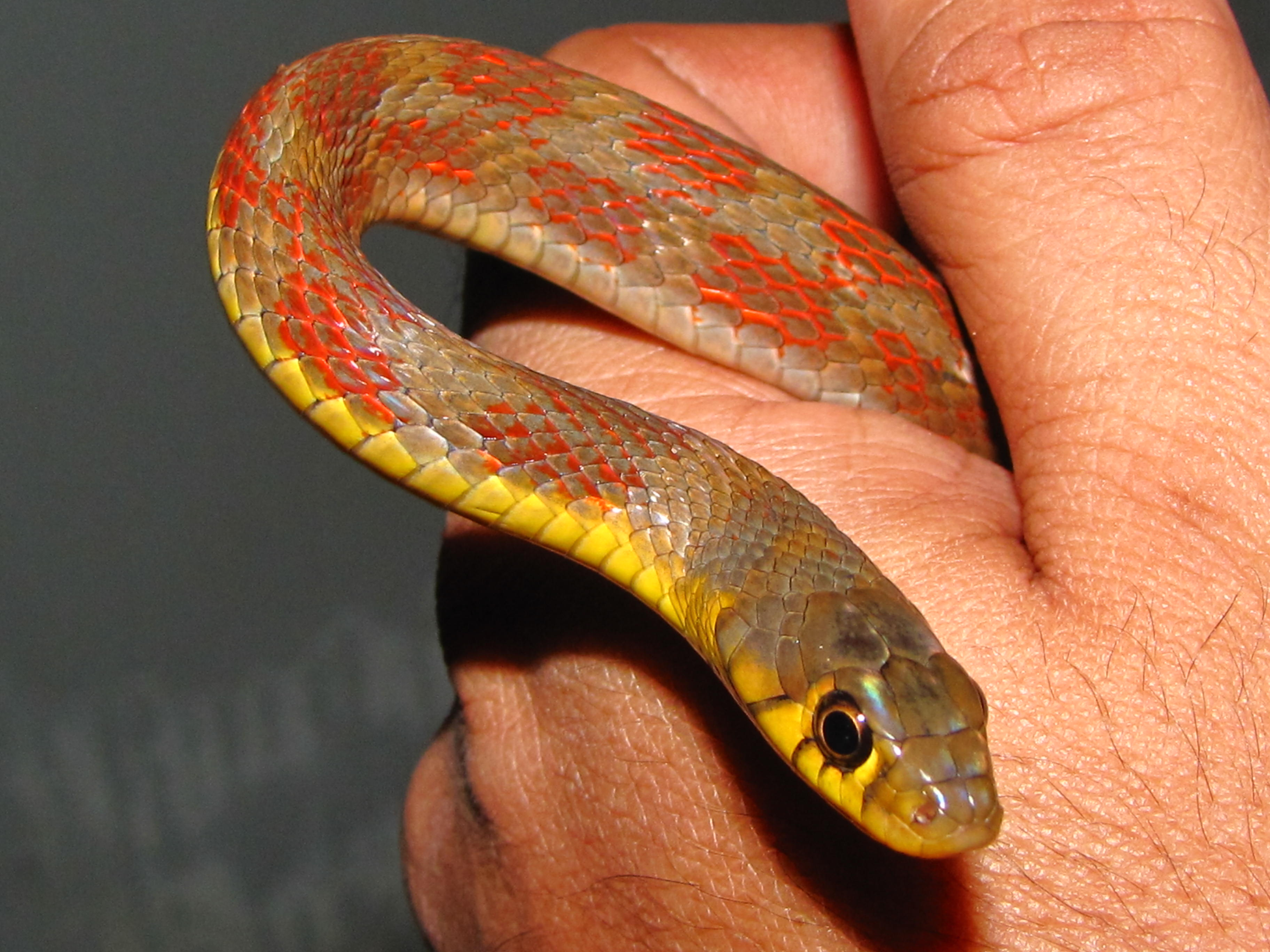
Head

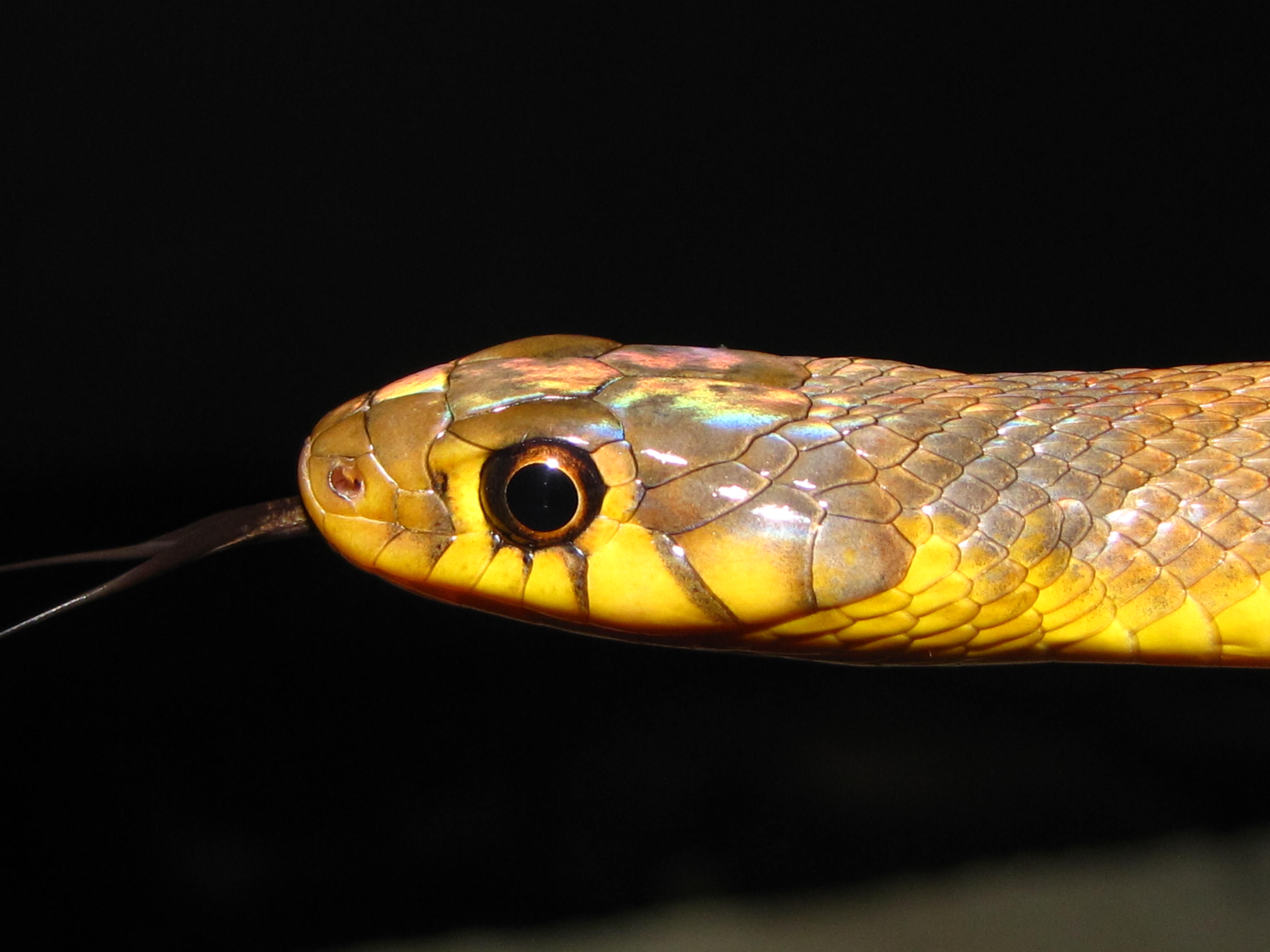
Head

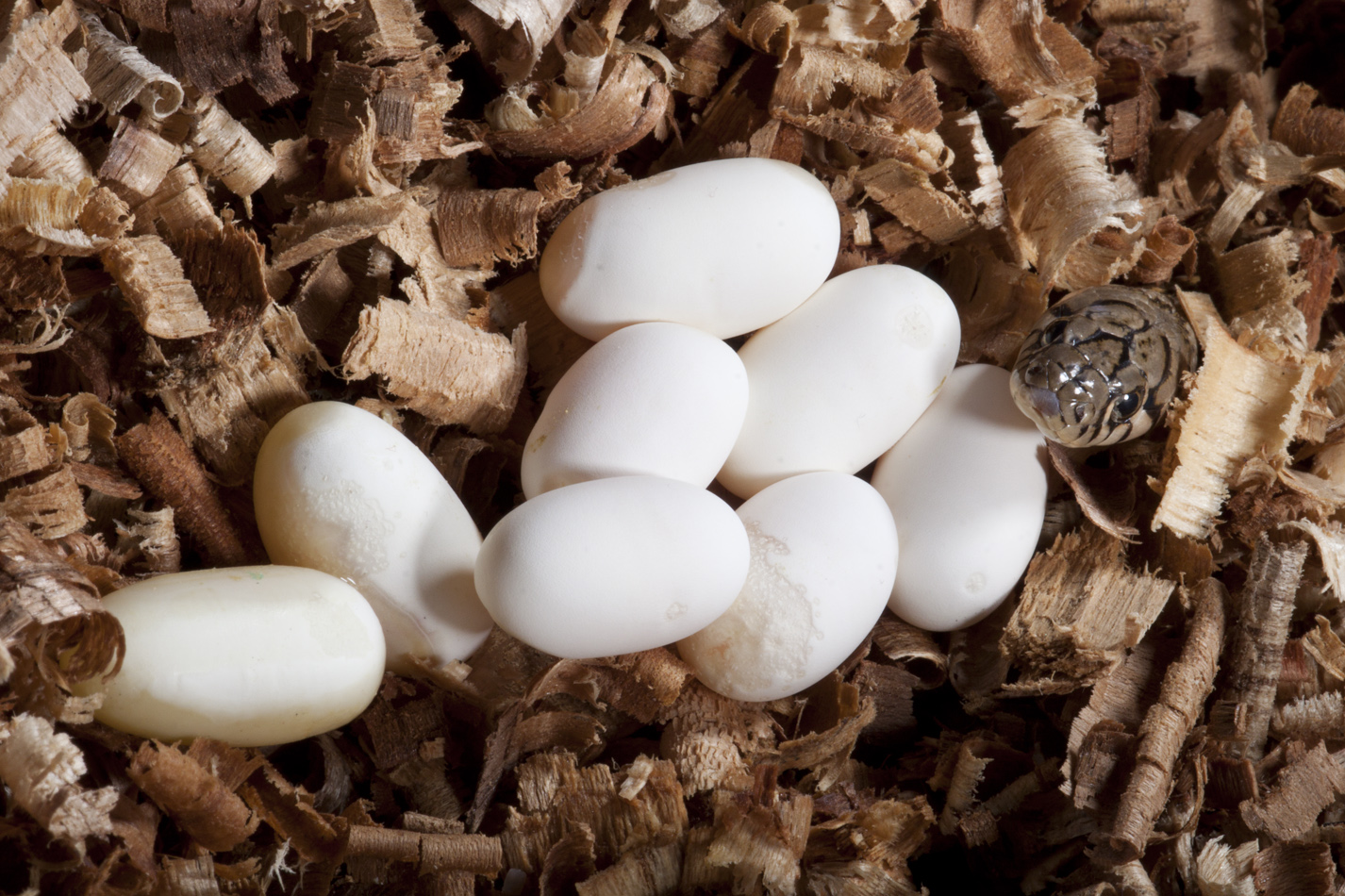
Eggs

===== Genus: Hebius =====
====== Hebius beddomei (Nilgiri keelback / മലനീർക്കോലി) ======
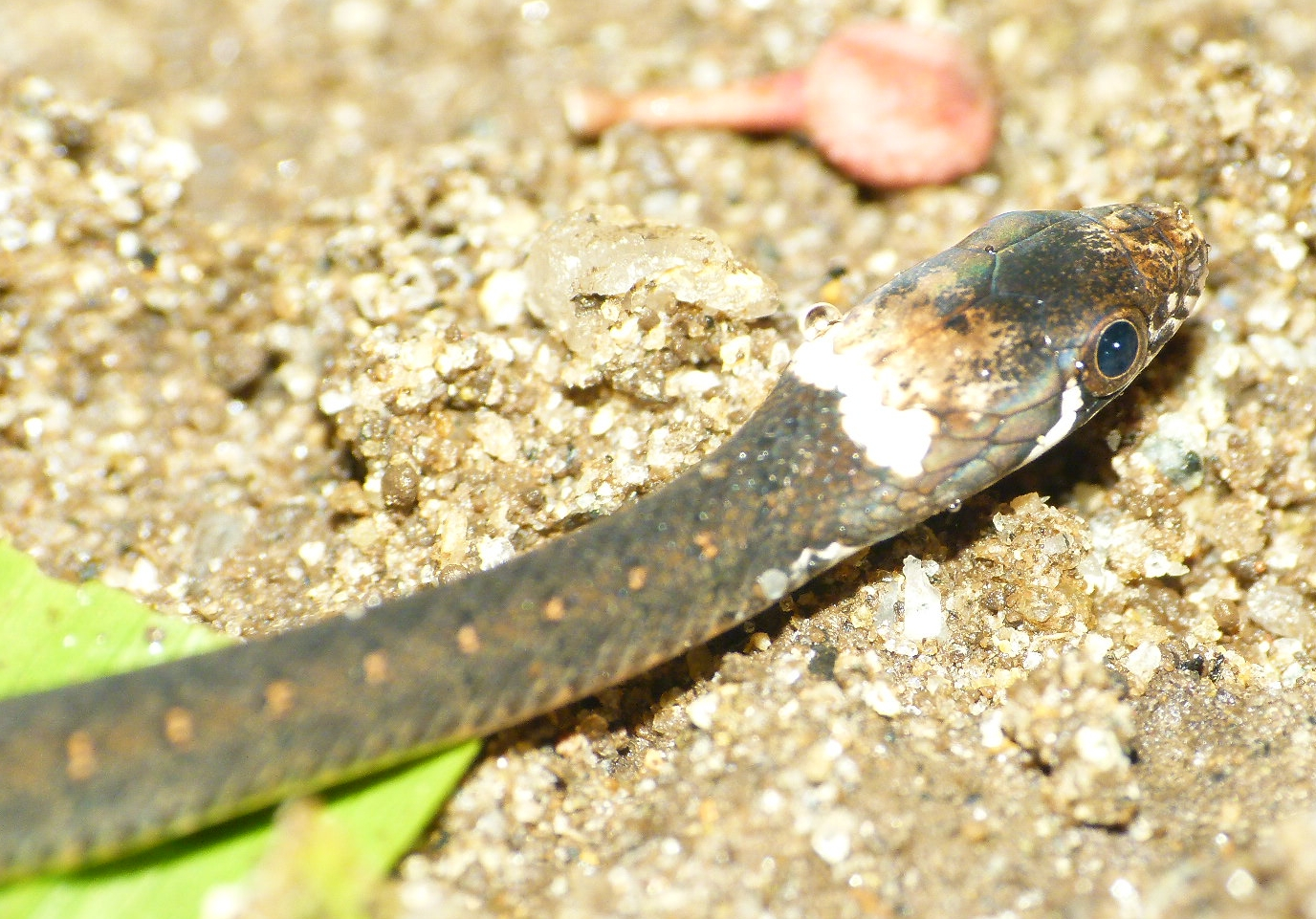
Head

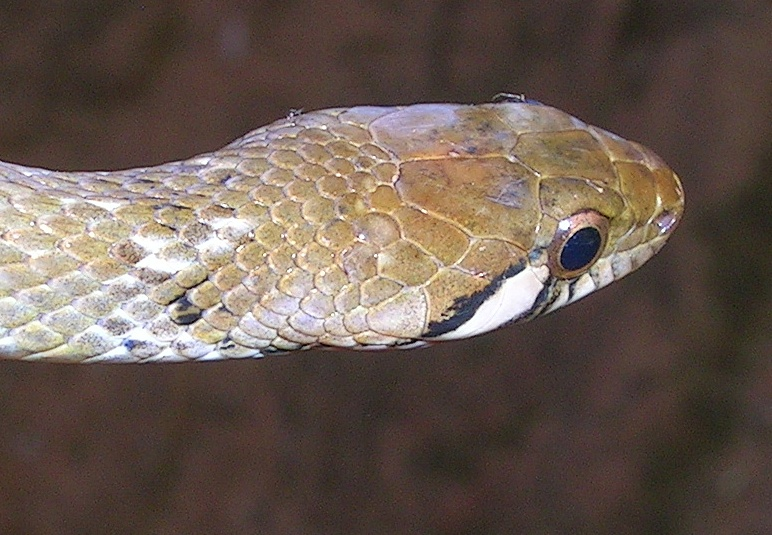
Head

====== Amphiesma monticola (hill keelback / കാട്ടുനീർക്കോലി) ======
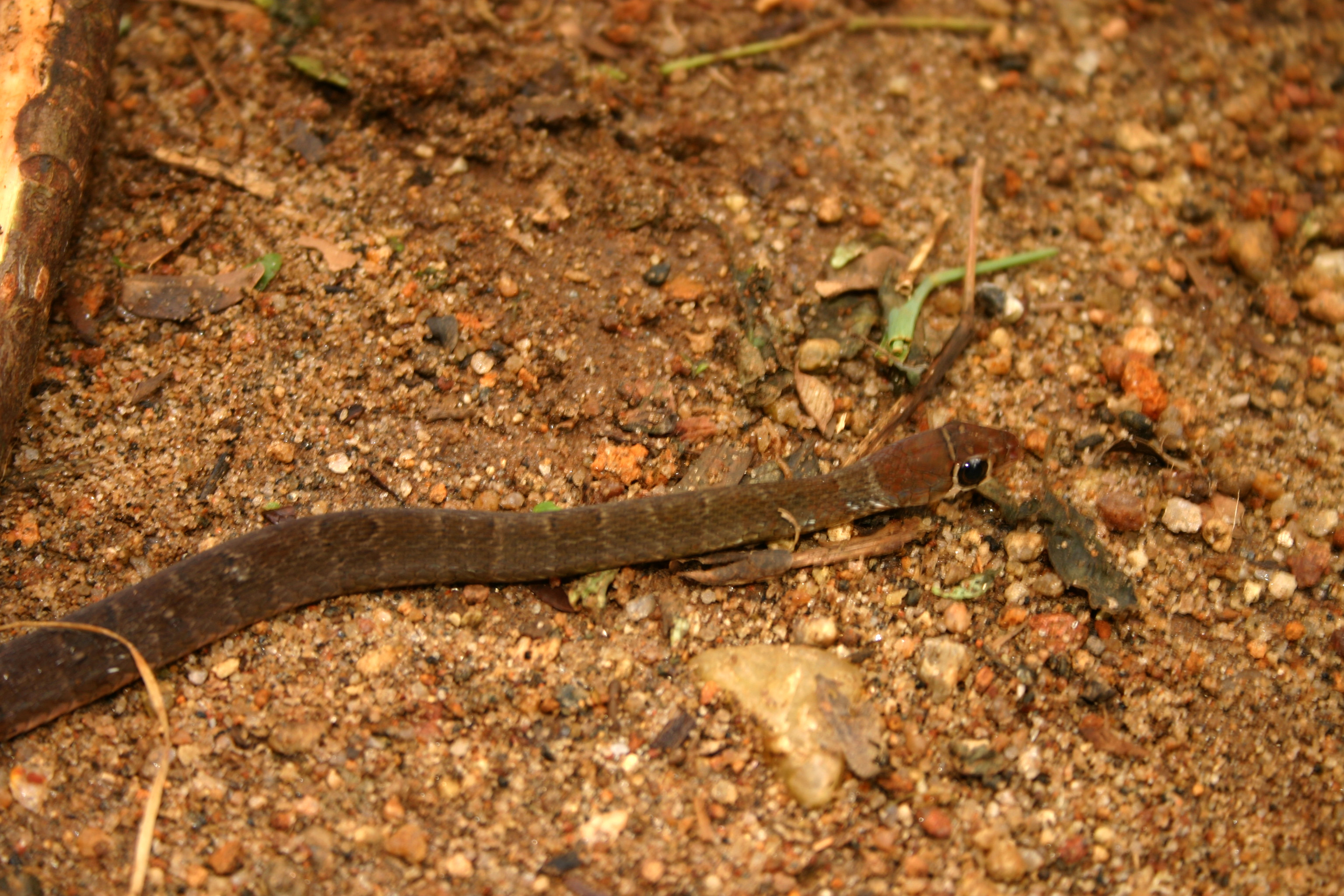
Dorsal view

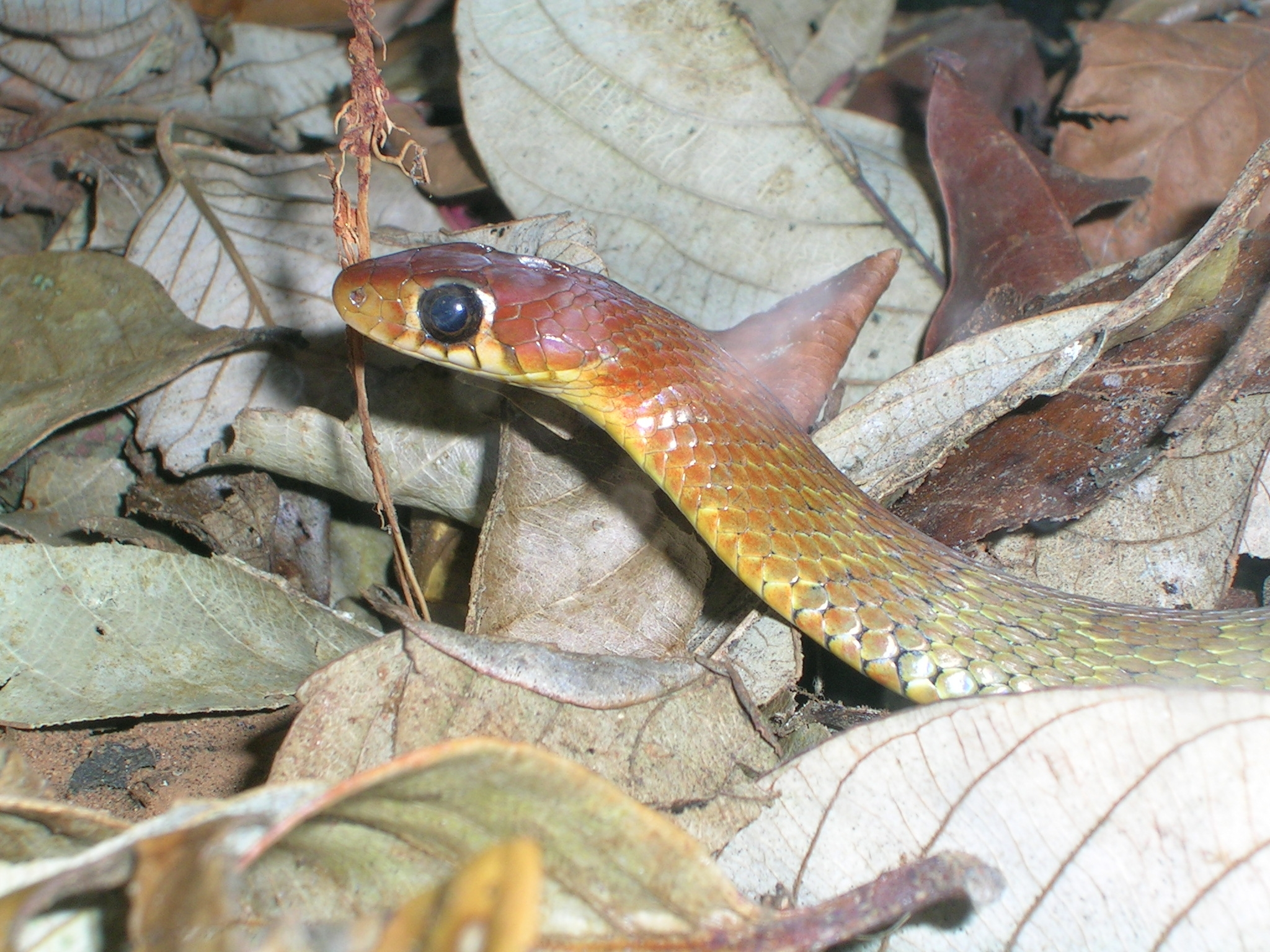
Head

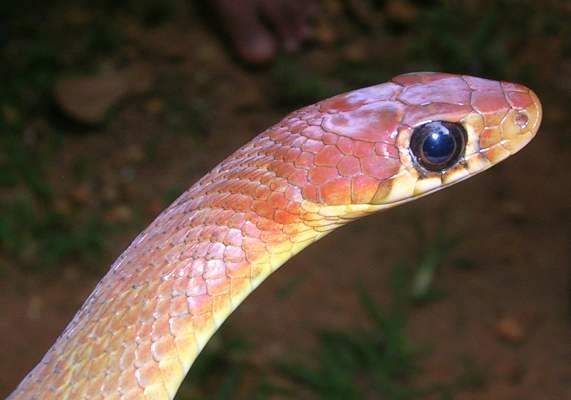
Head

===== Genus: Rhabdophis =====
====== Rhabdophis plumbicolor (green keelback / പച്ചനാഗം) ======
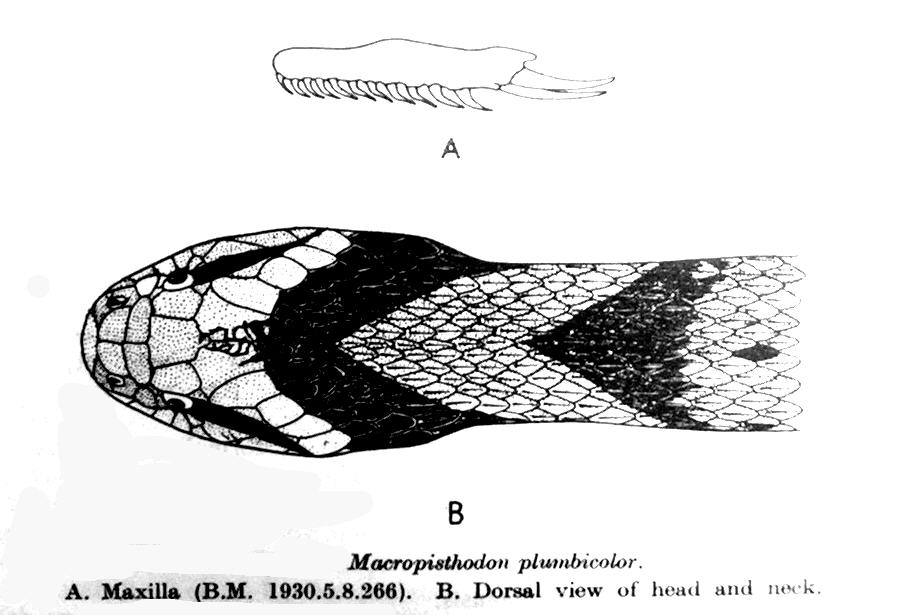
Illustration

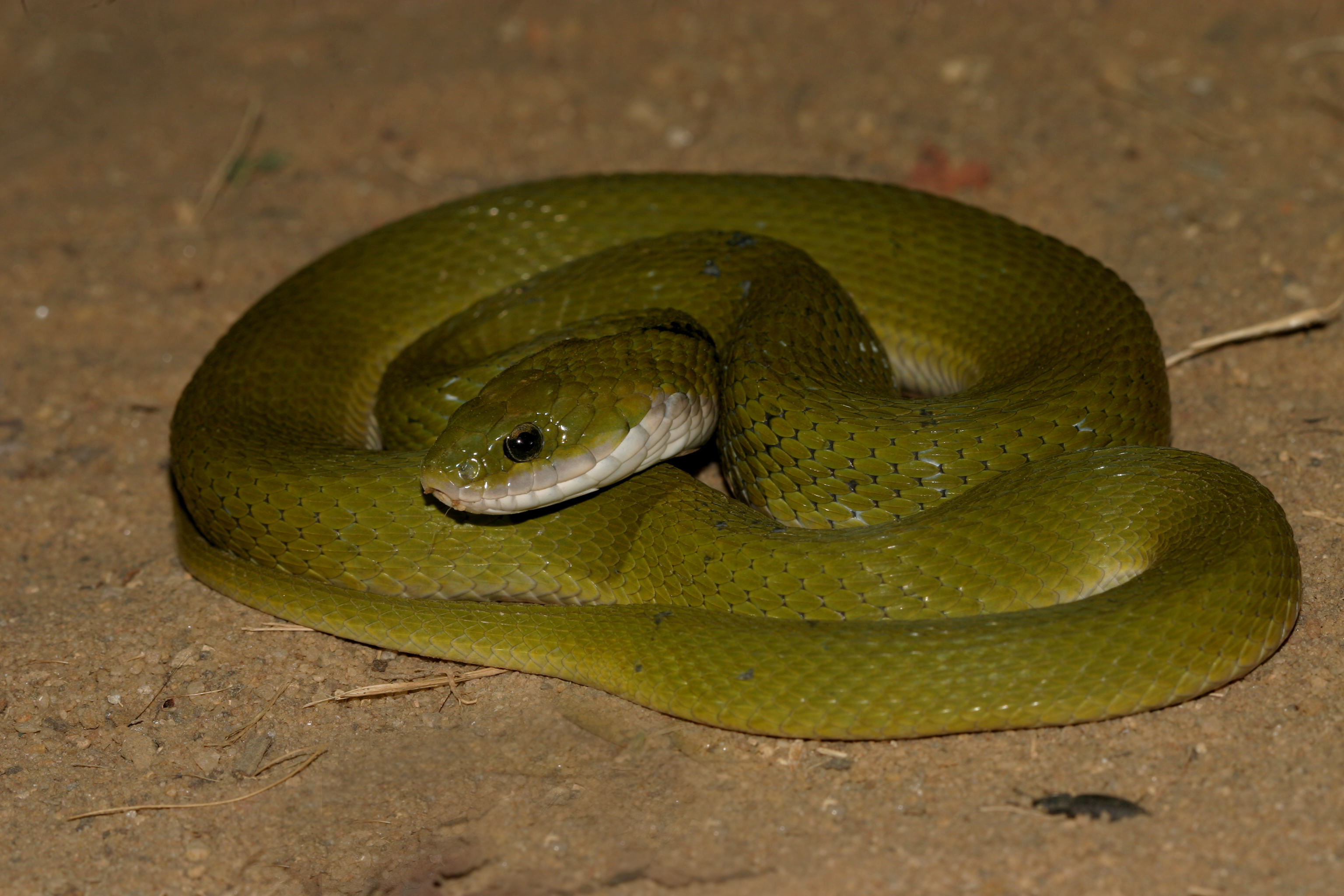
Lateral view (adult)

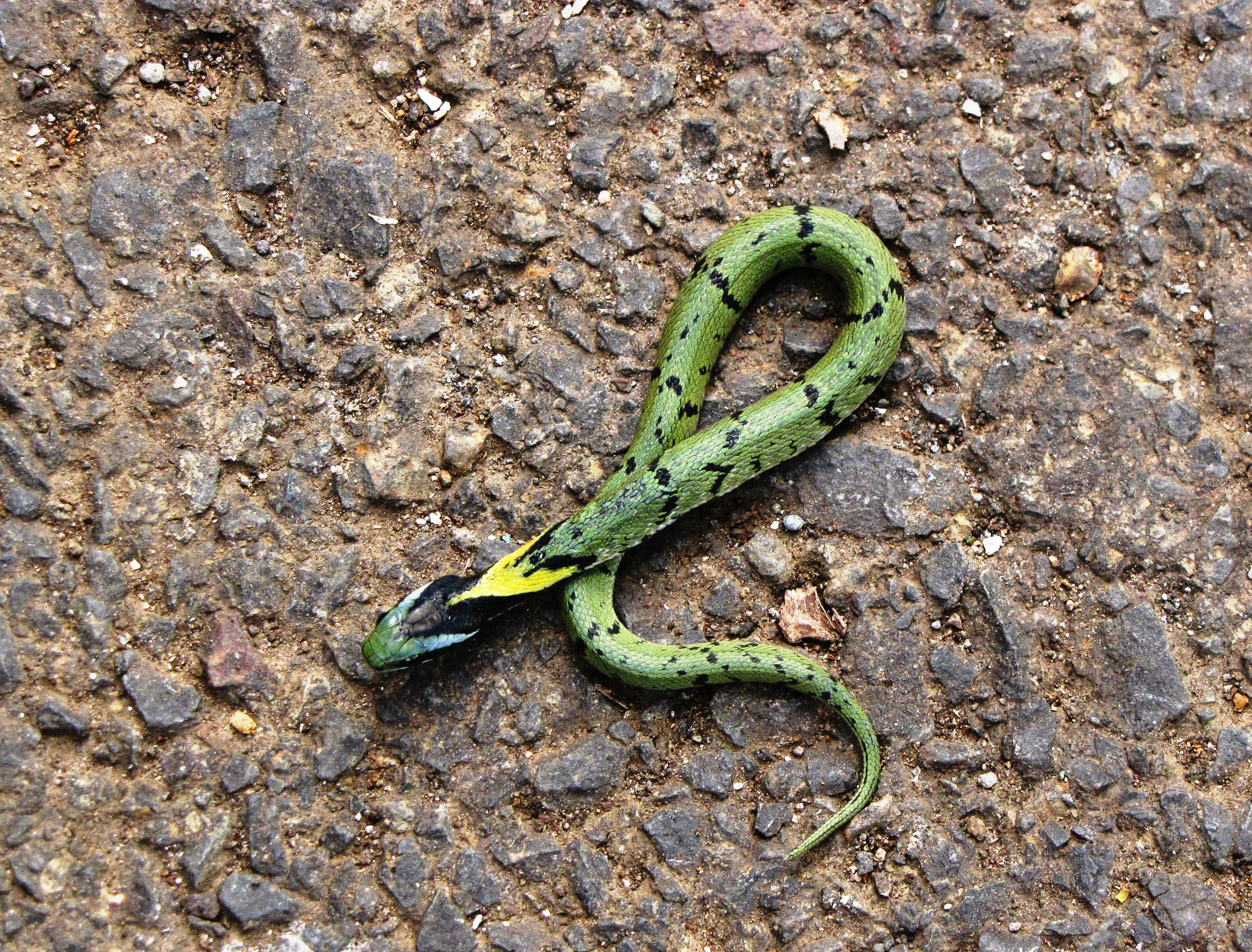
Dorsal view (juvenile)

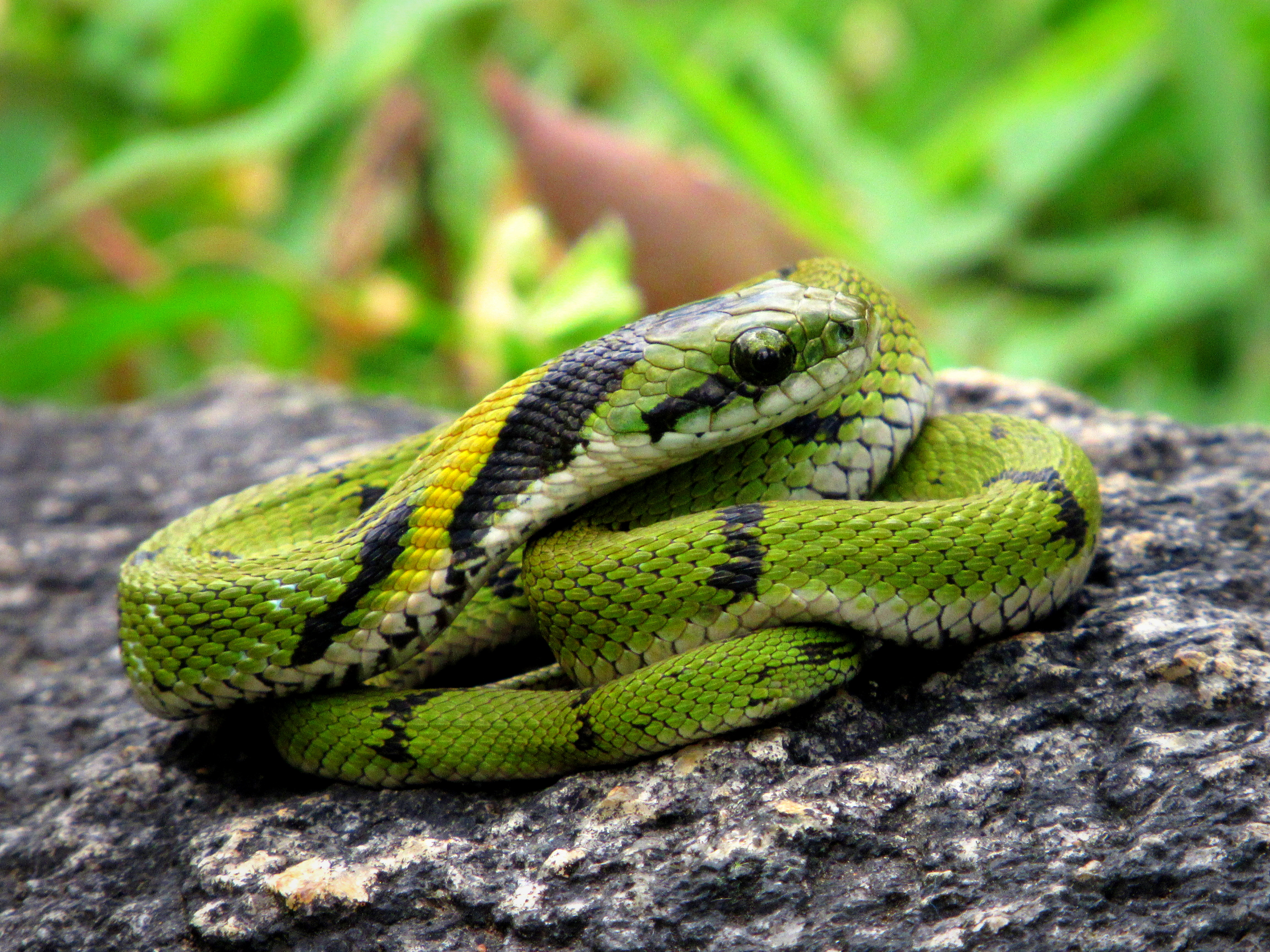
Lateral view (juvenile)

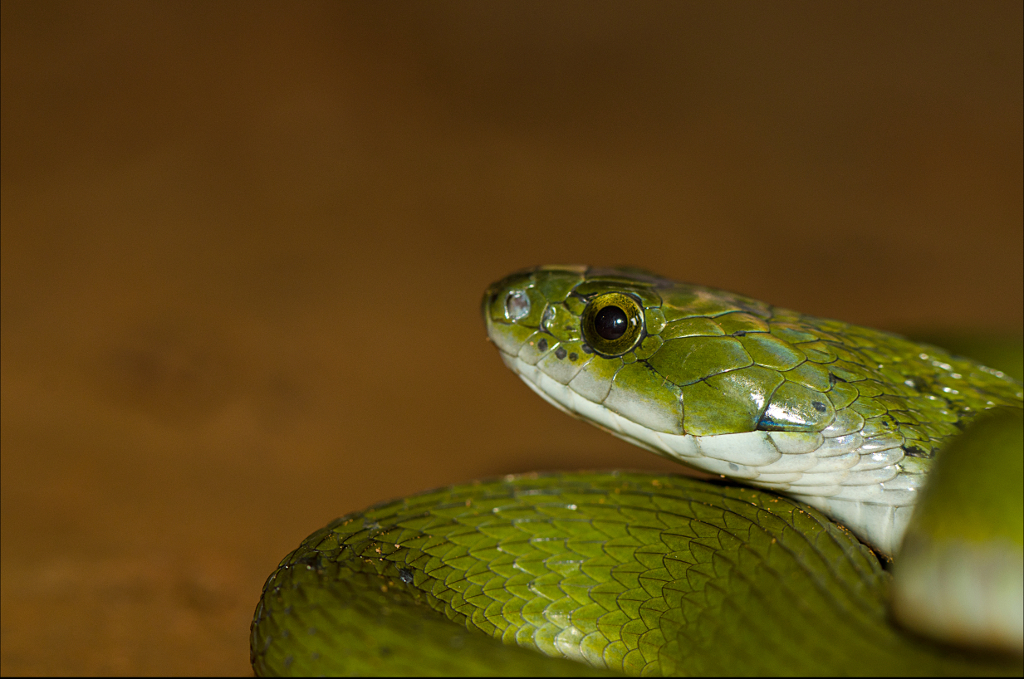
Head

===== Genus: Fowlea =====
====== Fowlea piscator (checkered keelback / നീർക്കോലി) ======
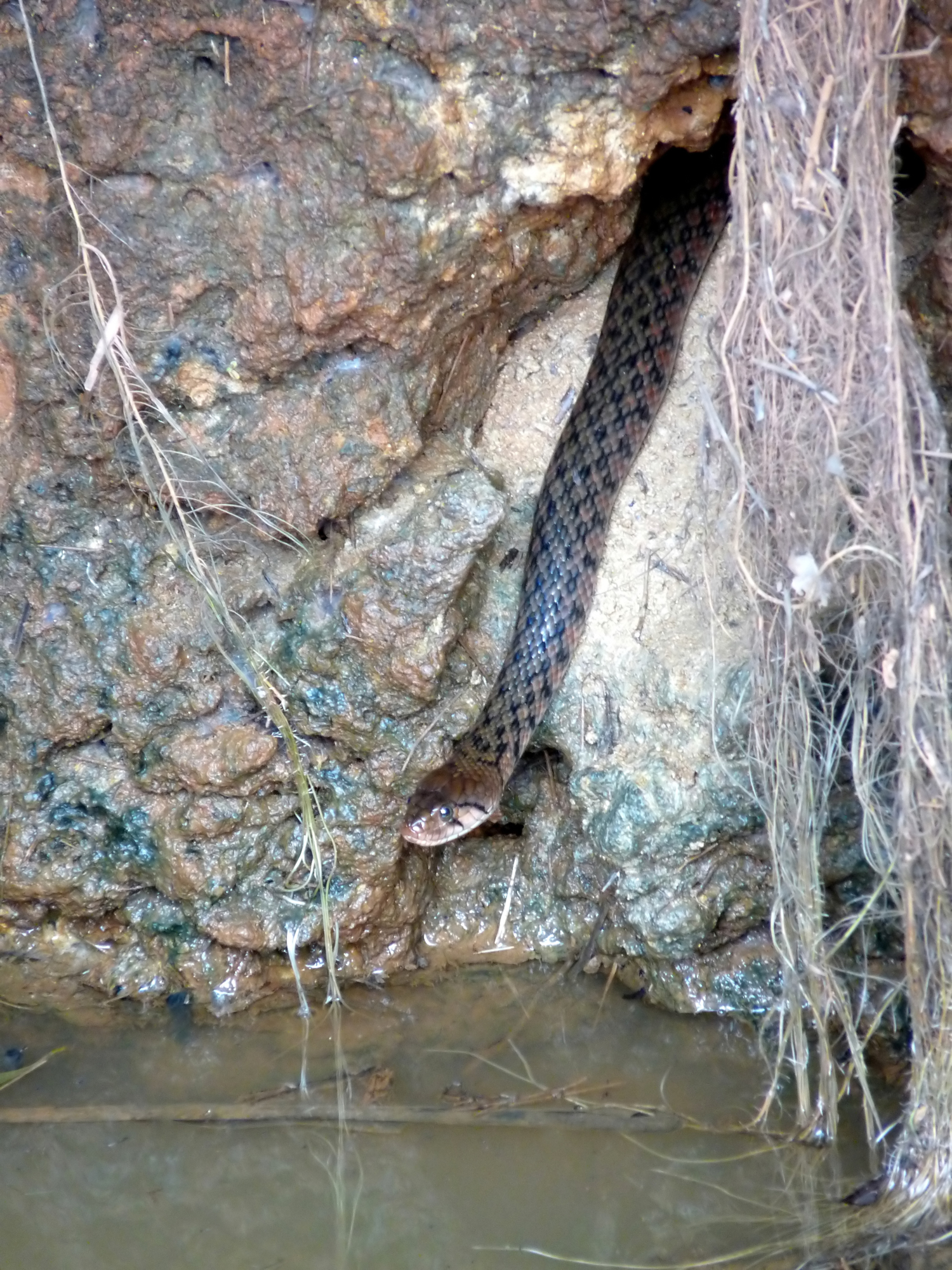
Dorsal view

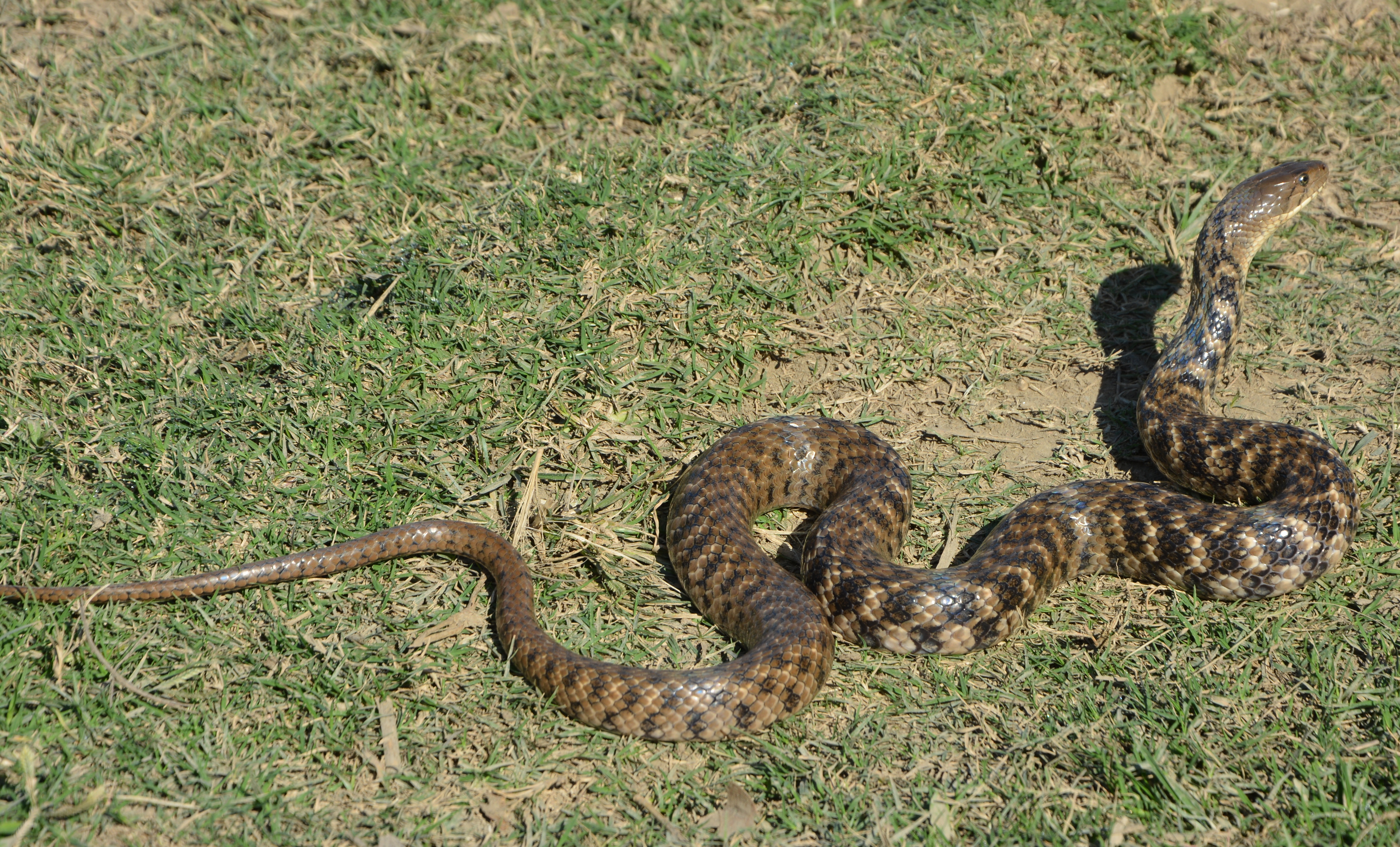
Lateral view

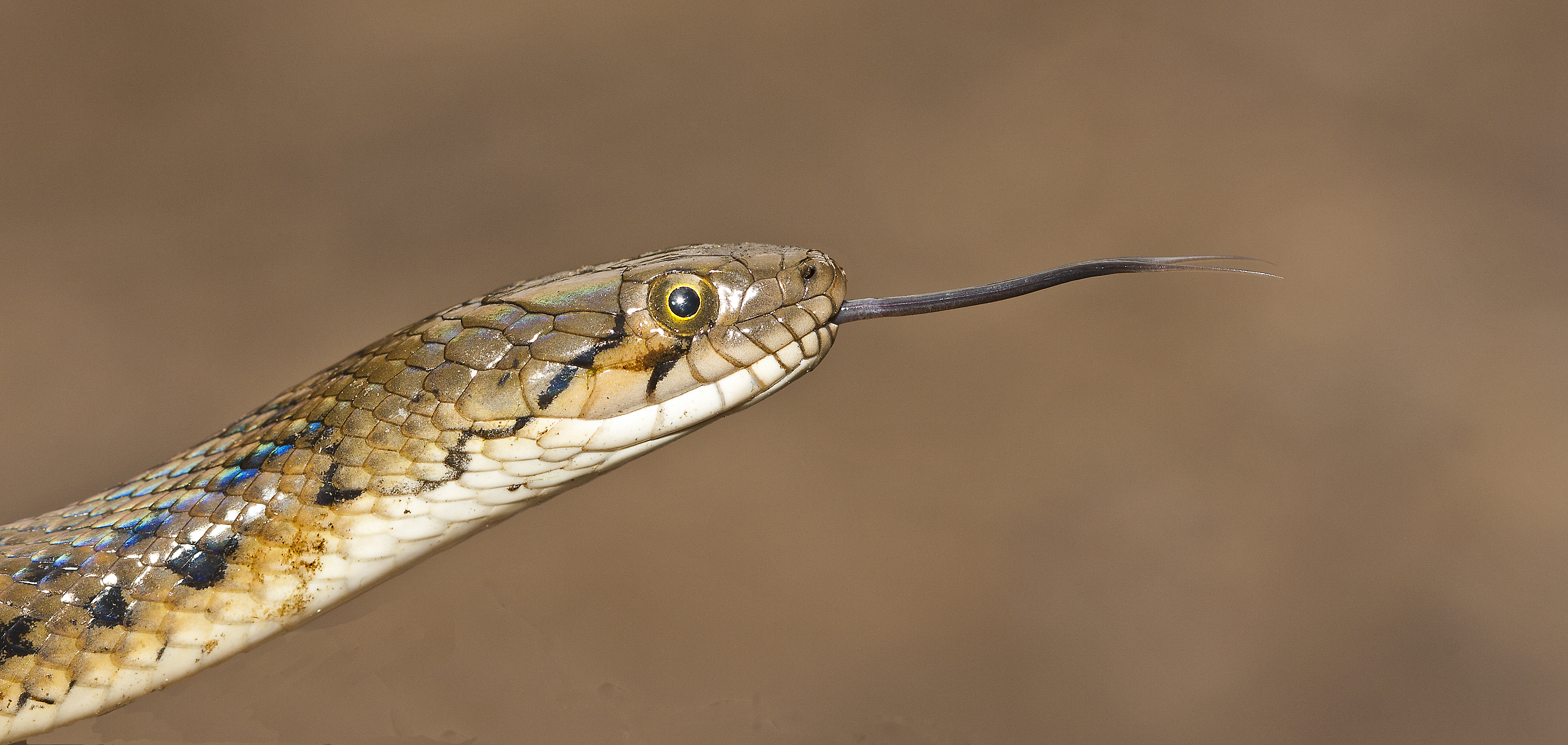
Head

==== Family: Pythonidae (pythons) ====
===== Genus: Python =====
====== Python molurus (Indian python / മലമ്പാമ്പ്) ======
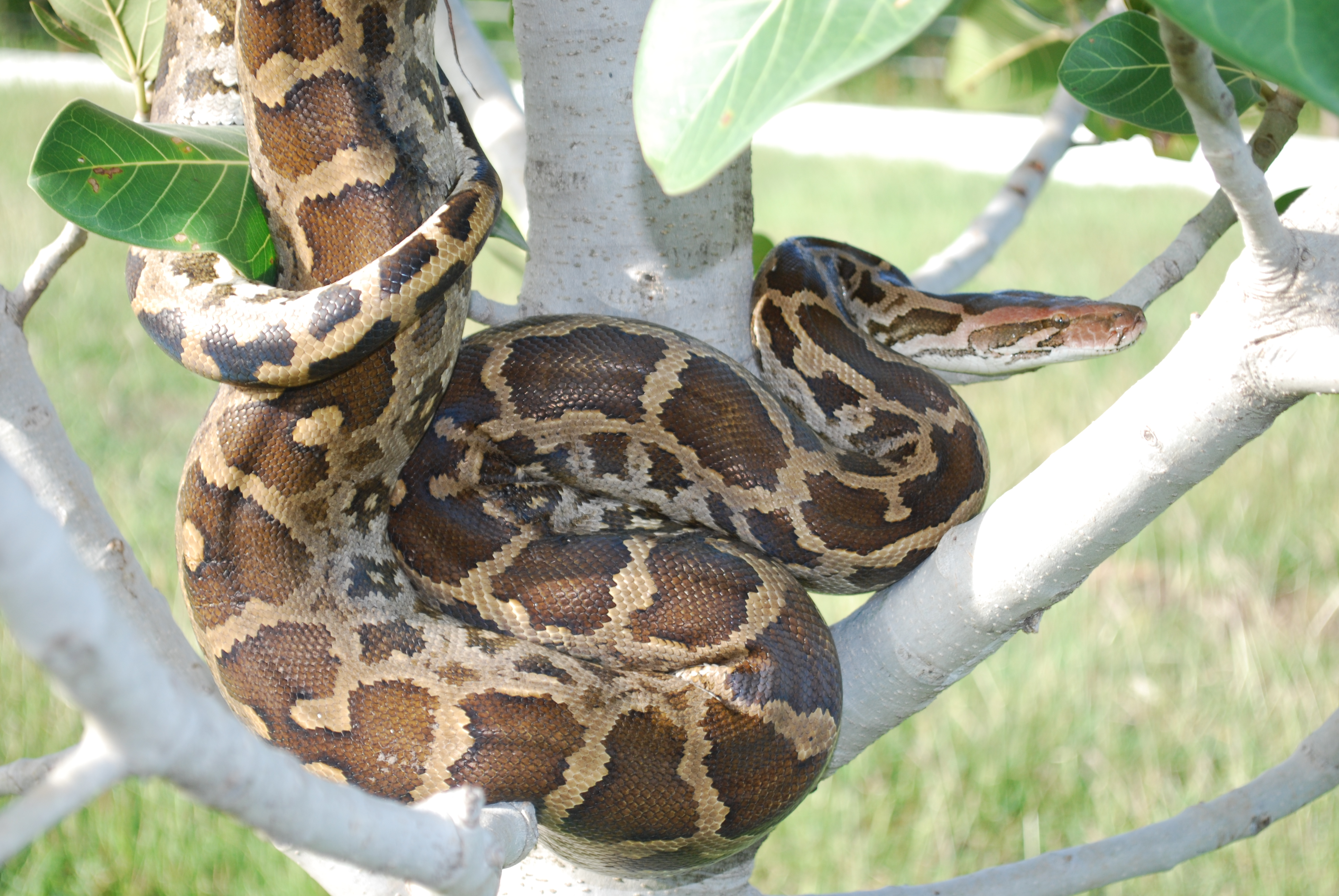
Dorsal view

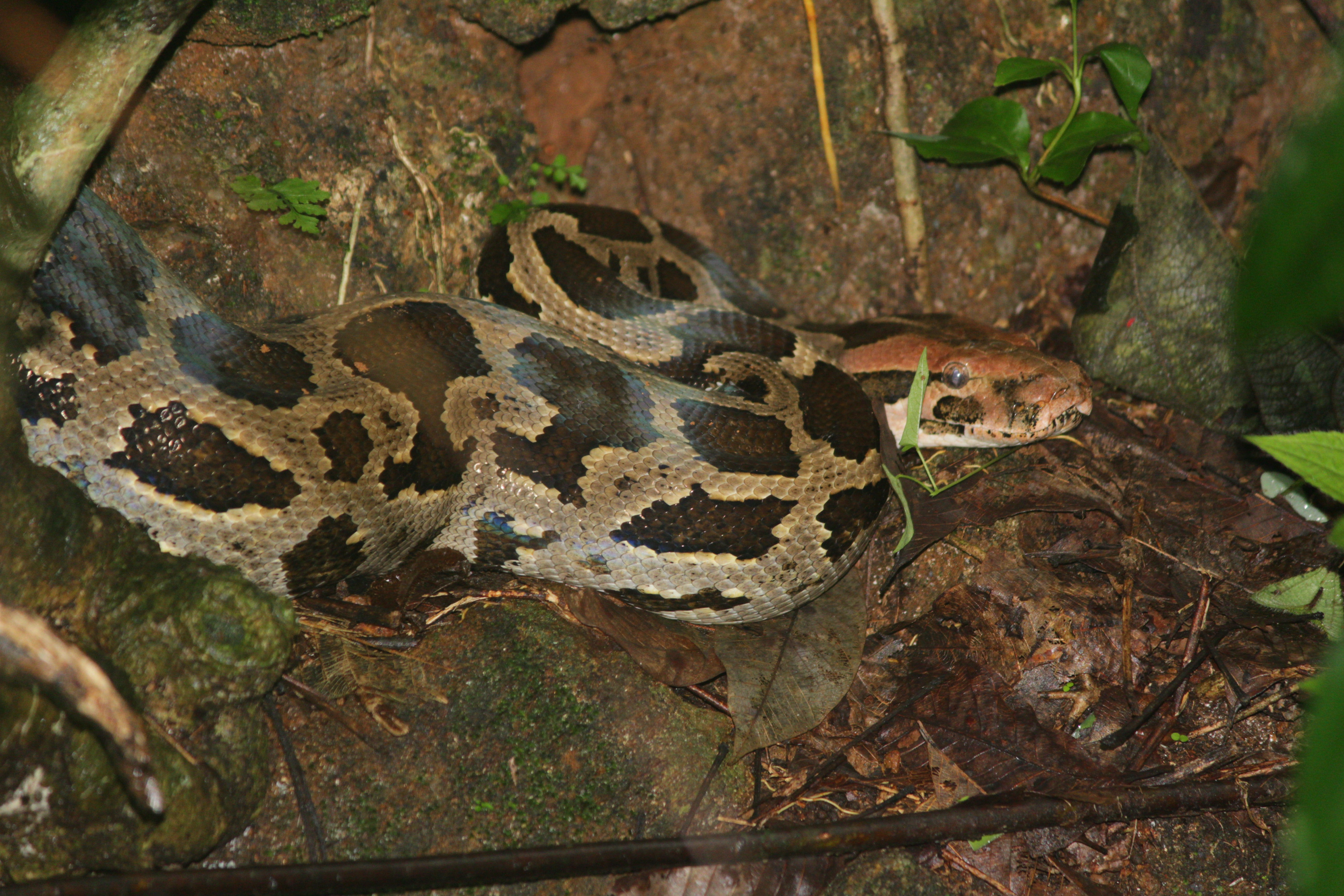
Lateral view

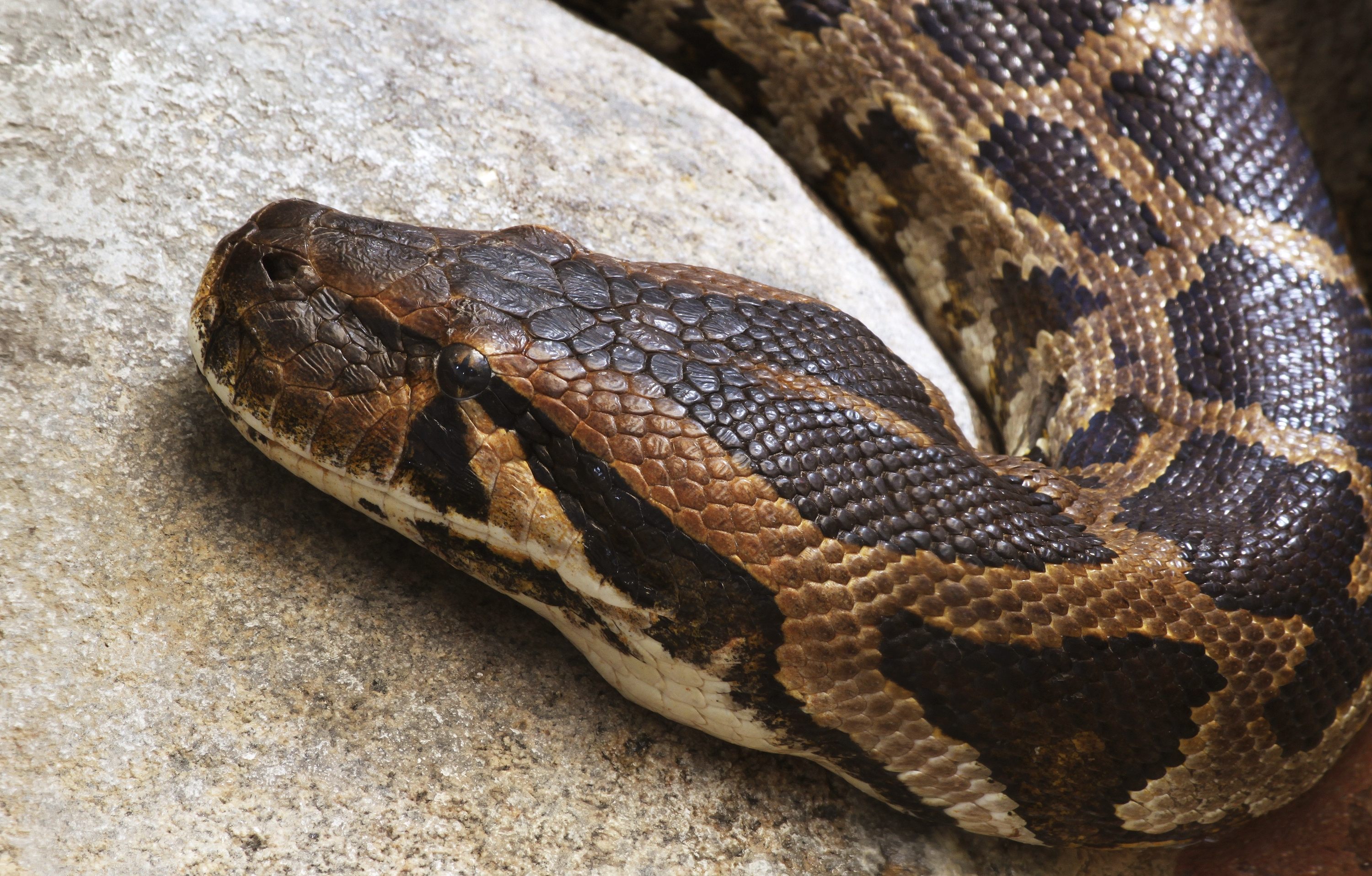
Head

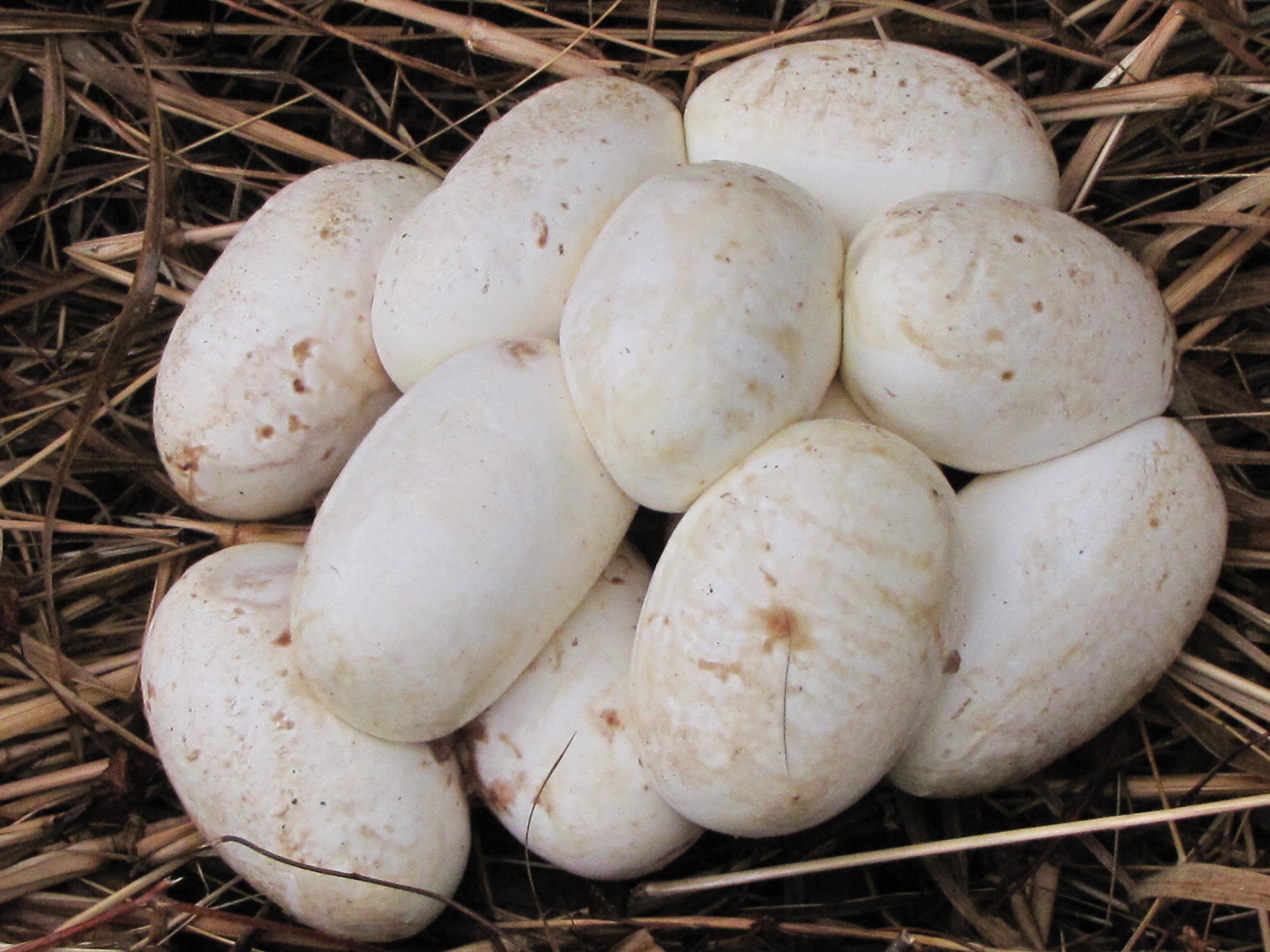
Eggs

==== Family: Typhlopidae (blind snakes) ====
===== Genus: Indotyphlops =====
====== Indotyphlops braminus (brahminy blind snake) ======
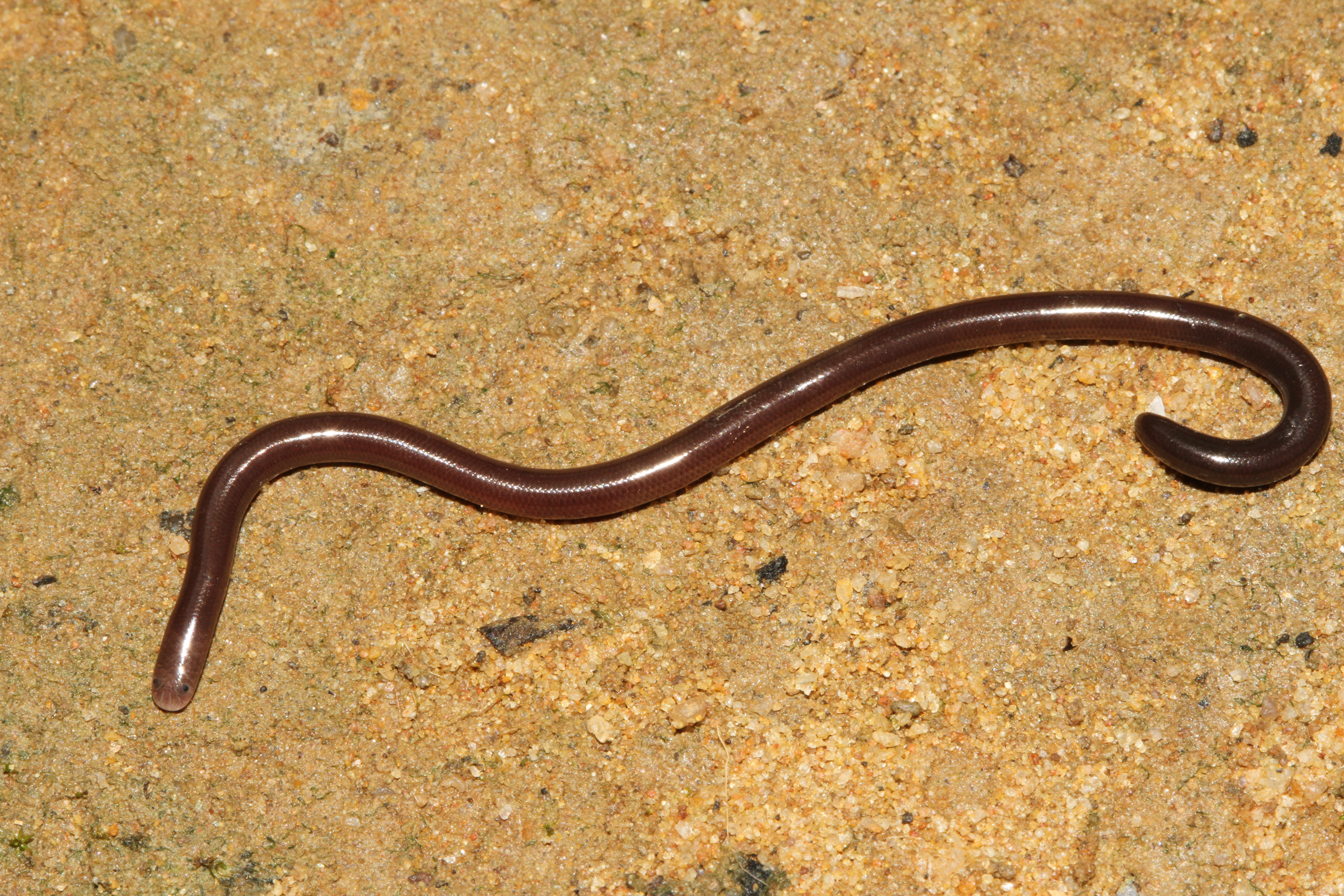

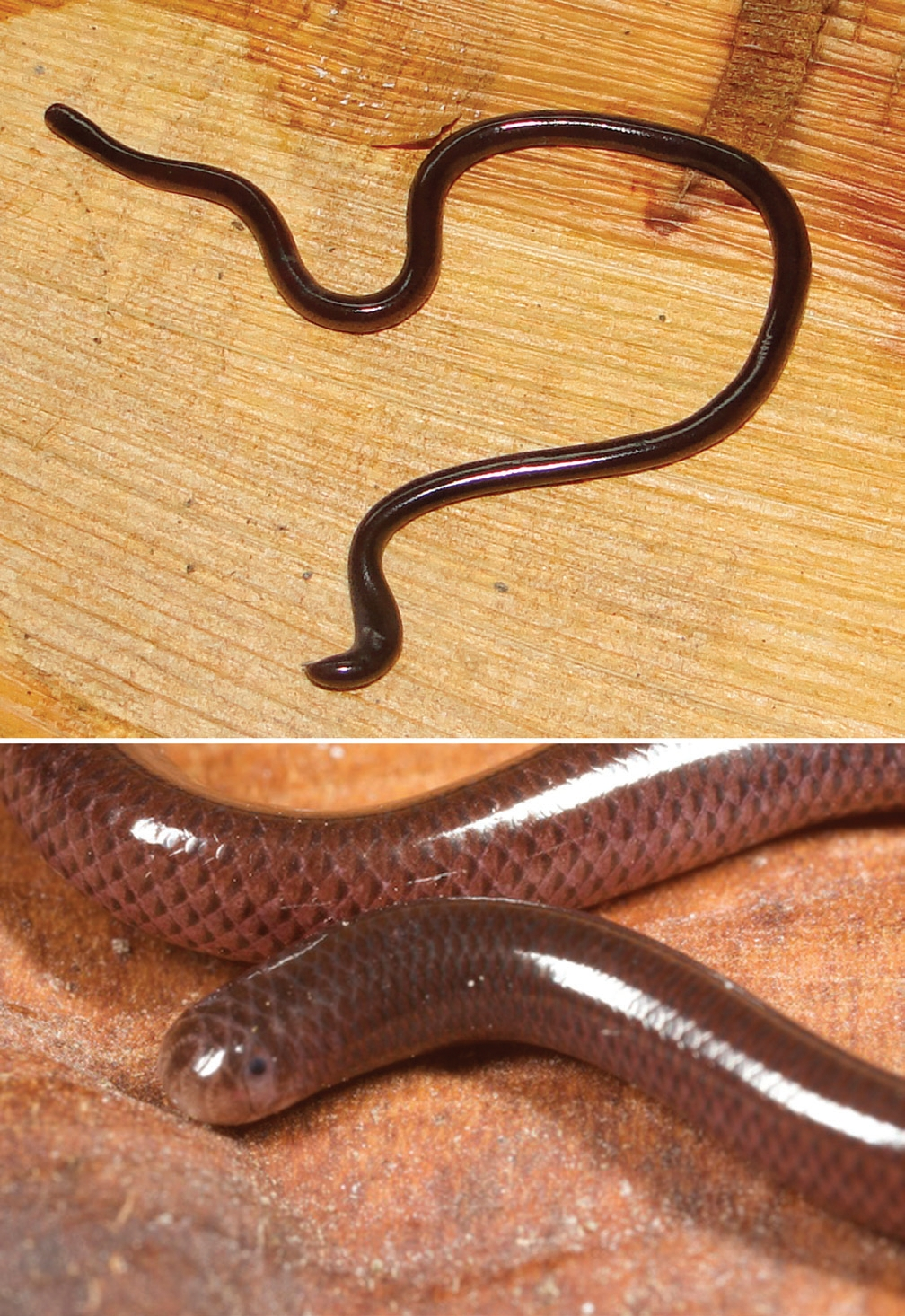

==== Family: Uropeltidae (shieldtails) ====
===== Genus: Melanophidium =====
====== Melanophidium bilineatum (two-lined black shieldtail) ======
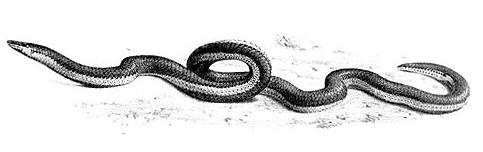
Illustration

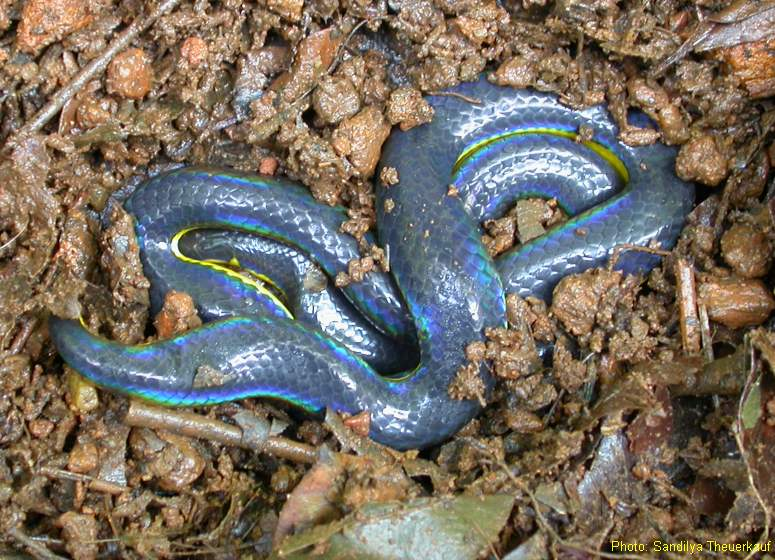
Dorsal view

====== Melanophidium punctatum (Beddome's black shieldtail) ======
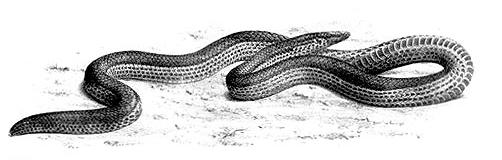
Illustration

===== Genus: Plectrurus =====
====== Plectrurus guentheri (Günther's burrowing snake) ======
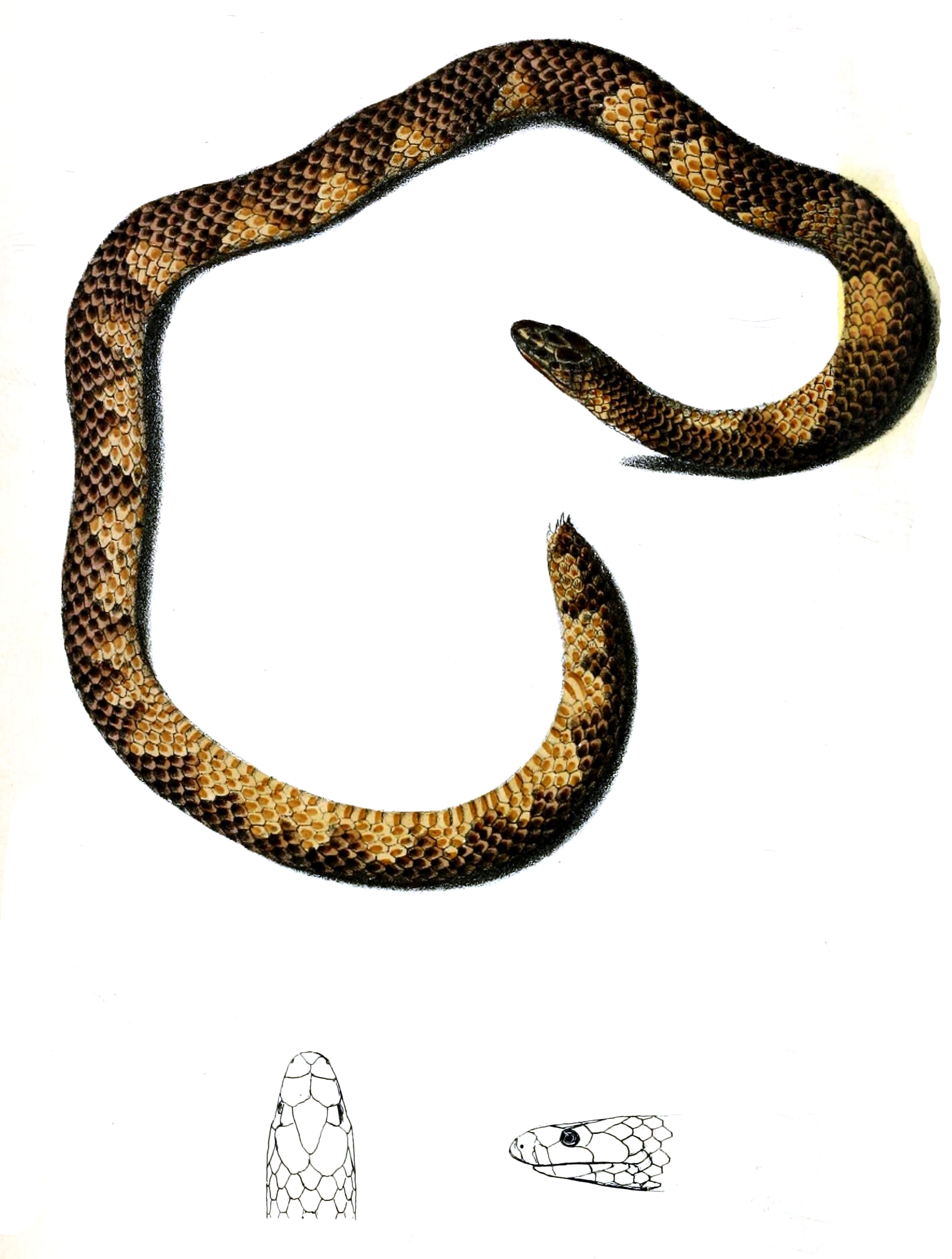
Illustration

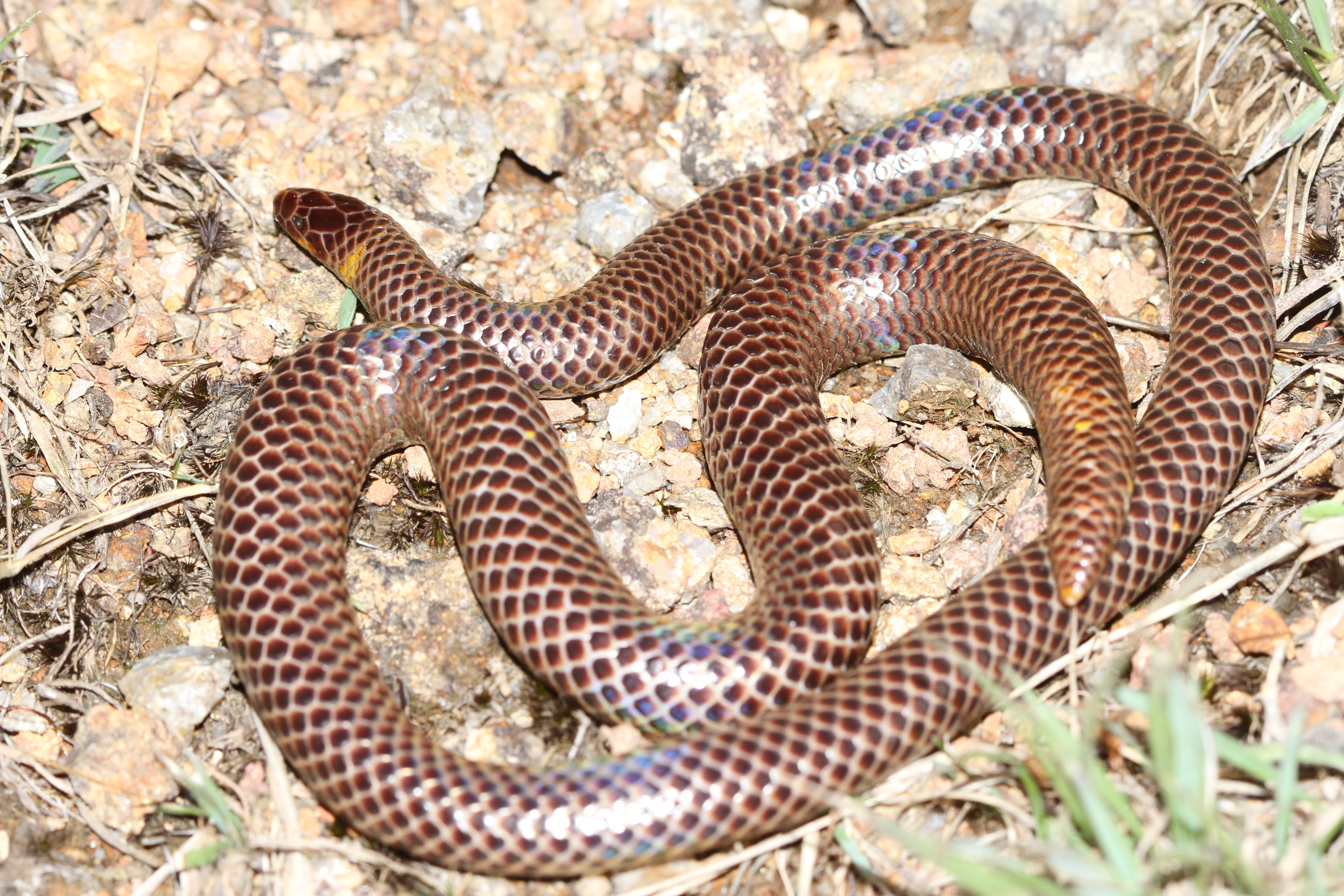
Dorsal view

====== Plectrurus perrotetii (Nilgiri burrowing snake) ======
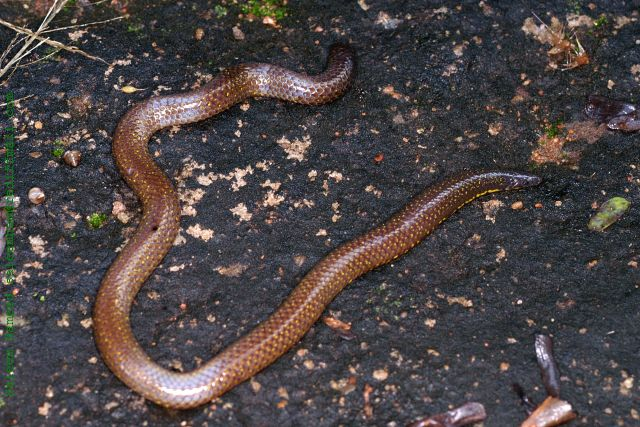
Dorsal view

===== Genus: Rhinophis =====
====== Rhinophis fergusonianus (Cardamom Hills earth snake) ======
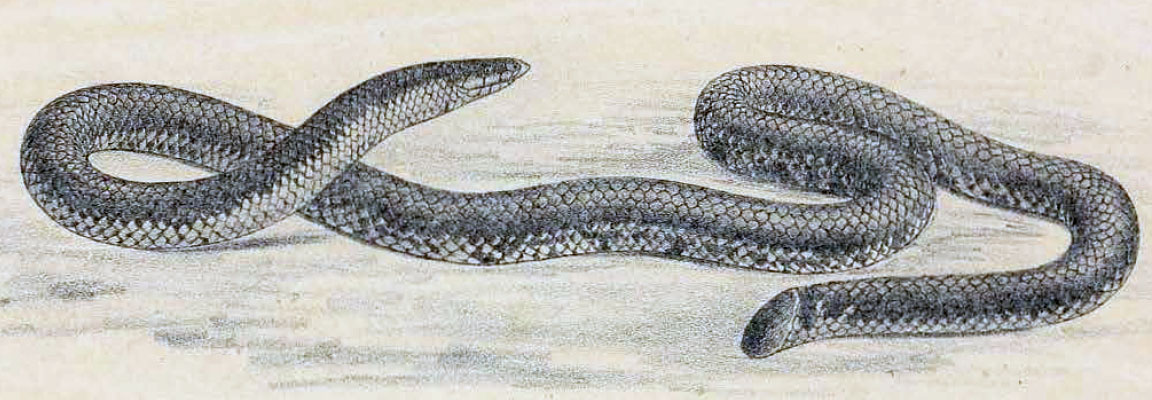
Illustration

====== Rhinophis sanguineus (red-bellied shieldtail) ======
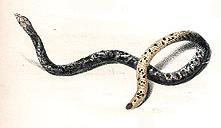
Illustration

===== Genus: Uropeltis =====
====== Uropeltis ceylanica (Kerala shieldtail) ======
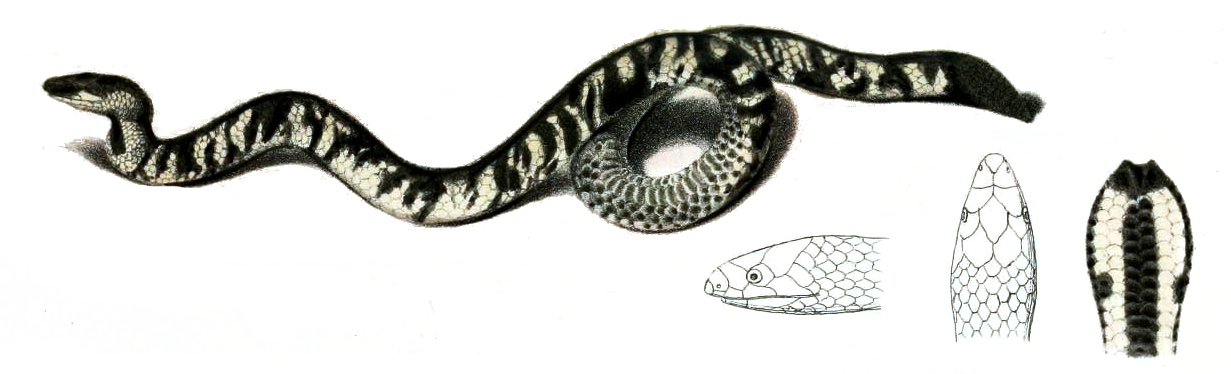
Illustration

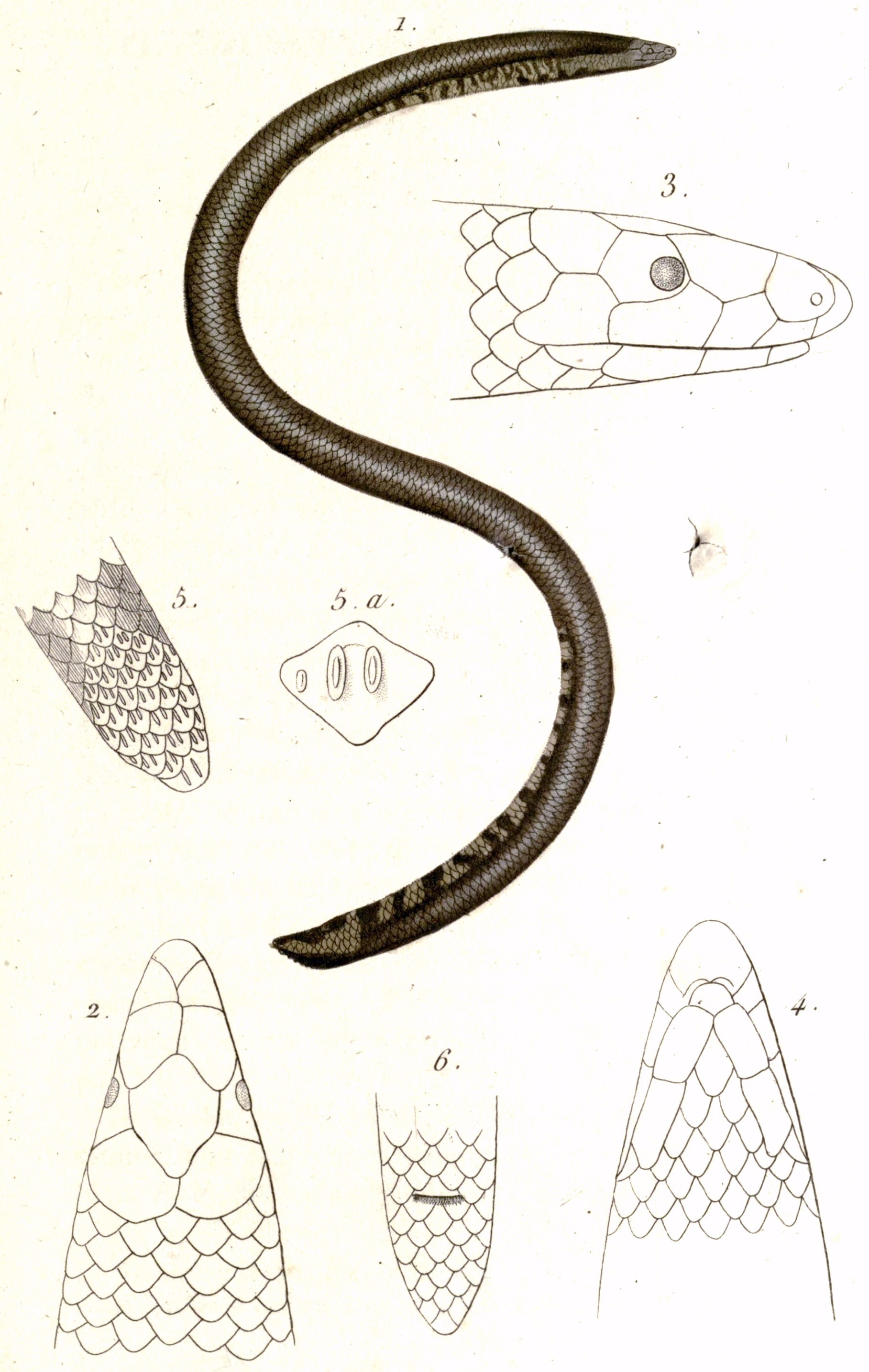
Illustration

====== Uropeltis liura (Günther's earth snake) ======
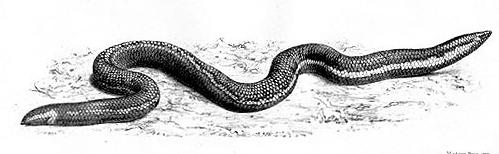
Illustration

====== Uropeltis pulneyensis (Palni shieldtail / പഴനിപ്പാമ്പ്) ======
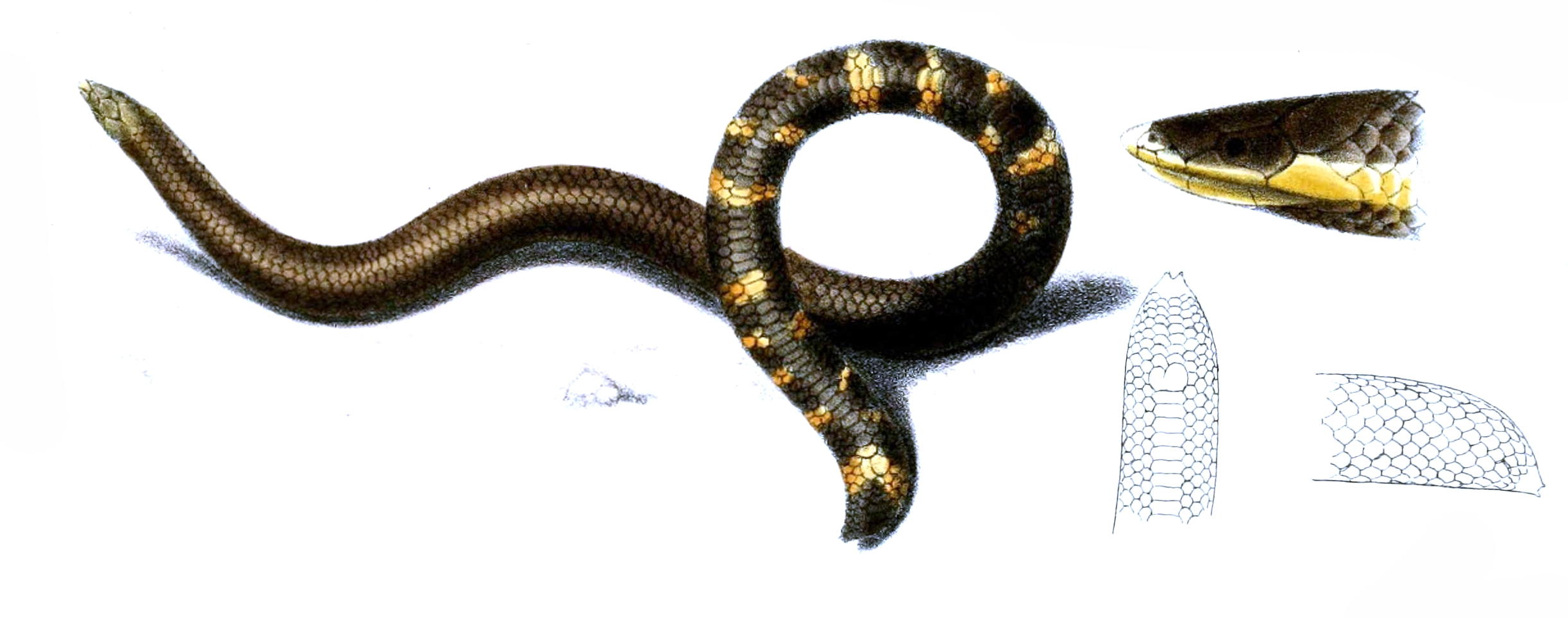
Illustration

====== Uropeltis rubromaculata/rubromaculatus (red-spotted shieldtail / കുങ്കുമപ്പൊട്ടൻ പാമ്പ്) ======
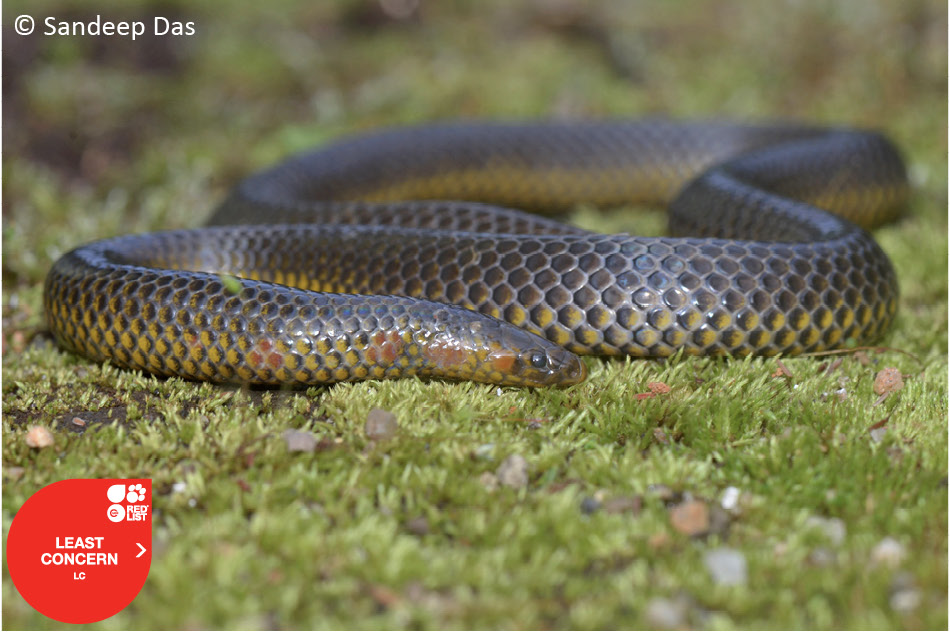
Lateral view

==== Family: Viperidae (vipers) ====
===== Genus: Daboia =====
====== Daboia russelii (Russell's viper / അണലി) ======
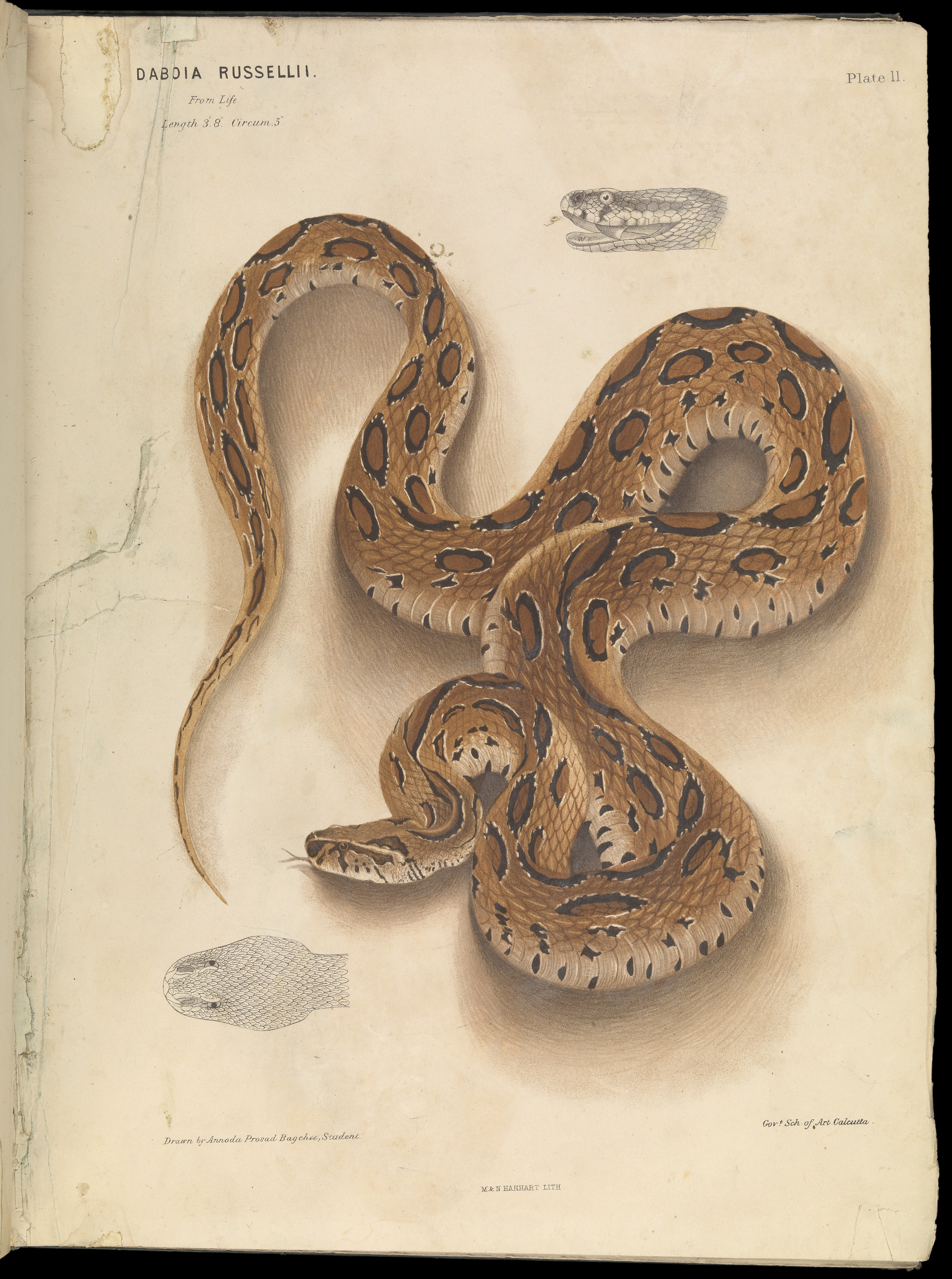
Illustration

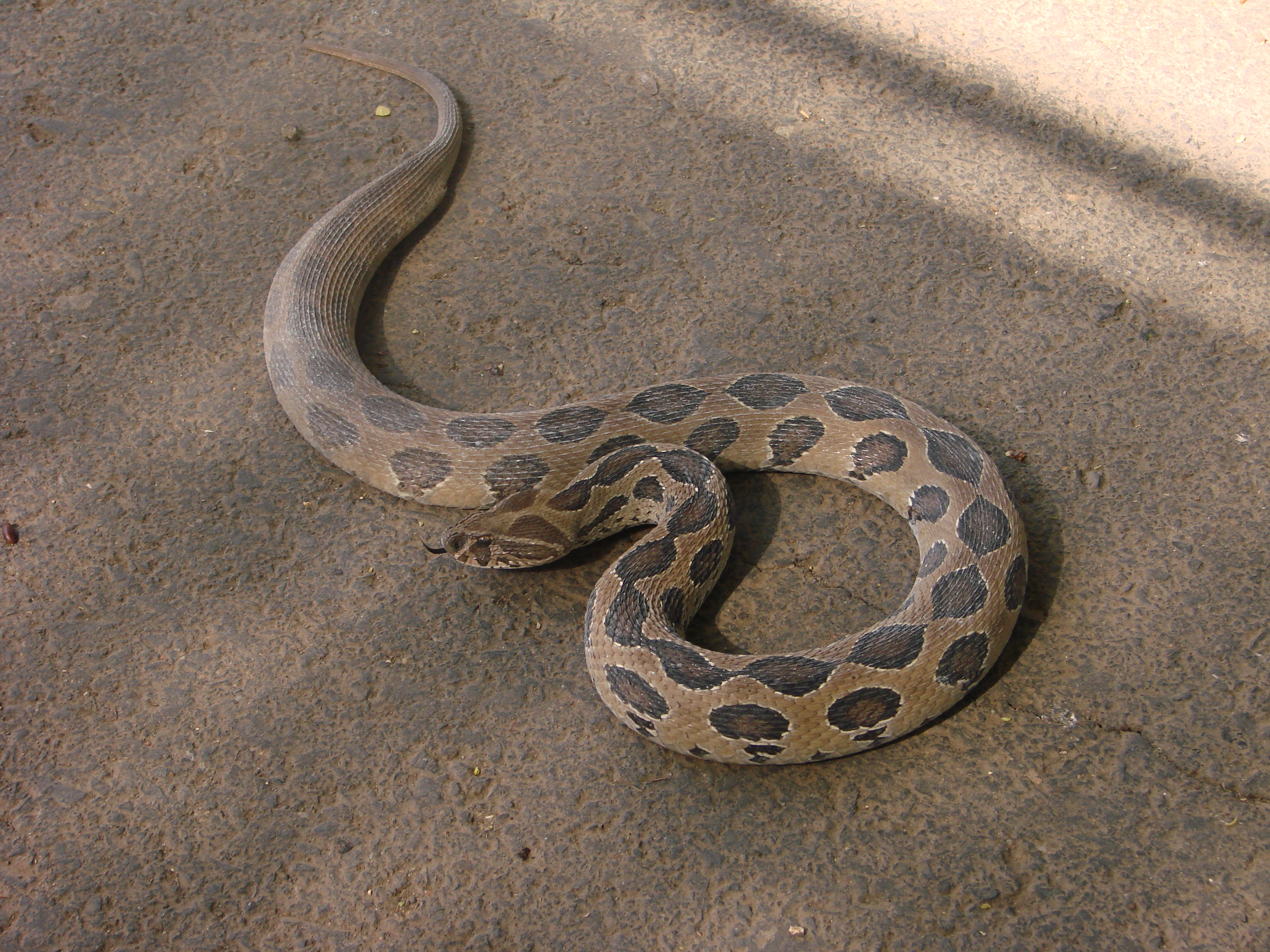
Dorsal view

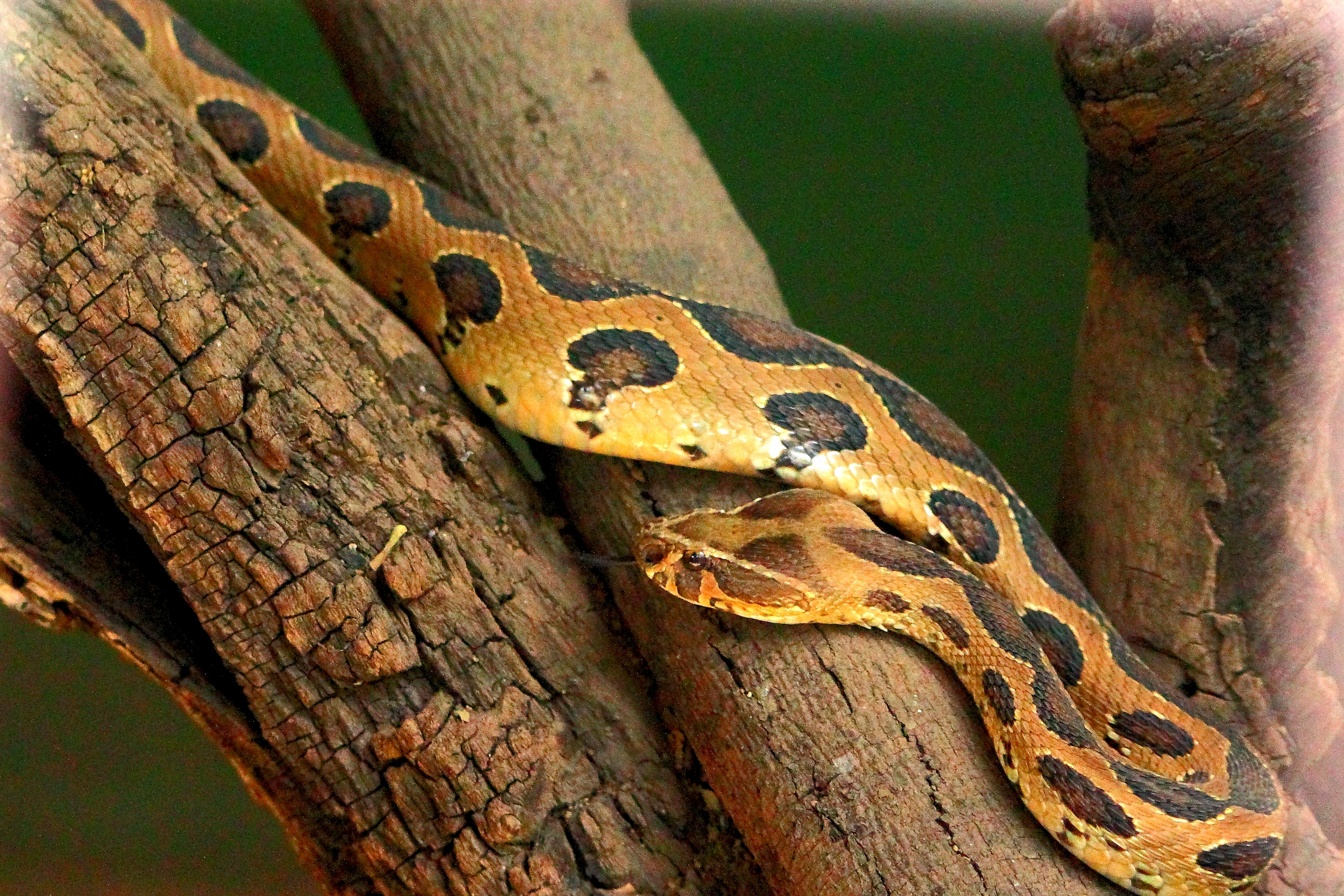
Lateral view

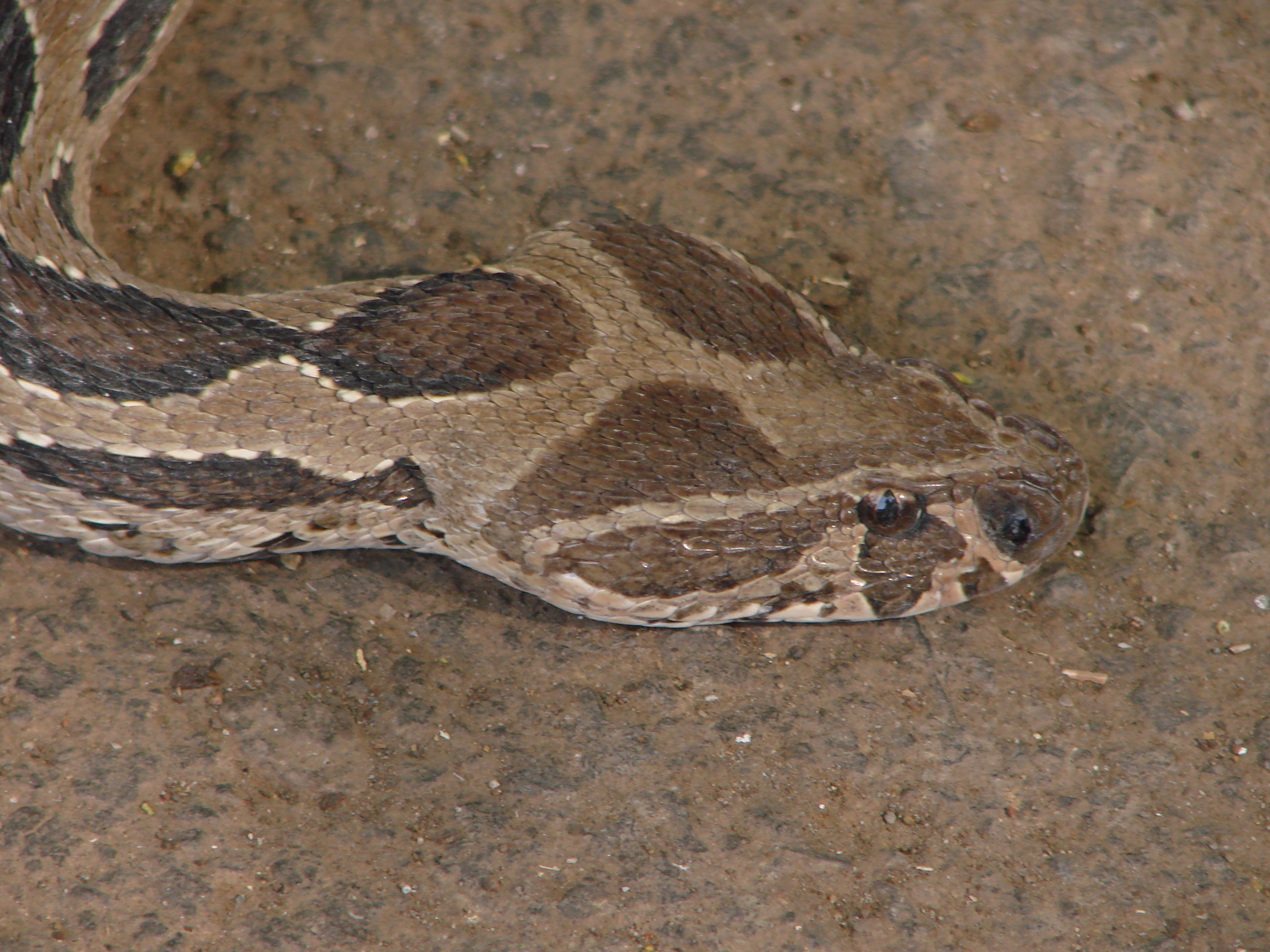
Head

===== Genus: Echis =====
====== Echis carinatus (saw-scaled viper / ചുരുട്ടമണ്ഡലി) ======
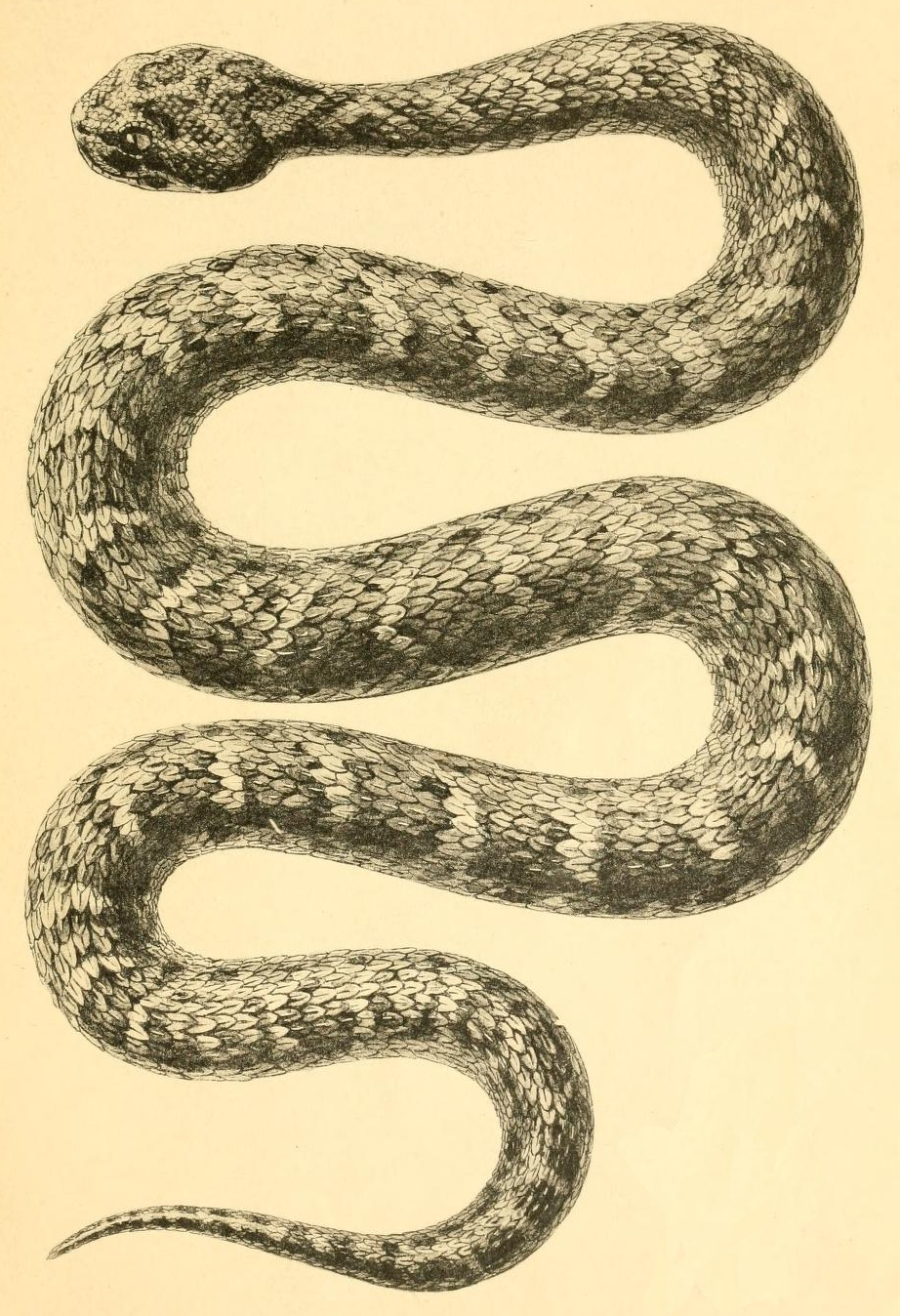
Illustration

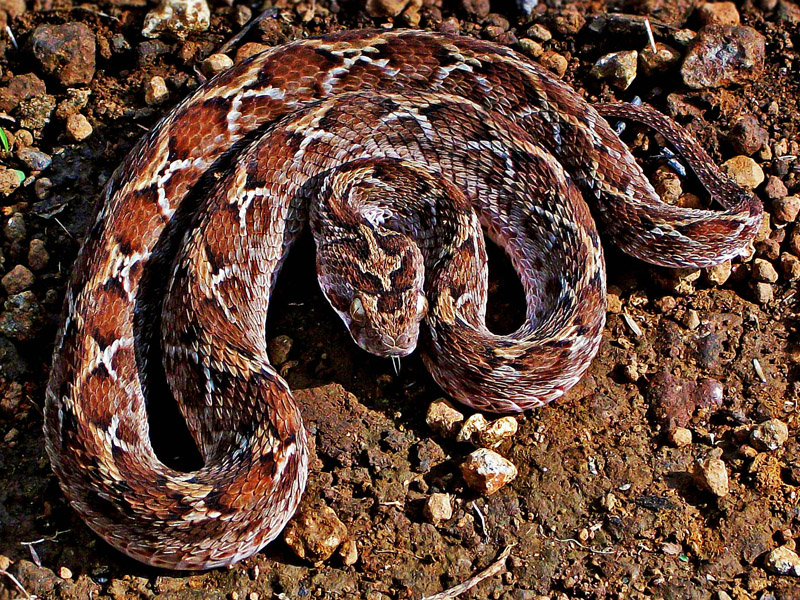
Dorsal view

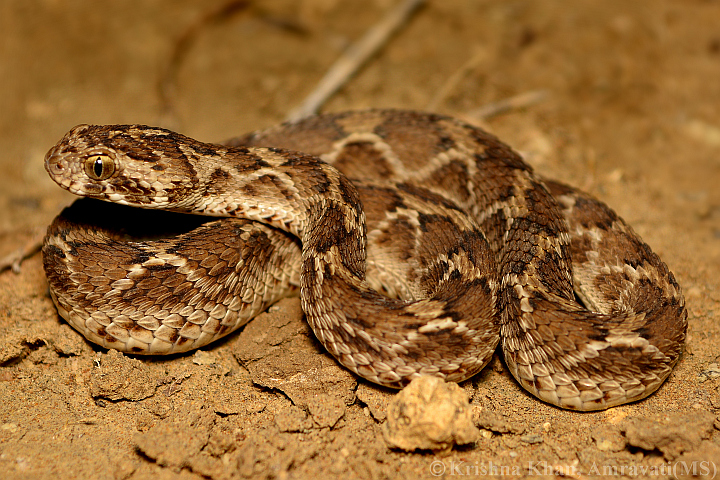
Lateral view

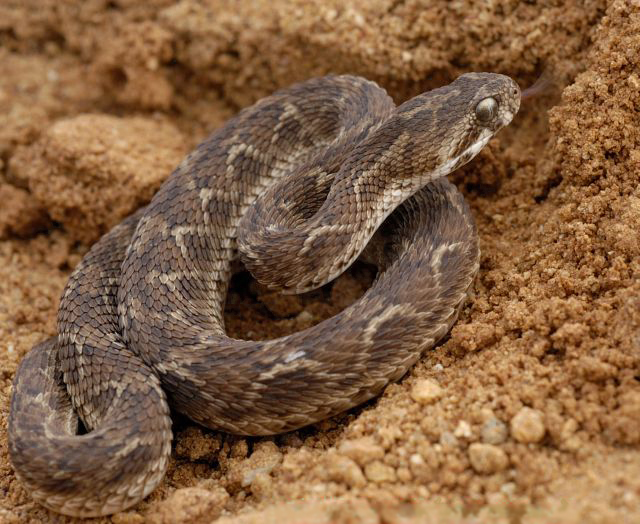
Lateral view

===== Genus: Hypnale =====
====== Hypnale hypnale (hump-nosed viper / മുഴമൂക്കൻ കുഴിമണ്ഡലി) ======
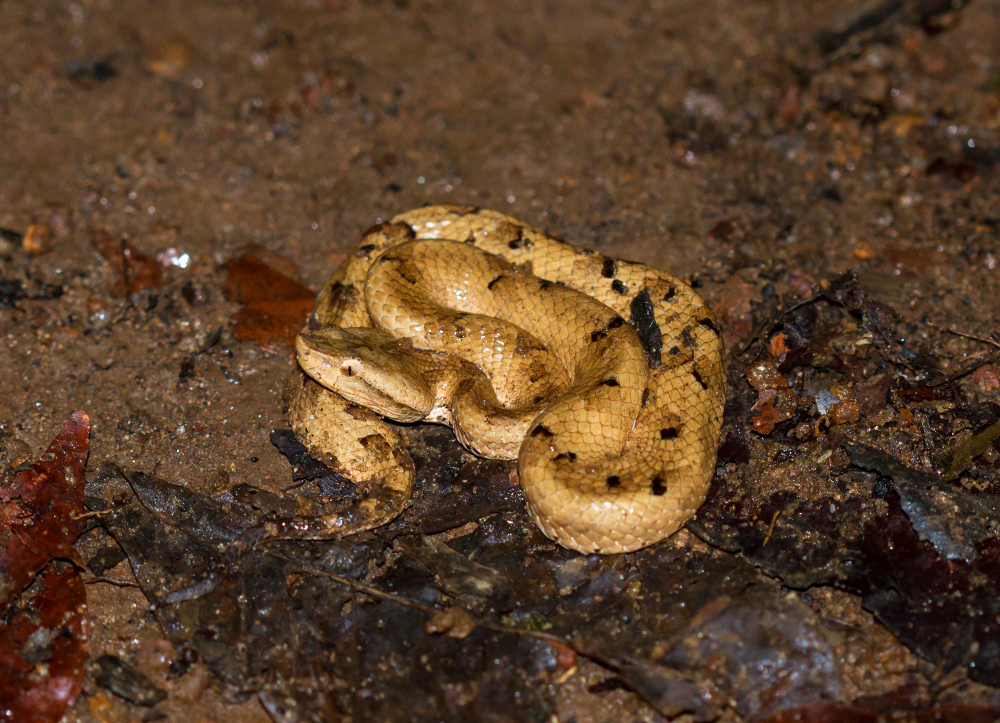
Lateral view

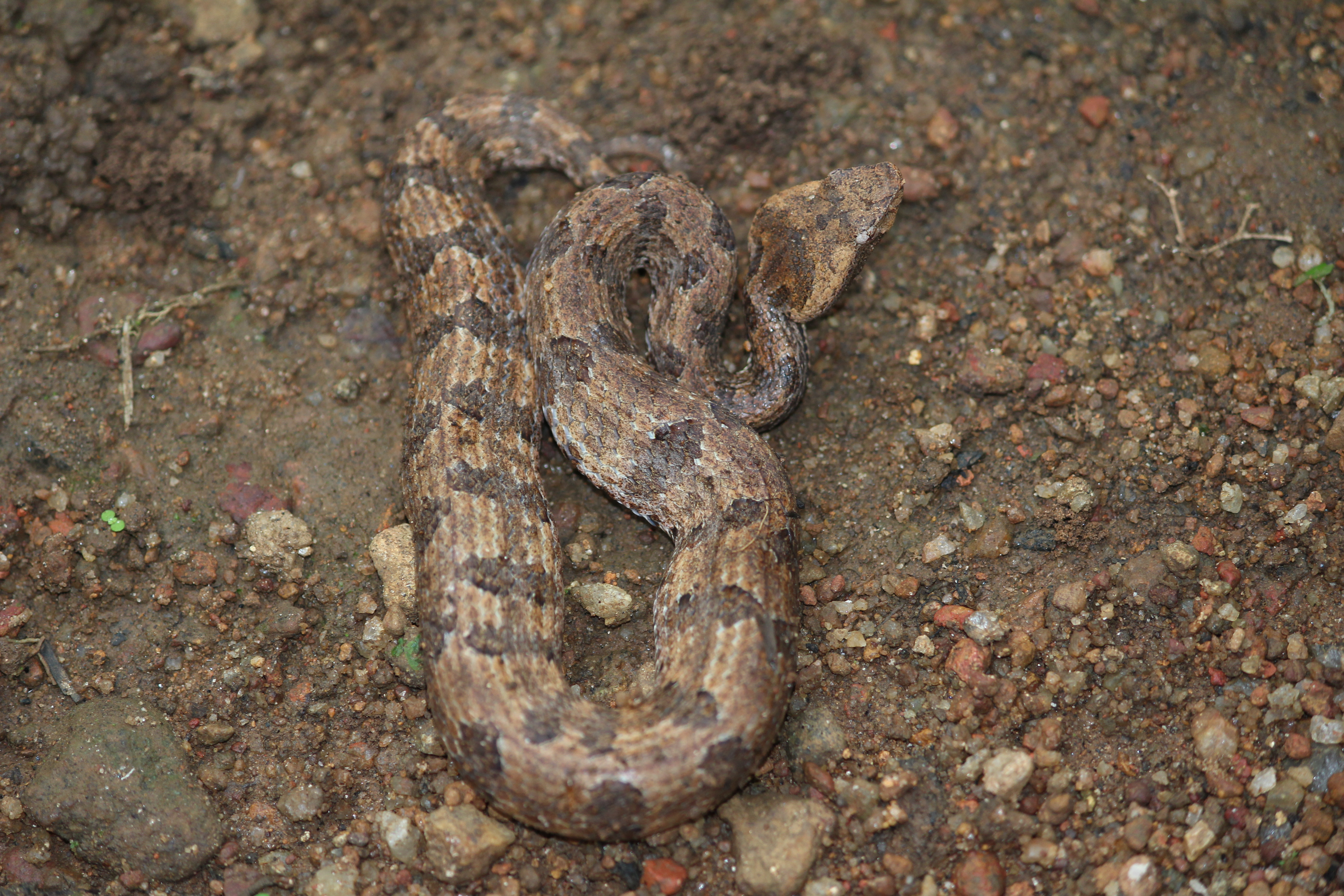
Dorsal view

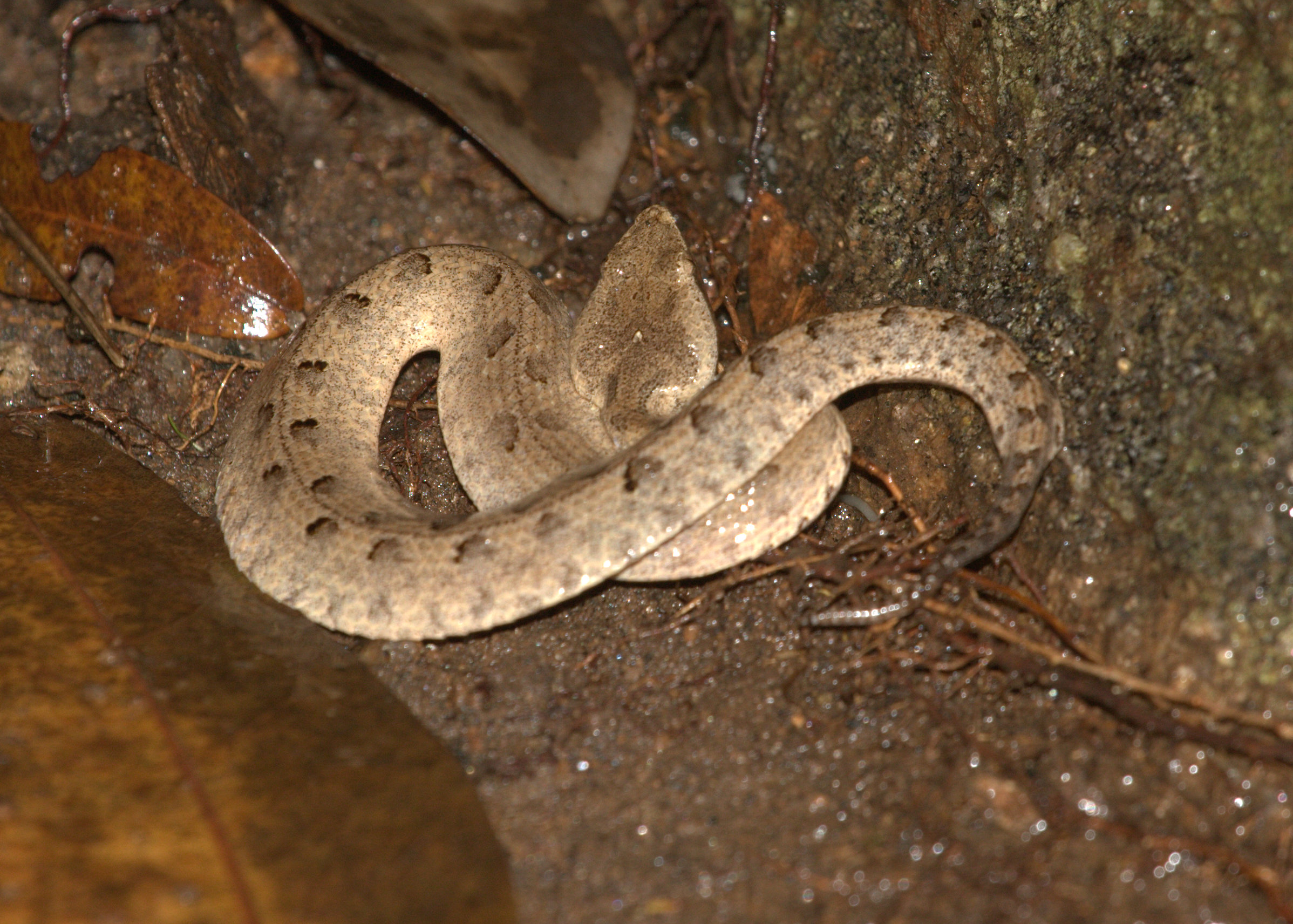
Dorsal view

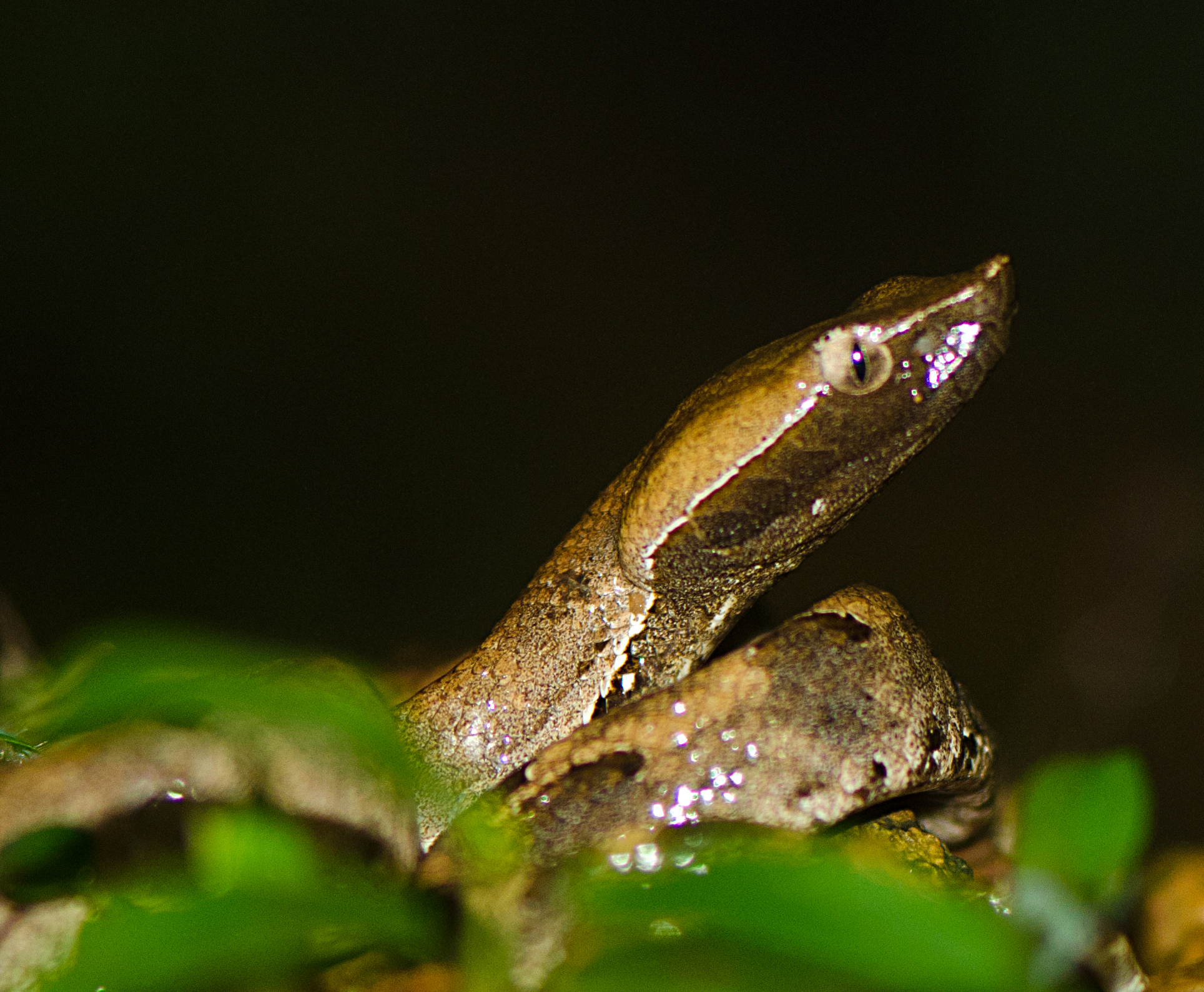
Head

===== Genus: Trimeresurus =====
====== Trimeresurus gramineus (bamboo pit viper / മുളമണ്ഡലി) ======
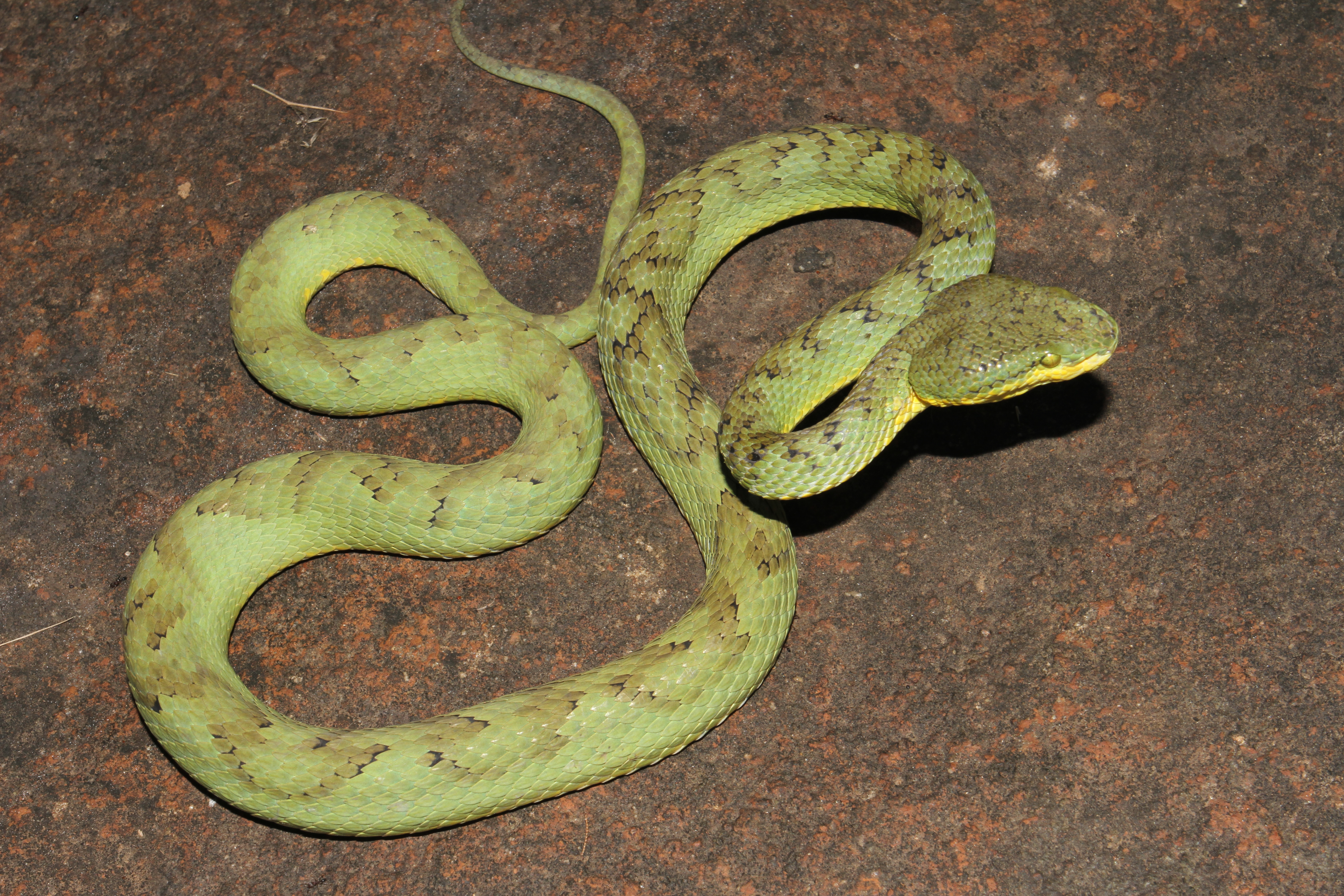
Dorsal view

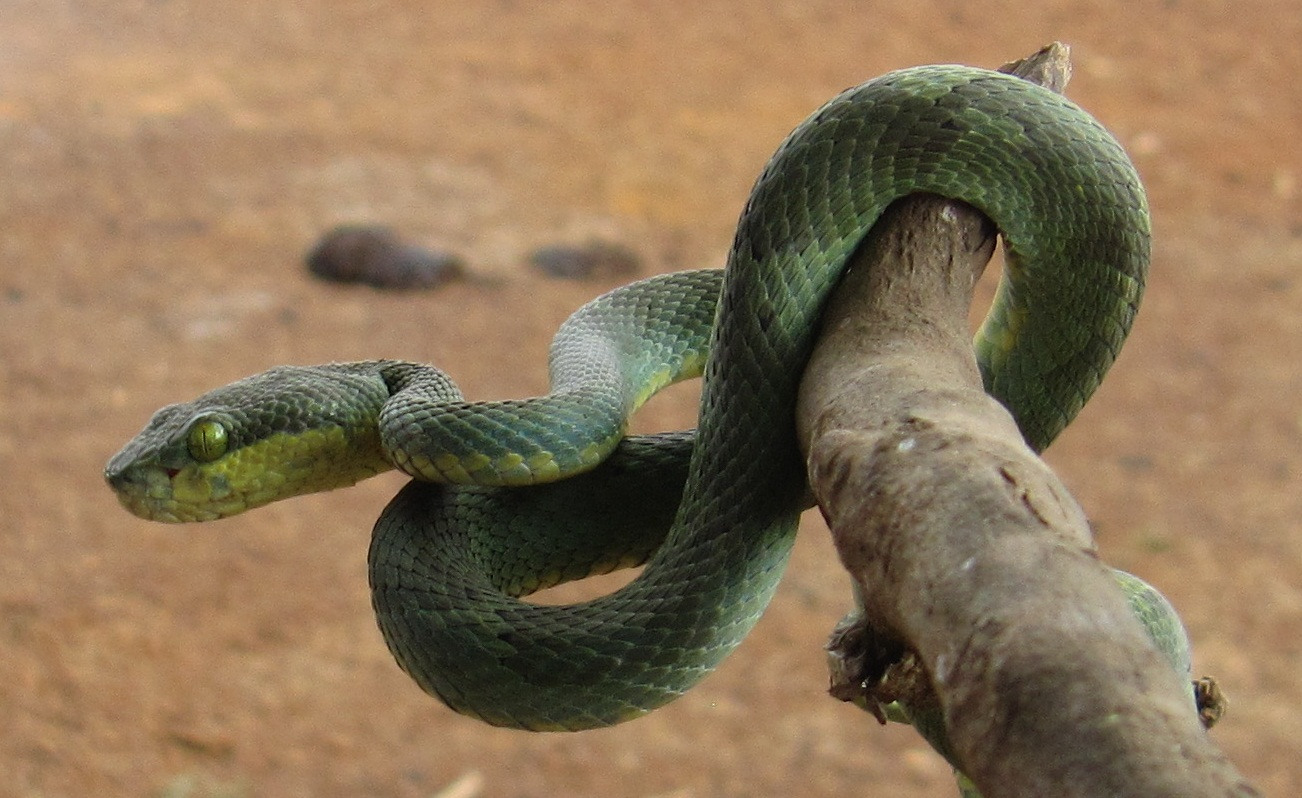
Lateral view

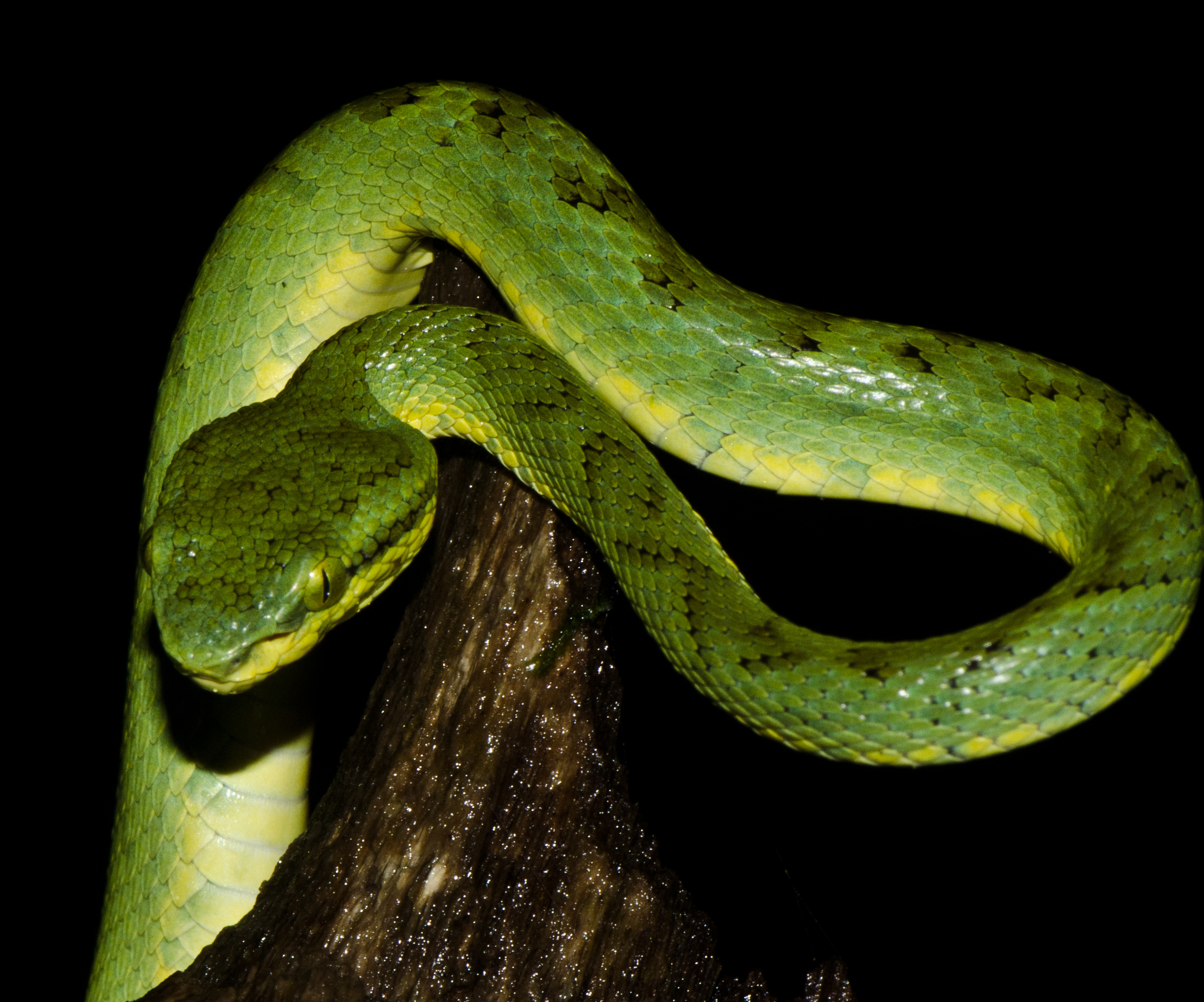
Front view

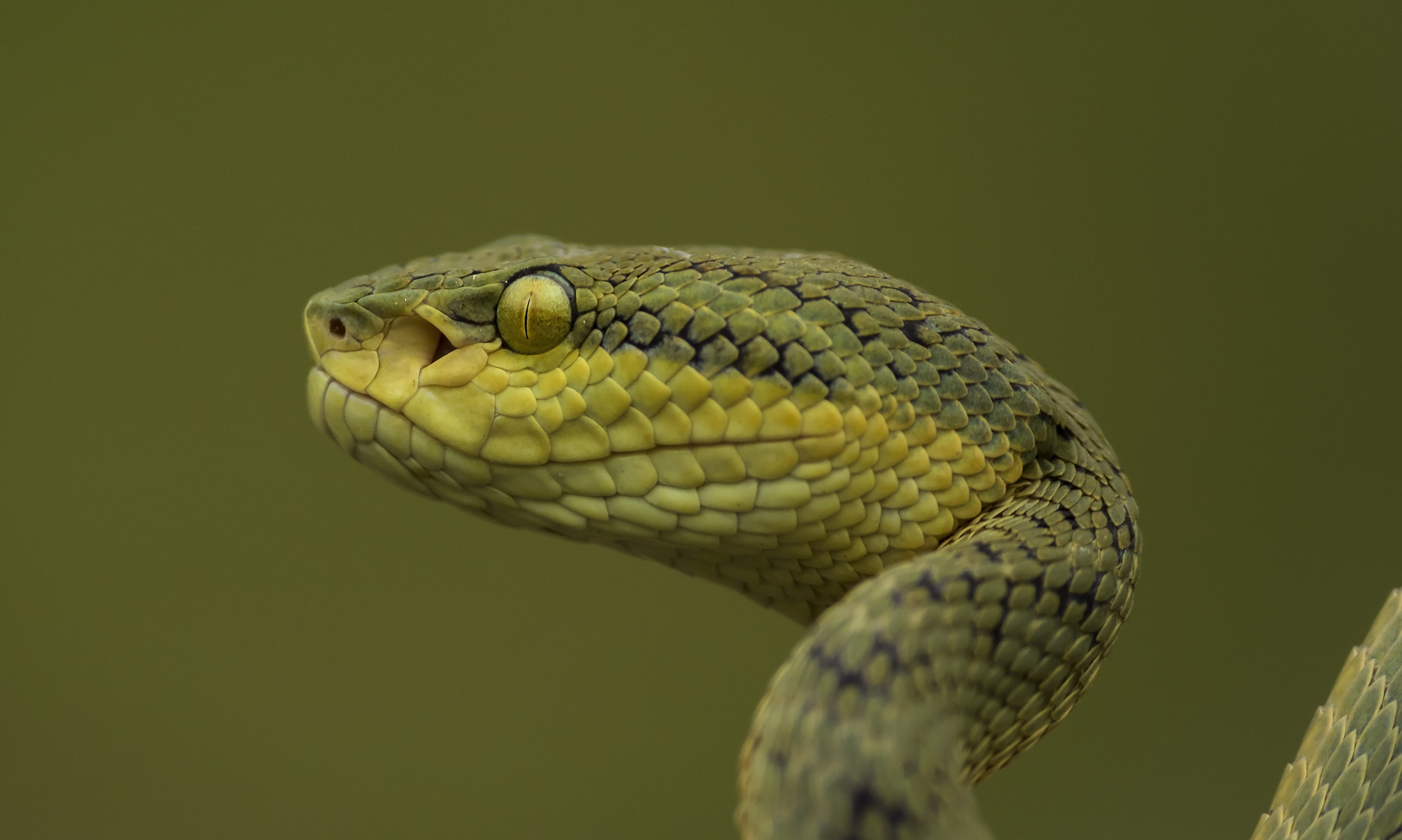
Head

====== Trimeresurus macrolepis (large-scaled pit viper / ചട്ടിത്തലയൻ കുഴിമണ്ഡലി) ======
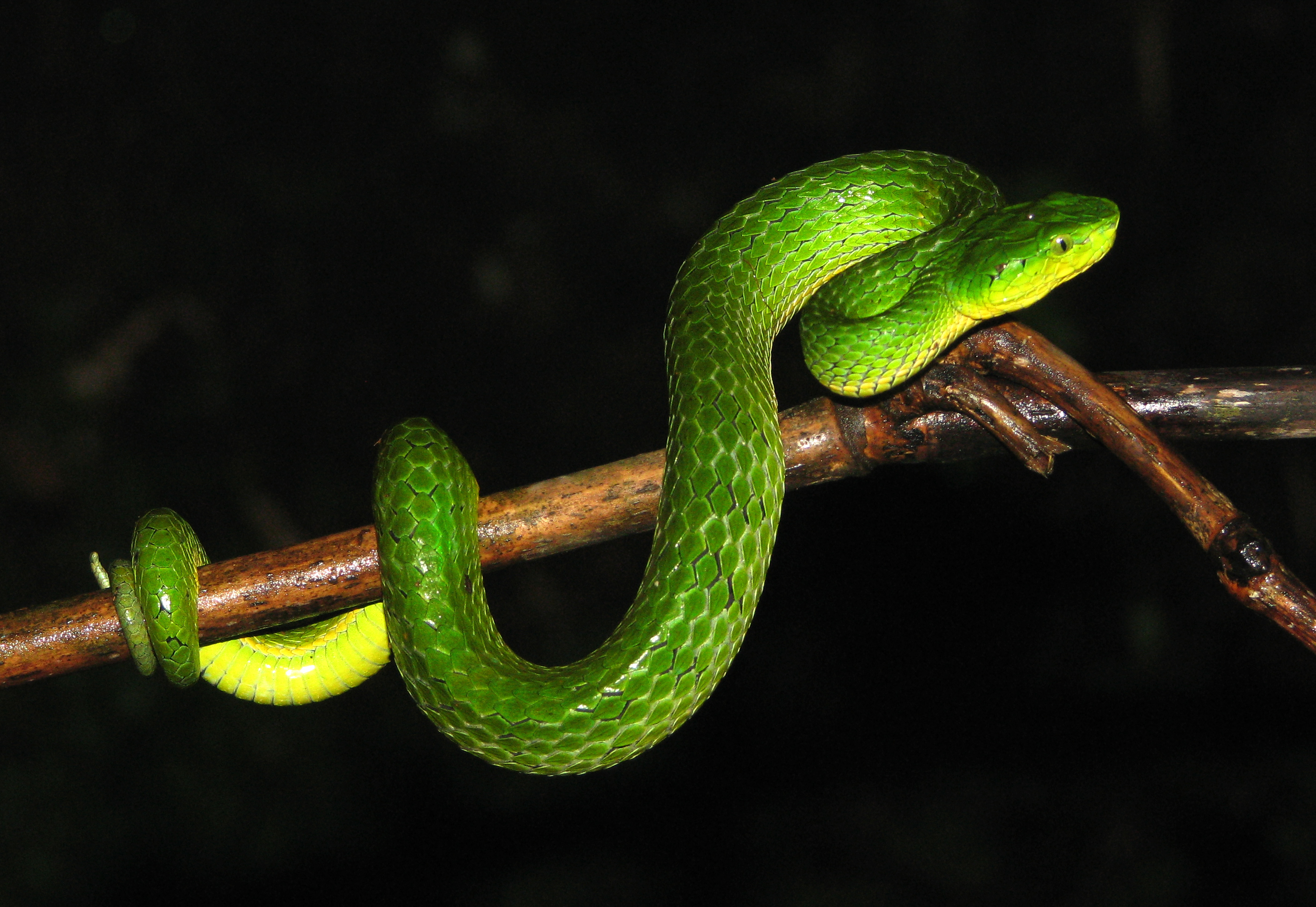
Lateral view

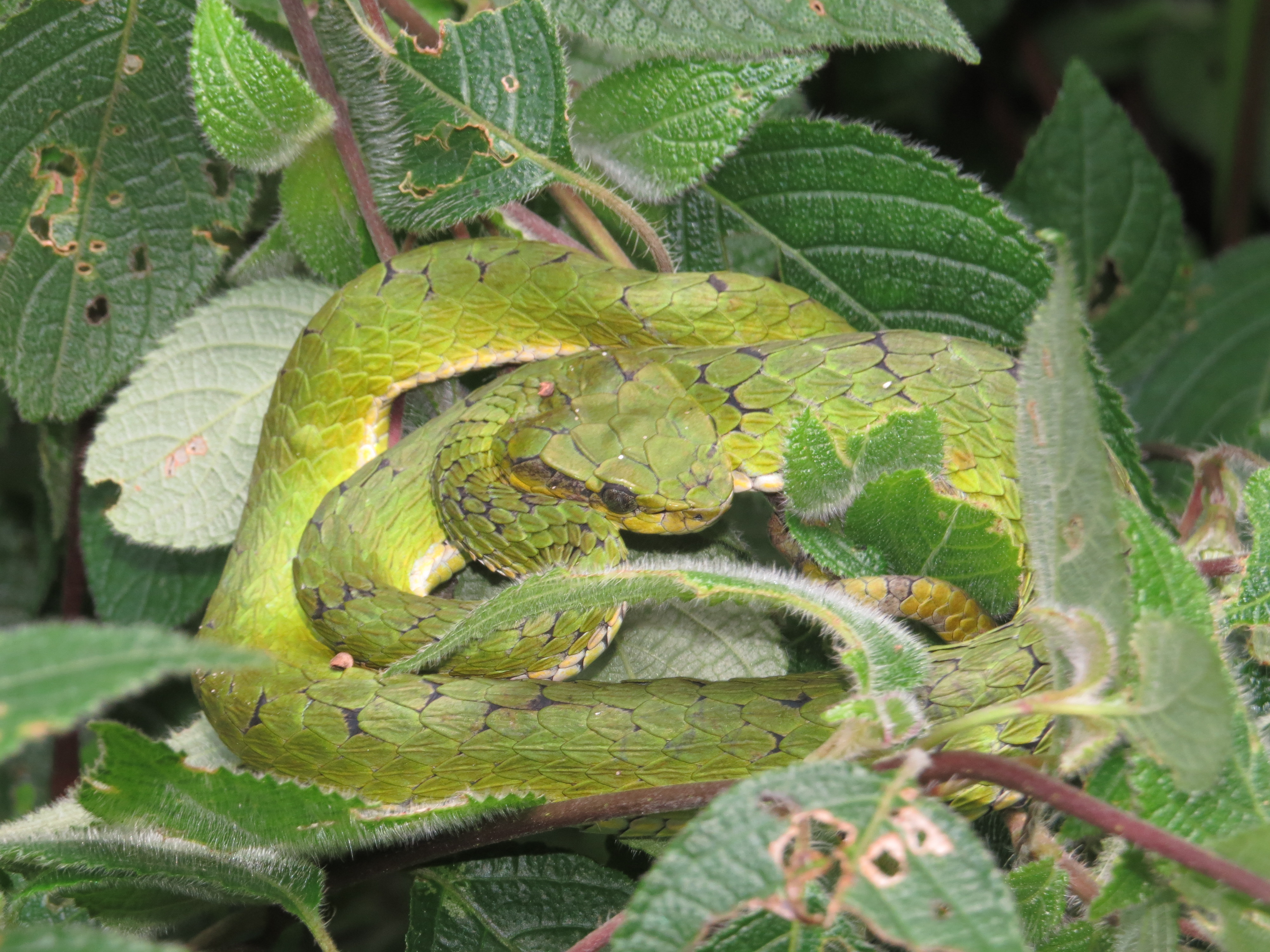
Lateral view

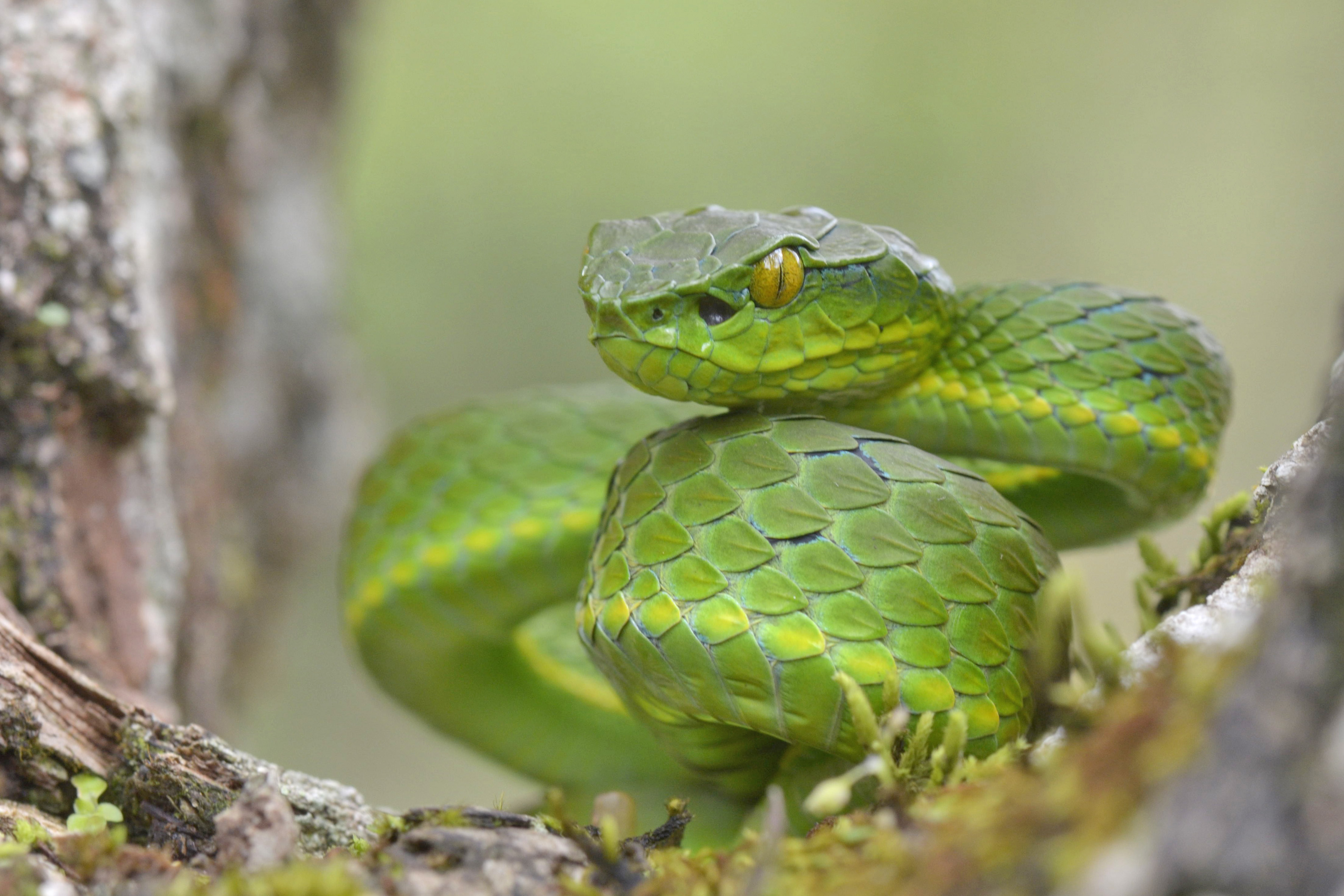
Front view

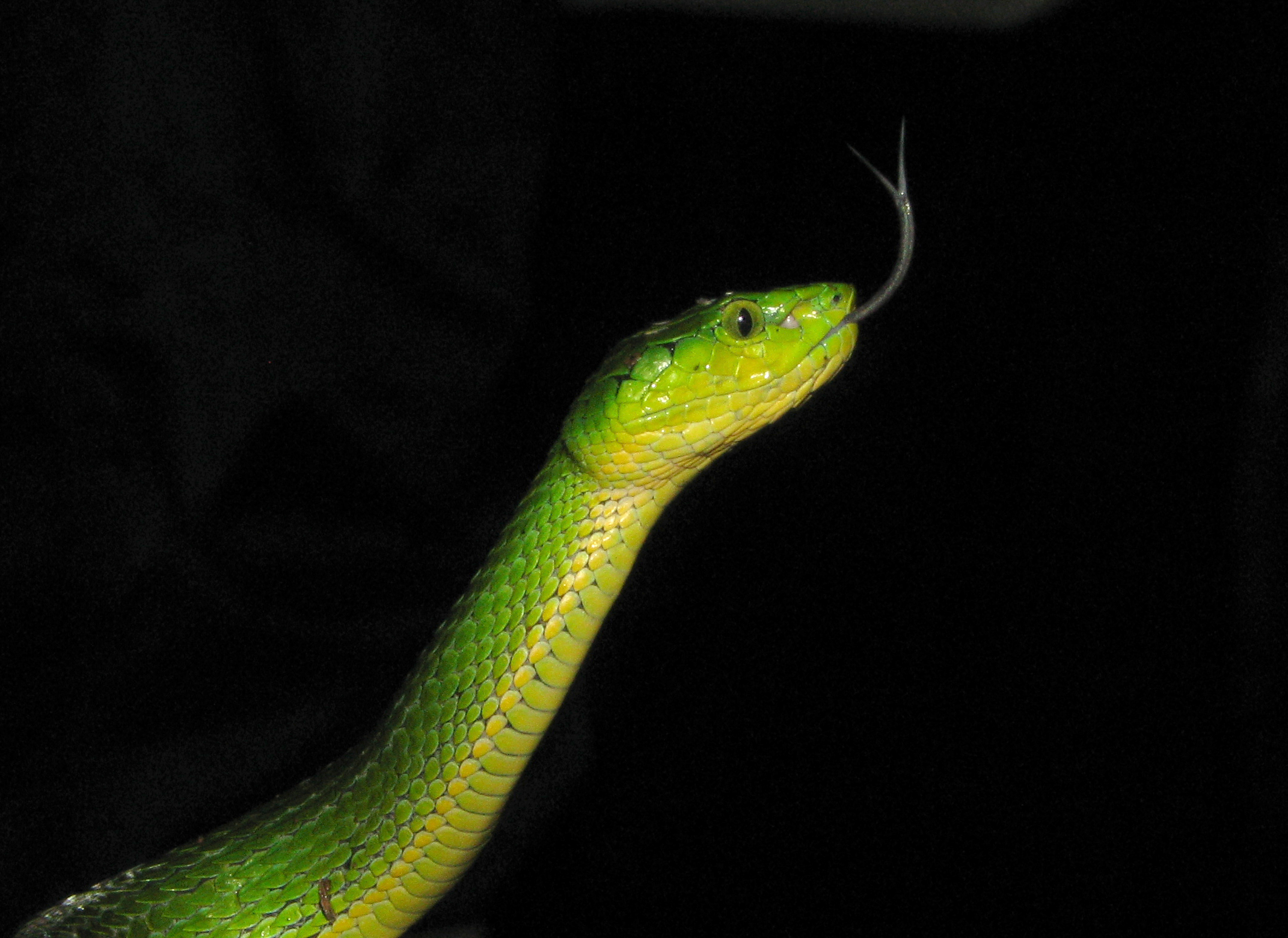
Head

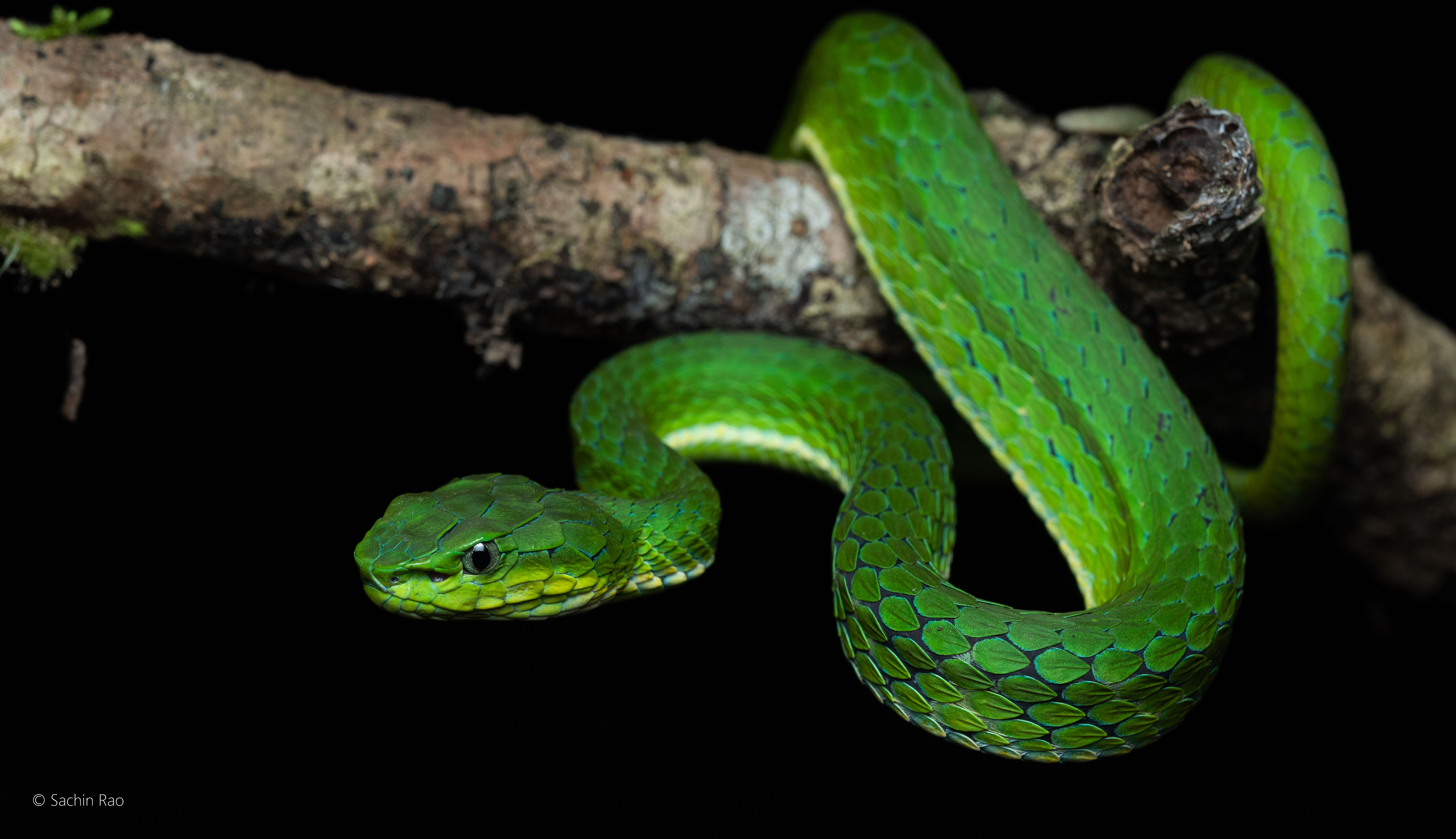
Large scaled pit viper

====== Trimeresurus malabaricus (Malabar pit viper / ചോലമണ്ഡലി) ======
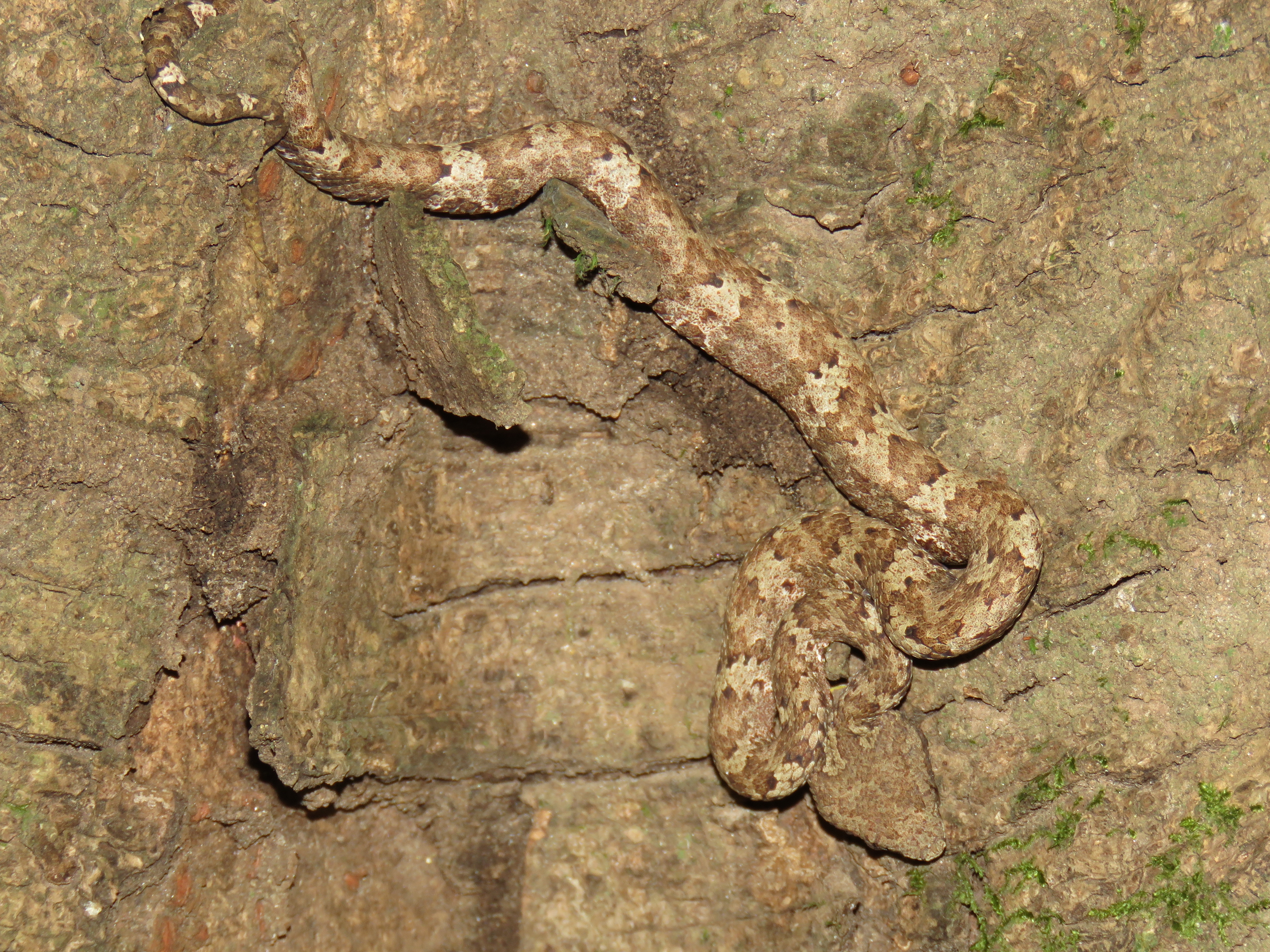
Dorsal view

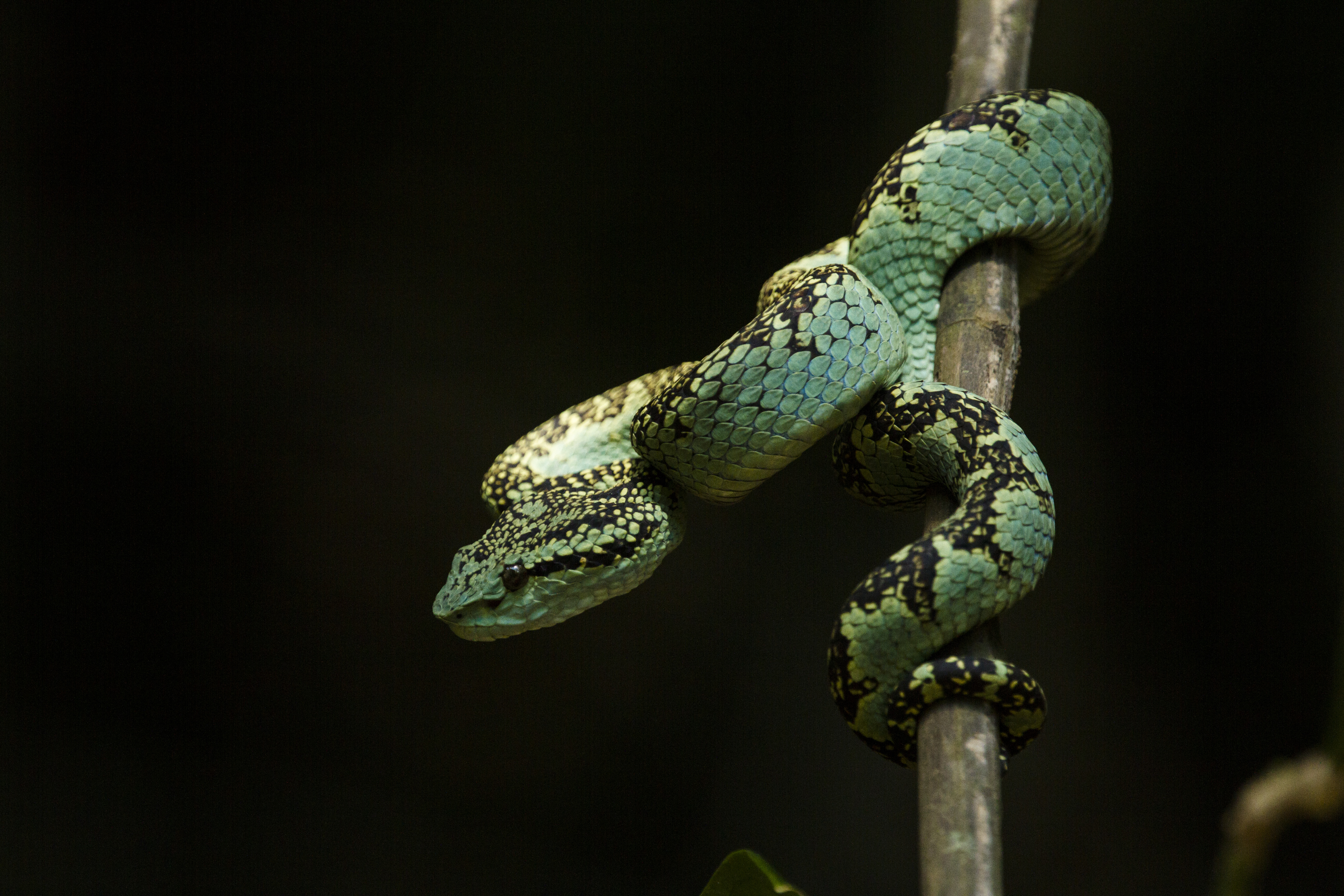
Lateral view

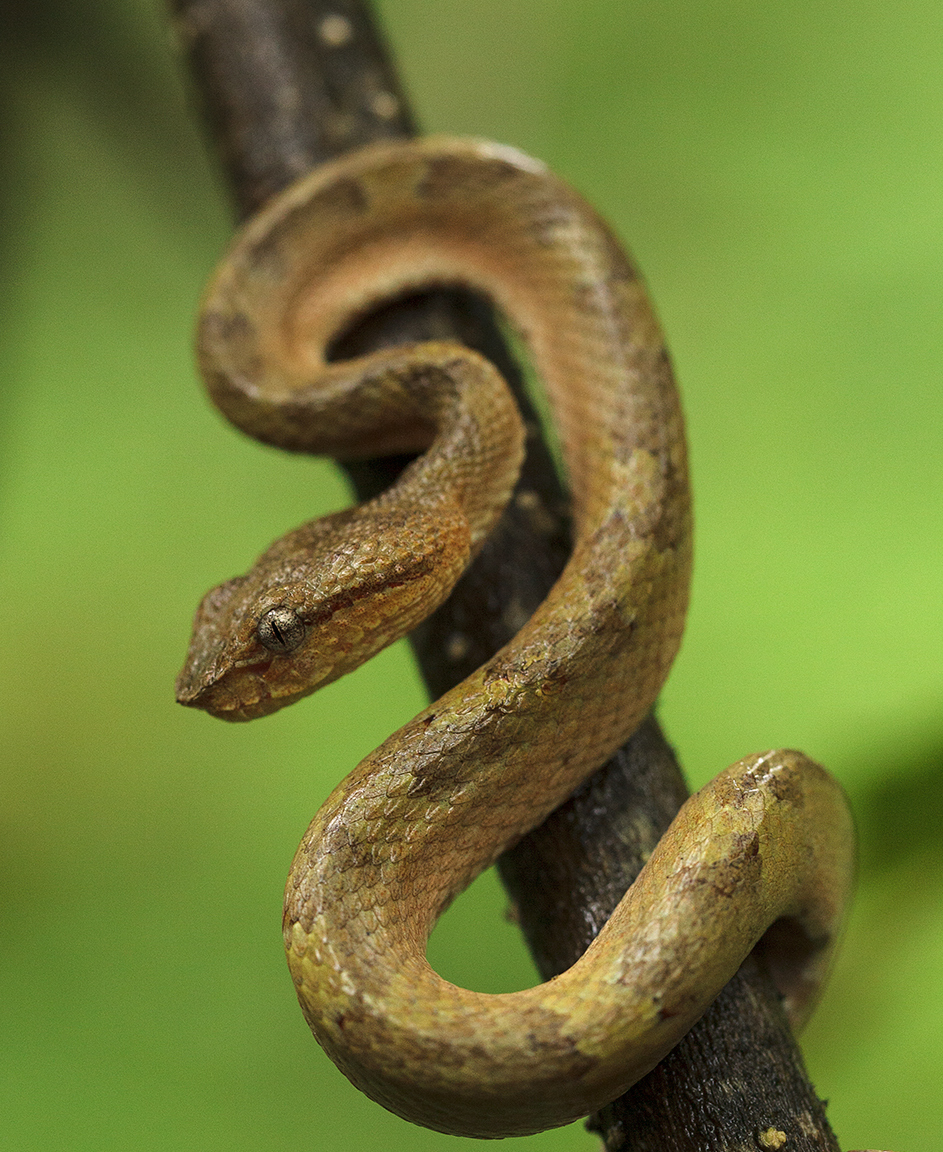
Lateral view

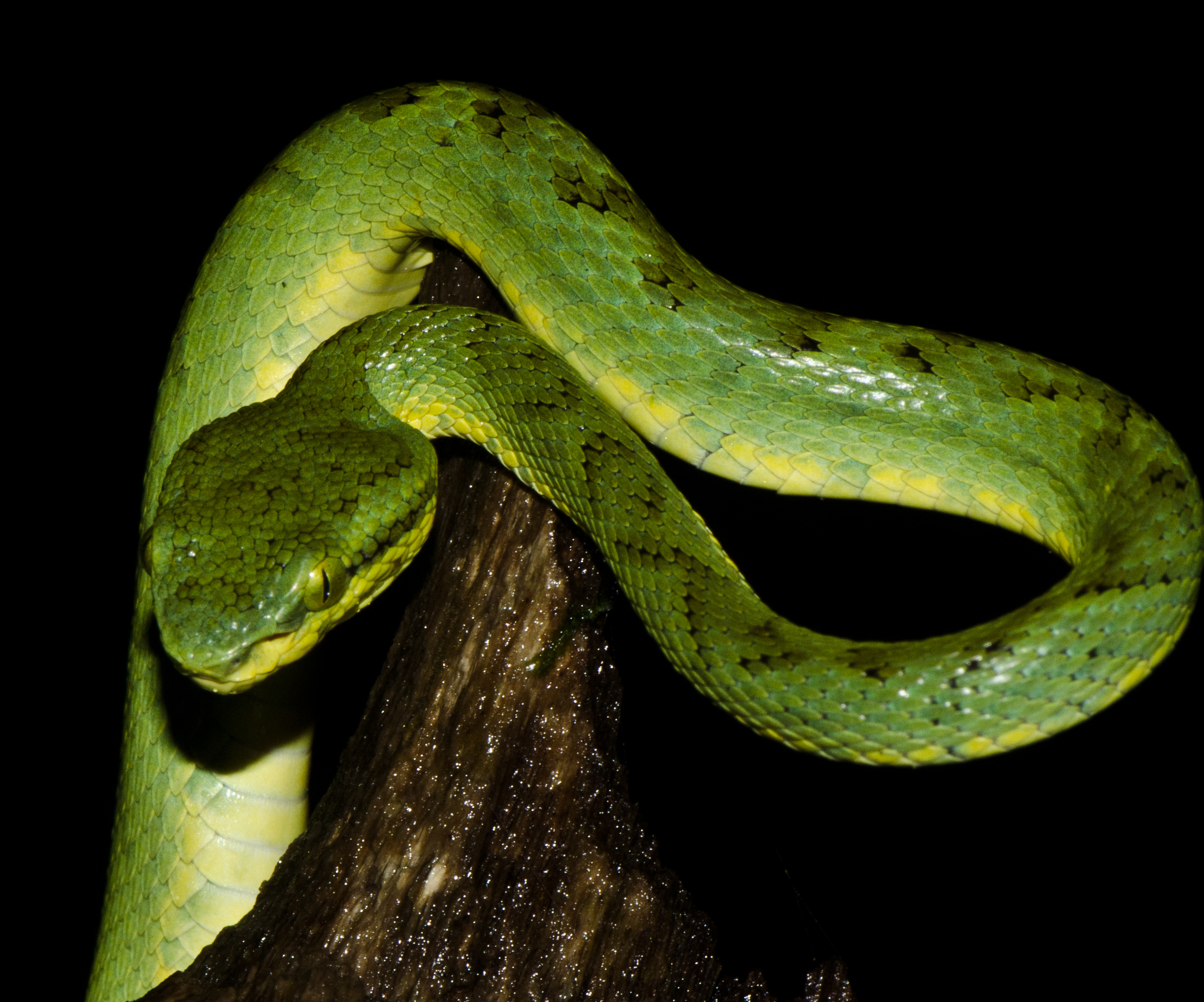
Front view

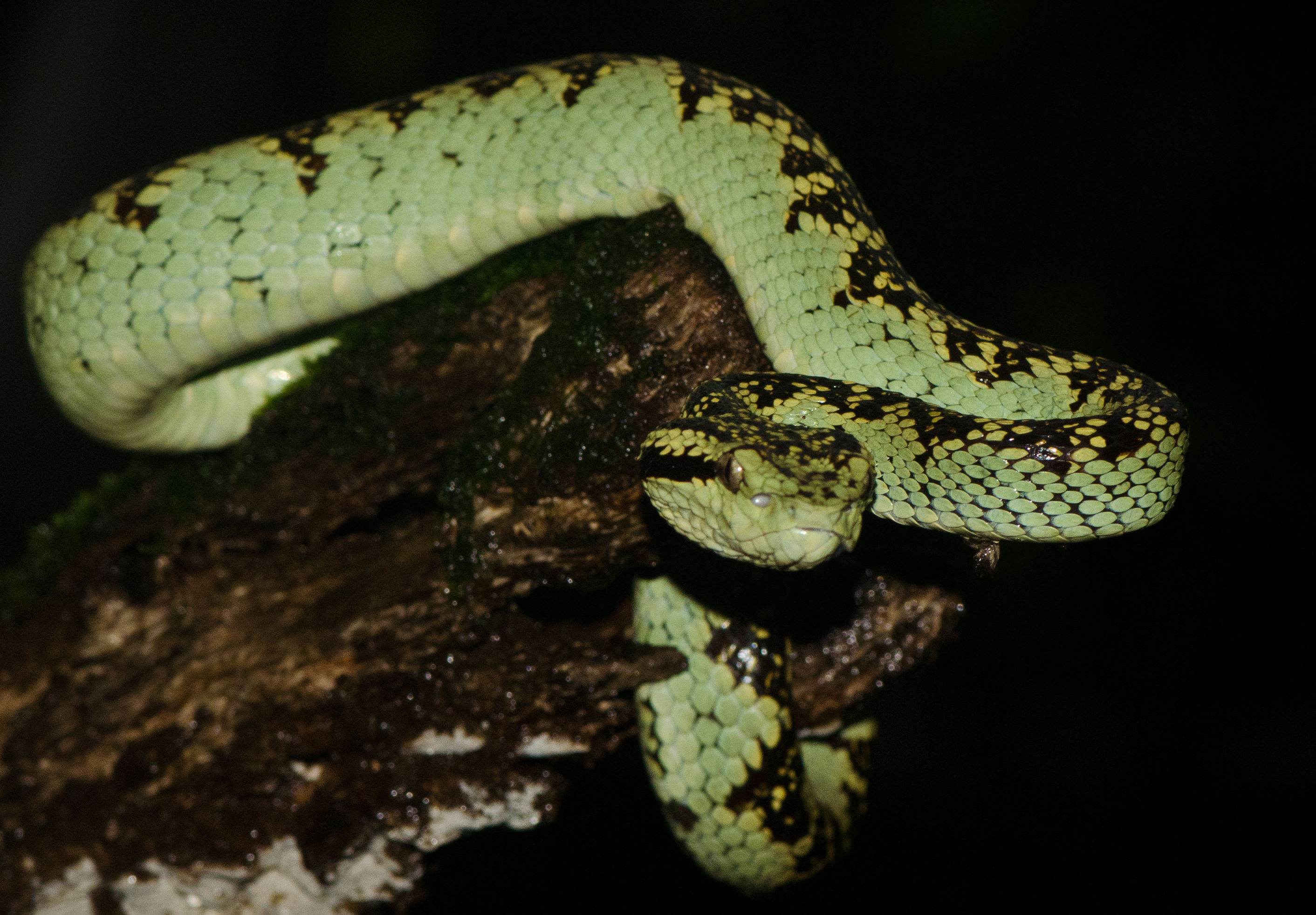
Head

==== Family: Xenodermatidae (narrow-headed snakes) ====
===== Genus: Xylophis =====
====== Xylophis perroteti (Perrotet's mountain snake) ======
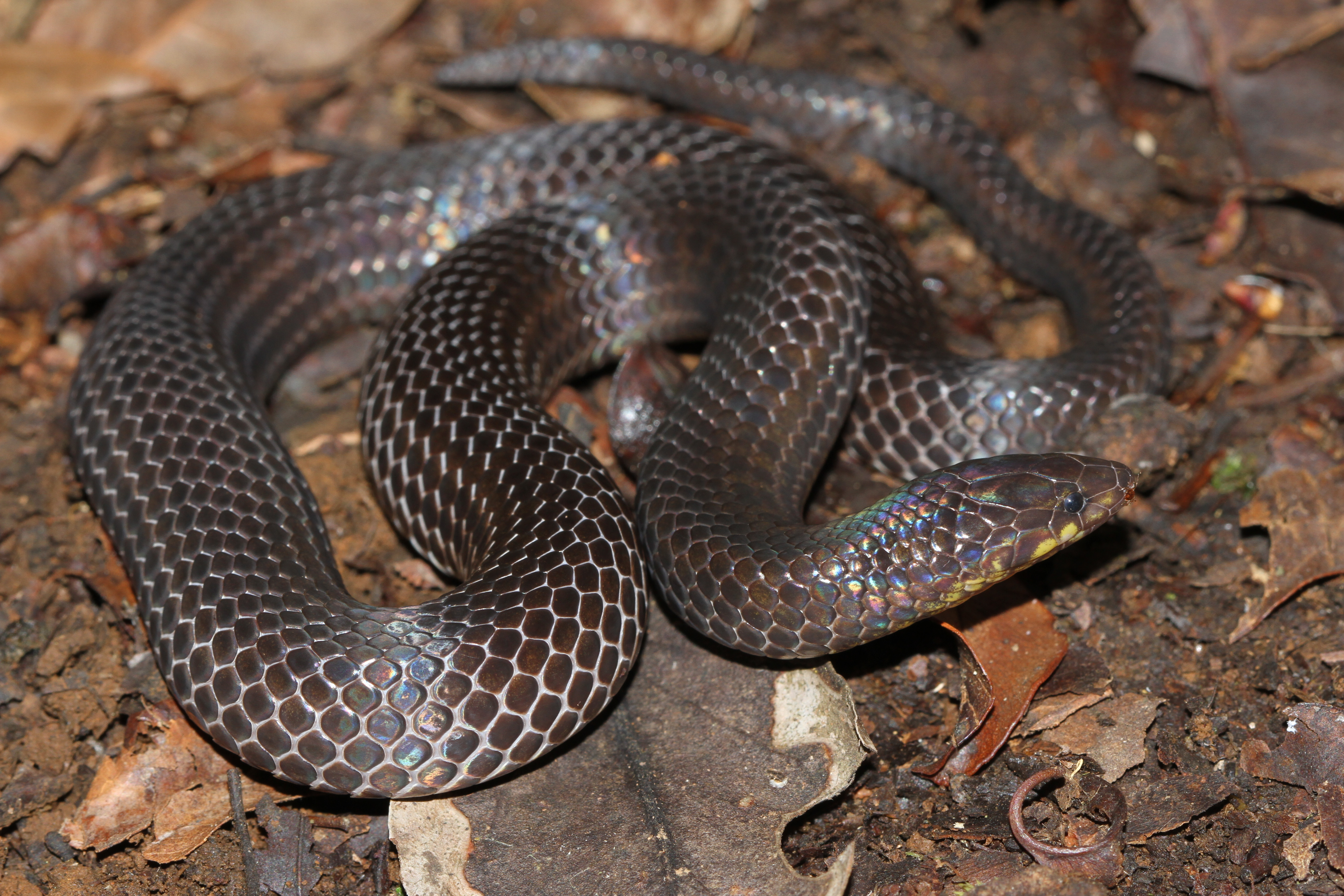
Lateral view

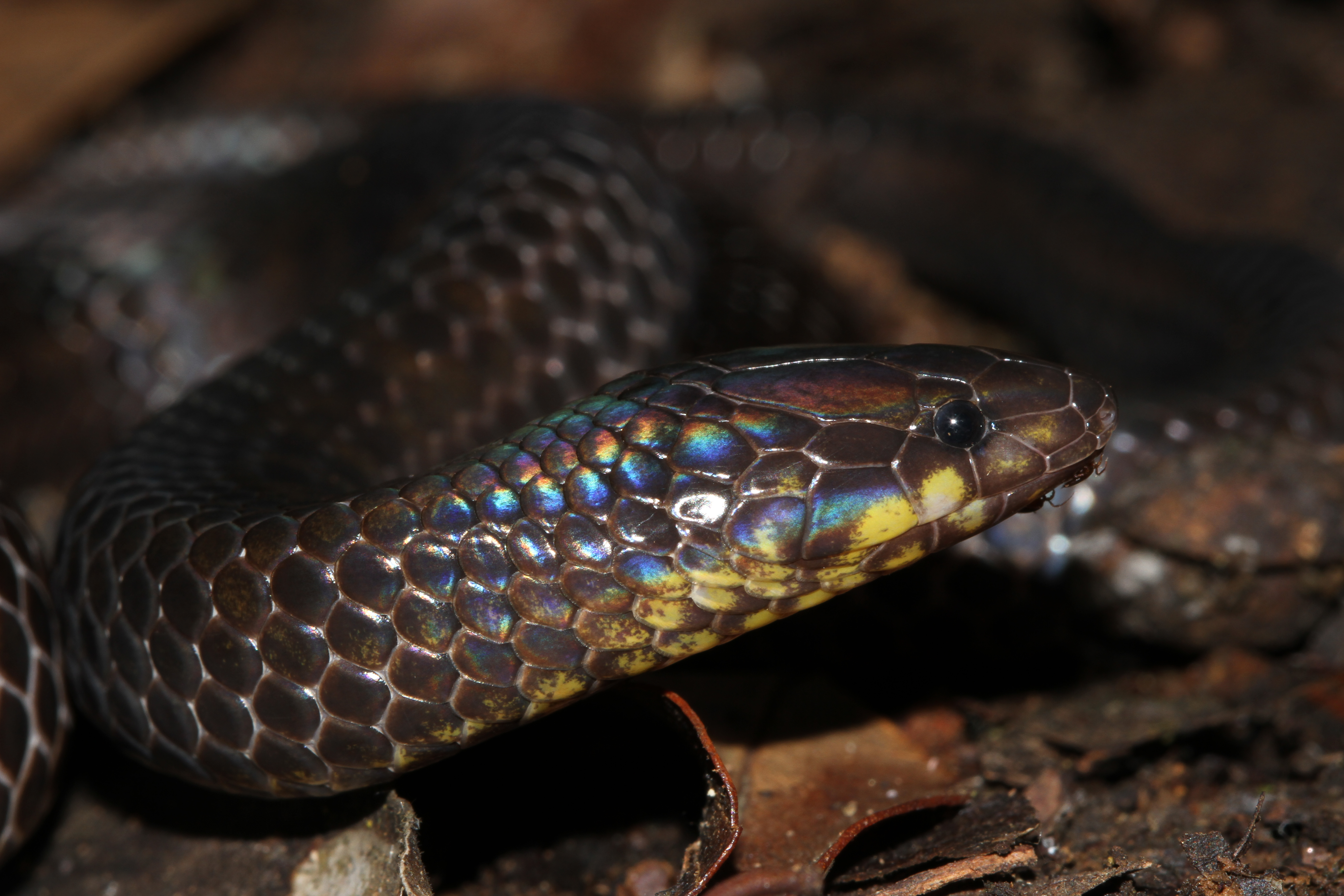
Head

== See also ==
- Wildlife of Kerala
- List of Odonata of Kerala
- List of butterflies of Kerala
- List of amphibians of Kerala
- List of birds of Kerala
- List of mammals of Kerala
