= Cnemaspis leucura =

Scientific classification
- Kingdom: Animalia
- Phylum: Chordata
- Class: Reptilia
- Order: Squamata
- Suborder: Gekkota
- Family: Gekkonidae
- Genus: Cnemaspis
- Species: C. leucura

Binomial name
- Cnemaspis leucura Kurita, Nishikawa, Matsui & Hikida, 2017

Species of lizard

Cnemaspis leucura, also known as the curse rock gecko, is a species of gecko endemic to Sarawak on Borneo.
