= Cnemaspis tapanuli =

Scientific classification
- Kingdom: Animalia
- Phylum: Chordata
- Class: Reptilia
- Order: Squamata
- Suborder: Gekkota
- Family: Gekkonidae
- Genus: Cnemaspis
- Species: C. tapanuli

Binomial name
- Cnemaspis tapanuli Iskandar, McGuire & Amarsinghe, 2017

Species of lizard

Cnemaspis tapanuli is a species of gecko endemic to northern Sumatra in Indonesia.
