= Cnemaspis manoae =

Scientific classification
- Kingdom: Animalia
- Phylum: Chordata
- Class: Reptilia
- Order: Squamata
- Suborder: Gekkota
- Family: Gekkonidae
- Genus: Cnemaspis
- Species: C. manoae

Binomial name
- Cnemaspis manoae Amarasinghe & Karunarathna, 2020

Species of lizard

Cnemaspis manoae, commonly known as Mano's day gecko, is a species of diurnal, rock-dwelling, insectivorous gecko endemic to Sri Lanka.

== Etymology ==
The gecko was named by Amarasinghe in recognition of his high school biology teacher, Mano Kalupahana, who encouraged him to study zoology.
