= Cnemaspis tubaensis =

Scientific classification
- Kingdom: Animalia
- Phylum: Chordata
- Class: Reptilia
- Order: Squamata
- Suborder: Gekkota
- Family: Gekkonidae
- Genus: Cnemaspis
- Species: C. tubaensis

Binomial name
- Cnemaspis tubaensis Quah, Wood, Anuar, & Muin, 2020

Species of lizard

Cnemaspis tubaensis is a species of gecko endemic to Malaysia.
