= Dring's rock gecko =

Conservation status
- Data Deficient (IUCN 3.1)

Scientific classification
- Kingdom: Animalia
- Phylum: Chordata
- Class: Reptilia
- Order: Squamata
- Suborder: Gekkota
- Family: Gekkonidae
- Genus: Cnemaspis
- Species: C. dringi

Binomial name
- Cnemaspis dringi Das & Bauer, 1998

Species of lizard

Dring's rock gecko (Cnemaspis dringi), also known commonly as Dring's Borneo rock gecko, is a species of lizard in the family Gekkonidae. The species is endemic to Borneo.

== Etymology ==
The specific name, dringi, is in honor of British herpetologist Julian Christopher Mark Dring (born 1951).

== Habitat ==
The preferred natural habitat of C. dringi is forest, at altitudes of 30–800 m (98–2,625 ft).

== Description ==
C. dringi may attain a snout-to-vent length (SVL) of about 4.5 cm (1.8 in). It has dark flanks with whitish spots.

== Reproduction ==
C. dringi is oviparous.
