= Cnemaspis fantastica =

Scientific classification
- Kingdom: Animalia
- Phylum: Chordata
- Class: Reptilia
- Order: Squamata
- Suborder: Gekkota
- Family: Gekkonidae
- Genus: Cnemaspis
- Species: C. fantastica

Binomial name
- Cnemaspis fantastica Agarwal, Thackeray, & Khandekar, 2022

Species of lizard

Cnemaspis fantastica, the fantastic dwarf gecko, is a species of diurnal, rock-dwelling, insectivorous gecko endemic to India.

The species name refers to its impressive colouration.
