= Cnemaspis gunawardanai =

Scientific classification
- Kingdom: Animalia
- Phylum: Chordata
- Class: Reptilia
- Order: Squamata
- Suborder: Gekkota
- Family: Gekkonidae
- Genus: Cnemaspis
- Species: C. gunawardanai

Binomial name
- Cnemaspis gunawardanai Amarasinghe, Karunarathna, Madawala & De Silva, 2021

Species of lizard

Cnemaspis gunawardanai, or Gunawardana's day gecko, is a species of diurnal rupicolous gecko endemic to island of Sri Lanka.

== Taxonomy ==
The species is closely resembling C. rajakarunai, C. hitihamii, and other congeners of the alwisi group.

== Etymology ==
The specific name gunawardanai is named in honor of Dr. Jagath Gunawardana. He is a leading environmental activist, conservationist, and a lawyer contributed to popularizing environmental laws among the general public.

== Description ==
An adult male is 37.4 mm long. Dorsum homogeneous with keeled granular scales. There are four spine-like tubercles on flanks. Dorsum patterned with creamy and yellowish vertebral markings on a uniform dark brown background. Snout is light brown. There is a black spot on the neck. A a vertebral cream stripe shading visible posteriorly. Arms and legs uniform dark brown with pale and dark blotches. Tail is dark brown with six pale yellow markings.

== Ecology ==
The gecko found only from two localities: Pilikuttuwa and Maligatenna, Gampaha district. Entirely wild species, it is commonly inhabited in dry, shaded, cool surfaces of rock outcrops inside caves. The researchers suggested critically endangered IUCN category for the species due to regional endemism.
