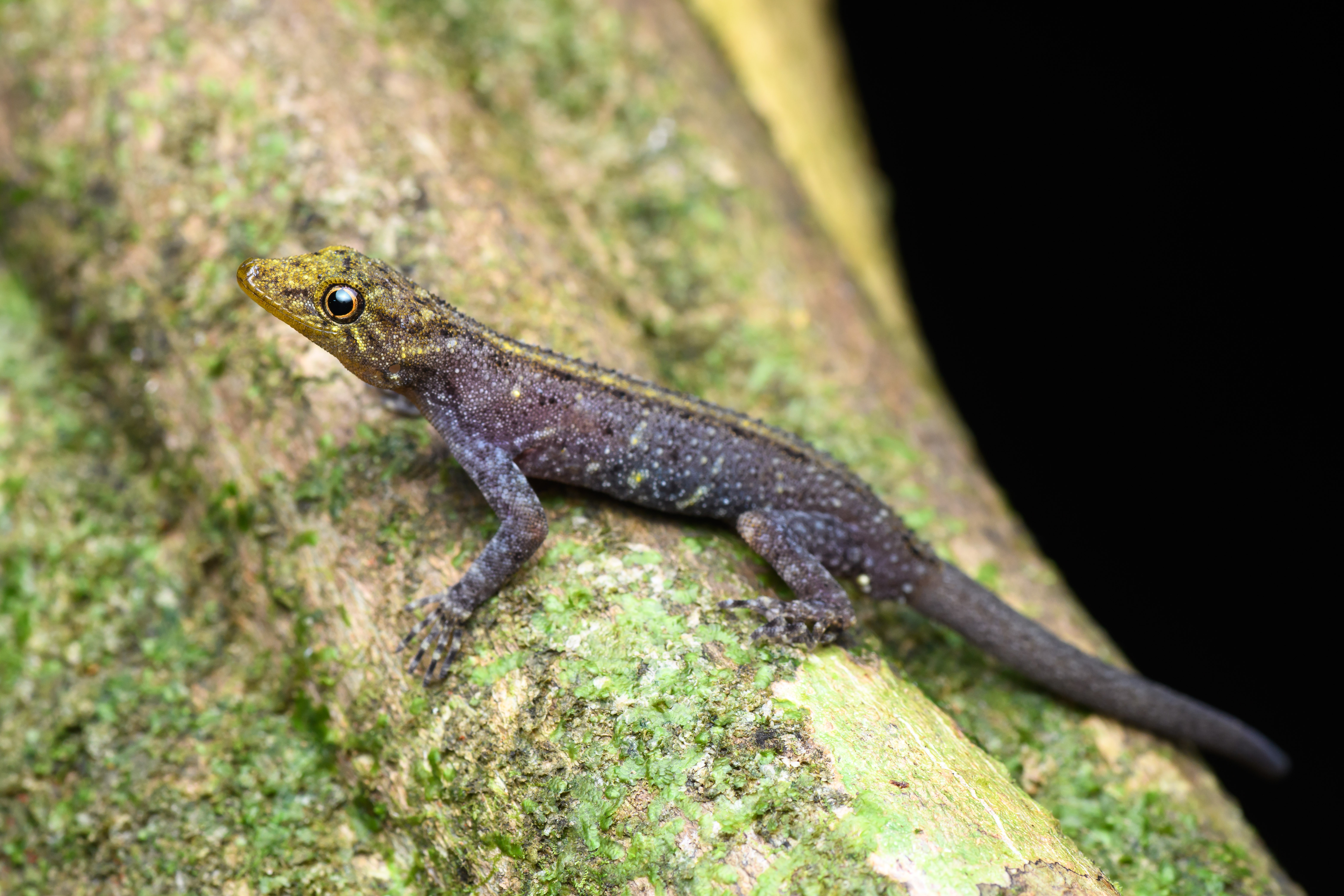

Conservation status
- Data Deficient (IUCN 3.1)

Scientific classification
- Kingdom: Animalia
- Phylum: Chordata
- Class: Reptilia
- Order: Squamata
- Suborder: Gekkota
- Family: Gekkonidae
- Genus: Cnemaspis
- Species: C. flavolineata

Binomial name
- Cnemaspis flavolineata (Nicholls, 1949)
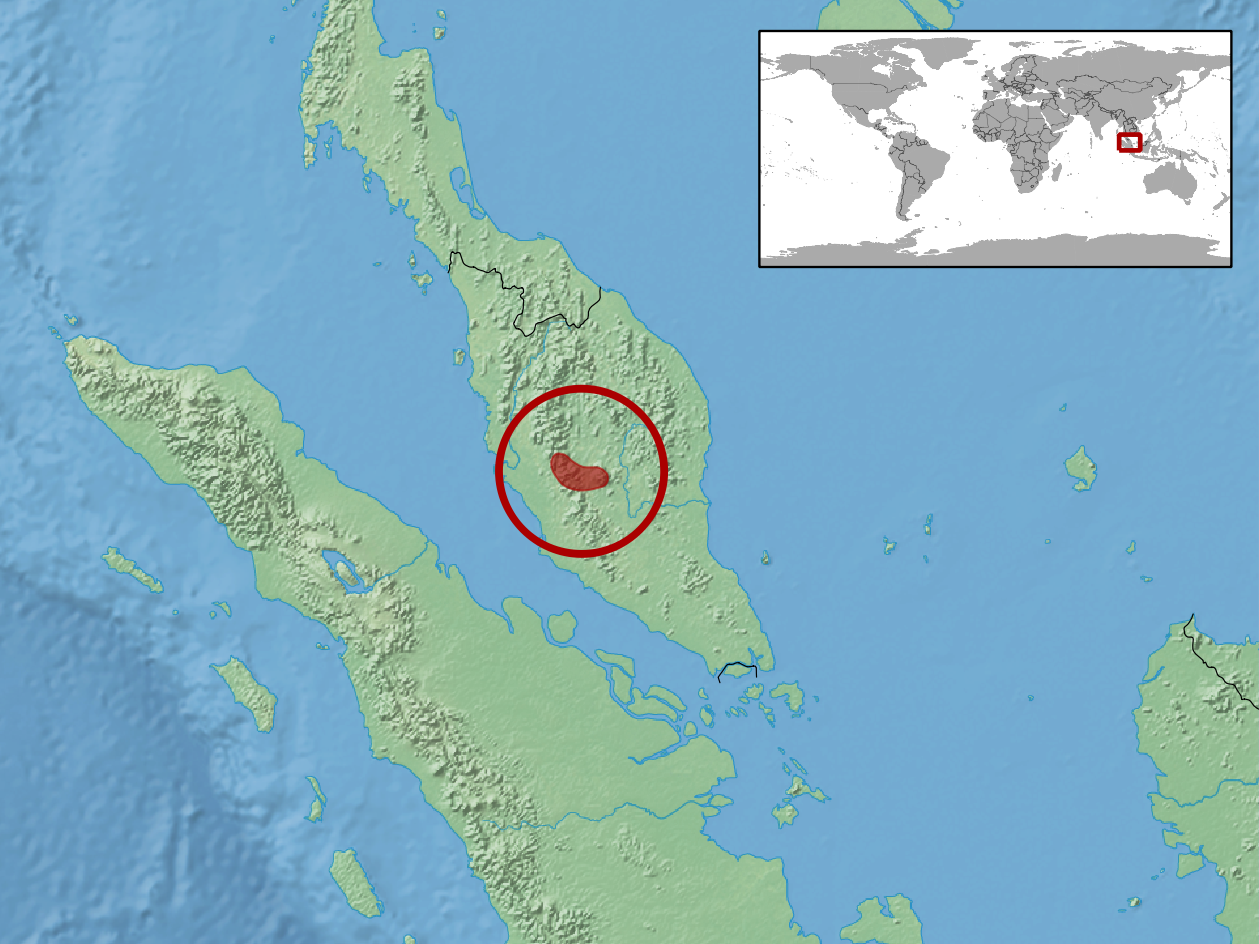

Synonyms
- Gonatodes flavolineatus

= Cnemaspis flavolineata =

Species of lizard

Cnemaspis flavolineata, also known as the yellow-striped rock gecko, Titiwangsa rock gecko, and Fraser's Hill rock gecko, is a species of gecko endemic to Malaysia.
