= Cnemaspis selamatkanmerapoh =

Scientific classification
- Kingdom: Animalia
- Phylum: Chordata
- Class: Reptilia
- Order: Squamata
- Suborder: Gekkota
- Family: Gekkonidae
- Genus: Cnemaspis
- Species: C. selamatkanmerapoh

Binomial name
- Cnemaspis selamatkanmerapoh Grismer, Wood, Mohamed, Chan, Heinz, Sumarli, Chan & Loredo, 2013

Species of lizard

Cnemaspis selamatkanmerapoh, also known as the Merapoh rock gecko, is a species of geckos endemic to Malaysia.
