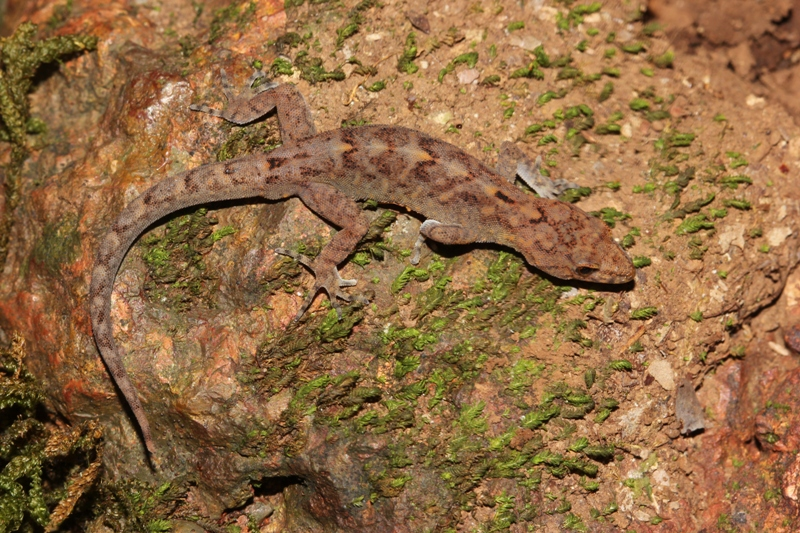

Scientific classification
- Kingdom: Animalia
- Phylum: Chordata
- Class: Reptilia
- Order: Squamata
- Suborder: Gekkota
- Family: Gekkonidae
- Genus: Cnemaspis
- Species: C. ajijae

Binomial name
- Cnemaspis ajijae Sayyed, Pyron, & DiLeepkumar, 2018

= Ajija's day gecko =

Species of lizard

Ajija's day gecko (Cnemaspis ajijae) is a species of gecko found in India.
