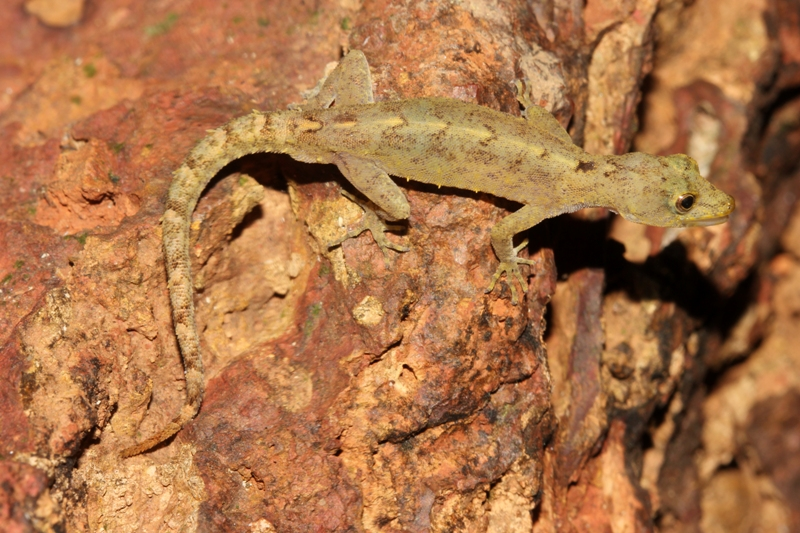

Scientific classification
- Kingdom: Animalia
- Phylum: Chordata
- Class: Reptilia
- Order: Squamata
- Suborder: Gekkota
- Family: Gekkonidae
- Genus: Cnemaspis
- Species: C. amboliensis

Binomial name
- Cnemaspis amboliensis Sayyed, Pyron, & DiLeepkumar, 2018

= Amboli day gecko =

Species of lizard

The Amboli day gecko (Cnemaspis amboliensis) is a species of gecko found in the India.
