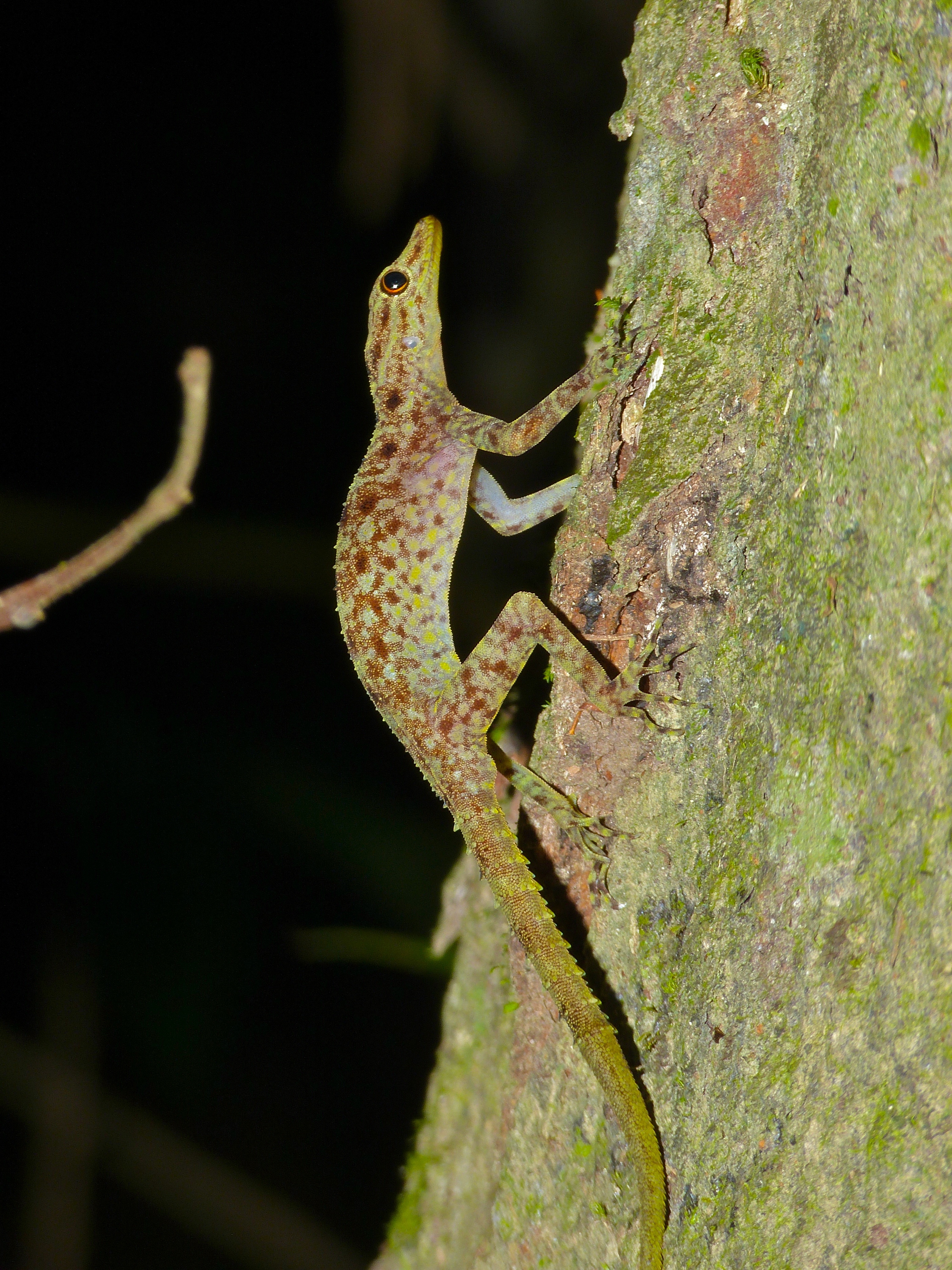

Scientific classification
- Kingdom: Animalia
- Phylum: Chordata
- Class: Reptilia
- Order: Squamata
- Suborder: Gekkota
- Family: Gekkonidae
- Genus: Cnemaspis
- Species: C. kendallii

Binomial name
- Cnemaspis kendallii (Gray, 1845)

Synonyms
- Heteronota kendallii Gray, 1845; Gonatodes kendallii — Boulenger, 1885; Cnemaspis kendallii — M.A. Smith, 1930

= Kendall's rock gecko =

Species of lizard

Kendall's rock gecko (Cnemaspis kendallii) is a species of gecko, a lizard in the family Gekkonidae. The species is endemic to Borneo and the Malaysian peninsula.

== Reproduction ==
C. kendallii is oviparous.
