= Cnemaspis caudanivea =

Scientific classification
- Domain: Eukaryota
- Kingdom: Animalia
- Phylum: Chordata
- Class: Reptilia
- Order: Squamata
- Infraorder: Gekkota
- Family: Gekkonidae
- Genus: Cnemaspis
- Species: C. caudanivea

Binomial name
- Cnemaspis caudanivea (Grismer & Ngo, 2007)

Species of lizard

Cnemaspis caudanivea, also known as the Hon Tre Island rock gecko, is a species of gecko endemic to southern Vietnam around Hon Tre Island, Kiên Giang Province and lives at a 100-meter elevation.

== Etymology ==
In Latin, cauda is translated into "tail", while niveus is an adjective meaning "of snow or snow like". Therefore, C. caudanivea's specific epithet describes its snow-colored tail.

== Description ==
C. caudanivea's tail is brilliant white in colour.
