= Cnemaspis aurantiacopes =

Scientific classification
- Kingdom: Animalia
- Phylum: Chordata
- Class: Reptilia
- Order: Squamata
- Suborder: Gekkota
- Family: Gekkonidae
- Genus: Cnemaspis
- Species: C. aurantiacopes

Binomial name
- Cnemaspis aurantiacopes Grismer & Ngo, 2007

Species of lizard

Cnemaspis aurantiacopes, also known as Hon Dat rock gecko, is a species of gecko endemic to southern Vietnam.
