= Cnemaspis hangus =

Scientific classification
- Kingdom: Animalia
- Phylum: Chordata
- Class: Reptilia
- Order: Squamata
- Suborder: Gekkota
- Family: Gekkonidae
- Genus: Cnemaspis
- Species: C. hangus

Binomial name
- Cnemaspis hangus Grismer et al., 2014

Species of lizard

Cnemaspis hangus is a species of gecko from Bukit Hangus, Pahang, Malaysia.
