= Cnemaspis rudhira =

Scientific classification
- Kingdom: Animalia
- Phylum: Chordata
- Class: Reptilia
- Order: Squamata
- Suborder: Gekkota
- Family: Gekkonidae
- Genus: Cnemaspis
- Species: C. rudhira

Binomial name
- Cnemaspis rudhira Agarwal, Thackeray, & Khandekar, 2022

Species of lizard

Cnemaspis rudhira, the scarlet dwarf gecko, is a species of diurnal, rock-dwelling, insectivorous gecko endemic to India.
