= Cnemaspis thayawthadangyi =

Scientific classification
- Kingdom: Animalia
- Phylum: Chordata
- Class: Reptilia
- Order: Squamata
- Suborder: Gekkota
- Family: Gekkonidae
- Genus: Cnemaspis
- Species: C. thayawthadangyi

Binomial name
- Cnemaspis thayawthadangyi Lee, Miller, Zug, & Mulcahy, 2019

Species of lizard

Cnemaspis thayawthadangyi, the Thayawthadangyi Islands rock gecko, is a species of diurnal, rock-dwelling, insectivorous gecko endemic to Myanmar. It is distributed in the Tanintharyi Region.
