= Cnemaspis mundanthuraiensis =

Scientific classification
- Kingdom: Animalia
- Phylum: Chordata
- Class: Reptilia
- Order: Squamata
- Suborder: Gekkota
- Family: Gekkonidae
- Genus: Cnemaspis
- Species: C. mundanthuraiensis

Binomial name
- Cnemaspis mundanthuraiensis Khandekar, Thackeray, & Agarwal, 2022

Species of lizard

Cnemaspis mundanthuraiensis is a species of diurnal, rock-dwelling, insectivorous gecko endemic to India.
