= Cnemaspis calderana =

Scientific classification
- Domain: Eukaryota
- Kingdom: Animalia
- Phylum: Chordata
- Class: Reptilia
- Order: Squamata
- Infraorder: Gekkota
- Family: Gekkonidae
- Genus: Cnemaspis
- Species: C. calderana

Binomial name
- Cnemaspis calderana Milto & Bezman-Moseyko, 2021

Species of lizard

Cnemaspis calderana is a species of gecko endemic to Sumatra in Indonesia.
