= Cnemaspis gunasekarai =

Scientific classification
- Kingdom: Animalia
- Phylum: Chordata
- Class: Reptilia
- Order: Squamata
- Suborder: Gekkota
- Family: Gekkonidae
- Genus: Cnemaspis
- Species: C. gunasekarai

Binomial name
- Cnemaspis gunasekarai Amarasinghe, Karunarathna, Madawala & De Silva, 2021

Species of lizard

Cnemaspis gunasekarai, or Gunasekara's day gecko, is a species of diurnal rupicolous gecko endemic to island of Sri Lanka.

== Taxonomy ==
The species is closely resembling C. nilgala, C. hitihamii, and other congeners of the alwisi group.

== Etymology ==
The specific name gunasekarai is named in honor of Samantha Gunasekara, who contributed to biodiversity conservation in Sri Lanka. He is a leading environmental activist, conservationist, and former deputy director of Sri Lanka Customs.

== Description ==
An adult male is 34.6 mm long. Dorsum homogeneous with keeled granular scales. There are four or five spine-like tubercles on flanks. Dorsum patterned with creamy vertebral markings on a uniform yellowish brown background. Snout is dark yellowish brown. There are two dark brown blotches behind the eye. A bright yellow and black stripe visible on the neck. Arms and legs uniform light brown with pale and dark blotches. Tail is yellowish brown with ten pale yellow markings.

== Ecology ==
The gecko is restricted to Ritigala wet forest patch. Entirely wild species, it is commonly inhabited in dry, shaded, cool surfaces of large rock outcrops or within caves. The researchers suggested critically endangered IUCN category for the species due to point endemism.
