= Cnemaspis timoriensis =

Scientific classification
- Domain: Eukaryota
- Kingdom: Animalia
- Phylum: Chordata
- Class: Reptilia
- Order: Squamata
- Infraorder: Gekkota
- Family: Gekkonidae
- Genus: Cnemaspis
- Species: C. timoriensis

Binomial name
- Cnemaspis timoriensis (Duméril & Bibron, 1836)

Synonyms
- Gymnodactylus timoriensis; Gonatodes timorensis

Species of lizard

Cnemaspis timoriensis is a species of gecko endemic to Timor.
