= Cnemaspis roticanai =

Conservation status
- Least Concern (IUCN 3.1)

Scientific classification
- Kingdom: Animalia
- Phylum: Chordata
- Class: Reptilia
- Order: Squamata
- Suborder: Gekkota
- Family: Gekkonidae
- Genus: Cnemaspis
- Species: C. roticanai

Binomial name
- Cnemaspis roticanai Grismer & Onn, 2010

Species of lizard

Cnemaspis roticanai, also known as the roti canai rock gecko, is a species of gecko endemic to the island of Langkawi, off the west coast of Peninsular Malaysia. It is named after roti canai, Malaysian flat bread.
