= Cnemaspis ingerorum =

Scientific classification
- Kingdom: Animalia
- Phylum: Chordata
- Class: Reptilia
- Order: Squamata
- Suborder: Gekkota
- Family: Gekkonidae
- Genus: Cnemaspis
- Species: C. ingerorum

Binomial name
- Cnemaspis ingerorum Batuwita, Agarwal, & Bauer, 2019

Species of lizard

Cnemaspis ingerorum is a species of diurnal gecko endemic to Sri Lanka.
