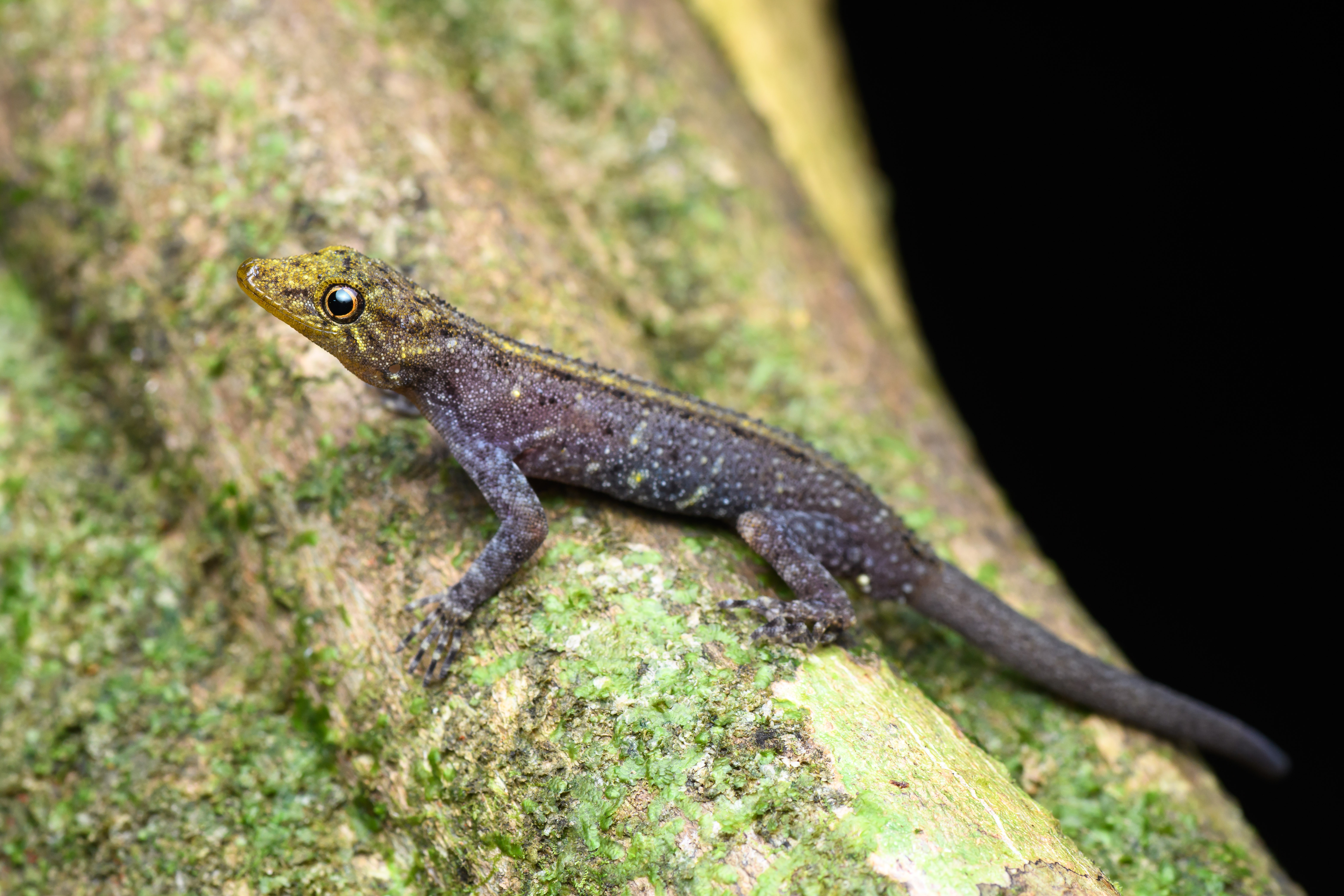
- Cnemaspis flavolineata

Scientific classification
- Kingdom: Animalia
- Phylum: Chordata
- Class: Reptilia
- Order: Squamata
- Suborder: Gekkota
- Family: Gekkonidae
- Subfamily: Gekkoninae
- Genus: Cnemaspis; Strauch, 1887

= Cnemaspis =

Genus of lizards

Cnemaspis is a genus of diurnal (day) geckos, lizards in the family Gekkonidae. The genus is native to Asia. With over 100 species, it is one of the most diverse genera of geckos. Molecular phylogenies suggest that the two regional groupings may form distinct clades which are not each other's closest relatives.

== Description ==
Species in the genus Cnemaspis have slender, clawed digits which are cylindrical or depressed at the base (rarely dilated); the distal phalanges are compressed, forming an angle with the basal portion of the digits, the lower surface of which has a row of plates. Their bodies are more or less depressed, granular or tubercular above. The tail is not compressed. The pupil is circular, and the eyelid is distinct all round the eye. Males may or may not have pre-anal or femoral pores.

== Species ==
=== The Indian Subcontinent and Sri Lanka group ===
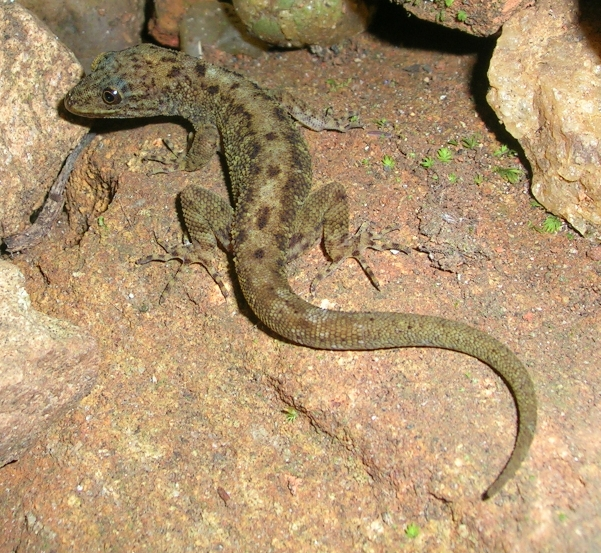
A Wynad day gecko (C. wynad) from India

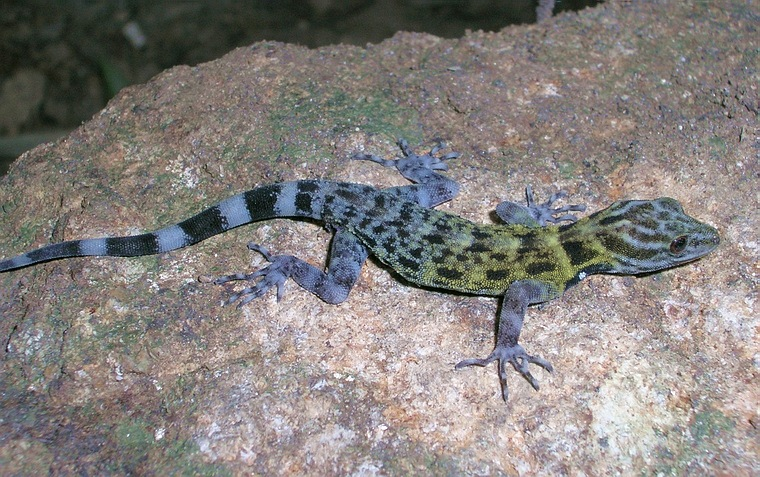
An ornate day gecko (C. ornata) from the Shendurney Wildlife Sanctuary, Kerala

- C. aaronbaueri Sayyed, Grismer, Campbell & Dileepkumar, 2019
- C. adii C. Srinivasulu, Kumar & B. Srinivasulu, 2015 – Adi's day gecko
- C. agarwali Khandekar, 2019 – Agarwal's dwarf gecko
- C. agayagangai Agarwal, Thackeray, & Khandekar, 2022 – Agaya Gangai dwarf gecko
- C. ajijae Sayyed, Pyron & Dileepkumar, 2018 – Ajija's day gecko
- C. alwisi Wickramasinghe & Munindradasa, 2007 – Alwis's day gecko
- C. amba Khandekar, Thackeray & Agarwal, 2019 – Amba dwarf gecko
- C. amboliensis Sayyed, Pyron & Dileepkumar, 2018 – Amboli day gecko
- C. amith Manamendra-Arachchi, Batuwita & Pethiyagoda, 2007 – Amith's day gecko
- C. anamudiensis Cyriac, Johny, Umesh & Palot, 2018
- C. anandani Murthy, Nitesh, Sengupta & Deepak, 2019 – Anandan's day gecko
- C. andersonii (Annandale, 1905)
- C. anslemi Karunarathna & Ukuwela, 2019
- C. assamensis Das & Sengupta, 2000 – Assam day gecko
- C. australis Manamendra-Arachchi, Batuwita & Pethiyagoda, 2007 – southern day gecko
- C. avasabinae Agarwal, Bauer & Khandekar, 2020 – Sabin's Nellore dwarf gecko
- C. azhagu Khandekar, Thackeray, & Agarwal, 2022
- C. balerion Pal, Mirza, Dsouza & Shanker, 2021
- C. bangara Agarwal, Thackeray, Pal, & Khandekar, 2020
- C. beddomei (Theobald, 1876) – Beddome's day gecko
- C. boiei (Gray, 1876) – Boie's day gecko
- C. butewai Karunarathna et al., 2019 – Butewe's day gecko
- C. cavernicola Khandekar, Thackeray, Kalaimani & Agarwal, 2023
- C. chengodumalaensis Cyriac, Palot, Deuti & Umesh, 2020
- C. dissanayakai Karunarathna et al., 2019 – Dissanayaka's day gecko
- C. fantastica Agarwal, Thackeray, & Khandekar, 2022 – fantastic dwarf gecko
- C. flavigularis Pal, Mirza, Dsouza, & Shanker, 2021
- C. flaviventralis Sayyed, Pyron & Dahanukar, 2016 – yellow-bellied day gecko
- C. galaxia Pal, Mirza, Dsouza & Shanker, 2021
- C. ganeshaiahi Narayanan, Pal, Grismer, &Aravind, 2023 – Ganeshaiah's dwarf gecko
- C. gemunu de Silva, Greenbaum & Jackman, 2007
- C. girii Mirza, Pal, Bhosale & Sanap, 2014 – Giri's day gecko
- C. goaensis Sharma, 1976 – Goan day gecko
- C. godagedarai de Silva, Bauer, Botejue & Karunarathna, 2019 – Godagedara's day gecko
- C. gotaimbarai Karunarathna et al., 2019 – Gotaimbara's day gecko
- C. gracilis (Beddome, 1870) – graceful day gecko
- C. graniticola Agarwal, Thackeray, Pal & Khandekar, 2020 – granite dwarf gecko
- C. gunasekarai Amarasinghe, Karunarathna, Madawala & de Silva, 2021
- C. gunawardanai Amarasinghe, Karunarathna, Madawala & de Silva, 2021
- C. heteropholis Bauer, 2002 – Gund day gecko, different-scaled day gecko
- C. hitihamii Karunarathna et al., 2019 – Hitihami's day gecko
- C. indica Gray, 1846 – Indian day gecko, Nilgiri dwarf gecko
- C. ingerorum Batuwita, Agarwal & Bauer, 2019
- C. jackieii Pal, Mirza, Dsouza & Shanker, 2021
- C. jayaweerai Karunarathna, Ukuwela, De Silva, Bauer, Madawala, Poyarkov, Botejue, Gabadage, Grismer, & Gorin, 2023
- C. jerdonii (Theobald, 1868) – Jerdon's day gecko
- C. kalakadensis Khandekar, Thackeray, & Agarwal, 2022
- C. kallima Manamendra-Arachchi, Batuwita & Pethiyagoda, 2007
- C. kandambyi Batuwita & Udugampala, 2017
- C. kandiana (Kelaart, 1852), Kandyan day gecko
- C. kawminiae Karunarathna et al., 2019 – Kawmini's day gecko
- C. kivulegedarai Karunarathna et al., 2019 – Kivulegedara's day gecko
- C. kohukumburai Karunarathna et al., 2019 – Kohukumbura's day gecko
- C. kolhapurensis Giri, Bauer & Gaikwad, 2009 – Kolhapur day gecko
- C. kotagamai Karunarathna et al., 2019) – Kotagama's day gecko
- C. kottiyoorensis Cyriac & Umesh, 2014 – Kottiyoor day gecko
- C. koynaensis Khandekar, Thackeray & Agarwal, 2019 – Koyna dwarf gecko
- C. krishnagiriensis Agarwal, Thackeray & Khandekar, 2021 – Krishnagiri dwarf gecko
- C. kumarasinghei Wickramasinghe & Munindradasa, 2007 – Kumarasinghe's day gecko
- C. latha Manamendra-Arachchi, Batuwita & Pethiyagoda, 2007 – Latha's day gecko
- C. limayei Sayyed, Pyron & Dileepkumar, 2018 – Limaye's day gecko
- C. lithophilis Pal, Mirza, Dsouza & Shanker, 2021
- C. littoralis (Jerdon, 1854) – coastal day gecko
- C. lokugei Karunarathna et al., 2021 – Lokuge's day gecko
- C. maculicollis Cyriac, Johny, Umesh & Palot, 2018
- C. magnifica Khandekar, Thackeray, Pal & Agarwal, 2020 – Magnificent dwarf gecko
- C. mahabali Sayyed, Pyron & Dileepkumar, 2018 – Mahabal's day gecko
- C. manoae Amarasinghe & Karunarathna, 2020 – Mano's day gecko
- C. menikay Manamendra-Arachchi, Batuwita & Pethiyagoda, 2007
- C. molligodai Wickramasinghe & Munindradasa, 2007 – Molligoda's day gecko
- C. monticola Manamendra-Arachchi, Batuwita & Pethiyagoda, 2007
- C. mundanthuraiensis Khandekar, Thackeray, & Agarwal, 2022
- C. mysoriensis (Jerdon, 1853) – Mysore day gecko
- C. nairi Inger, Marx & Koshy, 1984 – Ponmudi day gecko
- C. nandimithrai Karunarathna et al., 2019 – Nandimithra's day gecko
- C. nanayakkarai Karunarathna, Ukuwela, De Silva, Bauer, Madawala, Poyarkov, Botejue, Gabadage, Grismer, & Gorin, 2023
- C. nicobaricus Chandramouli, 2020
- C. nigriventris Pal, Mirza, Dsouza & Shanker, 2021
- C. nilagirica Manamendra-Arachchi, Batuwita & Pethiyagoda, 2007 – Nilgiri day gecko
- C. nilgala Karunarathna, Bauer, de Silva, Surasinghe, Somaratna, Madawala, Gabadage, Botejue, Henkanaththegedara & Ukuwela, 2019 – Nilgala day gecko
- C. nimbus Pal, Mirza, Dsouza & Shanker, 2021
- C. ornata (Beddome, 1870) – ornate day gecko
- C. pachaimalaiensis Agarwal, Thackeray, & Khandekar, 2022 – Pachaimalai dwarf gecko
- C. palakkadensis Sayyed, Cyriac & Dileepkumar, 2020 – Palakkad dwarf gecko
- C. palanica Pal, Mirza, Dsouza & Shanker, 2021
- C. pava Manamendra-Arachchi, Batuwita & Pethiyagoda, 2007
- C. phillipsi Manamendra-Arachchi, Batuwita & Pethiyagoda, 2007 – Phillip's day gecko
- C. podihuna Deraniyagala, 1944 – Deraniyagala's gecko
- C. pulchra Manamendra-Arachchi, Batuwita & Pethiyagoda, 2007
- C. punctata Manamendra-Arachchi, Batuwita & Pethiyagoda, 2007
- C. rajakarunai Wickramasinghe, Vidanapathirana & Rathnayake, 2016
- C. rajgadensis Sayyed, Cyriac, Pardeshi & Sulakhe, 2021
- C. ranganaensis Sayyed & Sulakhe, 2020 – Rangana dwarf gecko
- C. regalis Pal, Mirza, Dsouza & Shanker, 2021
- C. rashidi Sayyed et al, 2023
- C. retigalensis Wickramasinghe & Munindradasa, 2007 – Retigala day gecko
- C. rishivalleyensis Agarwal, Thackeray & Khandekar, 2020 – Rishi Valley dwarf gecko
- C. rubraoculus Pal, Mirza, Dsouza & Shanker, 2021
- C. rudhira Agarwal, Thackeray, & Khandekar, 2022 – scarlet dwarf gecko
- C. sakleshpurensis Khandekar, Thackeray, & Agarwal, 2022
- C. salimalii Agarwal, Thackeray, & Khandekar, 2022 – Salim Ali's dwarf gecko
- C. samanalensis Wickramasinghe & Munindradasa, 2007 – Samanala day gecko
- Cnemaspis sathuragiriensis Khandekar, Thackeray & Agarwal, 2024
- C. scalpensis (Ferguson, 1877) – Ferguson's day gecko
- C. schalleri Agarwal, Thackeray & Khandekar, 2021 – Schaller's Sakleshpur dwarf gecko
- C. shevaroyensis Khandekar, Gaitonde & Agarwal, 2019 – Shevaroy dwarf gecko
- C. silvula Manamendra-Arachchi, Batuwita & Pethiyagoda, 2007 – forest day gecko
- C. sisparensis (Theobald, 1876) – Sispara day gecko or Theobald's gecko
- C. smaug Pal, Mirza, Dsouza & Shanker, 2021
- C. stellapulvis Khandekar, Thackeray & Agarwal, 2020 – stardust dwarf gecko
- Cnemaspis sundara Sayyed et al., 2023
- C. tanintharyi Lee, Miller, Zug, & Mulcahy, 2019 – Tanintharyi rock gecko
- C. thackerayi Khandekar, Gaitonde, & Agarwal, 2019 – Thackeray's dwarf gecko
- C. thayawthadangyi Lee, Miller, Zug & Mulcahy, 2019 – Thayawthadangyi Islands rock gecko
- C. tigris Khandekar, Thackeray, & Agarwal, 2022
- Cnemaspis triedra Sayyed et al., 2023
- C. tropidogaster (Boulenger, 1885) – rough-bellied day gecko or marked-belly gecko
- C. umashaankeri Narayanan & Aravind, 2022
- C. upendrai Manamendra-Arachchi, Batuwita & Pethiyagoda, 2007 – Upendra's day gecko
- C. uttaraghati Agarwal, Thackeray & Khandekar, 2021
- C. vijayae Khandekar, Thackeray, & Agarwal, 2022
- C. wallaceii Pal, Mirza, Dsouza & Shanker, 2021
- Cnemaspis vangoghi Khandekar, Thackeray & Agarwal, 2024
- C. wicksi (Stoliczka, 1873)
- C. wynadensis (Beddome, 1870) – Wynad day gecko
- C. yelagiriensis Agarwal, Thackeray, Pal & Khandekar, 2020 – Yelagiri dwarf gecko
- C. yercaudensis Das & Bauer, 2000 – Yercaud day gecko
- C. zacharyi Cyriac, Palot, Deuti & Umesh, 2020

=== The Sundaland group ===
- C. aceh Iskandar, McGuire, & Amarasinghe, 2017
- C. adangrawi Ampai, Rujirawan, Wood, Stuart, & Aowphol, 2019 - Adang-Rawi rock gecko
- C. affinis (Stoliczka, 1870) – Stoliczka's gecko, Pinang Island rock gecko
- C. andalas Iskandar, McGuire, & Amarasinghe, 2017
- C. argus Dring, 1979 – Dring's gecko, Argus rock gecko, Lawit Mountain rock gecko
- C. aurantiacopes Grismer & Ngo, 2007 – Hon Dat rock gecko
- C. auriventralis Rujirawan, Yodthong, Ampai, Termprayoon, Aksornneam, Stuart, & Aowphol, 2022 – Erawan rock gecko
- C. baueri Das & Grismer 2003 – Bauer's rock gecko, Pulau Aur rock gecko
- C. bayuensis Grismer, Grismer, Wood, & Chan 2008 – Kampung Bayu rock gecko, Gua Bayu rock gecko, Bayu Cave rock gecko
- C. bidongensis Grismer, Wood, Ahmad, Sumarli, Vazquez, Ismail, Nance, Mohd-amin, Othman, Rizaijessika, Kuss, Murdoc, & Cobos, 2014 – Pulau Bidong rock gecko
- C. biocellata Grismer, Chan, Nurolhuda, & Sumontha 2008, – twin-spot rock gecko
- C. boulengeri Strauch 1887 – Boulenger's rock gecko, Con Dao round eyed gecko
- C. calderana Milto & Bezman-Moseyko, 2021
- C. chanardi Grismer, Sumontha, Cota, Grismer, Wood, Pauwels, & Kunya, 2010 - Chan-ard's rock gecko
- C. chanthaburiensis Bauer & Das 1998 – Chanthaburi rock gecko
- C. caudanivea Grismer & Ngo, 2007 – Hon Tre Island rock gecko
- C. dezwaani Das 2005
- C. dringi Das & Bauer 1998 – Dring's rock gecko
- C. flavigaster Chan & Grismer 2008 – orange-bellied rock gecko
- C. flavolineata (Nicholls, 1949) – yellow-striped rock gecko
- C. grismeri Wood, Quah, Anuar Ms, & Muin, 2013 - Grismer's rock gecko
- C. hangus Grismer et al., 2014
- C. harimau Chan, Grismer, Anuar, Quah, Muin, Savage, Grismer, Ahmad, Remigio, & Greer, 2010 - tiger rock gecko
- C. huaseesom Grismer, Sumontha, Cota, Grismer, Wood, Pauwels, & Kunya, 2010
- C. jacobsoni Das 2005
- C. kamolnorranathi Grismer, Sumontha, Cota, Grismer, Wood, Pauwels, & Kunya, 2010 – Kamolnorranath's rock gecko
- C. karsticola Grismer, Grismer, Wood, & Chan 2008 – karst-dwelling rock gecko
- C. kendallii (Gray, 1845) – Kendall's rock gecko
- C. kumpoli Taylor 1963 – Kumpol's rock gecko, Trang Province gecko
- C. lagang Nashriq, Davis, Bauer, & Das, 2022
- C. laoensis Grismer, 2010 - Lao rock gecko
- C. leucura Kurita, Nishikawa, Matsui, & Hikida, 2017 - curse rock gecko
- C. limi Das & Grismer 2003 – Tioman Island rock gecko
- C. lineatubercularis Ampai, Wood, Stuart, & Aowphol, 2020 - Lan Saka rock gecko
- C. lineogularis Wood, Grismer, Aowphol, Aguilar, Cota, Grismer, Murdoch, & Sites, 2017 - stripe-throated rock gecko
- C. mahsuriae Grismer, Wood, Quah, Anuar, Ngadi, & Ahmad, 2015 - Mahsuri's rock gecko
- C. matahari Nashriq, Davis, Bauer, & Das, 2022
- C. mcguirei Grismer, Grismer, Wood, & Chan 2008 – McGuire's rock gecko
- C. minang Iskandar, McGuire, & Amarsinghe, 2017
- C. modiglianii Das 2005
- C. monachorum Grismer, Ahmad, Chan, Belabut, Muin, Wood, & Grismer, 2009 - Monks's rock gecko
- C. mumpuniae Grismer et al., 2014
- C. muria Riyanto, Munir, Martamenggala, Fitriana, & Hamidy, 2019
- C. narathiwatensis Grismer, Sumontha, Cota, Grismer, Wood, Pauwels, & Kunya, 2010 – Narathiwat rock gecko
- C. neangthyi Grismer, Grismer, & Chav, 2010 – Neang Thy's rock gecko
- C. nigridia (Smith, 1925) – Borneo black gecko, black-spotted rock gecko
- C. niyomwanae Grismer, Sumontha, Cota, Grismer, Wood, Pauwels, & Kunya, 2010 – Niyomwan's rock gecko,
- C. nuicamensis Grismer & Ngo, 2007 – Nui Cam Hill rock gecko
- C. omari Grismer et al., 2014
- C. pagai Iskandar, McGuire, & Amarsinghe, 2017
- C. paripari Grismer & Onn, 2009 - fairy rock gecko
- C. pemanggilensis Grismer & Das 2006 – Johor, West Malaysia – Pemanggil Island rock gecko
- C. peninsularis Grismer et al., 2014 – peninsular rock gecko
- C. perhentianensis Grismer & Chan, 2008
- C. phangngaensis Wood, Grismer, Aowphol, Aguilar, Cota, Grismer, Murdoch, & Sites, 2017 - Phang Nga rock gecko
- C. phuketensis Das & Leon 2004,
- C. pseudomcguirei Grismer, Ahmad, Chan, Belabut, Muin, Wood, & Grismer, 2009 - false McGuire's rock gecko
- C. psychedelica Grismer, Ngo, & Grismer, 2010 – psychedelic rock gecko
- C. punctatonuchalis Grismer, Sumontha, Cota, Grismer, Wood, Pauwels, & Kunya, 2010 – spotted-neck rock gecko
- C. purnamai Riyanto, Hamidy, Sidik, & Gunalen, 2017
- C. rajabasa Amarasinghe, Harvey, Riyanto, & Smith, 2015
- C. roticanai Grismer & Onn, 2010 – Roti Canai rock gecko
- C. samui Ampai, Rujirawan, Yodthong, Termprayoon, Stuart, Wood, & Aowphol, 2022
- C. selamatkanmerapoh Grismer, Wood, Mohamed, Chan, Heinz, Sumarli, Chan & Loredo, 2013 - Merapoh rock gecko
- C. selenolagus Grismer, Yushchenko, Pawangkhanant, Nazarov, Naiduangchan, Suwannapoom & Poyarkov, 2020 - Moon Rabbit Rock Gecko
- C. shahruli Grismer, Chan, Quah, Muin, Savage, Grismer, Ahmad, Greer, & Remegio, 2010 - Shahrul's rock gecko
- C. siamensis (Smith, 1925) – Siamese rock gecko
- C. similan Ampai, Rujirawan, Yodthong, Termprayoon, Stuart, Wood, & Aowphol, 2022
- C. sirehensis Nashriq, Davis, Bauer, & Das, 2022
- C. stongensis Grismer et al., 2014
- C. sundagekko Grismer et al., 2014
- C. sundainsula Grismer et al., 2014
- C. tapanuli Iskandar, McGuire, & Amarsinghe, 2017
- C. tarutaoensis Ampai, Rujirawan, Wood, Stuart, & Aowphol, 2019 - Tarutao rock gecko
- C. temiah Grismer et al., 2014
- C. thachanaensis Wood, Grismer, Aowphol, Aguilar, Cota, Grismer, Murdoch, & Sites, 2017
- C. tubaensis Quah, Wood, Anuar, & Muin, 2020 – Tuba Island rock gecko
- C. tucdupensis Grismer & Ngo, 2007 – Tuc Dup Hill rock gecko
- C. timoriensis Duméril & Bibron 1836,
- C. vandeventeri Grismer, Sumontha, Cota, Grismer, Wood, Pauwels, & Kunya, 2010 – VanDeventer's rock gecko
- C. whittenorum Das 2005
