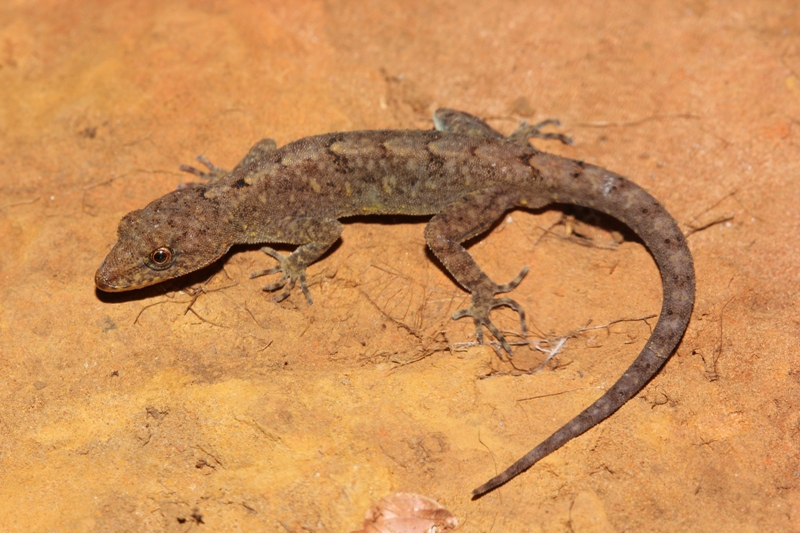

Scientific classification
- Kingdom: Animalia
- Phylum: Chordata
- Class: Reptilia
- Order: Squamata
- Suborder: Gekkota
- Family: Gekkonidae
- Genus: Cnemaspis
- Species: C. limayei

Binomial name
- Cnemaspis limayei Sayyed, Pyron, & DiLeepkumar, 2018

= Limaye's day gecko =

Species of lizard

Limaye's day gecko (Cnemaspis limayei) is a species of gecko found in India.
