= Cnemaspis molligodai =

Conservation status
- Endangered (IUCN 3.1)

Scientific classification
- Kingdom: Animalia
- Phylum: Chordata
- Class: Reptilia
- Order: Squamata
- Suborder: Gekkota
- Family: Gekkonidae
- Genus: Cnemaspis
- Species: C. molligodai

Binomial name
- Cnemaspis molligodai Wickramasinghe & Munindradasa, 2007

Species of lizard

Cnemaspis molligodai, commonly known as Molligoda's day gecko, is a species of diurnal lizard in the family Gekkonidae. The species is endemic to the island of Sri Lanka.

== Etymology ==
The specific name, molligodai, is in honor of Sri Lankan Hayasinth Molligoda for his service and commitment to the conservation of the amphibians and reptiles of Sri Lanka.

== Description ==
Adult males of Cnemaspis molligodai measure 25–28 mm (0.98–1.10 in) in snout-to-vent length (SVL).

== Geographic distribution ==
Cnemaspis molligodai is found in southwestern Sri Lanka, in the island's wet zone.

== Habitat ==
The preferred natural habitat of Cnemaspis molligodai is forest, at elevations from sea level to 200 m (660 ft).

== Behavior ==
Cnemaspis molligodai is arboreal and can be found high in the forest canopy.

== Reproduction ==
Cnemaspis molligodai is oviparous.
