= Cnemaspis ganeshaiahi =

Scientific classification
- Kingdom: Animalia
- Phylum: Chordata
- Class: Reptilia
- Order: Squamata
- Suborder: Gekkota
- Family: Gekkonidae
- Genus: Cnemaspis
- Species: C. ganeshaiahi

Binomial name
- Cnemaspis ganeshaiahi Narayanan, Pal, Grismer, & Aravind, 2023

Species of lizard

Cnemaspis ganeshaiahi, Ganeshaiah's dwarf gecko, is a species of diurnal, rock-dwelling, insectivorous gecko endemic to India.
