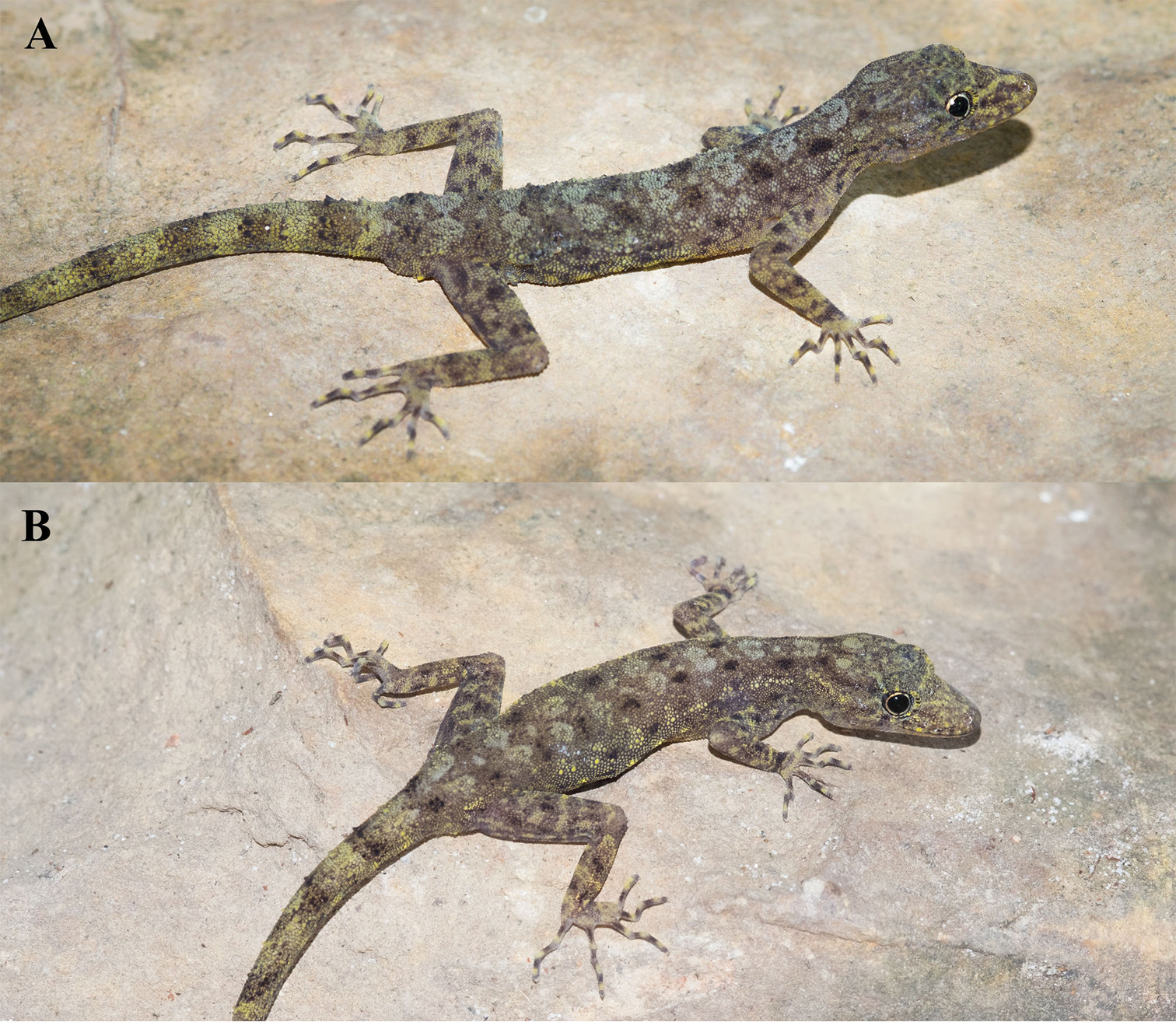

Scientific classification
- Kingdom: Animalia
- Phylum: Chordata
- Class: Reptilia
- Order: Squamata
- Suborder: Gekkota
- Family: Gekkonidae
- Genus: Cnemaspis
- Species: C. tarutaoensis

Binomial name
- Cnemaspis tarutaoensis Ampai, Rujirawan, Wood, Stuart, & Aowphol, 2019

= Cnemaspis tarutaoensis =

Species of lizard

Cnemaspis tarutaoensis, the Tarutao rock gecko, is a species of gecko endemic to Thailand.
