= Cnemaspis krishnagiriensis =

Scientific classification
- Kingdom: Animalia
- Phylum: Chordata
- Class: Reptilia
- Order: Squamata
- Suborder: Gekkota
- Family: Gekkonidae
- Genus: Cnemaspis
- Species: C. krishnagiriensis

Binomial name
- Cnemaspis krishnagiriensis Agarwal, Thackeray, & Khandekar, 2021

Species of lizard

Cnemaspis krishnagiriensis, the Krishnagiri dwarf gecko, is a species of diurnal, rock-dwelling, insectivorous gecko endemic to India. It is distributed in Tamil Nadu.
