= Cnemaspis samui =

Scientific classification
- Kingdom: Animalia
- Phylum: Chordata
- Class: Reptilia
- Order: Squamata
- Suborder: Gekkota
- Family: Gekkonidae
- Genus: Cnemaspis
- Species: C. samui

Binomial name
- Cnemaspis samui Ampai, Rujirawan, Yodthong, Termprayoon, Stuart, Wood, & Aowphol, 2022

Species of lizard

Cnemaspis samui is a species of diurnal, rock-dwelling, insectivorous gecko endemic to Thailand.

The species name refers to the type locality of the species, Ko Samui.
