= Cnemaspis phuketensis =

Scientific classification
- Domain: Eukaryota
- Kingdom: Animalia
- Phylum: Chordata
- Class: Reptilia
- Order: Squamata
- Infraorder: Gekkota
- Family: Gekkonidae
- Genus: Cnemaspis
- Species: C. phuketensis

Binomial name
- Cnemaspis phuketensis Das & Leong, 2004

Species of lizard

Cnemaspis phuketensis is a species of gecko endemic to southern Thailand.
