= Cnemaspis magnifica =

Scientific classification
- Kingdom: Animalia
- Phylum: Chordata
- Class: Reptilia
- Order: Squamata
- Suborder: Gekkota
- Family: Gekkonidae
- Genus: Cnemaspis
- Species: C. magnifica

Binomial name
- Cnemaspis magnifica Khandekar, Thackeray, Pal, & Agarwal, 2020

Species of lizard

Cnemaspis magnifica is a species of diurnal, rock-dwelling, insectivorous gecko endemic to the Western Ghats of South India. It is distributed in Sakleshpur hills in southwestern Karnataka.
