= Cnemaspis karsticola =

Scientific classification
- Kingdom: Animalia
- Phylum: Chordata
- Class: Reptilia
- Order: Squamata
- Suborder: Gekkota
- Family: Gekkonidae
- Genus: Cnemaspis
- Species: C. karsticola

Binomial name
- Cnemaspis karsticola Grismer, Grismer, Wood & Chan, 2008

Species of lizard

Cnemaspis karsticola, also known as karst-dwelling rock gecko, is a species of gecko endemic to Malaysia.
