= Cnemaspis laoensis =

Scientific classification
- Kingdom: Animalia
- Phylum: Chordata
- Class: Reptilia
- Order: Squamata
- Suborder: Gekkota
- Family: Gekkonidae
- Genus: Cnemaspis
- Species: C. laoensis

Binomial name
- Cnemaspis laoensis Grismer, 2010

Species of lizard

Cnemaspis laoensis, also known as the Lao rock gecko, is a species of gecko endemic to Laos.
