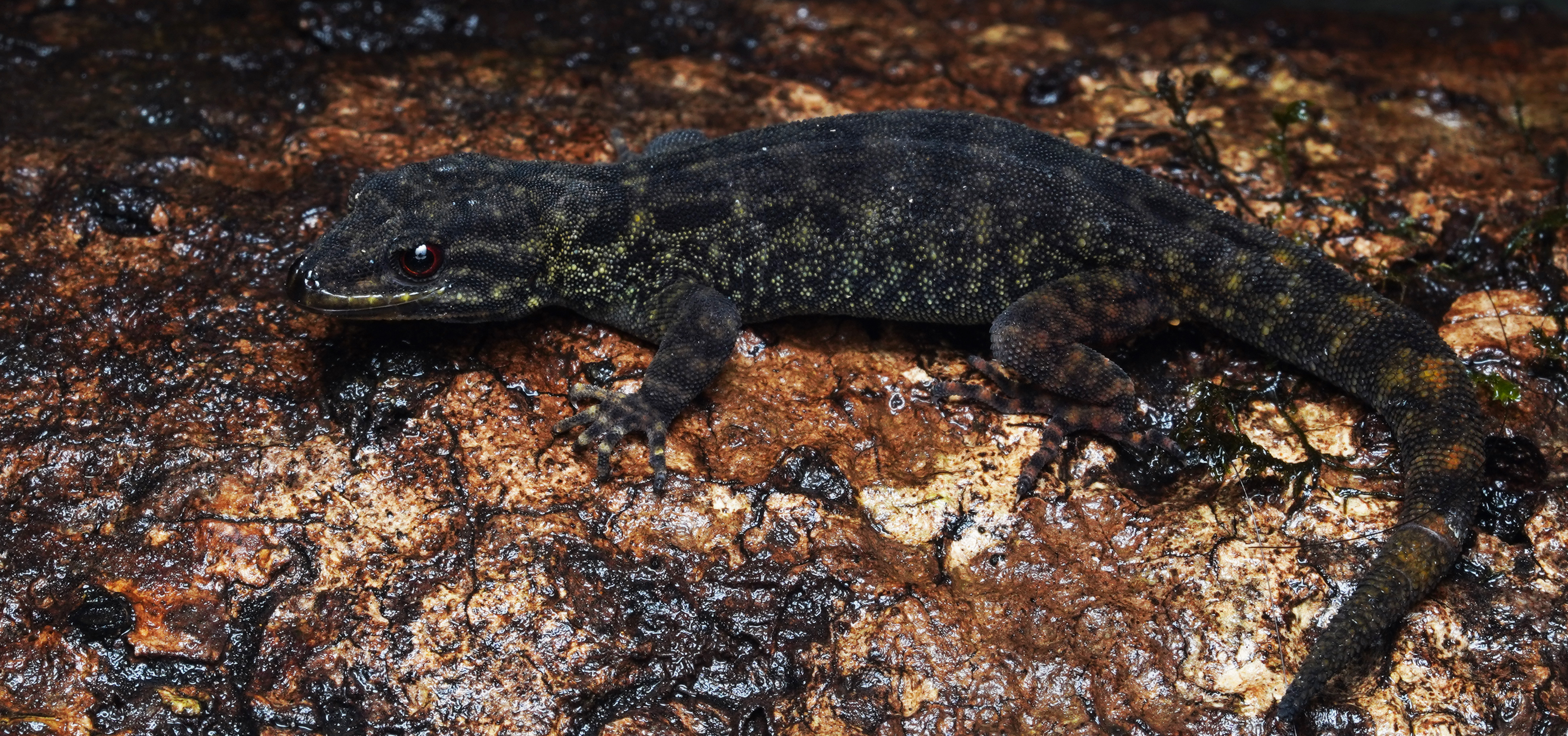

Scientific classification
- Kingdom: Animalia
- Phylum: Chordata
- Class: Reptilia
- Order: Squamata
- Suborder: Gekkota
- Family: Gekkonidae
- Genus: Cnemaspis
- Species: C. rubraoculus

Binomial name
- Cnemaspis rubraoculus Pal, Mirza, Dsouza, & Shanker, 2021

= Cnemaspis rubraoculus =

Species of lizard

Cnemaspis rubraoculus is a species of diurnal, rock-dwelling, insectivorous gecko endemic to India.
