= Cnemaspis schalleri =

Scientific classification
- Kingdom: Animalia
- Phylum: Chordata
- Class: Reptilia
- Order: Squamata
- Suborder: Gekkota
- Family: Gekkonidae
- Genus: Cnemaspis
- Species: C. schalleri

Binomial name
- Cnemaspis schalleri Agarwal, Thackeray, & Khandekar, 2021

Species of lizard

Cnemaspis schalleri, also known as Schaller's Sakleshpur dwarf gecko, is a species of diurnal, rock-dwelling, insectivorous gecko endemic to India. It is distributed in Karnataka.
