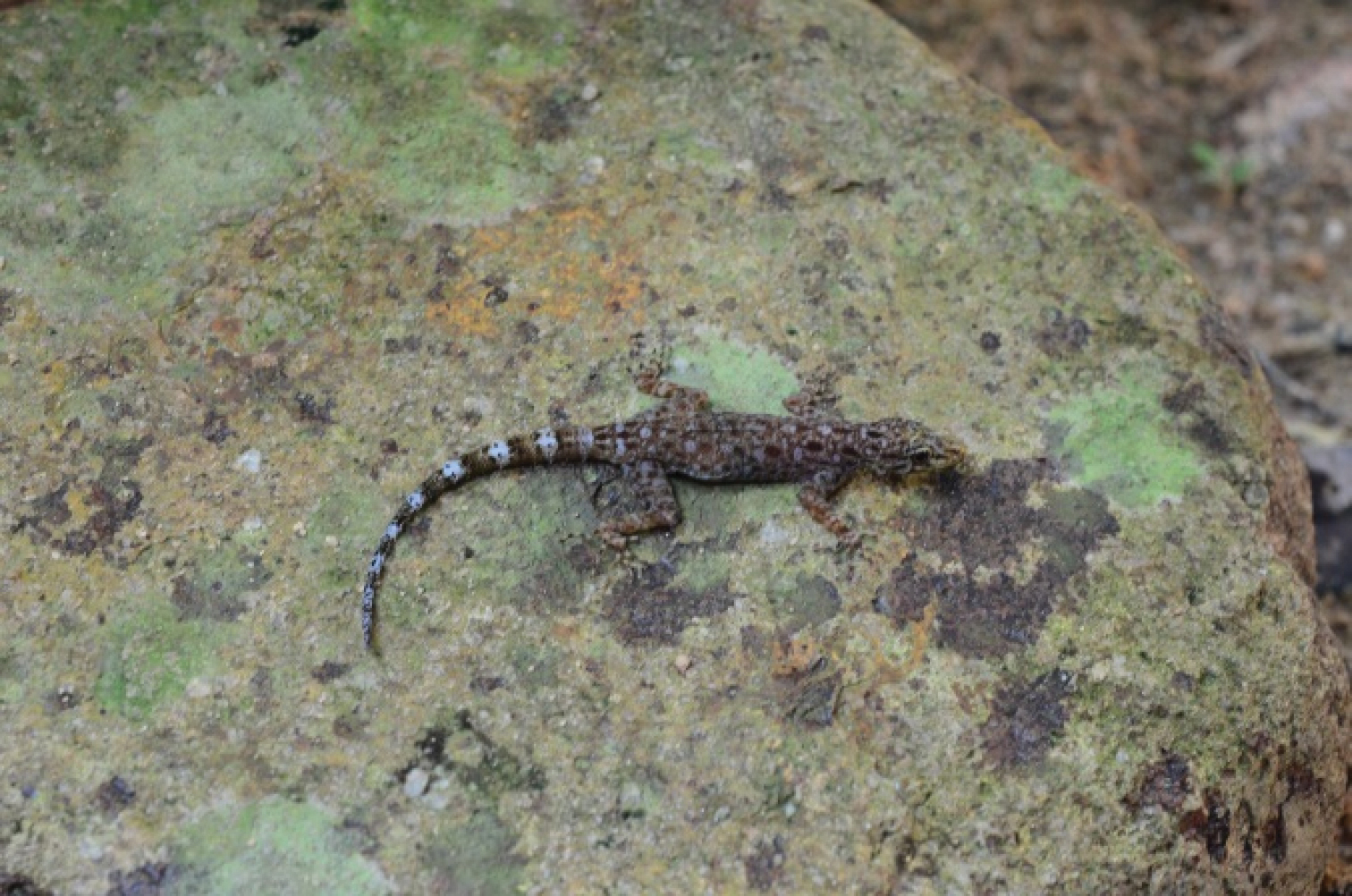

Scientific classification
- Kingdom: Animalia
- Phylum: Chordata
- Class: Reptilia
- Order: Squamata
- Suborder: Gekkota
- Family: Gekkonidae
- Genus: Cnemaspis
- Species: C. bidongensis

Binomial name
- Cnemaspis bidongensis Grismer, Wood, Ahmad, Sumarli, Vazquez, Ismail, Nance, Mohd-amin, Othman, Rizaijessika, Kuss, Murdoc & Cobos, 2014

= Cnemaspis bidongensis =

Species of lizard

Cnemaspis bidongensis, also known as the Pulau Bidong rock gecko, is a species of gecko endemic to Malaysia.
