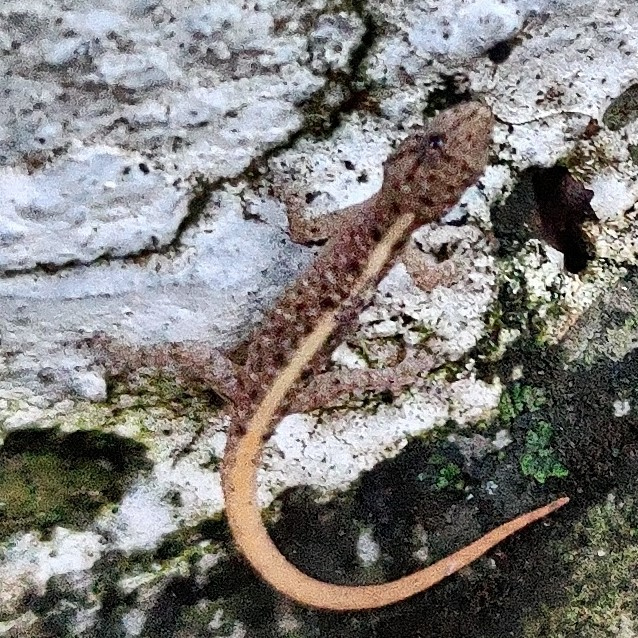

Scientific classification
- Kingdom: Animalia
- Phylum: Chordata
- Class: Reptilia
- Order: Squamata
- Suborder: Gekkota
- Family: Gekkonidae
- Genus: Cnemaspis
- Species: C. bangara

Binomial name
- Cnemaspis bangara Agarwal, Thackeray, Pal, & Khandekar, 2020

= Cnemaspis bangara =

Species of lizard

Cnemaspis bangara is a species of diurnal, rock-dwelling, insectivorous gecko endemic to India. It is found in Karnataka.
