= Cnemaspis sundainsula =

Scientific classification
- Kingdom: Animalia
- Phylum: Chordata
- Class: Reptilia
- Order: Squamata
- Suborder: Gekkota
- Family: Gekkonidae
- Genus: Cnemaspis
- Species: C. sundainsula

Binomial name
- Cnemaspis sundainsula Grismer et al., 2014

Species of lizard

Cnemaspis sundainsula is a species of gecko from Pulau Natuna Besar, Indonesia.
