= Cnemaspis jayaweerai =

Scientific classification
- Kingdom: Animalia
- Phylum: Chordata
- Class: Reptilia
- Order: Squamata
- Suborder: Gekkota
- Family: Gekkonidae
- Genus: Cnemaspis
- Species: C. jayaweerai

Binomial name
- Cnemaspis jayaweerai Karunarathna, Ukuwela, De Silva, Bauer, Madawala, Poyarkov, Botejue, Gabadage, Grismer, & Gorin, 2023

Species of lizard

Cnemaspis jayaweerai is a species of diurnal, rock-dwelling, insectivorous gecko endemic to Sri Lanka.
