= Cnemaspis selenolagus =

Scientific classification
- Kingdom: Animalia
- Phylum: Chordata
- Class: Reptilia
- Order: Squamata
- Suborder: Gekkota
- Family: Gekkonidae
- Genus: Cnemaspis
- Species: C. selenolagus

Binomial name
- Cnemaspis selenolagus Grismer, Yushchenko, Pawangkhanant, Nazarov, Naiduangchan, Suwannapoom, & Poyarkov, 2020

Species of lizard

Cnemaspis selenolagus is a species of diurnal gecko endemic to Thailand, specifically, the Thai-Malay Peninsula.

It is noted for its sharp color change from yellow-orange to brown-gray. It allows them to blend into the lichens and dry moss that cover the surfaces of the rocks and evergreen tropical trees of the region. This is a common survival feature among other Cnemaspis species.

During the day, Cnemaspis selenolagus spends its time on tree bark or rocks. At night, it takes shelter under tree bark and in the cracks of large boulders. Additionally, it gravitates towards areas which include rocky streams. It is presumed to be a habitat generalist.

It is the sixteenth Cnemaspis species in Thailand. Eleven of those fall under the group of C. siamensis, which are endemic to the Thai-Malay Peninsula. As a result of geographic barriers in the peninsula, two clades have formed within C. siamensis. Cnemaspis selenolagus falls under the northern clade, meaning it resides in the northern side of the Thai-Malay Peninsula.
