= Pemanggil Island rock gecko =

Scientific classification
- Kingdom: Animalia
- Phylum: Chordata
- Class: Reptilia
- Order: Squamata
- Suborder: Gekkota
- Family: Gekkonidae
- Genus: Cnemaspis
- Species: C. pemanggilensis

Binomial name
- Cnemaspis pemanggilensis Grismer & Das, 2006

Species of lizard

The Pemanggil Island rock gecko (Cnemaspis pemanggilensis) is a species of gecko endemic to Pemanggil Island in Malaysia.
