= Cnemaspis alwisi =

Scientific classification
- Kingdom: Animalia
- Phylum: Chordata
- Class: Reptilia
- Order: Squamata
- Suborder: Gekkota
- Family: Gekkonidae
- Genus: Cnemaspis
- Species: C. alwisi

Binomial name
- Cnemaspis alwisi Wickramasinghe & Munindradasa, 2007

Species of lizard

Cnemaspis alwisi, also known commonly as Alwis' day gecko or Alwis's day gecko, is a species of diurnal lizard in the family Gekkonidae. The species is endemic to the island of Sri Lanka.

== Etymology ==
The specific name, alwisi, is in honor of Sri Lankan zoologist Lyn de Alwis (1930–2006) for his work in wildlife conservation.

== Description ==
Adults of C. alwisi have a snout-to-vent length (SVL) of 33–40 mm (1.3–1.6 in).

== Reproduction ==
C. alwisi is oviparous.
