= Cnemaspis maculicollis =

Scientific classification
- Kingdom: Animalia
- Phylum: Chordata
- Class: Reptilia
- Order: Squamata
- Suborder: Gekkota
- Family: Gekkonidae
- Genus: Cnemaspis
- Species: C. maculicollis

Binomial name
- Cnemaspis maculicollis Cyria, Johny, Umesh, & Palot, 2018

Species of lizard

Cnemaspis maculicollis is a species of gecko found in India.
