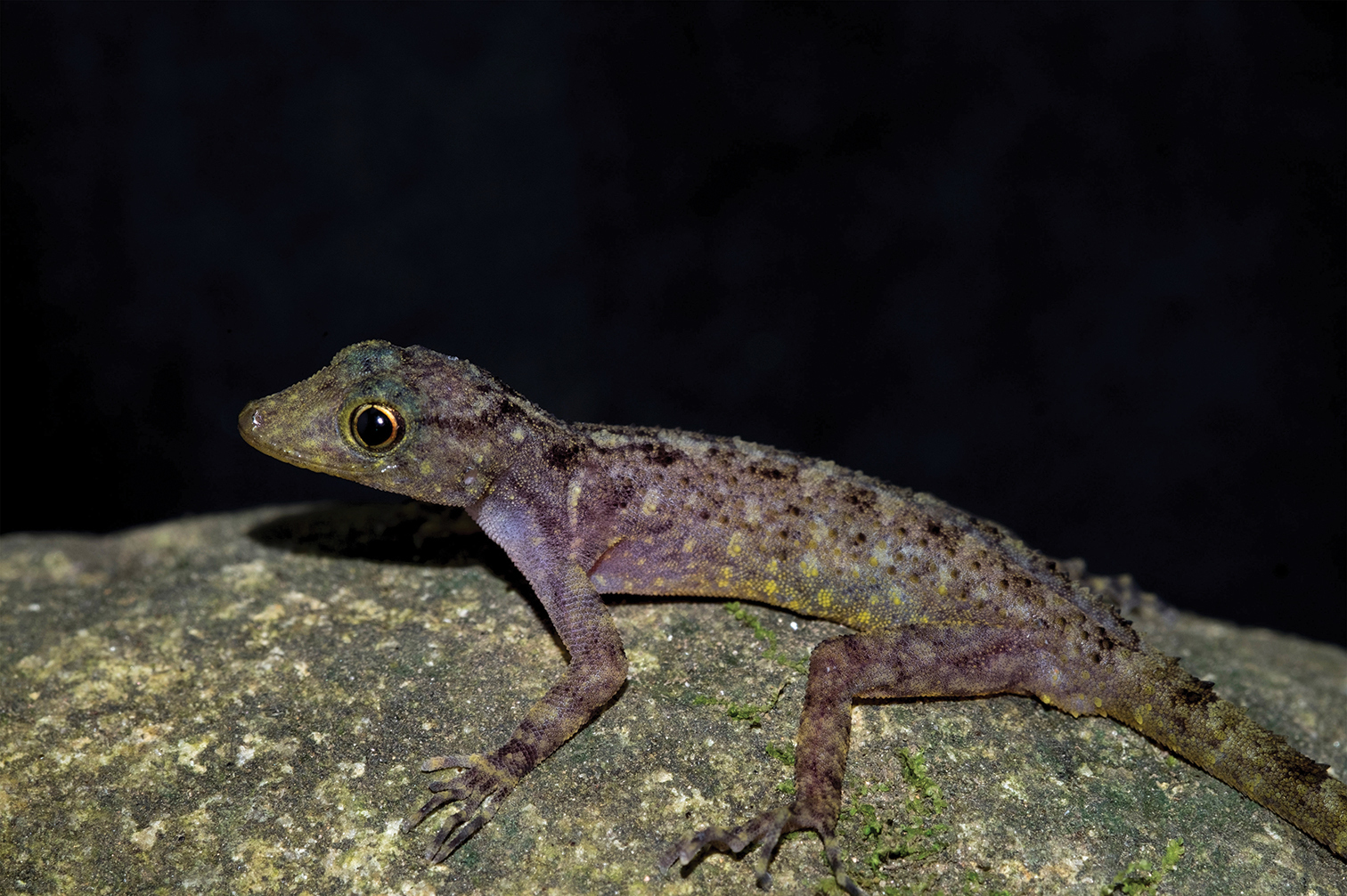

Scientific classification
- Kingdom: Animalia
- Phylum: Chordata
- Class: Reptilia
- Order: Squamata
- Suborder: Gekkota
- Family: Gekkonidae
- Genus: Cnemaspis
- Species: C. lineatubercularis

Binomial name
- Cnemaspis lineatubercularis Ampai, Wood, Stuart, & Aowphol, 2020

= Cnemaspis lineatubercularis =

Species of lizard

Cnemaspis lineatubercularis is a species of gecko endemic to Thailand. It has only been documented in the rocky sections of streams surrounding Wang Mai Pak Waterfall in the Kamlon subdivision of Lan Saka district in the country's Nakhon Si Thammarat province. It is distinct from other similar species by having para-vertebral tubercles in a linear arrangement, which is also from where it gets its name. It prefers dry and cool rocky boulders, though may go underwater if disturbed.
