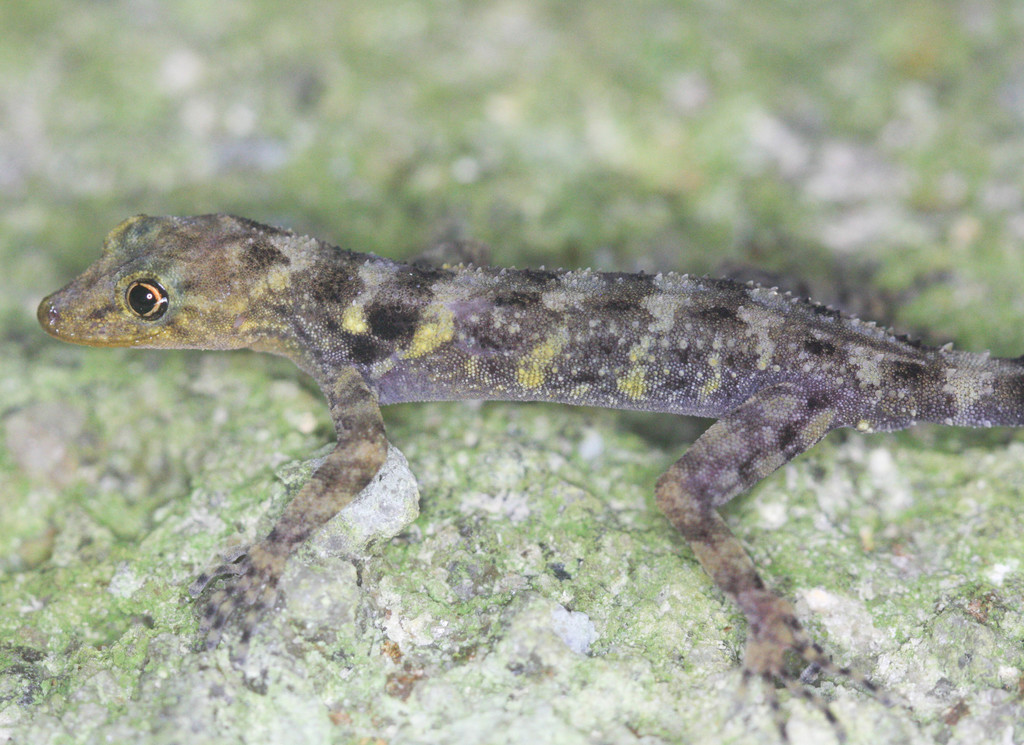

Scientific classification
- Domain: Eukaryota
- Kingdom: Animalia
- Phylum: Chordata
- Class: Reptilia
- Order: Squamata
- Infraorder: Gekkota
- Family: Gekkonidae
- Genus: Cnemaspis
- Species: C. affinis

Binomial name
- Cnemaspis affinis ( Stoliczka, 1870)

Synonyms
- Cyrtodactylus affinis; Gymnodactylus affinis; Gonatodes affinis

= Cnemaspis affinis =

Species of lizard

Cnemaspis affinis, also known as Stoliczka's gecko or Pinang Island rock gecko, is a species of gecko endemic to Malaysia.
