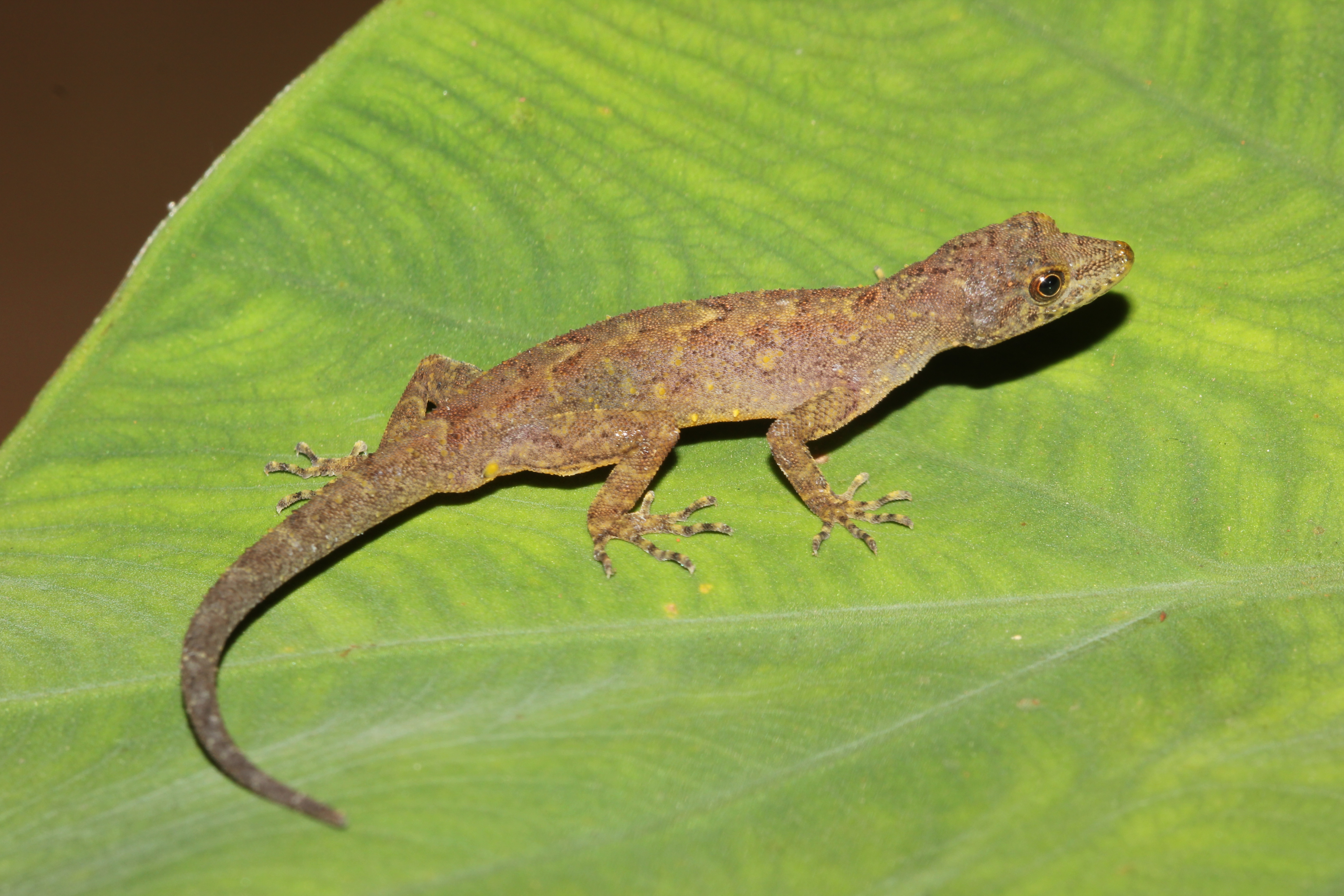

Scientific classification
- Kingdom: Animalia
- Phylum: Chordata
- Class: Reptilia
- Order: Squamata
- Suborder: Gekkota
- Family: Gekkonidae
- Genus: Cnemaspis
- Species: C. flaviventralis

Binomial name
- Cnemaspis flaviventralis Sayyed, Pyron, and Dahanukar, 2016

= Cnemaspis flaviventralis =

Species of lizard

Cnemaspis flaviventralis is a species of geckos described from the hills of Amboli, Maharashtra, India. Its common name is yellow-bellied day gecko.
