= Cnemaspis ranganaensis =

Scientific classification
- Kingdom: Animalia
- Phylum: Chordata
- Class: Reptilia
- Order: Squamata
- Suborder: Gekkota
- Family: Gekkonidae
- Genus: Cnemaspis
- Species: C. ranganaensis

Binomial name
- Cnemaspis ranganaensis Sayyed & Sulakhe, 2020

Species of lizard

Cnemaspis ranganaensis is a species of diurnal gecko endemic to India.
