= Cnemaspis tanintharyi =

Scientific classification
- Kingdom: Animalia
- Phylum: Chordata
- Class: Reptilia
- Order: Squamata
- Suborder: Gekkota
- Family: Gekkonidae
- Genus: Cnemaspis
- Species: C. tanintharyi

Binomial name
- Cnemaspis tanintharyi Lee, Miller, Zug, & Mulcahy, 2019

Species of lizard

Cnemaspis tanintharyi, the Tanintharyi rock gecko, is a species of diurnal, rock-dwelling, insectivorous gecko endemic to Myanmar. It is distributed in the Tanintharyi Region.
