= Cnemaspis sirehensis =

Scientific classification
- Kingdom: Animalia
- Phylum: Chordata
- Class: Reptilia
- Order: Squamata
- Suborder: Gekkota
- Family: Gekkonidae
- Genus: Cnemaspis
- Species: C. sirehensis

Binomial name
- Cnemaspis sirehensis Nashriq, Davis, Bauer, & Das, 2022

Species of lizard

Cnemaspis sirehensis is a species of gecko endemic to Malaysia.
