= Cnemaspis mahsuriae =

Scientific classification
- Kingdom: Animalia
- Phylum: Chordata
- Class: Reptilia
- Order: Squamata
- Suborder: Gekkota
- Family: Gekkonidae
- Genus: Cnemaspis
- Species: C. mahsuriae

Binomial name
- Cnemaspis mahsuriae Grismer, Wood, Quah, Anuar, Ngadi & Ahmad, 2015

Species of lizard

Cnemaspis mahsuriae, also known as Mahsuri's rock gecko, is a species of gecko endemic to Malaysia.
