= Cnemaspis biocellata =

Scientific classification
- Kingdom: Animalia
- Phylum: Chordata
- Class: Reptilia
- Order: Squamata
- Suborder: Gekkota
- Family: Gekkonidae
- Genus: Cnemaspis
- Species: C. biocellata

Binomial name
- Cnemaspis biocellata Grismer, Chan, Nasir & Sumontha, 2008

Species of lizard

Cnemaspis biocellata, also known as the twin-spot rock gecko, is a species of gecko endemic to western Malaysia.
