= Cnemaspis stongensis =

Scientific classification
- Kingdom: Animalia
- Phylum: Chordata
- Class: Reptilia
- Order: Squamata
- Suborder: Gekkota
- Family: Gekkonidae
- Genus: Cnemaspis
- Species: C. stongensis

Binomial name
- Cnemaspis stongensis Grismer et al., 2014

Species of lizard

Cnemaspis stongensis is a species of gecko from Gunung Stong, Kelantan, Malaysia.
