= Cnemaspis amba =

Scientific classification
- Kingdom: Animalia
- Phylum: Chordata
- Class: Reptilia
- Order: Squamata
- Suborder: Gekkota
- Family: Gekkonidae
- Genus: Cnemaspis
- Species: C. amba

Binomial name
- Cnemaspis amba Khandekar, Thackeray, & Agarwal, 2019

Species of lizard

Cnemaspis amba, the Amba dwarf gecko, is a species of diurnal, rock-dwelling, insectivorous gecko endemic to India. It is distributed in Maharashtra.
