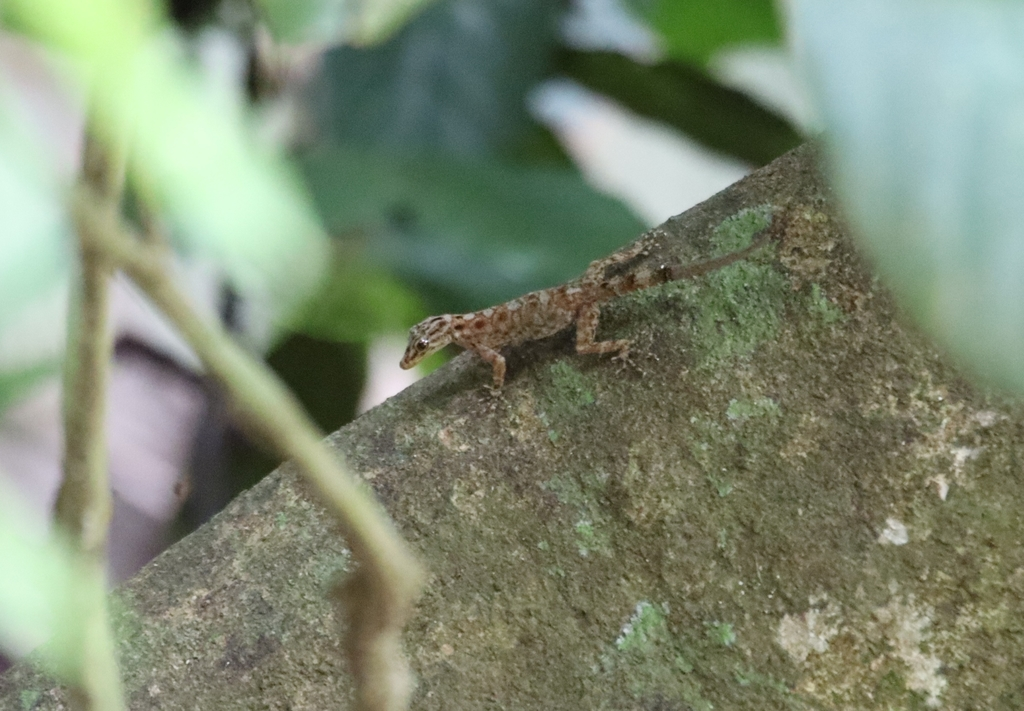
- This photo was taken near Bandar Lampung (Indonesia) by Zareva Aria Bayu

Scientific classification
- Kingdom: Animalia
- Phylum: Chordata
- Class: Reptilia
- Order: Squamata
- Suborder: Gekkota
- Family: Gekkonidae
- Genus: Cnemaspis
- Species: C. rajabasa

Binomial name
- Cnemaspis rajabasa Amarasinghe, Harvey, Riyanto & Smith, 2015

= Cnemaspis rajabasa =

Species of lizard

Cnemaspis rajabasa is a species of gecko endemic to southern Sumatra in Indonesia.
