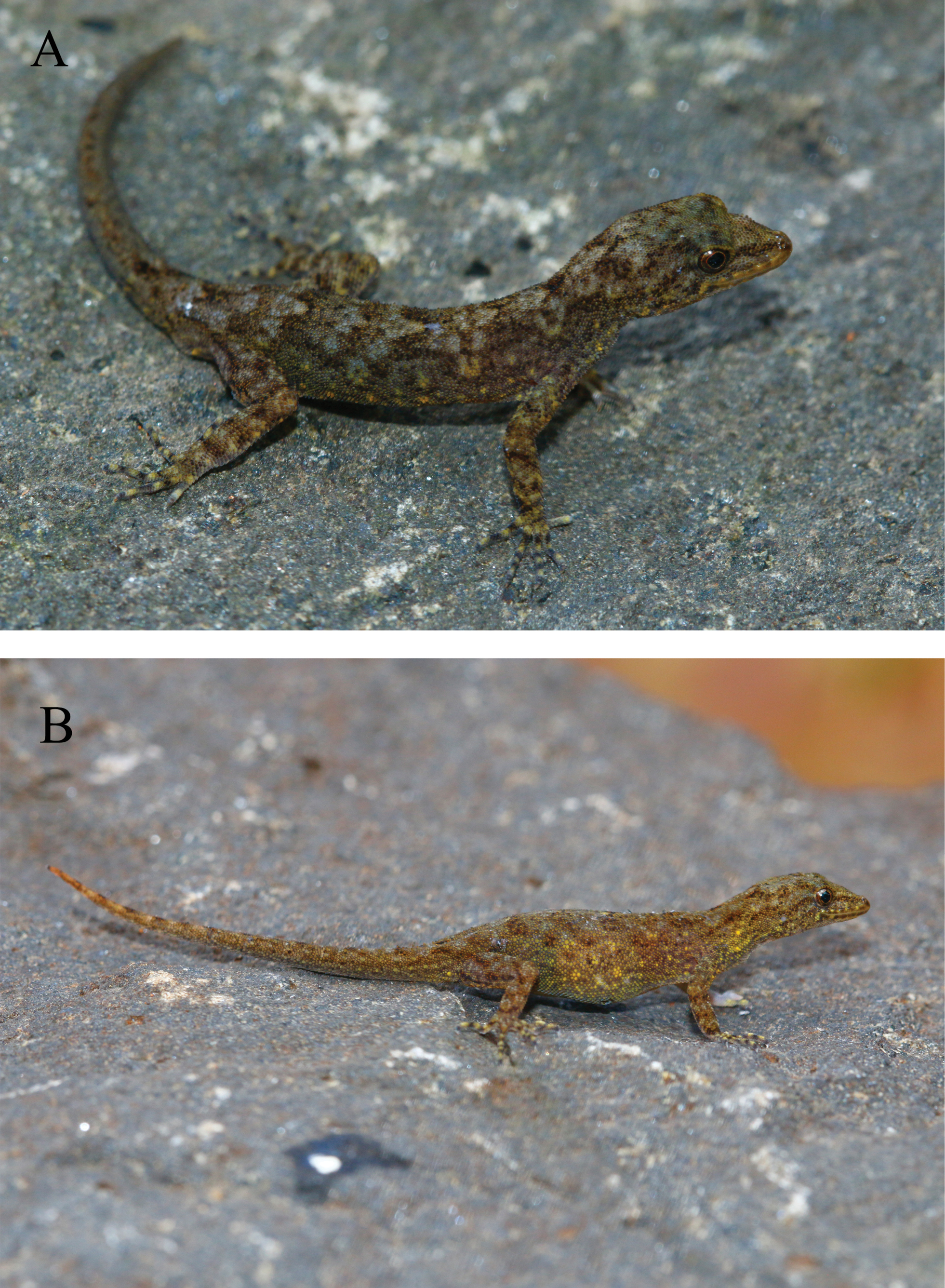

Scientific classification
- Kingdom: Animalia
- Phylum: Chordata
- Class: Reptilia
- Order: Squamata
- Suborder: Gekkota
- Family: Gekkonidae
- Genus: Cnemaspis
- Species: C. rajgadensis

Binomial name
- Cnemaspis rajgadensis Sayyed, Cyriac, Pardeshi, & Sulakhe, 2021

= Cnemaspis rajgadensis =

Species of lizard

Cnemaspis rajgadensis is a species of diurnal, rock-dwelling, insectivorous gecko endemic to India. It is distributed in Maharashtra.
