= Cnemaspis dezwaani =

Scientific classification
- Kingdom: Animalia
- Phylum: Chordata
- Class: Reptilia
- Order: Squamata
- Suborder: Gekkota
- Family: Gekkonidae
- Genus: Cnemaspis
- Species: C. dezwaani

Binomial name
- Cnemaspis dezwaani Das, 2005

Species of lizard

Cnemaspis dezwaani is a species of gecko, a lizard in the family Gekkonidae. The species is endemic to Indonesia.

== Etymology ==
The specific name, dezwaani, is in honor of Dutch anthropologist Johannes Pieter Kleiweg de Zwaan.
