= Cnemaspis bayuensis =

Scientific classification
- Kingdom: Animalia
- Phylum: Chordata
- Class: Reptilia
- Order: Squamata
- Suborder: Gekkota
- Family: Gekkonidae
- Genus: Cnemaspis
- Species: C. bayuensis

Binomial name
- Cnemaspis bayuensis Grismer, Grismer, Wood & Chan, 2008

Species of lizard

Cnemaspis bayuensis, also known as Kampung Bayu rock gecko, Gua Bayu rock gecko, or Bayu Cave rock gecko, is a species of gecko endemic to western Malaysia.
