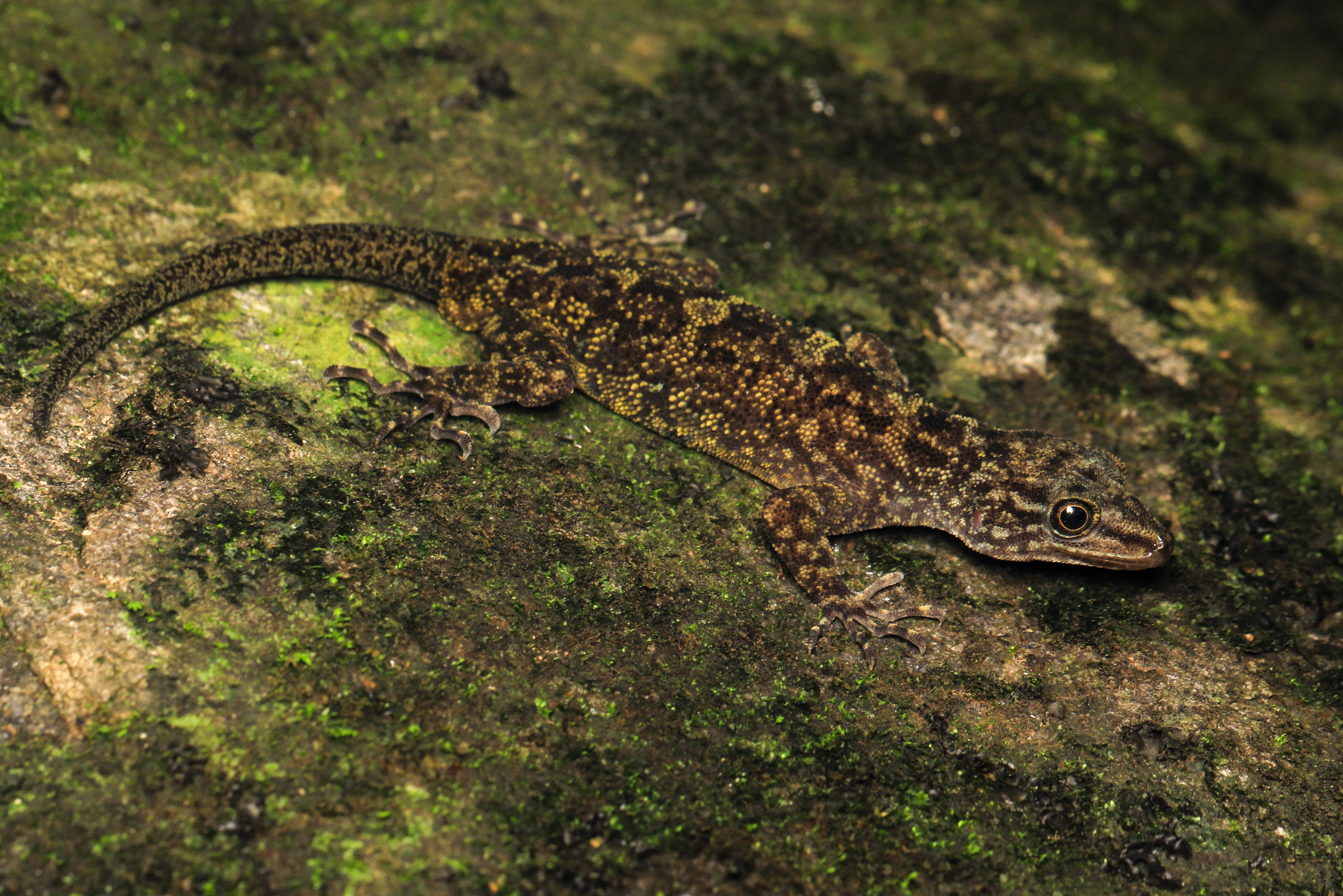
- Cnemaspsis zacharaii

Scientific classification
- Kingdom: Animalia
- Phylum: Chordata
- Class: Reptilia
- Order: Squamata
- Suborder: Gekkota
- Family: Gekkonidae
- Genus: Cnemaspis
- Species: C. zacharyi

Binomial name
- Cnemaspis zacharyi Cyriac, Palot, Deuti, & Umesh, 2020

= Cnemaspis zacharyi =

Species of lizard

Cnemaspis zacharyi is a species of diurnal, rock-dwelling, insectivorous gecko endemic to India. It is distributed in Kerala.
