= Cnemaspis nuicamensis =

Scientific classification
- Kingdom: Animalia
- Phylum: Chordata
- Class: Reptilia
- Order: Squamata
- Suborder: Gekkota
- Family: Gekkonidae
- Genus: Cnemaspis
- Species: C. nuicamensis

Binomial name
- Cnemaspis nuicamensis Grismer & Ngo, 2007

Species of lizard

Cnemaspis nuicamensis, also known as Nui Cam Hill rock gecko, is a species of gecko endemic to southern Vietnam.
