= Cnemaspis nigridia =

Scientific classification
- Domain: Eukaryota
- Kingdom: Animalia
- Phylum: Chordata
- Class: Reptilia
- Order: Squamata
- Infraorder: Gekkota
- Family: Gekkonidae
- Genus: Cnemaspis
- Species: C. nigridia

Binomial name
- Cnemaspis nigridia (Smith, 1925)

Synonyms
- Gonatodes nigridius; Cnemaspis nigridius

Species of lizard

Cnemaspis nigridia, also known as the Borneo black gecko or black-spotted rock gecko, is a species of gecko found in Malaysia and Indonesia.
