= Cnemaspis matahari =

Scientific classification
- Kingdom: Animalia
- Phylum: Chordata
- Class: Reptilia
- Order: Squamata
- Suborder: Gekkota
- Family: Gekkonidae
- Genus: Cnemaspis
- Species: C. matahari

Binomial name
- Cnemaspis matahari Nashriq, Davis, Bauer, & Das, 2022

Species of lizard

Cnemaspis matahari is a species of gecko endemic to Malaysia.
