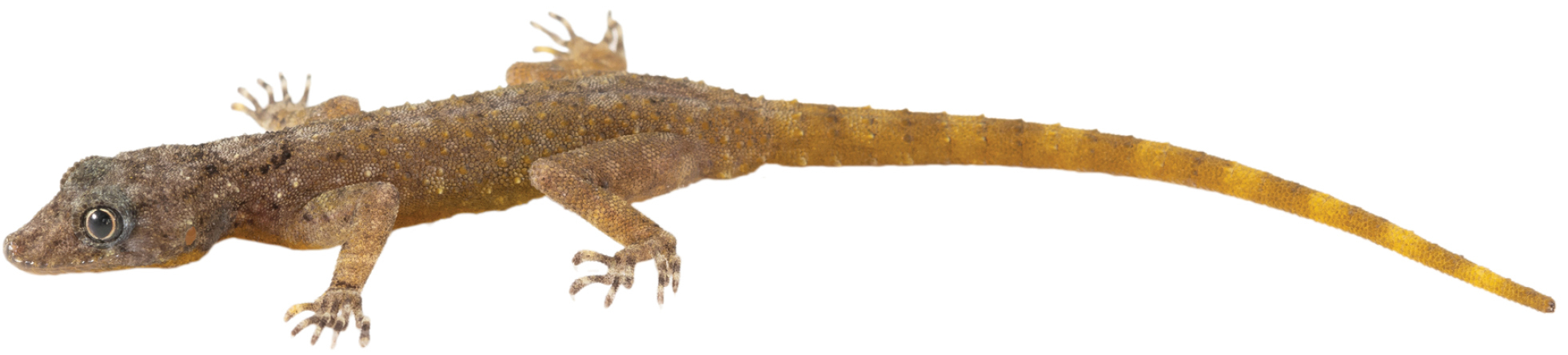

Scientific classification
- Kingdom: Animalia
- Phylum: Chordata
- Class: Reptilia
- Order: Squamata
- Suborder: Gekkota
- Family: Gekkonidae
- Genus: Cnemaspis
- Species: C. auriventralis

Binomial name
- Cnemaspis auriventralis Rujirawan, Yodthong, Ampai, Termprayoon, Aksornneam, Stuart, & Aowphol, 2022

= Cnemaspis auriventralis =

Species of lizard

Cnemaspis auriventralis, the Erawan rock gecko, is a species of diurnal, rock-dwelling, insectivorous gecko endemic to Thailand.
