= Cnemaspis flavigaster =

Scientific classification
- Kingdom: Animalia
- Phylum: Chordata
- Class: Reptilia
- Order: Squamata
- Suborder: Gekkota
- Family: Gekkonidae
- Genus: Cnemaspis
- Species: C. flavigaster

Binomial name
- Cnemaspis flavigaster Chan & Grismer, 2008

Species of lizard

Cnemaspis flavigaster, also known as the orange-bellied rock gecko, is a species of gecko endemic to Malaysia.
