= Cnemaspis pachaimalaiensis =

Scientific classification
- Kingdom: Animalia
- Phylum: Chordata
- Class: Reptilia
- Order: Squamata
- Suborder: Gekkota
- Family: Gekkonidae
- Genus: Cnemaspis
- Species: C. pachaimalaiensis

Binomial name
- Cnemaspis pachaimalaiensis Agarwal, Thackeray, & Khandekar, 2022

Species of lizard

Cnemaspis pachaimalaiensis, the Pachaimalai dwarf gecko, is a species of diurnal, rock-dwelling, insectivorous gecko endemic to India.

The species name refers to its type locality, the Pachaimalai Hills.
