= Cnemaspis wicksi =

Scientific classification
- Domain: Eukaryota
- Kingdom: Animalia
- Phylum: Chordata
- Class: Reptilia
- Order: Squamata
- Infraorder: Gekkota
- Family: Gekkonidae
- Genus: Cnemaspis
- Species: C. wicksi

Binomial name
- Cnemaspis wicksi (Stoliczka, 1873)

Synonyms
- Gymnodactylus wicksi

Species of lizard

Cnemaspis wicksi is a species of gecko endemic to the Andaman Islands.
