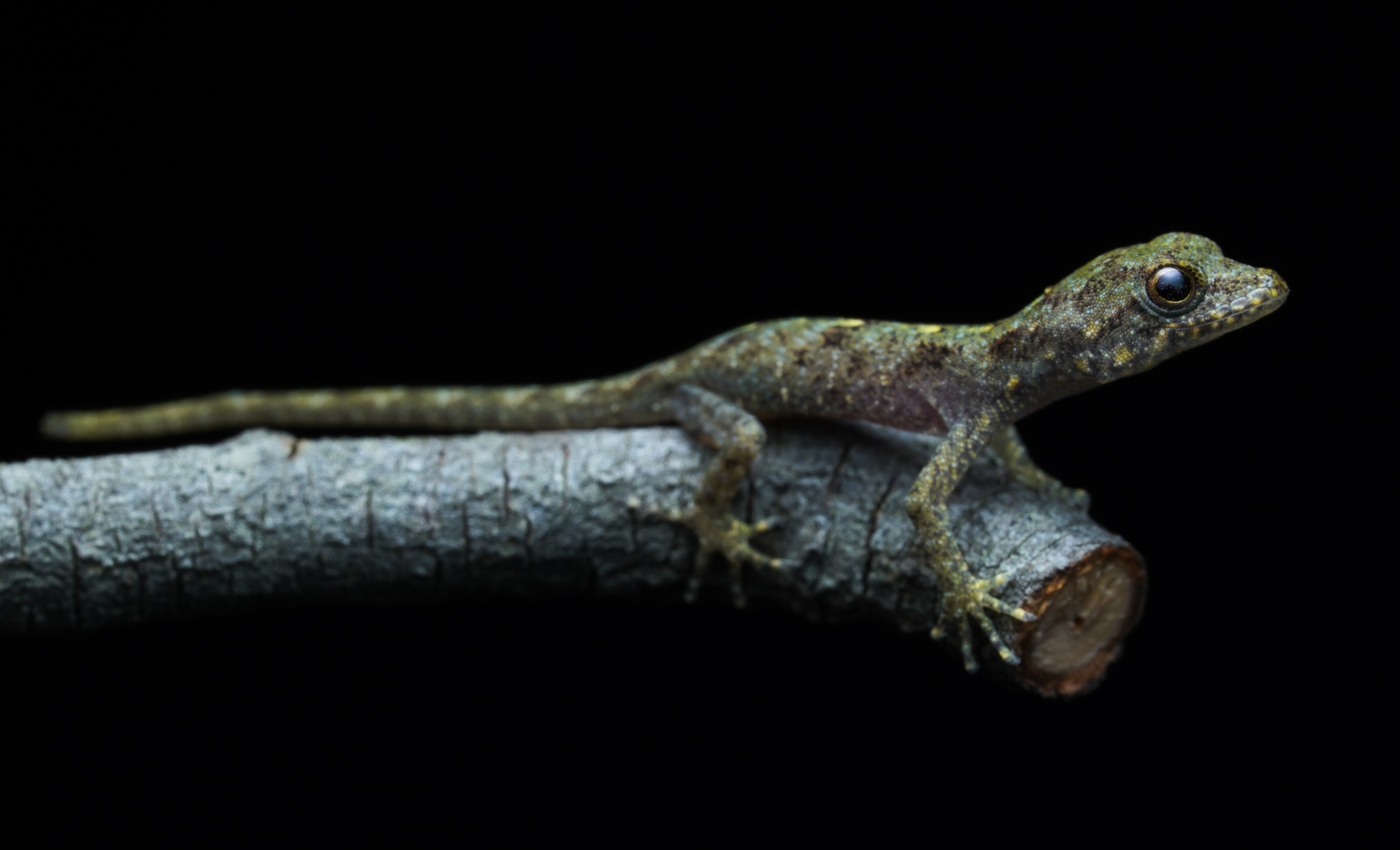

Scientific classification
- Kingdom: Animalia
- Phylum: Chordata
- Order: Squamata
- Suborder: Gekkota
- Family: Gekkonidae
- Genus: Cnemaspis
- Species: C. anandani

Binomial name
- Cnemaspis anandani Murthy, Nitesh, Sengupta, & Deepak, 2019

= Cnemaspis anandani =

Species of lizard

Cnemaspis anandani, Anandan's day gecko, is a species of diurnal, rock-dwelling, insectivorous gecko endemic to India. It is distributed in Tamil Nadu.
