= List of reptiles of India =

There are 870 species of reptiles that have been recorded in India. About 58% of these species are endemic to the country (represented by "E"). The Western Ghats and Andaman and Nicobar Islands constitute the major endemic zones, and along with the Himalayas, are amongst the reptilian hotspots.

== Order Crocodilia ==
=== Family Crocodilidae ===
- Mugger crocodile, Crocodylus palustris
- Saltwater crocodile, Crocodylus porosus

=== Family Gavialiidae ===
- Gharial, Gavialis gangeticus

== Order Testudines ==
=== Family Dermochelyidae ===
- Leatherback sea turtle, Dermochelys coriacea

=== Family Cheloniidae ===
- Loggerhead sea turtle, Caretta caretta
- Green turtle, Chelonia mydas
- Hawksbill sea turtle, Eretmochelys imbricata
- Olive ridley sea turtle, Lepidochelys olivacea

=== Family Testudinidae ===
- Indian star tortoise, Geochelone elegans
- Elongated tortoise, Indotestudo elongata
- Travancore tortoise, Indotestudo travancorica (E)
- Asian brown tortoise, Manouria emys
- Impressed tortoise, Manouria impressa

=== Family Geoemydidae ===
- Northern river terrapin, Batagur baska
- Three-striped roofed turtle, Batagur dhongoka
- Red-crowned roofed turtle, Batagur kachuga
- Burmese box turtle, Cuora lineata
- Keeled box turtle, Cuora mouhotii
- Assam box turtle, Cuora praschagi
- Assam leaf turtle, Cyclemys gemeli
- Black pond turtle, Geoclemys hamiltonii
- Oldham's leaf turtle, Cyclemys oldhami
- Brahminy river turtle, Hardella thurjii
- Tricarinate hill turtle, Melanochelys tricarinata
- Indian black turtle, Melanochelys trijuga
- Indian eyed turtle, Morenia petersi
- Brown roofed turtle, Pangshura smithii
- Assam roofed turtle, Pangshura sylhetensis
- Indian roofed turtle, Pangshura tecta
- Indian tent turtle, Pangshura tentoria
- Cochin Forest cane turtle, Vijayachelys silvatica (E)

=== Family Trionychidae ===
- Southeast Asian softshell turtle, Amyda ornata
- Indian narrow-headed softshell turtle, Chitra indica
- Indian flapshell turtle, Lissemys punctata
- Burmese peacock softshell turtle, Nilssonia formosa
- Indian softshell turtle, Nilssonia gangetica
- Indian peacock softshell turtle, Nilssonia hurum
- Leith's softshell turtle, Nilssonia leithii
- Black softshell turtle, Nilssonia nigricans
- Asian giant softshell turtle, Pelochelys cantorii

== Order Squamata ==
=== Family Eublepharidae ===
- West Indian leopard gecko, Eublepharis fuscus (E)
- East Indian leopard gecko, Eublepharis hardwickii
- Jhuma's leopard gecko, Eublepharis jhuma (E)
- Leopard gecko, Eublepharis macularius
- Painted leopard gecko, Eublepharis pictus (E)
- Satpura leopard gecko, Eublepharis satpuraensis (E)

=== Family Gekkonidae ===
- Frontier bow-fingered gecko, Altiphylax stoliczkai
- Sind gecko, Bunopus orientalis
- Indian golden gecko, Calodactylodes aureus (E)
- Thenmala day gecko, Cnemaspis aaronbaueri (E)
- Adi's day gecko, Cnemaspis adii (E)
- Agamalai day gecko, Cnemaspis agamalaiensis (E)
- Agarwal's dwarf gecko, Cnemaspis agarwali (E)
- Agaya Gangai dwarf gecko, Cnemaspis agayagangai (E)
- Ajija's day gecko, Cnemaspis ajijae (E)
- Amba dwarf gecko, Cnemaspis amba (E)
- Amboli day gecko, Cnemaspis amboliensis (E)
- Anaimalai dwarf gecko, Cnemaspis anaimalaiensis (E)
- Anaimudi round-eyed gecko, Cnemaspis anamudiensis (E)
- Anandan's day gecko, Cnemaspis anandani (E)
- Andaman round-eyed gecko, Cnemaspis andersonii (E)
- Anuradha's dwarf gecko, Cnemaspis anuradhae (E)
- Assam day gecko, Cnemaspis assamensis
- Tirunelveli round-eyed gecko, Cnemaspis australis (E)
- Sabin's Nellore dwarf gecko, Cnemaspis avasabinae (E)
- Thirukurundugi rock gecko, Cnemaspis azhagu (E)
- Balerion forest gecko, Cnemaspis balerion (E)
- Golden-banded dwarf gecko, Cnemaspis bangara (E)
- Barki dwarf gecko, Cnemaspis barkiensis (E)
- Basalt dwarf gecko, Cnemaspis basalticola (E)
- Beddome's day gecko, Cnemaspis beddomei (E)
- Boie's day gecko, Cnemaspis boiei (E)
- Brahmaputra day gecko, Cnemaspis brahmaputra (E)
- Cave-dwelling dwarf gecko, Cnemaspis cavernicola (E)
- Chandoli dwarf gecko, Cnemaspis chandoliensis (E)
- Chengodumala rock gecko, Cnemaspis chengodumalaensis (E)
- Fantastic dwarf gecko, Cnemaspis fantastica (E)
- Yellow-throated round-eyed gecko, Cnemaspis flavigularis (E)
- Yellow-bellied day gecko, Cnemaspis flaviventralis (E)
- Brave dwarf gecko, Cnemaspis fortis (E)
- Galaxy day gecko, Cnemaspis galaxia (E)
- Ganeshaiah's dwarf gecko, Cnemaspis ganeshaiahi (E)
- Geetha Iyer's dwarf gecko, Cnemaspis geethaiyerae (E)
- Giri's day gecko, Cnemaspis girii (E)
- Goan day gecko, Cnemaspis goaensis (E)
- Slender day gecko, Cnemaspis gracilis (E)
- Granite dwarf gecko, Cnemaspis graniticola (E)
- Strange-scaled round-eyed gecko, Cnemaspis heteropholis (E)
- Indian day gecko, Cnemaspis indica (E)
- Jackie's day gecko, Cnemaspis jackieii (E)
- Jerdon's day gecko, Cnemaspis jerdonii (E)
- Kalakkad rock gecko, Cnemaspis kalakadensis (E)
- Kalsubai dwarf gecko, Cnemaspis kalsubaiensis (E)
- Kanyakumari dwarf gecko, Cnemaspis kanyakumariensis (E)
- Kolhapur day gecko, Cnemaspis kolhapurensis (E)
- Kottiyoor day gecko, Cnemaspis kottiyoorensis (E)
- Koyna dwarf gecko, Cnemaspis koynaensis (E)
- Krishnagiri dwarf gecko, Cnemaspis krishnagiriensis (E)
- Limaye's day gecko, Cnemaspis limayei (E)
- Sharavati rock gecko, Cnemaspis lithophilis (E)
- Coastal day gecko, Cnemaspis littoralis (E)
- Spot-collared dwarf gecko, Cnemaspis maculicollis (E)
- Magnificent dwarf gecko, Cnemaspis magnifica (E)
- Mahabal's day gecko, Cnemaspis mahabali (E)
- Maharashtra dwarf gecko, Cnemaspis maharashtraensis (E)
- Kerala round-eyed gecko, Cnemaspis monticola (E)
- Mundanthurai rock gecko, Cnemaspis mundanthuraiensis (E)
- Mysore day gecko, Cnemaspis mysoriensis (E)
- Ponmudi day gecko, Cnemaspis nairi (E)
- Nicobar day gecko, Cnemaspis nicobaricus (E)
- Black-bellied dwarf gecko, Cnemaspis nigriventris (E)
- Nilgiri day gecko, Cnemaspis nilagirica (E)
- Clouded forest gecko, Cnemaspis nimbus (E)
- Ornate day gecko, Cnemaspis ornata (E)
- Ota's day gecko, Cnemaspis otai (E)
- Pachaimalai dwarf gecko, Cnemaspis pachaimalaiensis (E)
- Pakkamalai dwarf gecko, Cnemaspis pakkamalaiensis (E)
- Palakkad dwarf gecko, Cnemaspis palakkadensis (E)
- Palani dwarf gecko, Cnemaspis palanica (E)
- Anaimalai ground-dwelling dwarf gecko, Cnemaspis persephone (E)
- Rajgad dwarf gecko, Cnemaspis rajgadensis (E)
- Rangana dwarf gecko, Cnemaspis ranganaensis (E)
- Rashid's dwarf gecko, Cnemaspis rashidi (E)
- Regal dwarf gecko, Cnemaspis regalis (E)
- Reticulated dwarf gecko, Cnemaspis reticulata (E)
- Rishi Valley dwarf gecko, Cnemaspis rishivalleyensis (E)
- Red-eyed dwarf gecko, Cnemaspis rubraoculus (E)
- Scarlet dwarf gecko, Cnemaspis rudhira (E)
- Sahyadri dwarf gecko, Cnemaspis sahyadriensis (E)
- Sakleshpur dwarf gecko, Cnemaspis sakleshpurensis (E)
- Salim Ali's dwarf gecko, Cnemaspis salimalii (E)
- Holy dwarf gecko, Cnemaspis sanctus (E)
- Sathuragiri dwarf gecko, Cnemaspis sathuragiriensis (E)
- Schaller's Sakleshpur dwarf gecko, Cnemaspis schalleri (E)
- Shevaroy dwarf gecko, Cnemaspis shevaroyensis (E)
- Sispara day gecko, Cnemaspis sisparensis (E)
- Smaug round-eyed gecko, Cnemaspis smaug (E)
- Stardust dwarf gecko, Cnemaspis stellapulvis (E)
- Sundar dwarf gecko, Cnemaspis sundara (E)
- Tenkasi dwarf gecko, Cnemaspis tenkasiensis (E)
- Thackeray's dwarf gecko, Cnemaspis thackerayi (E)
- Banded dwarf gecko, Cnemaspis tigris (E)
- Painted dwarf gecko, Cnemaspis triedra (E)
- Rough-bellied day gecko, Cnemaspis tropidogaster
- Umashaanker's dwarf gecko, Cnemaspis umashaankeri (E)
- Northern Hills dwarf gecko, Cnemaspis uttaraghati (E)
- Valparai dwarf gecko, Cnemaspis valparaiensis (E)
- Van Gogh's starry dwarf gecko, Cnemaspis vangoghi (E)
- Vijaya's dwarf gecko, Cnemaspis vijayae (E)
- Wallace's dwarf gecko, Cnemaspis wallaceii (E)
- Captain Wick's dwarf gecko, Cnemaspis wicksi (E)
- Wynad day gecko, Cnemaspis wynadensis (E)
- Yelagiri dwarf gecko, Cnemaspis yelagiriensis (E)
- Yercaud day gecko, Cnemaspis yercaudensis (E)
- Zachary's dwarf gecko, Cnemaspis zacharyi (E)
- Aaron Bauer's bent-toed gecko, Cyrtodactylus aaronbaueri (E)
- Adler's bow-fingered gecko, Cyrtodactylus adleri (E)
- Meghalaya bent-toed gecko, Cyrtodactylus agarwali (E)
- Deccan banded gecko, Cyrtodactylus albofasciatus (E)
- Aravind's ground gecko, Cyrtodactylus aravindi (E)
- Garo Hills bent-toed gecko, Cyrtodactylus bapme (E)
- Barail Hills bent-toed gecko, Cyrtodactylus barailensis (E)
- Bengkhuaia's bent-toed gecko, Cyrtodactylus bengkhuaiai (E)
- Bhupathy's bent-toed gecko, Cyrtodactylus bhupathyi (E)
- Camorta bent-toed gecko, Cyrtodactylus camortensis (E)
- Cayu bent-toed gecko, Cyrtodactylus cayuensis
- Chamba bent-toed gecko, Cyrtodactylus chamba (E)
- Coastal Kerala geckoella, Cyrtodactylus chengodumalaensis (E)
- Kollegal ground gecko, Cyrtodactylus collegalensis (E)
- Banded ground gecko, Cyrtodactylus deccanensis (E)
- Dima bent-toed gecko, Cyrtodactylus dimaensis (E)
- Meghalayan bent-toed gecko, Cyrtodactylus exercitus (E)
- Banded bent-toed gecko, Cyrtodactylus fasciolatus (E)
- Sikkimese bent-toed gecko, Cyrtodactylus gubernatoris (E)
- Guwahati bent-toed gecko, Cyrtodactylus guwahatiensis (E)
- Himachal bent-toed gecko, Cyrtodactylus himachalensis (E)
- Himalayan bent-toed gecko, Cyrtodactylus himalayanus (E)
- Darjeeling bent-toed gecko, Cyrtodactylus himalayicus (E)
- Irula geckoella, Cyrtodactylus irulaorum (E)
- Jaintia bent-toed gecko, Cyrtodactylus jaintiaensis (E)
- Jayaditya's forest bent-toed gecko, Cyrtodactylus jayadityai (E)
- Jaipore bent-toed gecko, Cyrtodactylus jeyporensis (E)
- Kalakad geckoella, Cyrtodactylus kalakadensis (E)
- Kameng bent-toed gecko, Cyrtodactylus kamengensis (E)
- Limestone-dwelling bent toed gecko, Cyrtodactylus karsticola (E)
- Kaziranga bent-toed gecko, Cyrtodactylus kazirangaensis (E)
- Khasi Hills bent-toed gecko, Cyrtodactylus khasiensis (E)
- Kiphire bent-toed gecko, Cyrtodactylus kiphire (E)
- Lawder's bent-toed gecko, Cyrtodactylus lawderanus (E)
- Lunglei bent-toed gecko, Cyrtodactylus lungleiensis (E)
- Manipur bent-toed gecko, Cyrtodactylus manipurensis (E)
- Jampui bent-toed gecko, Cyrtodactylus montanus (E)
- Nagaland bent-toed gecko, Cyrtodactylus nagalandensis (E)
- Namdapha bent-toed gecko, Cyrtodactylus namdaphaensis (E)
- Namtiram bent-toed gecko, Cyrtodactylus namtiram (E)
- Latpanchar bent-toed gecko, Cyrtodactylus nebulicola (E)
- Cloudy bent-toed gecko, Cyrtodactylus nebulosus (E)
- Ngengpui bent-toed gecko, Cyrtodactylus ngengpuiensis (E)
- Ngopa bent-toed gecko, Cyrtodactylus ngopensis (E)
- Car Nicobar bent-toed gecko, Cyrtodactylus nicobaricus (E)
- Raimona bent-toed gecko, Cyrtodactylus raimonaensis (E)
- Relict gecko, Cyrtodactylus relictus (E)
- Rishi Valley geckoella, Cyrtodactylus rishivalleyensis (E)
- Red bow-fingered gecko, Cyrtodactylus rubidus
- Satpura geckoella, Cyrtodactylus satpuraensis (E)
- Northern bent-toed gecko, Cyrtodactylus septentrionalis (E)
- Shenbagathoppu geckoella, Cyrtodactylus shenbagathoppuensis (E)
- Shivalik bent-toed gecko, Cyrtodactylus shivalikensis (E)
- Siaha bent-toed gecko, Cyrtodactylus siahaensis (E)
- Siang Valley bent-toed gecko, Cyrtodactylus siangensis (E)
- Forest spotted gecko, Cyrtodactylus speciosus (E)
- Bangalore geckoella, Cyrtodactylus srilekhae (E)
- Tripura bent-toed gecko, Cyrtodactylus tripuraensis
- Urban bent-toed gecko, Cyrtodactylus urbanus (E)
- Vairengte bent-toed gecko, Cyrtodactylus vairengtensis (E)
- Vanarakshaka bent-toed gecko, Cyrtodactylus vanarakshaka (E)
- Giri's geckoella, Cyrtodactylus varadgirii (E)
- Delhi rock gecko, Cyrtopodion aravallensis (E)
- Kachh rock gecko, Cyrtopodion kachhense
- Jammu bent-toed gecko, Cyrtopodion mansarulum (E)
- Salt Range gecko, Cyrtopodion montiumsalsorum
- Rough rock gecko, Cyrtopodion scabrum
- Vindhya rock gecko, Cyrtopodion vindhya (E)
- Anamalay gecko, Dravidogecko anamallensis (E)
- Beddome's dravidogecko, Dravidogecko beddomei (E)
- Coonoor dravidogecko, Dravidogecko coonoor (E)
- Adam's dravidogecko, Dravidogecko douglasadamsi (E)
- Janaki's dravidogecko, Dravidogecko janakiae (E)
- Meghamalai dravidogecko, Dravidogecko meghamalaiensis (E)
- Waynad dravidogecko, Dravidogecko septentrionalis (E)
- Smith's dravidogecko, Dravidogecko smithi (E)
- Kodaikanal dravidogecko, Dravidogecko tholpalli (E)
- Common four-clawed gecko, Gehyra mutilata
- Tokay gecko, Gekko gecko
- Horsfield's flying gecko, Gekko horsfieldii
- Smooth-backed gliding gecko, Gekko lionotum
- Mizoram parachute gecko, Gekko mizoramensis (E)
- Nicobar gliding gecko, Gekko nicobarensis (E)
- Makachua gecko, Gekko stoliczkai (E)
- Andaman giant gecko, Gekko verreauxi (E)
- Aaron Bauer's house gecko, Hemidactylus aaronbaueri (E)
- Spiny-scaled rock gecko, Hemidactylus acanthopholis (E)
- Emulous rock gecko, Hemidactylus aemulus (E)
- White-striped viper gecko, Hemidactylus albofasciatus (E)
- Amarasinghe's house gecko, Hemidactylus amarasinghei (E)
- Northern Burmese half-toed gecko, Hemidactylus aquilonius
- Aravalli house gecko, Hemidactylus aravalliensis (E)
- Nalgonda rock gecko, Hemidactylus cairnicola (E)
- Chikhaldara brookish gecko, Hemidactylus chikhaldaraensis (E)
- Central Indian leaf-toed gecko, Hemidactylus chipkali (E)
- Easa's rock gecko, Hemidactylus easai (E)
- Mahabubnagar yellow-tailed brookish gecko, Hemidactylus flavicaudus (E)
- Northern house gecko, Hemidactylus flaviviridis
- Common house gecko, Hemidactylus frenatus
- Indo-Pacific gecko, Hemidactylus garnotii
- Giant leaf-toed gecko, Hemidactylus giganteus (E)
- Gleadow's house gecko, Hemidactylus gleadowi
- Graceful leaf-toed gecko, Hemidactylus gracilis (E)
- Granite rock gecko, Hemidactylus graniticolus (E)
- Gujarat gecko, Hemidactylus gujaratensis (E)
- Hedge's gecko, Hemidactylus hegdei (E)
- Hemachandra's rock gecko, Hemidactylus hemchandrai (E)
- Kanger Valley rock gecko, Hemidactylus kangerensis (E)
- Kalinga rock gecko, Hemidactylus kalinga (E)
- Kolli rock gecko, Hemidactylus kolliensis (E)
- Koya rock gecko, Hemidactylus koyaorum (E)
- Leschenault's leaf-toed gecko, Hemidactylus leschenaultii
- Spotted leaf-toed gecko, Hemidactylus maculatus (E)
- Mahony's rock gecko, Hemidactylus mahonyi (E)
- Smith's bent-toed gecko, Hemidactylus malcolmsmithi (E)
- Madurai rock gecko, Hemidactylus multisulcatus (E)
- Murray's house gecko, Hemidactylus murrayi
- Travancore rock gecko, Hemidactylus paaragowli (E)
- Pakkamalai rock gecko, Hemidactylus pakkamalaiensis (E)
- Spotted house gecko, Hemidactylus parvimaculatus
- Few-banded termite hill gecko, Hemidactylus paucifasciatus (E)
- Persian leaf-toed gecko, Hemidactylus persicus
- Flat-tailed house gecko, Hemidactylus platyurus
- Bombay gecko, Hemidactylus prashadi (E)
- Quartzite brookish gecko, Hemidactylus quartziticolus (E)
- Deccan rock gecko, Hemidactylus raya (E)
- Reticulate leaf-toed gecko, Hemidactylus reticulatus (E)
- Rishi Valley rock gecko, Hemidactylus rishivalleyensis (E)
- Heyden's gecko, Hemidactylus robustus
- Sahgal's termite hill gecko, Hemidactylus sahgali
- Sankari brookish gecko, Hemidactylus sankariensis (E)
- Satara gecko, Hemidactylus sataraensis (E)
- Saxatile rock gecko, Hemidactylus saxicolus (E)
- Scaly gecko, Hemidactylus scabriceps
- Sirumalai rock gecko, Hemidactylus sirumalaiensis (E)
- Hampi rock gecko, Hemidactylus siva (E)
- Devarayana Durga Hills half-toed gecko, Hemidactylus srikanthani (E)
- Dutta's Mahendragiri gecko, Hemidactylus sushilduttai (E)
- Tamhini giant gecko, Hemidactylus tamhiniensis (E)
- Treutler's gecko, Hemidactylus treutleri (E)
- Blotched house gecko, Hemidactylus triedrus (E)
- Meghamalai rock gecko, Hemidactylus vanam (E)
- Giri's brookish gecko, Hemidactylus varadgirii (E)
- Vijayraghvan's rock gecko, Hemidactylus vijayraghavani (E)
- Whitaker's termite hill gecko, Hemidactylus whitakeri (E)
- Nalgonda yellow-tailed brookish gecko, Hemidactylus xericolus (E)
- Kanker rock gecko, Hemidactylus yajurvedi (E)
- Araku slender gecko, Hemiphyllodactylus arakuensis (E)
- Southern Ghats slender gecko, Hemiphyllodactylus aurantiacus (E)
- Goan slender gecko, Hemiphyllodactylus goaensis (E)
- Jnana slender gecko, Hemiphyllodactylus jnana (E)
- Kolli slender gecko, Hemiphyllodactylus kolliensis (E)
- Ganjam slender gecko, Hemiphyllodactylus minimus (E)
- Nilgiri slender gecko, Hemiphyllodactylus nilgiriensis (E)
- Kalakad Mundanthurai slender gecko, Hemiphyllodactylus peninsularis (E)
- Indopacific slender gecko, Hemiphyllodactylus typus
- Venkatadri slender gecko, Hemiphyllodactylus venkatadri (E)
- Mourning gecko, Lepidodactylus lugubris
- Persian dwarf gecko, Microgecko persicus
- Andaman day gecko, Phelsuma andamanensis (E)

=== Family Agamidae ===
- Indian kangaroo lizard, Agasthyagama beddomei (E)
- Northern kangaroo lizard, Agasthyagama edge (E)
- Green-crested lizard, Bronchocela cristatella
- Blue-eyed canopy agama, Bronchocela cyanopalpebra (E)
- Daniel's forest lizard, Bronchocela danieli (E)
- Nicobar canopy agama, Bronchocela nicobarica (E)
- Camorta canopy agama, Bronchocela rubrigularis (E)
- Rajasthan toad-headed lizard, Bufoniceps laungwalaensis
- Common green forest lizard, Calotes calotes
- Emma's forest lizard, Calotes emma
- Giessler's forest lizard, Calotes geissleri
- Large-scaled forest lizard, Calotes grandisquamis (E)
- Irrawady forest lizard, Calotes irawadi
- Yunnan forest lizard, Calotes jerdoni
- Maria's forest lizard, Calotes maria (E)
- Medong bloodsucker, Calotes medogensis
- Hardwicke's bloodsucker, Calotes minor
- Blue-crested lizard, Calotes mystaceus
- Nilgiri forest lizard, Calotes nemoricola
- Small forest lizard, Calotes paulus (E)
- Subansiri forest lizard, Calotes sinyik (E)
- Indian garden lizard, Calotes versicolor
- Eastern garden lizard, Calotes vultuosus
- Mizoram montane forest lizard, Calotes zolaiking (E)
- Short-tailed bay island forest lizard, Coryphophylax brevicauda (E)
- Camorta bay island forest lizard, Coryphophylax krishnani (E)
- Maximilian's bay island forest lizard, Coryphophylax maximiliani (E)
- Short-crested bay island forest lizard, Coryphophylax subcristatus (E)
- Ota's mountain lizard, Cristidorsa otai
- Smooth-scaled mountain lizard, Cristidorsa planidorsata
- Blandford's flying lizard, Draco blanfordii
- Western Ghats flying lizard, Draco dussumieri (E)
- Spotted flying lizard, Draco maculatus
- Norville's flying lizard, Draco norvillii
- Anderson's mountain lizard, Japalura andersoniana
- Abor hills agama, Japalura austeniana
- Kumaon mountain lizard, Japalura kumaonensis
- Large mountain lizard, Japalura major (E)
- Mixed-scale mountain lizard, Japalura mictophola (E)
- Burmese japalure, Japalura sagittifera
- Three-keeled mountain lizard, Japalura tricarinata
- Variegated mountain lizard, Japalura variegata
- Agror agama, Laudakia agrorensis
- Haridwar agama, Laudakia dayana (E)
- Papenfuss' rock agama, Laudakia papenfussi
- Kashmir rock agama, Laudakia tuberculata
- Orange-lipped forest lizard, Microauris aurantolabium (E)
- Spiny-headed lizard, Monilesaurus acanthocephalus (E)
- Elliot's forest lizard, Monilesaurus ellioti (E)
- Montane forest lizard, Monilesaurus montanus (E)
- Roux's forest lizard, Monilesaurus rouxii (E)
- Himalayan agama, Paralaudakia himalayana
- Reticulated toad-headed agama, Phrynocephalus reticulatus
- Theobald's toad-headed agama, Phrynocephalus theobaldi
- Blanford's rock agama, Psammophilus blanfordanus (E)
- Peninsular rock agama, Psammophilus dorsalis (E)
- Andaman canopy agama, Pseudocalotes andamanensis (E)
- Green fan-throated lizard, Ptyctolaemus gularis
- Namdapha fan-throated lizard, Ptyctolaemus namdaphaensis (E)
- Siang fan-throated lizard, Ptyctolaemus siangensis
- Hardwick's spiny-tailed lizard, Saara hardwickii
- Anaimalai spiny lizard, Salea anamallayana (E)
- Horsfield's spiny lizard, Salea horsfieldii (E)
- Darwin's large fan-throated lizard, Sarada darwini (E)
- Deccan fan-throated lizard, Sarada deccanensis (E)
- Superb large fan-throated lizard, Sarada superba (E)
- Devaka's fan-throated lizard, Sitana devakai
- Dharwar fan-throated lizard, Sitana dharwarensis (E)
- Dark sitana, Sitana fusca
- Gokak fan-throated lizard, Sitana gokakensis (E)
- Kalesar fan-throated lizard, Sitana kalesari (E)
- Broad-headed fan-throated lizard, Sitana laticeps (E)
- Serrated fan-throated lizard, Sitana marudhamneydhal (E)
- Pondicherry fan-throated lizard, Sitana ponticeriana
- Schleich's fan-throated lizard, Sitana schleichi
- Siwalik sitana, Sitana sivalensis
- Spiny-headed fan-throated lizard, Sitana spinaecephalus (E)
- Sushil's fan-throated lizard, Sitana sushili (E)
- Najarjuna Sagar fan-throated lizard, Sitana thondalu (E)
- Palmleaf fan-throated lizard, Sitana visiri (E)
- Brilliant ground agama, Trapelus agilis

=== Family Scincidae ===
- Flame snake-eyed skink, Ablepharus flammeus (E)
- Minor snake-eyed skink, Ablepharus grayanus
- Himalayan ground skink, Ablepharus himalayanus
- Ladakh ground skink, Ablepharus ladacensis
- Asian snake-eyed skink, Ablepharus pannonicus
- Sikkim ground skink, Ablepharus sikimmensis
- Tragbul ground skink, Ablepharus tragbulensis
- Madras spotted skink, Barkudia insularis (E)
- Vishakapatnam legless skink, Barkudia melanosticta (E)
- Five-toed cylindrical skink, Chalcides pentadactylus (E)
- Barred tree skink, Dasia johnsinghi (E)
- Nicobar tree skink, Dasia nicobarensis (E)
- Olive tree skink, Dasia olivacea
- Boulenger's tree skink, Dasia subcaerulea (E)
- Gingee leaf-litter skink, Dravidoseps gingeeensis (E)
- Goan leaf-litter skink, Dravidoseps goaensis (E)
- Jawadhu leaf-litter skink, Dravidoseps jawadhuensis (E)
- Kalkkad leaf-litter skink, Dravidoseps kalakadensis (E)
- Nilgiri gracile skink, Dravidoseps nilgiriensis (E)
- Pruthi's leaf-litter skink, Dravidoseps pruthi (E)
- Srivilliputhur leaf-litter skink, Dravidoseps srivilliputhurensis (E)
- Tamil Nadu leaf-litter skink, Dravidoseps tamilnaduensis (E)
- Poona skink, Eurylepis poonaensis (E)
- Alpine Punjab skink, Eurylepis taeniolata
- Allapalli grass skink, Eutropis allapallensis (E)
- Andaman grass skink, Eutropis andamanensis (E)
- Ashwamedh's writhing skink, Eutropis ashwamedhi (E)
- Beddome's mabuya, Eutropis beddomei
- Bibron's skink, Eutropis bibronii
- Günther's grass skink, Eutropis brevis (E)
- Keeled Indian mabuya, Eutropis carinata
- Inger's mabuya, Eutropis clivicola (E)
- Nicobar sun skink, Eutropis dattaroyi (E)
- Tamil Nadu mabuya, Eutropis dawsoni (E)
- Blanford's mabuya, Eutropis innotata (E)
- Bronze mabuya, Eutropis macularia
- Common sun skink, Eutropis multifasciata
- Sharma's mabuya, Eutropis nagarjuni (E)
- Beautiful mabuya, Eutropis quadricarinata
- Rough mabuya, Eutropis rudis
- Rough-scaled sun skink, Eutropis rugifera
- Three-banded mabuya, Eutropis trivittata
- Tytler's mabuya, Eutropis tytleri (E)
- Lined mabuya, Eutropis vertebralis (E)
- Beddome's ground skink, Kaestlea beddomii (E)
- Two-lined ground skink, Kaestlea bilineata (E)
- Side-spotted skink, Kaestlea laterimaculata (E)
- Palni ground skink, Kaestlea palnica (E)
- Travancore ground skink, Kaestlea travancorica (E)
- Common lanka skink, Lankascincus fallax
- Big-eared lipinia, Lipinia macrotympanum (E)
- Eastern snake skink, Ophiomorus raithmai
- Apatani skink, Protoblepharus apatani (E)
- White-spotted supple skink, Riopa albopunctata
- Deccan gracile skink, Riopa deccanensis (E)
- Günther's writhing skink, Riopa guentheri (E)
- Lined supple skink, Riopa lineata (E)
- Common dotted garden skink, Riopa punctata
- Vosmer's writhing skink, Riopa vosmaerii (E)
- Beddome's cat skink, Ristella beddomii (E)
- Günther's ristella, Ristella guentheri (E)
- Rurk's ristella, Ristella rurkii (E)
- Travancore ristella, Ristella travancorica (E)
- Large-eared ground skink, Scincella macrotis (E)
- Reeves' smooth skink, Scincella reevesii
- Spotted Eastern Ghats skink, Sepsophis punctatus (E)
- Eyelid-lacking forest skink, Sphenomorphus apalpebratus (E)
- Medog skink, Sphenomorphus courcyanus
- Dussumier's forest skink, Sphenomorphus dussumieri (E)
- Indian forest skink, Sphenomorphus indicus
- Spotted forest skink, Sphenomorphus maculatus
- Bowring's supple skink, Subdoluseps bowringii
- North-eastern water skink, Tropidophorus assamensis

=== Family Anguidae ===
- Asian glass lizard, Dopasia gracilis

=== Family Dibamidae ===
- Nicobar worm lizard, Dibamus nicobaricum (E)

=== Family Varanidae ===
- Bengal monitor, Varanus bengalensis
- Yellow monitor, Varanus flavescens
- Desert monitor, Varanus griseus
- Asian water monitor, Varanus salvator

=== Family Chamaeleonidae ===
- Indian chameleon, Chamaeleo zeylanicus

=== Family Lacertidae ===
- Indian fringe-fingered lizard, Acanthodactylus cantoris
- Bishnoi sand lizard, Mesalina bishnoi (E)
- Agarwal's lacerta, Ophisops agarwali (E)
- Beddome's lacerta, Ophisops beddomei (E)
- Snake-eyed lacerta, Ophisops jerdonii
- Kutch small-scaled snake-eye, Ophisops kutchensis (E)
- Leschenault's snake-eye, Ophisops leschenaultii
- Small-scaled lacerta, Ophisops microlepis
- Lesser snake-eye, Ophisops nictans
- Pushkar small-scaled snake-eye, Ophisops pushkarensis (E)
- Beautiful lacerta, Ophisops venustus (E)
- Haughton's long-tailed lizard, Takydromus haughtonianus (E)
- Khasi Hills long-tailed lizard, Takydromus khasiensis
- Asian grass lizard, Takydromus sexlineatus
- Sikkim grass lizard, Takydromus sikkimensis
- Ultapan grass lizard, Takydromus ultapaniensis (E)

=== Family Acrochordidae ===
- Little file snake, Acrochordus granulatus

=== Family Uropeltidae ===
- Two-lined black earth snake, Melanophidium bilineatum (E)
- Khaire's earth snake, Melanophidium khairei (E)
- Beddome's black earth snake, Melanophidium punctatum (E)
- Indian black earth snake, Melanophidium wynaudense (E)
- Madurai shieldtail, Platyplectrurus madurensis (E)
- Three-lined shieldtail, Platyplectrurus trilineatus (E)
- Kerala burrowing snake, Plectrurus aureus (E)
- Günther's burrowing snake, Plectrurus guentheri (E)
- Nilgiri burrowing snake, Plectrurus perroteti (E)
- Karnataka burrowing snake, Pseudoplectrurus canaricus (E)
- Cardamom Hills earth snake, Rhinophis fergusonianus (E)
- Gower's shieldtail, Rhinophis goweri (E)
- Karinthandan's shieldtail, Rhinophis karinthandani (E)
- Black-and-white shieldtail, Rhinophis melanoleucus (E)
- Salty earth snake, Rhinophis sanguineus (E)
- Siruvani shieldtail, Rhinophis siruvaniensis (E)
- Tamil Nadu earth snake, Rhinophis travancoricus (E)
- Agumbe earth snake, Teretrurus agumbensis (E)
- White-bellied earth snake, Teretrurus albiventer (E)
- Hewston's earth snake, Teretrurus hewstoni (E)
- Periyar earth snake, Teretrurus periyarensis (E)
- Palni Mountain burrowing snake, Teretrurus rhodogaster (E)
- Purple-red earth snake, Teretrurus sanguineus (E)
- Siruvani Hills earth snake, Teretrurus siruvaniensis (E)
- Travancore earth snake, Teretrurus travancoricus (E)
- Tirunelveli earth snake, Uropeltis arcticeps (E)
- Beddome's earth snake, Uropeltis beddomii (E)
- Bhupathy's shieldtail, Uropeltis bhupathyi (E)
- Bicatenate shieldtail, Uropeltis bicatenata (E)
- Brougham's earth snake, Uropeltis broughami (E)
- Tailspot shieldtail, Uropeltis caudomaculata (E)
- Kerala shieldtail, Uropeltis ceylanica (E)
- Sirumalai Hills earth snake, Uropeltis dindigalensis (E)
- Elliot's earth snake, Uropeltis ellioti (E)
- Smith's earth snake, Uropeltis grandis (E)
- Madura shieldtail, Uropeltis guentheri (E)
- Jerdon's shieldtail, Uropeltis jerdoni (E)
- Günther's earth snake, Uropeltis liura (E)
- Bombay earth snake, Uropeltis macrolepis (E)
- Anamally earth snake, Uropeltis macrorhyncha (E)
- Spotted earth snake, Uropeltis maculata (E)
- Madura earth snake, Uropeltis madurensis (E)
- Boulenger's earth snake, Uropeltis myhendrae (E)
- Southern earth snake, Uropeltis nitida (E)
- Ocellated shieldtail, Uropeltis ocellata (E)
- Sheildtail earth snake, Uropeltis petersi (E)
- Phipson's shieldtail, Uropeltis phipsonii (E)
- Rajendran's shieldtail, Uropeltis rajendrani (E)
- Red-lined earth snake, Uropeltis rubrolineata (E)
- Red-spotted earth snake, Uropeltis rubromaculata (E)
- Shevaroy Hills earth snake, Uropeltis shorttii (E)
- Three-cusped uropeltis, Uropeltis tricuspida (E)
- Woodmason's earth snake, Uropeltis woodmasoni (E)

=== Family Pythonidae ===
- Reticulated python, Malayopython reticulatus
- Burmese python, Python bivittatus
- Indian python, Python molurus

=== Family Xenopeltidae ===
- Sunbeam snake, Xenopeltis unicolor

=== Family Boidae ===
- Common sand boa, Eryx conicus
- Indian sand boa, Eryx johnii
- Sistan sand boa, Eryx sistanensis
- Whitaker's sand boa, Eryx whitakeri (E)

=== Family Psammophiidae ===
- Oriental sand snake, Psammophis condanarus
- Pakistani ribbon snake, Psammophis leithii
- Long sand racer, Psammophis longifrons (E)
- Schokari sand racer, Psammophis schokari

=== Family Colubridae ===
- Variable-colored vine snake, Ahaetulla anomala
- Northern Western Ghats vine snake, Ahaetulla borealis (E)
- Günther's vine snake, Ahaetulla dispar (E)
- Farnsworth's vine snake, Ahaetulla farnsworthi (E)
- Yellow whip snake, Ahaetulla flavescens (E)
- Wall's vine snake, Ahaetulla isabellina (E)
- Laudankia vine snake, Ahaetulla laudankia
- Long-snouted vine snake, Ahaetulla longirostris (E)
- Malabar vine snake, Ahaetulla malabarica (E)
- Indian vine snake, Ahaetulla oxyrhynca (E)
- Western Ghats bronzeback, Ahaetulla perroteti (E)
- Sahyadri Hills whipsnake, Ahaetulla sahyadrensis (E)
- Travancore vine snake, Ahaetulla travancorica (E)
- Wynad keelback, Amphiesma monticola (E)
- Buff striped keelback, Amphiesma stolatum
- DiCaprio's Himalayan snake, Anguiculus dicaprioi (E)
- Rapp's Himalayan snake, Anguiculus rappii
- Bella rat snake, Archelaphe bella
- Split keelback, Atretium schistosum
- Andaman cat snake, Boiga andamanensis (E)
- Beddome's cat snake, Boiga beddomei (E)
- Green cat snake, Boiga cyanea
- Pirmad cat snake, Boiga dightoni (E)
- Yellow-green cat snake, Boiga flaviviridis (E)
- Forsten's cat snake, Boiga forsteni
- Arrowback tree snake, Boiga gocool
- Many-banded tree snake, Boiga multifasciata
- Many-spotted cat snake, Boiga multomaculata
- Collared cat snake, Boiga nuchalis (E)
- Assamese cat snake, Boiga quincunciata
- Eyed cat snake, Boiga siamensis
- Stoliczka's Asian cat snake, Boiga stoliczkae
- Thackeray's cat snake, Boiga thackerayi (E)
- Common cat snake, Boiga trigonata
- Nicobar cat snake, Boiga wallachi (E)
- Indian egg-eating snake, Boiga westermanni
- Garo Hills reed snake, Calamaria garoensis (E)
- Mizoram reed snake, Calamaria mizoramensis (E)
- Collared reed snake, Calamaria pavimentata
- Ornate flying snake, Chrysopelea ornata
- Paradise flying snake, Chrysopelea paradisi
- Sri Lankan flying snake, Chrysopelea taprobanica
- Black copper rat snake, Coelognathus flavolineatus
- Trinket snake, Coelognathus helena
- Radiated rat snake, Coelognathus radiatus
- Andaman bronzeback, Dendrelaphis andamanensis (E)
- Ashok's bronzeback, Dendrelaphis ashoki (E)
- Beddome's bronzeback, Dendrelaphis beddomei (E)
- Boulenger's bronzeback, Dendrelaphis bifrenalis
- Gore's bronzeback, Dendrelaphis biloreatus
- Western Ghats bronzeback, Dendrelaphis chairecacos (E)
- Blue bronzeback, Dendrelaphis cyanochloris
- Giri's bronzeback, Dendrelaphis girii (E)
- Large-eyed bronzeback, Dendrelaphis grandoculis (E)
- Nicobar bronzeback, Dendrelaphis humayuni (E)
- Eastern bronzeback, Dendrelaphis proarchos
- Common bronzeback, Dendrelaphis tristis
- Banded wolf snake, Dinodon fasciatus
- White-banded wolf snake, Dinodon septentrionalis
- Eastern trinket snake, Elaphe cantoris
- Himalayan trinket, Elaphe hodgsonii
- Beauty rat snake, Elaphe taeniura
- Mandarin rat snake, Euprepiophis mandarinus
- Checkered keelback, Fowlea piscator
- St. John's keelback, Fowlea sanctijohannis
- Bar-necked keelback, Fowlea schnurrenbergeri
- Andaman keelback, Fowlea tytleri (E)
- Calamaria reed snake, Gongylosoma calamaria
- Günther's reed snake, Gongylosoma frenata
- Nicobar reed snake, Gongylosoma nicobariensis (E)
- Common ring-neck, Gongylosoma scriptum
- Khasi Hills trinket snake, Gonyosoma frenatum
- Red-tailed green rat snake, Gonyosoma oxycephalum
- Green bush rat snake, Gonyosoma prasinum
- Yunnan keelback, Hebius clerki
- Kachin keelback, Hebius gilhodesi
- Khasi keelback, Hebius khasiensis
- Crying keelback, Hebius lacrima
- Modest keelback, Hebius modestus
- Parallel Yunnan keelback, Hebius parallelus
- Taron keelback, Hebius taronensis
- Chin Hills keelback, Hebius venningi
- Rakhine keelback, Herpetoreas davidi
- Murlen keelback, Herpetoreas murlen (E)
- Assam keelback, Herpetoreas pealii
- Himalayan keelback, Herpetoreas platyceps
- Sikkim keelback, Herpetoreas sieboldii
- Wall's keelback, Herpetoreas xenura
- Stoliczka's reed snake, Liopeltis stoliczkae
- Indian wolf snake, Lycodon aulicus
- Mackinnon's wolf snake, Lycodon bicolor
- Deccan wolf snake, Lycodon deccanensis (E)
- Russell's wolf snake, Lycodon fasciolatus
- Yellow-collared wolf snake, Lycodon flavicollis (E)
- Yellow-spotted wolf snake, Lycodon flavomaculatus (E)
- Gammie's wolf snake, Lycodon gammiei
- Scarce bridle snake, Lycodon gracilis
- Andaman wolf snake, Lycodon hypsirhinoides (E)
- Irwin's wolf snake, Lycodon irwini (E)
- Yellow-speckled wolf snake, Lycodon jara
- Laotian wolf snake, Lycodon laoensis
- Vellore bridal snake, Lycodon nympha
- Barred wolf snake, Lycodon striatus
- Tiwari's wolf snake, Lycodon tiwarii (E)
- Travancore wolf snake, Lycodon travancoricus (E)
- Zaw's wolf snake, Lycodon zawi
- Sindh longnose sand snake, Lytorhynchus paradoxus
- Western kukri snake, Oligodon affinis (E)
- Light-barred kukri snake, Oligodon albocinctus
- Banded kukri snake, Oligodon arnensis
- Shorthead kukri snake, Oligodon brevicauda (E)
- Assam kukri snake, Oligodon catenatus
- Black cross-barred kukri snake, Oligodon cinereus
- Cantor's kukri snake, Oligodon cyclurus
- Bengalese kukri snake, Oligodon dorsalis
- Nagarkot kukri snake, Oligodon erythrogaster
- Namsang kukri snake, Oligodon erythrorhachis (E)
- Walnut kukri snake, Oligodon juglandifer
- Coral-red kukri snake, Oligodon kheriensis
- Blueberry kukri snake, Oligodon melaneus (E)
- Abor hills kukri snake, Oligodon melanozonatus
- Nikhil's kukri snake, Oligodon nikhili (E)
- Russell's kukri snake, Oligodon russelius
- Streaked kukri snake, Oligodon taeniolatus
- Theobald's kukri snake, Oligodon theobaldi
- Tillack's kukri snake, Oligodon tillacki (E)
- Travancore kukri snake, Oligodon travancoricus (E)
- Jerdon's kukri snake, Oligodon venustus (E)
- Andaman black kukri snake, Oligodon woodmasoni (E)
- Red mountain rat snake, Oreocryptophis porphyraceus
- Sharma's racer, Platyceps bholanathi (E)
- Graceful racer, Platyceps gracilis (E)
- Joseph's racer, Platyceps josephi (E)
- Banded racer, Platyceps plinii
- Jan's cliff racer, Platyceps rhodorachis
- Hardwicke's rat snake, Platyceps ventromaculatus
- Stripe-tailed racer, Platyceps vittacaudatus (E)
- Keeled vine snake, Proahaetulla antiqua (E)
- Big-eyed bamboo snake, Pseudoxenodon macrops
- Doria's green snake, Ptyas doriae
- Indochinese rat snake, Ptyas korros
- Oriental rat snake, Ptyas mucosa
- Green rat snake, Ptyas nigromarginata
- Bindee keelback, Rhabdophis bindi
- Heller's red-necked keelback, Rhabdophis helleri
- Orange-collared keelback, Rhabdophis himalayanus
- Leonard's keelback, Rhabdophis leonardi
- Hubei keelback, Rhabdophis nuchalis
- Green keelback, Rhabdophis plumbicolor
- Water rhabdops, Rhabdops aquaticus (E)
- Olive trapezoid snake, Rhabdops olivaceus (E)
- Nilgiri keelback, Sahyadriophis beddomei (E)
- Northern Sahyadri keelback, Sahyadriophis uttaraghati (E)
- Günther's many-tooth snake, Sibynophis bistrigatus
- Collared black-headed snake, Sibynophis collaris
- Cantor's black-headed snake, Sibynophis sagittarius
- Black-headed snake, Sibynophis subpunctatus
- Arunachal rain snake, Smithophis arunachalensis (E)
- Mizo rain snake, Smithophis atemporalis
- Brown trapezoid snake, Smithophis bicolor
- Narrow-banded rain snake, Smithophis leptofasciatus (E)
- Mizoram trapezoid snake, Smithophis mizoramensis (E)
- Red-spotted royal snake, Spalerosophis arenarius
- Royal snake, Spalerosophis atriceps
- Diadem snake, Spalerosophis diadema
- Apte's worm-eating snake, Trachischium apteii (E)
- Blackbelly worm-eating snake, Trachischium fuscum
- Günther's worm-eating snake, Trachischium guentheri
- Mizoram ground snake, Trachischium hmuifang (E)
- Olive Oriental slender snake, Trachischium laeve
- Lalremsanga's worm-eating snake, Trachischium lalremsangai
- Mountain worm-eating snake, Trachischium monticola
- Blyth's reticulated snake, Trachischium reticulata
- Sushanta's worm-eating snake, Trachischium sushantai (E)
- Yellow-bellied worm-eating snake, Trachischium tenuiceps
- Olive annulate keelback, Trimerodytes percarinatus
- Wallace's racer, Wallaceophis gujaratensis (E)
- Indian smooth snake, Wallophis brachyura (E)
- Painted keelback, Xenochrophis cerasogaster
- Triangle keelback, Xenochrophis trianguligerus

=== Family Elapidae ===
- Spine-tailed seasnake, Aipysurus eydouxii
- Andaman krait, Bungarus andamanensis (E)
- Northeastern hill krait, Bungarus bungaroides
- Common krait, Bungarus caeruleus
- Banded krait, Bungarus fasciatus
- Lesser black krait, Bungarus lividus
- Greater black krait, Bungarus niger
- Sind krait, Bungarus sindanus
- Suzhen's krait, Bungarus suzhenae
- Wall's krait, Bungarus walli
- Beddome's coral snake, Calliophis beddomei (E)
- Bibron's coral snake, Calliophis bibroni (E)
- Castoe's coral snake, Calliophis castoe (E)
- Indian coral snake, Calliophis melanurus
- Black coral snake, Calliophis nigrescens (E)
- Annandale's sea snake, Hydrophis annandalei
- Anomalous sea snake, Hydrophis anomalus
- Faint-banded sea snake, Hydrophis belcheri
- Peters' sea snake, Hydrophis bituberculatus
- Brooke's sea snake, Hydrophis brookii
- Dwarf seasnake, Hydrophis caerulescens
- Spine-bellied sea snake, Hydrophis curtus
- Annulated sea snake, Hydrophis cyanocinctus
- Striped sea snake, Hydrophis fasciatus
- Hardwicke's spine-bellied sea snake, Hydrophis hardwickii
- Inornate sea snake, Hydrophis inornatus
- Jerdon's sea snake, Hydrophis jerdonii
- Persian Gulf sea snake, Hydrophis lapemoides
- Olive-headed sea snake, Hydrophis major
- Bombay sea snake, Hydrophis mamillaris
- Slender-necked sea snake, Hydrophis melanocephalus
- Black-banded sea snake, Hydrophis nigrocinctus
- Russel's sea snake, Hydrophis obscurus
- Ornate reef snake, Hydrophis ornatus
- Yellow-bellied sea snake, Hydrophis platurus
- Beaked sea snake, Hydrophis schistosus
- Yellow sea snake, Hydrophis spiralis
- Stokes's sea snake, Hydrophis stokesii
- Collared sea snake, Hydrophis stricticollis
- Viperine sea snake, Hydrophis viperinus
- Yellow-lipped sea krait, Laticauda colubrina
- Dwarf sea krait, Laticauda frontalis
- Blue-lipped sea krait, Laticauda laticaudata
- Cantor's narrow-headed sea snake, Microcephalophis cantoris
- Narrow-headed sea snake, Microcephalophis gracilis
- Monocled cobra, Naja kaouthia
- Indian cobra, Naja naja
- Caspian cobra, Naja oxiana
- Andaman cobra, Naja sagittifera (E)
- King cobra, Ophiophagus hannah
- Western Ghats king cobra, Ophiophagus kaalinga (E)
- Gore's coral snake, Sinomicrurus gorei
- MacClelland's coral snake, Sinomicrurus macclellandi

=== Family Homalopsidae ===
- Cantor's water snake, Cantoria violacea
- Dog-faced water snake, Cerberus rynchops
- Kerala mud snake, Dieurostus dussumieri (E)
- Rainbow water snake, Enhydris enhydris
- Siebold's water snake, Ferania sieboldii
- Crab-eating water snake, Fordonia leucobalia
- Gerard's water snake, Gerarda prevostiana
- Linne's water snake, Homalopsis buccata
- Hardwicke's water snake, Homalopsis hardwickii
- Boie's mud snake, Hypsiscopus plumbeus

=== Family Pareidae ===
- Anderson's slug snake, Pareas andersonii
- Kadur's slug snake, Pareas kaduri (E)
- Mountain slug snake, Pareas macularius
- Small slug snake, Pareas modestus
- Common slug snake, Pareas monticola
- Captain's wood snake, Xylophis captaini (E)
- Red-and-black wood snake, Xylophis chenkaruppan (E)
- Deepak's wood snake, Xylophis deepaki (E)
- Anamalai wood snake, Xylophis mosaicus (E)
- Perrotet's wood snake, Xylophis perroteti (E)
- Günther's wood snake, Xylophis stenorhynchus (E)

=== Family Psammodynastidae ===
- Common mock viper, Psammodynastes pulverulentus

=== Family Xenodermidae ===
- Khasi earth snake, Stoliczkia khasiensis (E)
- Lushai hills dragon snake, Stoliczkia vanhnuailianai (E)

=== Family Viperidae ===
- Anamalai pit viper, Craspedocephalus anamallensis (E)
- Common bamboo viper, Craspedocephalus gramineus (E)
- Large-scaled pit viper, Craspedocephalus macrolepis (E)
- Malabarian pit viper, Craspedocephalus malabaricus (E)
- Western bamboo pit viper, Craspedocephalus occidentalis (E)
- Southern large-scaled pit viper, Craspedocephalus peltopelor (E)
- Horseshoe pit viper, Craspedocephalus strigatus (E)
- Travancore pit viper, Craspedocephalus travancoricus (E)
- Russell's viper, Daboia russelii
- Saw-scaled viper, Echis carinatus
- Chamba pit viper, Gloydius chambensis (E)
- Himalayan pit viper, Gloydius himalayanus
- Hump-nosed viper, Hypnale hypnale
- Levantine viper, Macrovipera lebetinus
- Jenkins' mountain pit viper, Ovophis jenkinsi
- Chinese mountain pit viper, Ovophis monticola
- Zayuan pit viper, Ovophis zayuensis
- East Himalayan pit viper, Protobothrops himalayanus
- Jerdon's pit viper, Protobothrops jerdonii
- Kaulback's pit viper, Protobothrops kaulbacki
- Brown-spotted pit viper, Protobothrops mucrosquamatus
- Andaman pit viper, Trimeresurus andersonii (E)
- Arunachal pit viper, Trimeresurus arunachalensis (E)
- Cantor's pit viper, Trimeresurus cantori (E)
- Car Nicobar green pit viper, Trimeresurus davidi (E)
- Spot-tailed pit viper, Trimeresurus erythrurus
- Island pit viper, Trimeresurus labialis (E)
- Maya's pit viper, Trimeresurus mayaae (E)
- Medo pit viper, Trimeresurus medoensis
- Central Nicobar pit viper, Trimeresurus mutabilis (E)
- Pope's pit viper, Trimeresurus popeiorum
- Salazar's pit viper, Trimeresurus salazar
- Nepal pit viper, Trimeresurus septentrionalis
- Stejneger's pit viper, Trimeresurus stejnegeri
- Uetz's pit viper, Trimeresurus uetzi
- Yunnan bamboo pit viper, Trimeresurus yunnanensis
- Hutton's pit viper, Tropidolaemus huttoni (E)

=== Family Leptotyphlopidae ===
- Sindh thread snake, Myriopholis blanfordii
- Hook-snouted worm snake, Myriopholis macrorhyncha

=== Family Gerrhopilidae ===
- Andaman worm snake, Gerrhopilus andamanensis (E)
- Beddome's worm snake, Gerrhopilus beddomii (E)
- Few-scaled worm snake, Gerrhopilus oligolepis (E)
- Thurston's worm snake, Gerrhopilus thurstoni (E)
- Nilgiri worm snake, Gerrhopilus tindalli (E)

=== Family Typhlopidae ===
- Günther's blind snake, Argyrophis bothriorhynchus
- Diard's blind snake, Argyrophis diardii
- Andaman blind snake, Argyrophis oatesii
- Beaked blind snake, Grypotyphlops acutus (E)
- Brahminy blind snake, Indotyphlops braminus
- Fletcher's blind snake, Indotyphlops fletcheri (E)
- Jerdon's blind snake, Indotyphlops jerdoni
- Darjeeling blind snake, Indotyphlops meszoelyi (E)
- South India blind snake, Indotyphlops pammeces (E)
- Samagutin blind snake, Indotyphlops tenuicollis
- Belgaum worm snake, Pseudoindotyphlops exiguus (E)
- Slender worm snake, Pseudoindotyphlops porrectus
