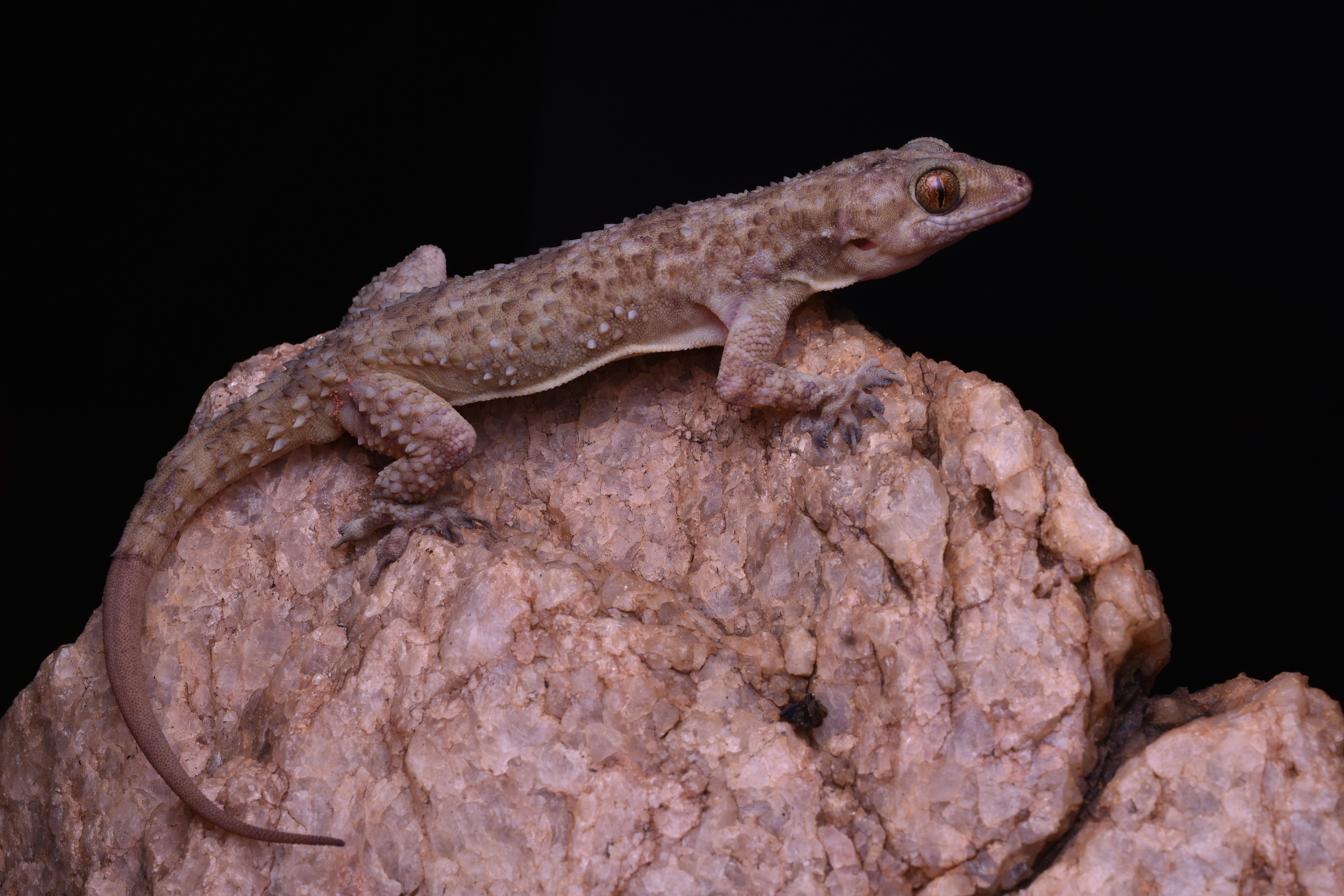
- Hemidactylus multisulcatus

Scientific classification
- Kingdom: Animalia
- Phylum: Chordata
- Class: Reptilia
- Order: Squamata
- Suborder: Gekkota
- Family: Gekkonidae
- Genus: Hemidactylus
- Species: H. multisulcatus

Binomial name
- Hemidactylus multisulcatus Sayyed et al., 2023

= Madurai rock gecko =

Species of rock-dwelling gecko

Madurai rock gecko (Hemidactylus multisulcatus, Tamil: மதுரைப் பாறைப்பல்லி) is a rock-dwelling gecko described in 2023 from Nagamalai near Madurai. It belongs to the same genus as house geckos and has distinct characteristics. Members of this genus are usually non-venomous and are harmless to humans. These geckos are nocturnal and prefer rocky areas.

== Appearance ==
The distinguishing characteristics of Madurai rock geckos are the number of dorsal tubercle rows at mid-body, the number of enlarged tubercles in paravertebral rows, the number of femoral pores and poreless scales separating the left and right series on the femoral-precloacal row in males, and the number of ventral scales across the belly at mid-body. These are medium-sized geckos with a recorded length of 84 mm. The dorsal side is grey in colour. There are four yellowish-brown circular blotches between the neck and the hind limbs. The head is dark brown. Tail has nine or 10 grey bands. The ventral side is whitish from head to hindlegs. The tail has yellowish bands on a grey background.

== Range ==
Madurai rock geckos have been recorded from only its type location in Nagamalai near Madurai. The species has been distinguished from Sirumalai rock gecko on the northern side, Meghamalai rock gecko on the west, Travancore rock gecko and Tirunelveli rock gecko on the south.
