= Smaug (disambiguation) =

Smaug is a dragon in J. R. R. Tolkien's novel The Hobbit.

Smaug may also refer to:

- Smaug (lizard), a genus of lizards
- Smaug (protein), an RNA-binding protein
- Cnemaspis smaug, a species of gecko
- Tetramorium smaug, a species of myrmicine ant
- SMAUG, a multi-user dungeon derived from DikuMUD

== See also ==
- Smog (disambiguation)
