= Cyrtodactylus himalayicus =

Scientific classification
- Kingdom: Animalia
- Phylum: Chordata
- Class: Reptilia
- Order: Squamata
- Suborder: Gekkota
- Family: Gekkonidae
- Genus: Cyrtodactylus
- Species: C. himalayicus

Binomial name
- Cyrtodactylus himalayicus (Annandale, 1906)

Species of lizard

Cyrtodactylus himalayicus, also known as the Himalaya bent-toed gecko, is a species of gecko endemic to India. It is sometimes considered conspecific with the Khasi Hills bent-toed gecko.
