= Smog (disambiguation) =

Smog is a form of air pollution.

Smog or SMOG may also refer to:

- SMOG, a measure of readability
- SMOG (literary group), an informal group of young Soviet poets
- Smog (band), a moniker used by musician Bill Callahan
- Smog (film), a 1962 film by Franco Rossi
- Smog (1973 film), a 1973 TV film by Wolfgang Petersen
- SMOG, a fictional organization (Scientific Measurement Of Ghosts) in "The Living Dead" episode of The Avengers (TV series)
- Smog (1/3), a sculpture by Tony Smith
- Theatrical smog, a special effect

== See also ==
- Smaug (disambiguation)
