= Cnemaspis flavigularis =

Scientific classification
- Kingdom: Animalia
- Phylum: Chordata
- Class: Reptilia
- Order: Squamata
- Suborder: Gekkota
- Family: Gekkonidae
- Genus: Cnemaspis
- Species: C. flavigularis

Binomial name
- Cnemaspis flavigularis Pal, Mirza, Dsouza, & Shanker, 2021

Species of lizard

Cnemaspis flavigularis is a species of gecko. It is endemic to the Cardamom Hills, a part of the southern Western Ghats in Kerala, India. It belongs to the Cnemaspis littoralis group of species. Common name yellow throated day gecko has been coined for it.

== Description ==
Cnemaspis flavigularis is a small Cnemaspis, reaching 33 mm (1.3 in) in snout–vent length.

== Habitat ==
It is diurnal species that has been encountered from tree trunks and rocks inside evergreen forests at elevations above 1,300 m (4,300 ft) above sea level.
