= Cnemaspis cavernicola =

Scientific classification
- Kingdom: Animalia
- Phylum: Chordata
- Class: Reptilia
- Order: Squamata
- Suborder: Gekkota
- Family: Gekkonidae
- Genus: Cnemaspis
- Species: C. cavernicola

Binomial name
- Cnemaspis cavernicola Khandekar, Thackeray, Kalaimani & Agarwal, 2023

Species of reptile

Cnemaspis cavernicola, the cave-dwelling dwarf gecko, is a species of dwarf gecko that was found in Pakkamalai Reserve Forest in Tamil Nadu, India. It is a small species, with snout–vent length of 28–34 mm (1.1–1.3 in) and tail length of 24–36 mm (0.94–1.42 in), giving a maximum total length of about 68 mm (2.7 in).

== Description ==
Cnemaspis cavernicola is a small Cnemaspis, with a snout–vent length of less than 34 mm. The arrangement of scales on the dorsum is heterogeneous, with weakly keeled, granular scales in the vertebral and paravertebral regions, intermixed with about two or three regularly arranged rows of large, weakly keeled tubercles on each side of flank. The tubercles in lowest row are the largest and spine-like. There are 4–6 rows of dorsal tubercles. The ventral scales are smooth, subcircular, and subimbricate, with 28–32 scales across the belly and 116–125 longitudinal scales from the mental scale to the cloaca.

The subdigital scansors are smooth, entire, and unnotched, with 10–12 total lamellae under digit I of manus and pes,15–19 lamellae under digit IV of manus, and 18–21 lamellae under digit IV of pes. Males have one or two femoral pores on each thigh, separated on either side by 8–10 poreless scales from a continuous series of three precloacal pores. The tail has enlarged, strongly keeled, distinctly pointed, conical tubercles forming whorls and a median row of smooth, distinctly enlarged subcaudals. The dorsum is grey-brown with a single medial dark spot on nape, followed by four light blotches from forelimb insertions to tail base. The tail has 12–14 alternating light and dark bars.

== Distribution and habitat ==
Cnemaspis cavernicola is known only from Pakkamalai Reserve Forest in the Gingee Hills in Viluppuram district, Tamil Nadu at elevations of around 400–480 m. Individuals were observed in small numbers in shaded and relatively cool areas among very large granite boulders.
