= Cnemaspis pakkamalaiensis =

Scientific classification
- Kingdom: Animalia
- Phylum: Chordata
- Class: Reptilia
- Order: Squamata
- Suborder: Gekkota
- Family: Gekkonidae
- Genus: Cnemaspis
- Species: C. pakkamalaiensis

Binomial name
- Cnemaspis pakkamalaiensis Khandekar, Thackeray, Kalaimani & Agarwal, 2023

Species of reptile

Cnemaspis pakkamalaiensis, commonly known as the Pakkamalai dwarf gecko, is a species of dwarf gecko found in Pakkamalai Reserve Forest in Tamil Nadu, India. It is 6.4 cm (2.5 in) in length.

== Etymology ==
The species was named for the Pakkamalai Reserve Forest, in which it was first discovered.

== Description ==
The body is a straw brown colour, with chain link patterns running down its back and spikes alongside the body.
