= Hemidactylus tamhiniensis =

Scientific classification
- Kingdom: Animalia
- Phylum: Chordata
- Class: Reptilia
- Order: Squamata
- Suborder: Gekkota
- Family: Gekkonidae
- Genus: Hemidactylus
- Species: H. tamhiniensis

Binomial name
- Hemidactylus tamhiniensis Khandekar, Thackeray, & Agarwal, 2021

Species of lizard

Hemidactylus tamhiniensis, the Tamhini giant rock gecko or basalt giant rock gecko, is a species of gecko. It is endemic to India.
