= Cnemaspis assamensis =

Conservation status
- Vulnerable (IUCN 3.1)

Scientific classification
- Kingdom: Animalia
- Phylum: Chordata
- Class: Reptilia
- Order: Squamata
- Suborder: Gekkota
- Family: Gekkonidae
- Genus: Cnemaspis
- Species: C. assamensis

Binomial name
- Cnemaspis assamensis Das & Sengupta, 2000

Species of lizard

Cnemaspis assamensis, also known as the Assam day gecko, is a species of gecko found in Assam, India.
