= Cyrtodactylus himachalensis =

Scientific classification
- Kingdom: Animalia
- Phylum: Chordata
- Class: Reptilia
- Order: Squamata
- Suborder: Gekkota
- Family: Gekkonidae
- Genus: Cyrtodactylus
- Species: C. himachalensis

Binomial name
- Cyrtodactylus himachalensis Bhardwaj, Purkyastha, Lalremsanga, & Mirza, 2025

Species of gecko

Cyrtodactylus himachalensis is a species of gecko. The holotype was recovered from Khanyara (Kangra District) of the Indian state of Himachal Pradesh.

== Description ==
Cyrtodactylus himachalensis is a medium sized gecko, with a snout-vent length of 4.2 to 5.7 cm (1.7 to 2.2 in).

=== Sexual dimorphism ===
As in most species of Cyrtodactylus, sexual dimorphism is exhibited, mainly in how the males have 6 to 8 precloacal pores, arranged as 3 to 4 on each side, whereas in Females, this structure is completely absent. Females also tend to have larger bodies, along slightly larger head widths and heights, while males tend to have slightly more slender limbs.

== Distribution ==
Though the holotype was recovered from Khanyara, some DNA sequences matched earlier samples collected in Aut, Mandi.
