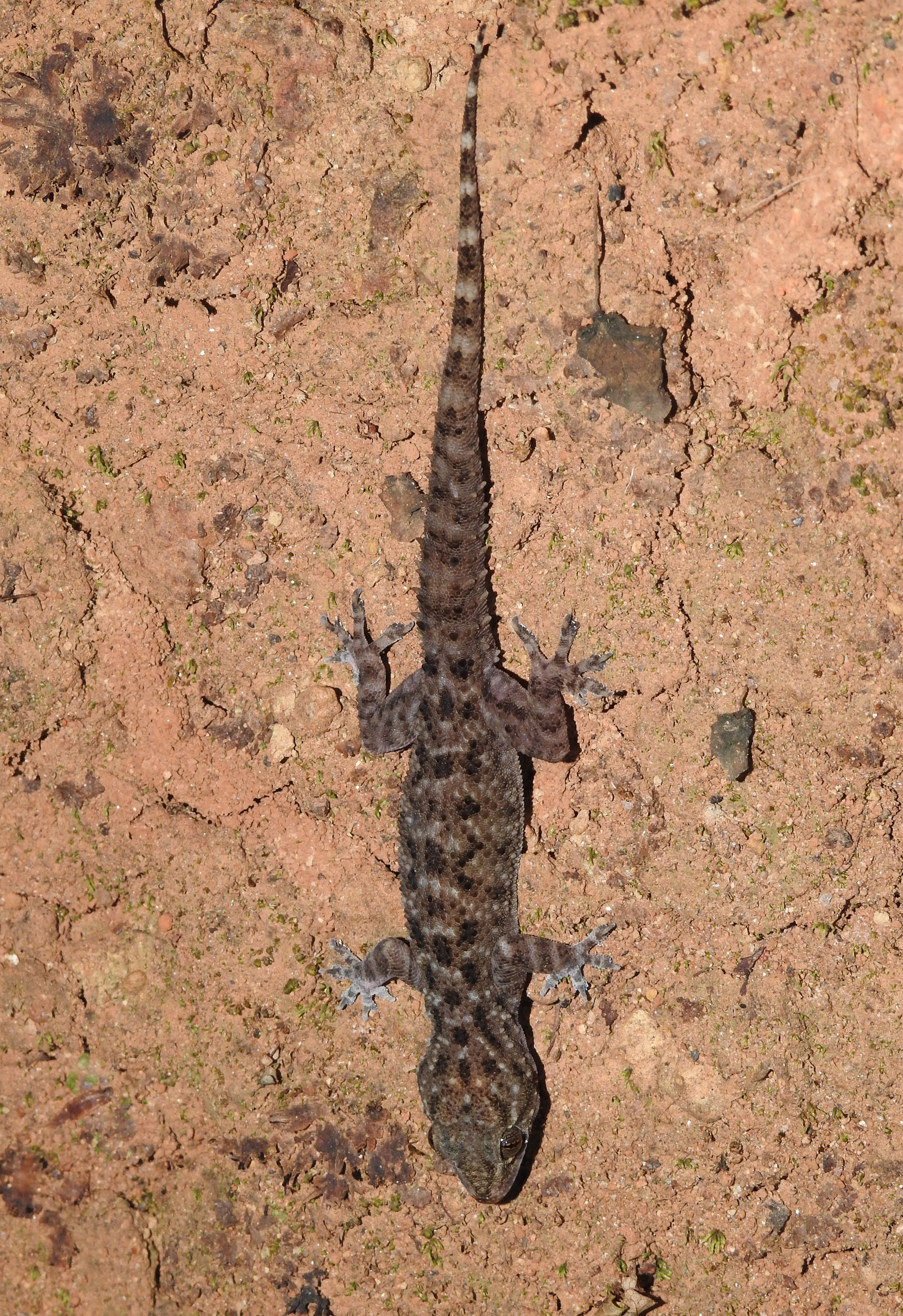

Scientific classification
- Kingdom: Animalia
- Phylum: Chordata
- Class: Reptilia
- Order: Squamata
- Suborder: Gekkota
- Family: Gekkonidae
- Genus: Hemidactylus
- Species: H. varadgirii

Binomial name
- Hemidactylus varadgirii Chaitanya, Agarwal, Lajmi & Khandekar, 2019

= Hemidactylus varadgirii =

Species of lizard

Hemidactylus varadgirii, also commonly known as Giri's brookiish gecko and the Amboli brookiish gecko, is a species of lizard in the family Gekkonidae. The species is endemic to India. It was discovered by herpetologist Varad Giri in the Indian village of Amboli, and was named in his honour.

== Taxonomy ==
H. varadgirii belongs to the H. brookii species group, to which the adjective "brookiish" in the common names refers.
