= Rishi Valley geckoella =

Scientific classification
- Kingdom: Animalia
- Phylum: Chordata
- Class: Reptilia
- Order: Squamata
- Suborder: Gekkota
- Family: Gekkonidae
- Genus: Cyrtodactylus
- Species: C. rishivalleyensis

Binomial name
- Cyrtodactylus rishivalleyensis Agarwal, 2016

Species of lizard

The Rishi Valley geckoella (Cyrtodactylus rishivalleyensis) is a species of nocturnal, terrestrial, insectivorous gecko that is endemic to India. This recently described species is named after the Rishi Valley School, and this is currently known from hills of the Eastern Ghats, in Chittoor district of Andhra Pradesh state.
