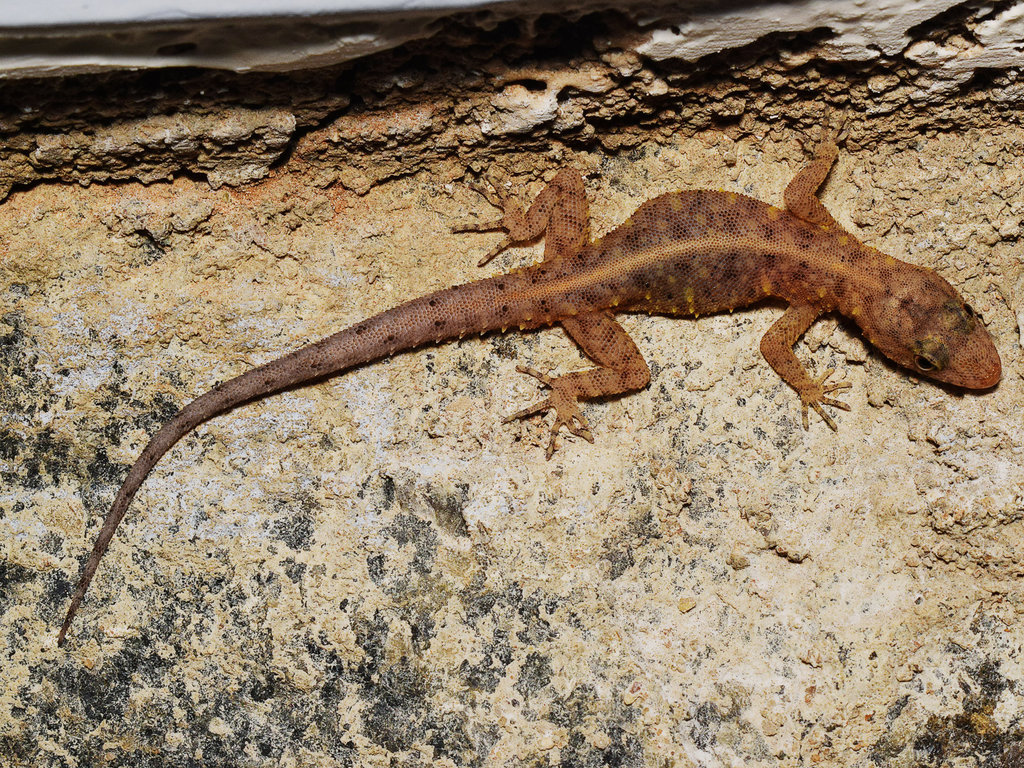

Conservation status
- Endangered (IUCN 3.1)

Scientific classification
- Kingdom: Animalia
- Phylum: Chordata
- Class: Reptilia
- Order: Squamata
- Suborder: Gekkota
- Family: Gekkonidae
- Genus: Cnemaspis
- Species: C. yercaudensis

Binomial name
- Cnemaspis yercaudensis Das & Bauer, 2000

= Yercaud day gecko =

Species of lizard

The Yercaud day gecko (Cnemaspis yercaudensis) is a species of gecko found in the Shevaroy Hills of southern India.

Its type locality is Yercaud Town (11°48'N; 78°14'E), in the Shevaroyan (Shevaroy) Range, Salem District, Tamil Nadu, southwest India, with its habitat located at 1,515 m (4,970 ft) above sea level.
