= Cnemaspis sathuragiriensis =

- A: adult male (holotype, NRC-AA-8349) B: subadult female (paratype, NRC-AA-8353), C: juvenile (uncollected)

Scientific classification
- Kingdom: Animalia
- Phylum: Chordata
- Class: Reptilia
- Order: Squamata
- Suborder: Gekkota
- Family: Gekkonidae
- Genus: Cnemaspis
- Species: C. sathuragiriensis

Binomial name
- Cnemaspis sathuragiriensis Khandekar et al., 2024

Species of gecko from India

Cnemaspis sathuragiriensis is a species of gecko in the family Gekkonidae. It was described in 2024 by indian herpetologists Akshay Khandekar, Tejas Thackeray and Ishan Agarwal.

It is named after its type locality on Sathuragiri Mountain, and was discovered alongside C. vangoghi.

== Behavior ==
Its a diurnal species, more active around the morning and evening. They can be found above rocks and tree trunks.

== Distribution and habitat ==
The species is distributed in low elevation, around 250-400 meters above the sea level in dry forests of Srivilliputhur, India.

== Morphology ==
A small species, reaching up to 33 mm in body length (excluding the tail). Its back is covered with small smooth scales and rows of larger, pointed scales. There are 6-8 rows of these larger scales across the middle of the body.

The abdomen has 28-30 scales across its middle and 130-137 scales along its length. The toes and fingers have smooth scales underneath, with 11-13 beneath the first finger and 18-21 beneath the fourth. On the foot, the corresponding counts are 11-12 and 23-24.

Males have 7-8 pores in a row near the cloaca. The first third of the tail has eight rows of larger scales, while the rest lacks them. Scales along the underside of the tail are larger than the surrounding ones.

Males have an ochre-coloured back with black and white spots on the neck and throat. Their belly is off-white, their throat is dark, and their tail has no bands. Females and young individuals are brown, with a noticeable stripe along the middle of the back.
