= Hemidactylus hegdei =

Scientific classification
- Kingdom: Animalia
- Phylum: Chordata
- Class: Reptilia
- Order: Squamata
- Suborder: Gekkota
- Family: Gekkonidae
- Genus: Hemidactylus
- Species: H. hegdei

Binomial name
- Hemidactylus hegdei Pal & Mirza, 2022

Species of lizard

Hemidactylus hegdei is a species of gecko. It is endemic to India.
