= Anguiculus dicaprioi =

Scientific classification
- Kingdom: Animalia
- Phylum: Chordata
- Class: Reptilia
- Order: Squamata
- Suborder: Serpentes
- Family: Colubridae
- Genus: Anguiculus
- Species: A. dicaprioi

Binomial name
- Anguiculus dicaprioi Mirza et al., 2024

Species of snake

Anguiculus dicaprioi is a species of colubrid snake first described in 2024. The species was named after American actor Leonardo DiCaprio.
