= Cnemaspis avasabinae =

Scientific classification
- Kingdom: Animalia
- Phylum: Chordata
- Class: Reptilia
- Order: Squamata
- Suborder: Gekkota
- Family: Gekkonidae
- Genus: Cnemaspis
- Species: C. avasabinae

Binomial name
- Cnemaspis avasabinae Agarwal, Bauer & Khandekar, 2020
- Cnemaspis avasabinae is only known from the Velikonda Range of the Eastern Ghats, India

Species of gecko found in India

Cnemaspis avasabinae, or Sabin's Nellore dwarf gecko, is a species of gecko endemic to India. It is found in the Eastern Ghats.

== Description ==
The species is distinct from all other Cnemaspis species in its small size of 29 mm (1.1 in) from snout to vent. It is coloured grey-pink on the dorsal (back) side and has six pairs of dark brown patches running down its back. Notably, the males of this species lack femoral pores.

== Habitat ==
The gecko is currently known from only one locality in Andhra Pradesh's Nellore district, in the Velikonda Range of the Eastern Ghats. The locality is near a stream in a dry evergreen forest at an elevation of 200 m above sea level.

== Habit ==
The gecko is rock-dwelling, and is active at and just after dusk.
