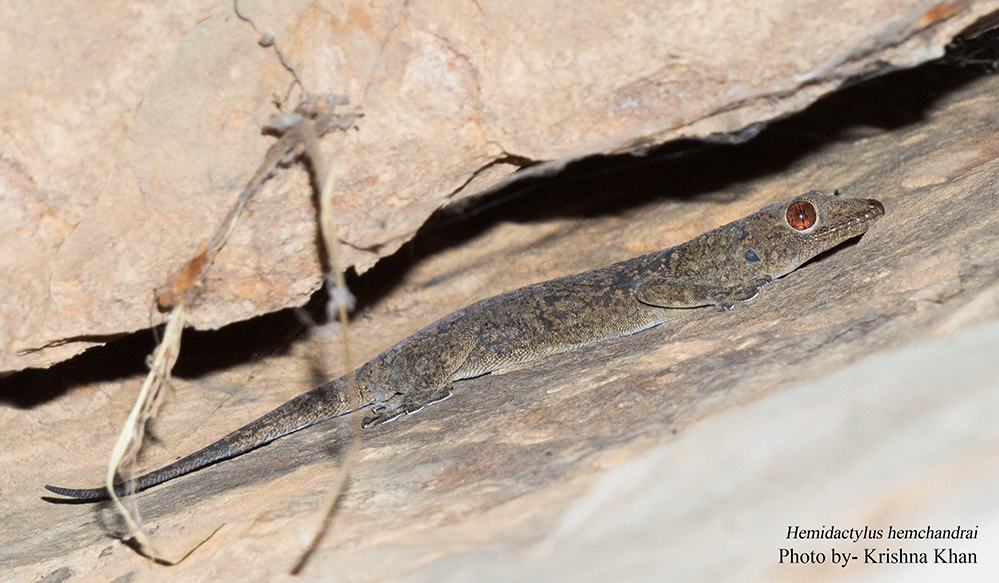

Scientific classification
- Kingdom: Animalia
- Phylum: Chordata
- Class: Reptilia
- Order: Squamata
- Suborder: Gekkota
- Family: Gekkonidae
- Genus: Hemidactylus
- Species: H. hemchandrai

Binomial name
- Hemidactylus hemchandrai Dandge & Tiple, 2015

= Hemidactylus hemchandrai =

Species of lizard

Hemidactylus hemchandrai is a species of gecko. It is endemic to India.
