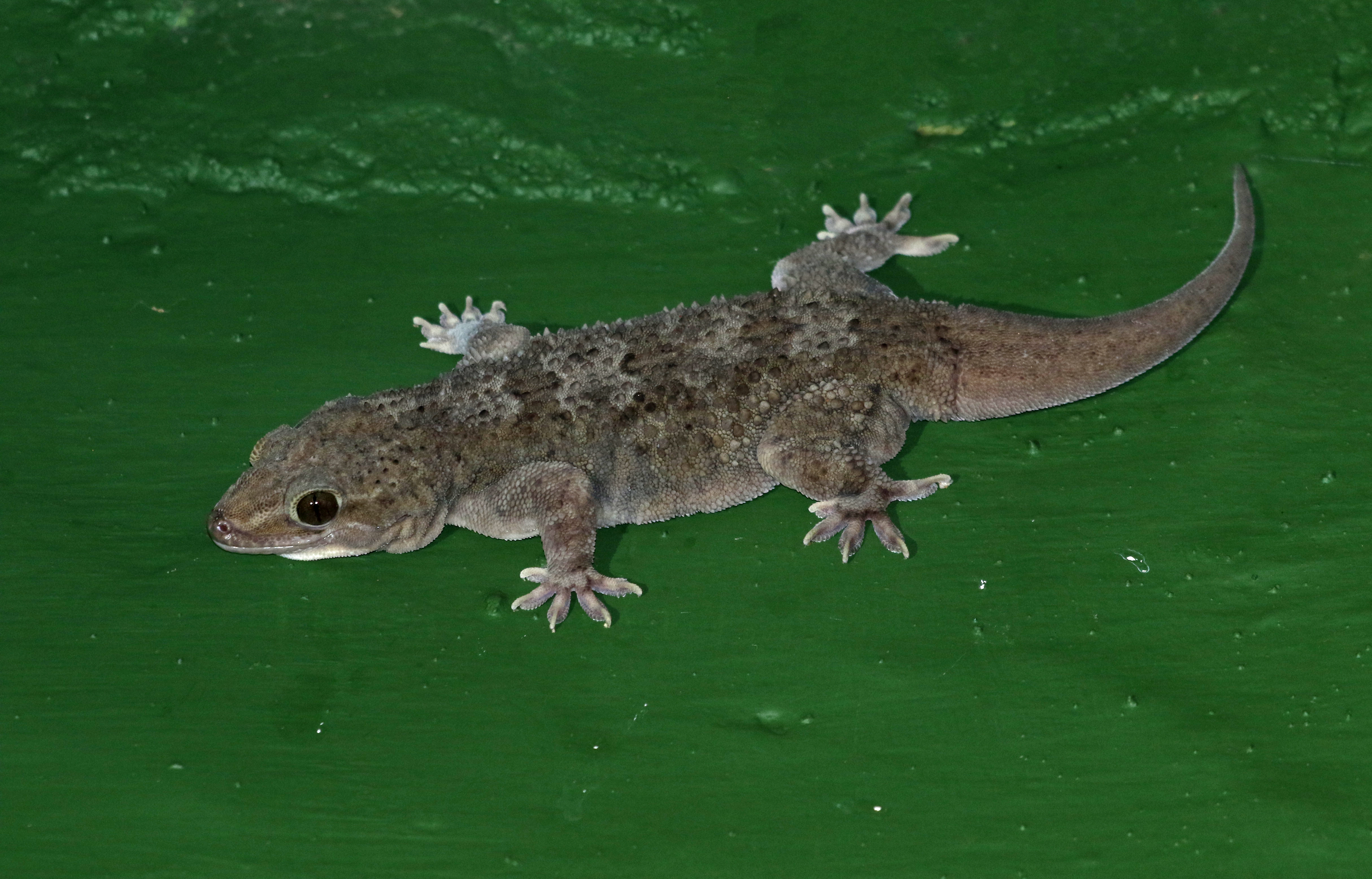

Conservation status
- Least Concern (IUCN 3.1)

Scientific classification
- Kingdom: Animalia
- Phylum: Chordata
- Order: Squamata
- Suborder: Gekkota
- Family: Gekkonidae
- Genus: Hemidactylus
- Species: H. graniticolus

Binomial name
- Hemidactylus graniticolus Agarwal, Giri & Bauer, 2011

= Hemidactylus graniticolus =

Species of lizard

Hemidactylus graniticolus is a cryptic rock-dwelling species of large gecko found in India. The holotype was described from hills near Harohalli village in the Bangalore Rural District, Karnataka.

== Etymology ==
The species is named graniticolus because it dwells upon the granite rock formations.
