= Hemidactylus vijayraghavani =

Scientific classification
- Kingdom: Animalia
- Phylum: Chordata
- Class: Reptilia
- Order: Squamata
- Suborder: Gekkota
- Family: Gekkonidae
- Genus: Hemidactylus
- Species: H. vijayraghavani

Binomial name
- Hemidactylus vijayraghavani Mirza, 2018

Species of lizard

Hemidactylus vijayraghavani is a species of gecko. It is endemic to Karnataka in India. It is a small, fairly stout gecko. The male holotype measures 37 mm (1.5 in) and female paratype 39 mm (1.5 in) in snout–vent length.
