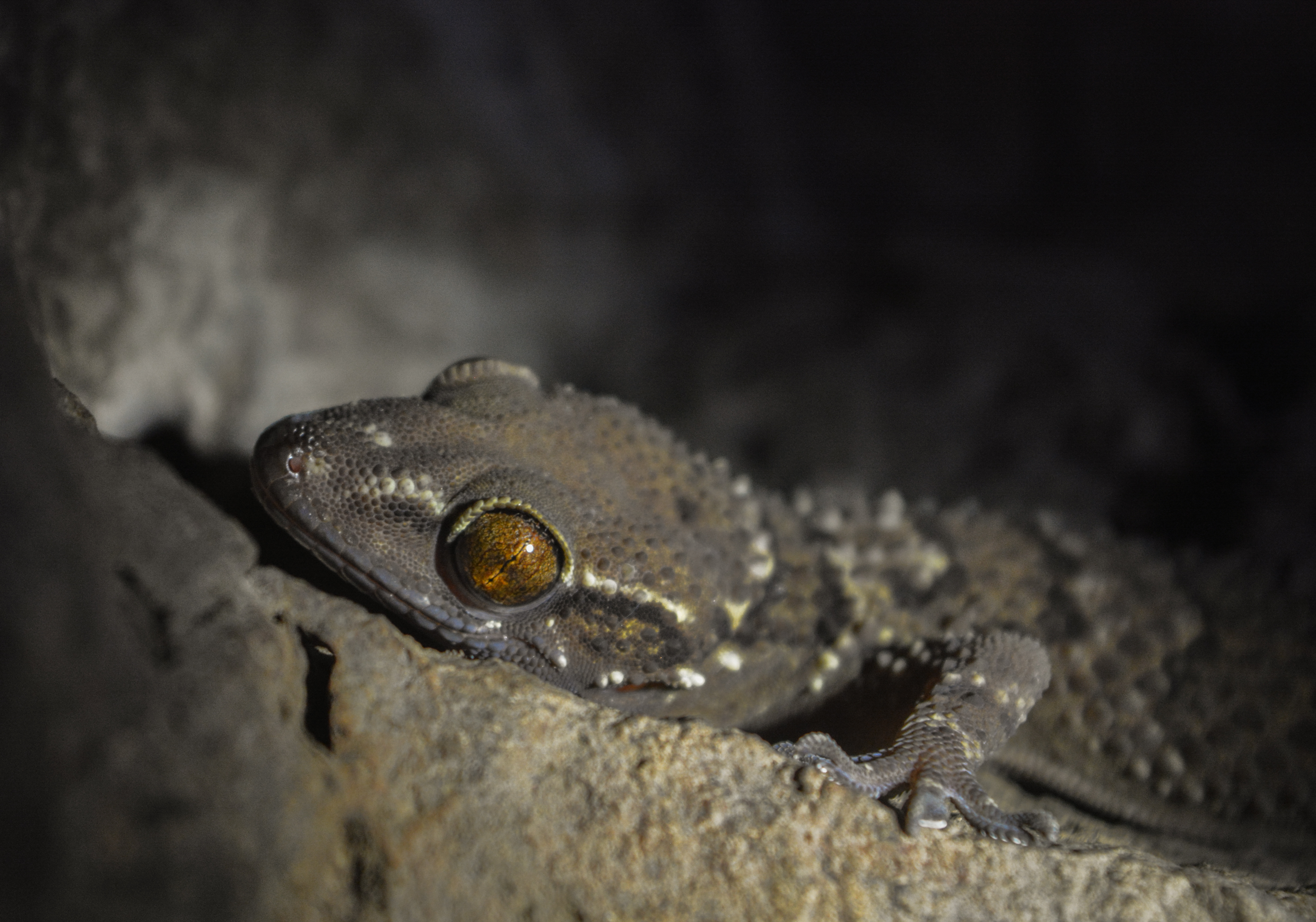
- Dutta's Mahendragiri gecko from Simhachalam hills

Conservation status
- Least Concern (IUCN 3.1)

Scientific classification
- Kingdom: Animalia
- Phylum: Chordata
- Order: Squamata
- Suborder: Gekkota
- Family: Gekkonidae
- Genus: Hemidactylus
- Species: H. sushilduttai

Binomial name
- Hemidactylus sushilduttai Giri, Bauer, Mohapatra, Srinivasulu & Agarwal, 2017

= Dutta's Mahendragiri gecko =

Species of lizard

Dutta's Mahendragiri gecko (Hemidactylus sushilduttai) is a species of large-bodied, tuberculate gecko, found in Andhra Pradesh in India.

== Anatomy ==
It has a snout to vent length up to at least 105 mm. It is also characterized by a dorsal scalation of small granules intermixed with large, pointed, trihedral tubercles that form 16–17 fairly regularly arranged longitudinal rows at midbody; 9–11 subdigital lamellae below the first and 11–13 below the fourth digit; 6–8 strongly pointed and keeled enlarged tubercles on the original tail; 20–23 femoral pores separated by 4 poreless scales in males; 11–13 supralabials and 9–11 infralabials.
