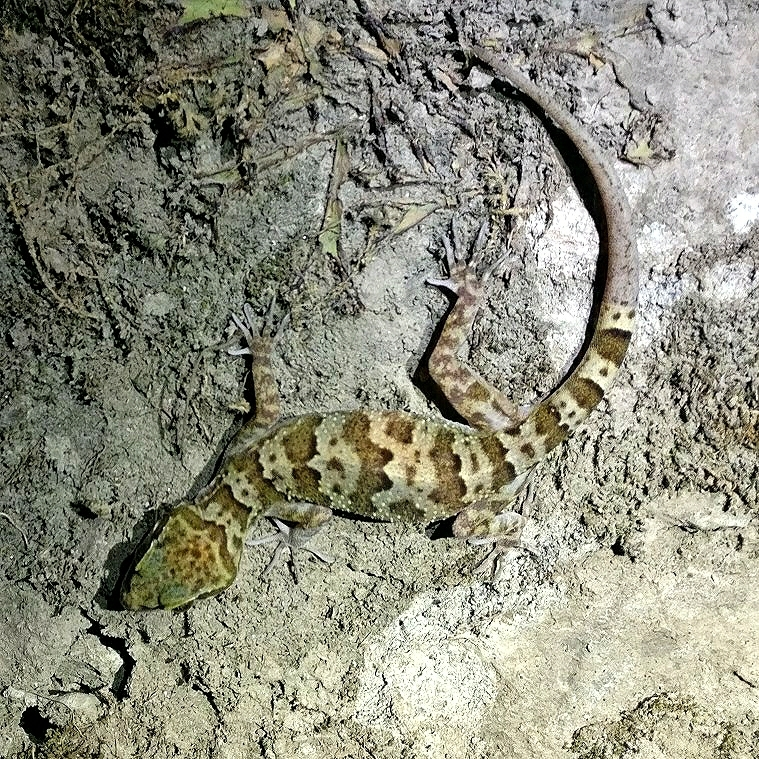

Scientific classification
- Kingdom: Animalia
- Phylum: Chordata
- Class: Reptilia
- Order: Squamata
- Suborder: Gekkota
- Family: Gekkonidae
- Genus: Cyrtodactylus
- Species: C. fasciolatus

Binomial name
- Cyrtodactylus fasciolatus (Blyth, 1861)

Synonyms
- Gymnodactylus fasciolatus; Tenuidactylus fasciolatus; Gonydactylus fasciolatus; Cyrtopodion fasciolatus; Cyrtopodion fasciolatum; Siwaligekko fasciolatus

= Cyrtodactylus fasciolatus =

Species of lizard

Cyrtodactylus fasciolatus, commonly known as the banded bent-toed gecko, is a species of gecko found in north-western India (West Himalaya, Subathu/ Simla, Garhwal Hills, Almora, Kumaon, Himachal Pradesh). Type locality: Subathu, Simla District.
