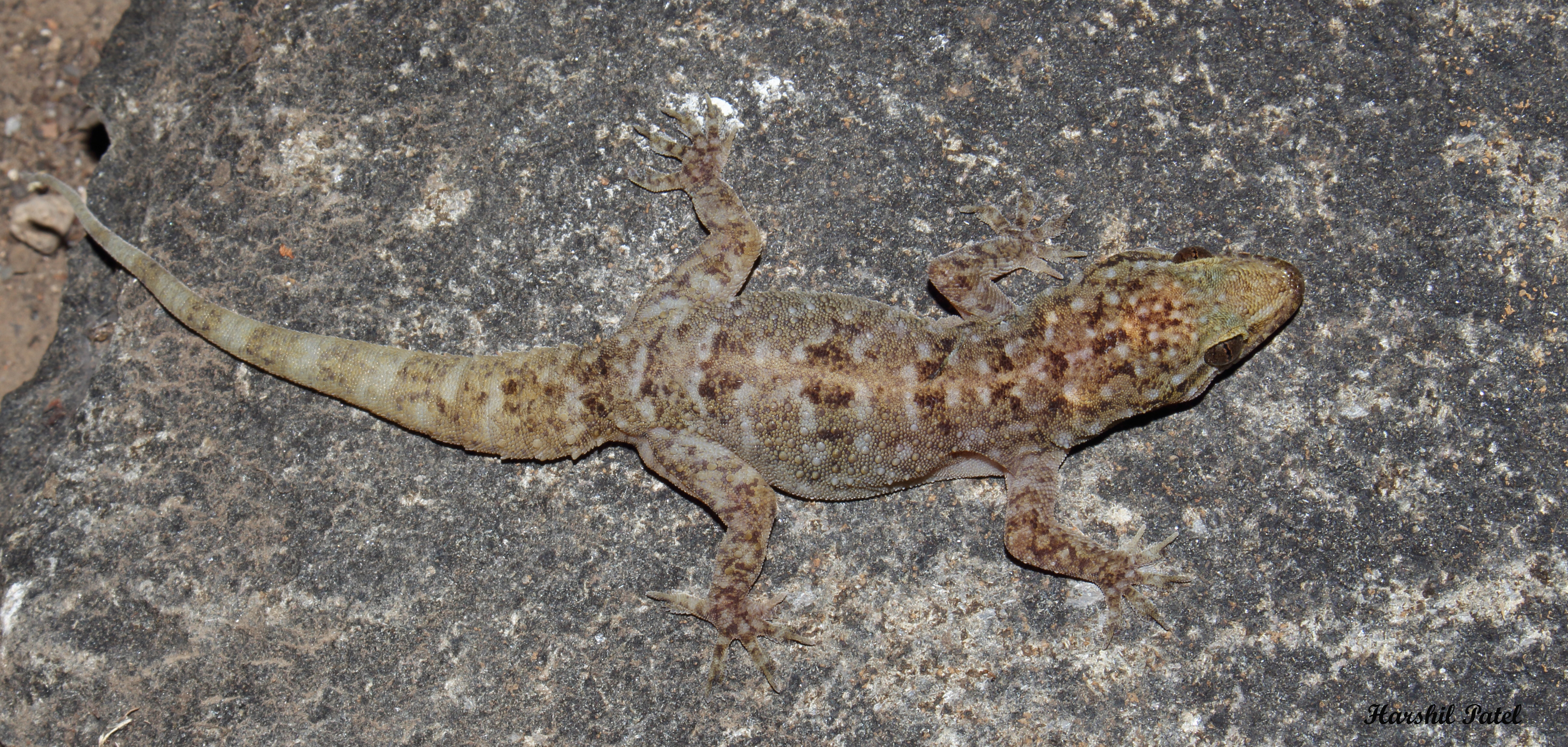

Conservation status
- Vulnerable (IUCN 3.1)

Scientific classification
- Kingdom: Animalia
- Phylum: Chordata
- Order: Squamata
- Suborder: Gekkota
- Family: Gekkonidae
- Genus: Hemidactylus
- Species: H. gujaratensis

Binomial name
- Hemidactylus gujaratensis Giri, Bauer, Vyas, & Patil, 2009

= Gujarat gecko =

Species of lizard

The Gujarat gecko (Hemidactylus gujaratensis) is a species of gecko. This gecko specie is endemic to Gujarat state of India. It was first recorded in Girnar hills of Gujarat.
