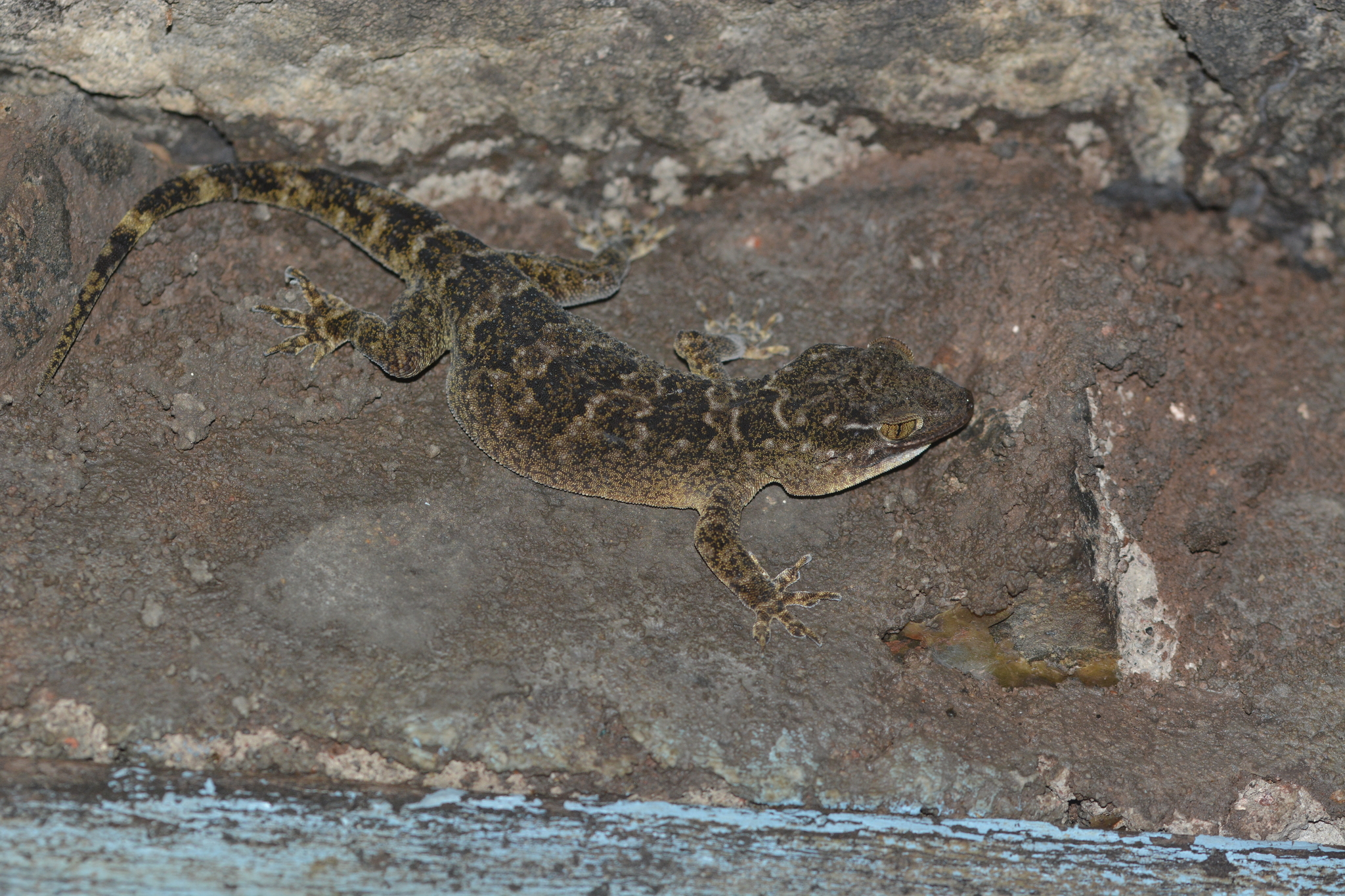

Conservation status
- Least Concern (IUCN 3.1)

Scientific classification
- Kingdom: Animalia
- Phylum: Chordata
- Class: Reptilia
- Order: Squamata
- Suborder: Gekkota
- Family: Gekkonidae
- Genus: Hemidactylus
- Species: H. aaronbaueri

Binomial name
- Hemidactylus aaronbaueri Giri, 2008

= Aaron Bauer's house gecko =

Species of lizard

Aaron Bauer's house gecko (Hemidactylus aaronbaueri) is a species of lizard in the family Gekkonidae. The species is endemic to the Western Ghats in Maharashtra, India.

== Etymology ==
The specific name, aaronbaueri, is in honour of American herpetologist Aaron Matthew Bauer.

== Description ==
Large for its genus, H. aaronbaueri may attain a snout-to-vent length (SVL) of 13 cm (5.1 in).

== Habitat ==
The preferred natural habitat of H. aaronbaueri is rocky outcrops in forest, at altitudes of 250–1,000 m (820–3,280 ft).

== Reproduction ==
H. aaronbaueri is oviparous.
