= Cyrtodactylus kamengensis =

Scientific classification
- Kingdom: Animalia
- Phylum: Chordata
- Class: Reptilia
- Order: Squamata
- Suborder: Gekkota
- Family: Gekkonidae
- Genus: Cyrtodactylus
- Species: C. kamengensis

Binomial name
- Cyrtodactylus kamengensis Mirza, Bhosale, Thackeray, Phansalkar, Sawant, Gowande, & Patel, 2022

Gecko endemic to India

Cyrtodactylus kamengensis is a species of gecko that is endemic to India.
