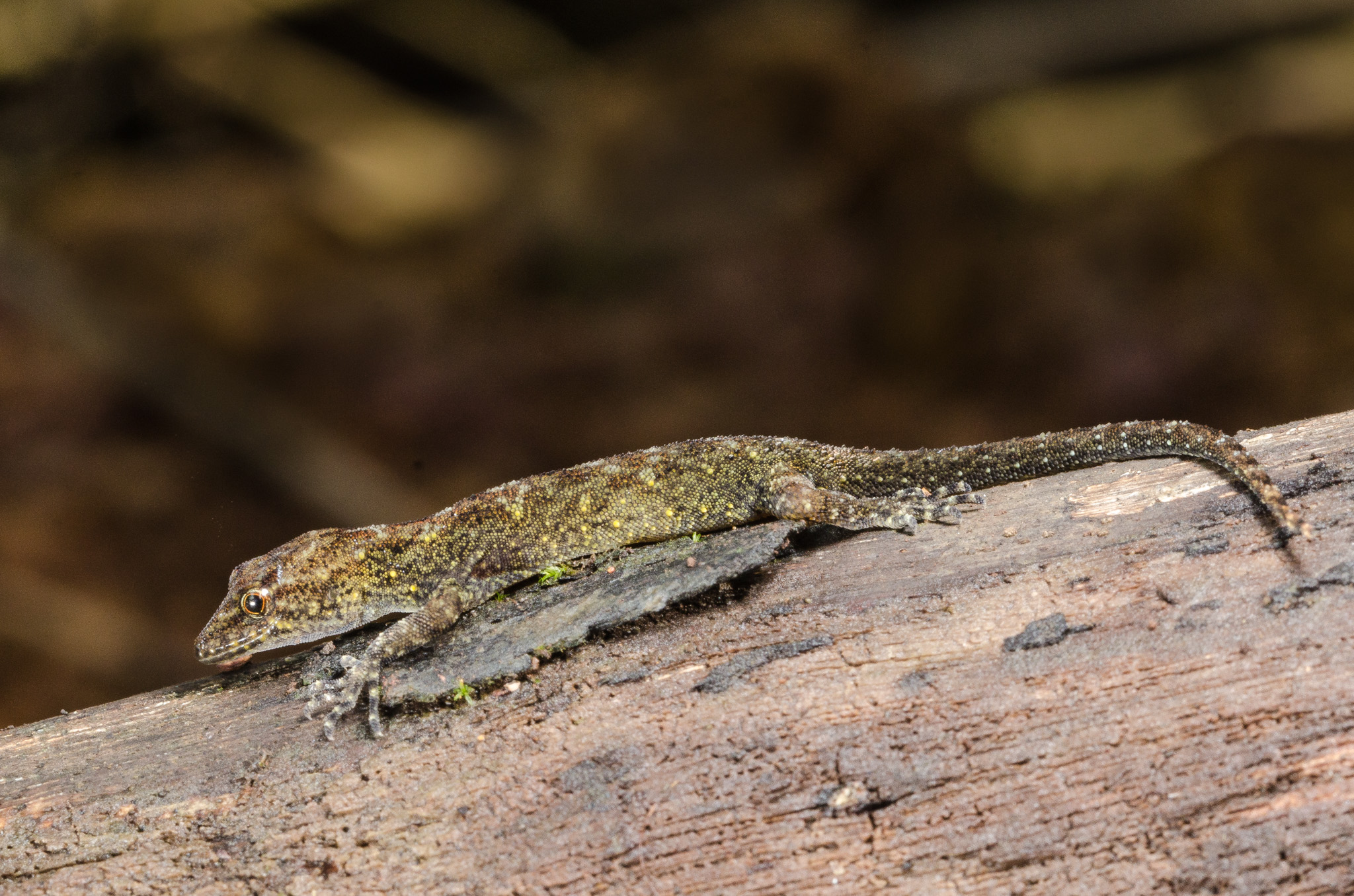

Scientific classification
- Kingdom: Animalia
- Phylum: Chordata
- Class: Reptilia
- Order: Squamata
- Suborder: Gekkota
- Family: Gekkonidae
- Genus: Cnemaspis
- Species: C. girii

Binomial name
- Cnemaspis girii Mirza, Pal, Bhosale & Sanap, 2014

= Cnemaspis girii =

Species of lizard

Cnemaspis girii, also known as Giri's day gecko, is a species of geckos in the genus Cnemaspis described in 2014. The species, found in the forests of the Kaas plateau in Satara district, Maharashtra, India, was discovered by researchers from Bangalore's National Centre for Biological Sciences (NCBS) and Centre for Ecological Sciences (CES). The gecko lives under rocks and hollowed out trees near water bodies within its range.

== Etymology ==
It is named after Dr. Varad Giri of the Bombay Natural History Society.

== Description ==
The lizard has yellow dots on its body and is yellowish in color, and features dark markings on its body with a black spot on its neck. It is usually smaller than two inches.
