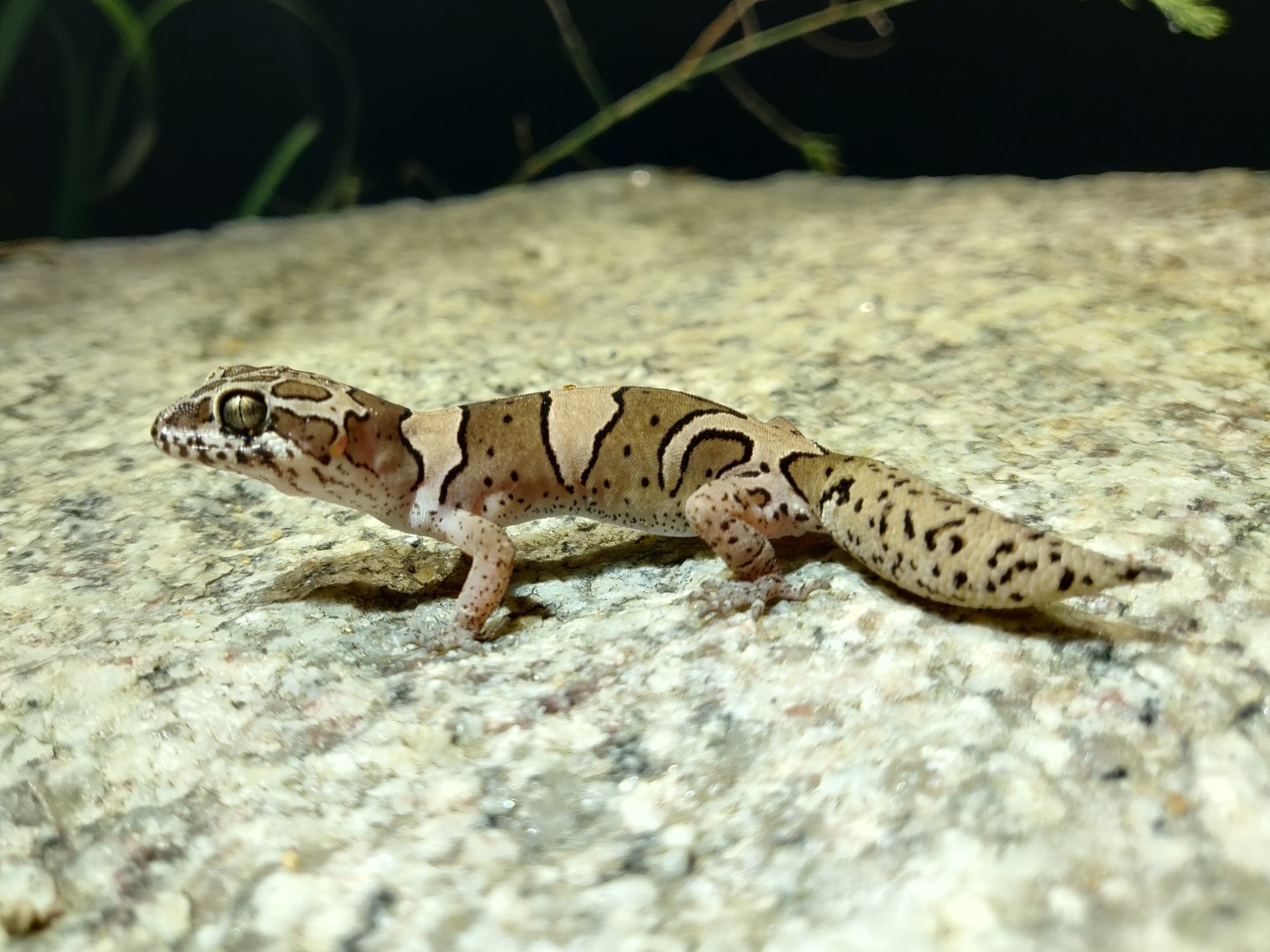

Conservation status
- Near Threatened (IUCN 3.1)

Scientific classification
- Kingdom: Animalia
- Phylum: Chordata
- Class: Reptilia
- Order: Squamata
- Suborder: Gekkota
- Family: Gekkonidae
- Genus: Cyrtodactylus
- Species: C. srilekhae

Binomial name
- Cyrtodactylus srilekhae Agarwal, 2016

= Bangalore geckoella =

Species of lizard

The Bangalore geckoella (Cyrtodactylus srilekhae) is a species of nocturnal terrestrial gecko, a lizard in the family Gekkonidae. The species is endemic to India.

== Etymology ==
The specific name, srilekhae, is in honor of Srilekha Agarwal, who is the mother of the binomial authority.

== Geographic range ==
C. srilekhae is found in the Eastern Ghats and parts of hilly surrounding terrain, in Mysore plateau. It is recorded from the outskirts of the city of Bangalore and adjacent regions, along the borders of Karnataka and Tamil Nadu states (in the Melagiri hills), in South India.

== Habitat ==
C. srilekhae inhabits dense leaf-litter and hides under stones on the forest floor of mixed deciduous forest tracts on hill slopes.

== Description ==
Small for its genus, C. srilekhae may attain a snout-to-vent length of 5 cm (2.0 in). It is often confused with C. collegalensis.

== Reproduction ==
C. srilekhae is oviparous.
