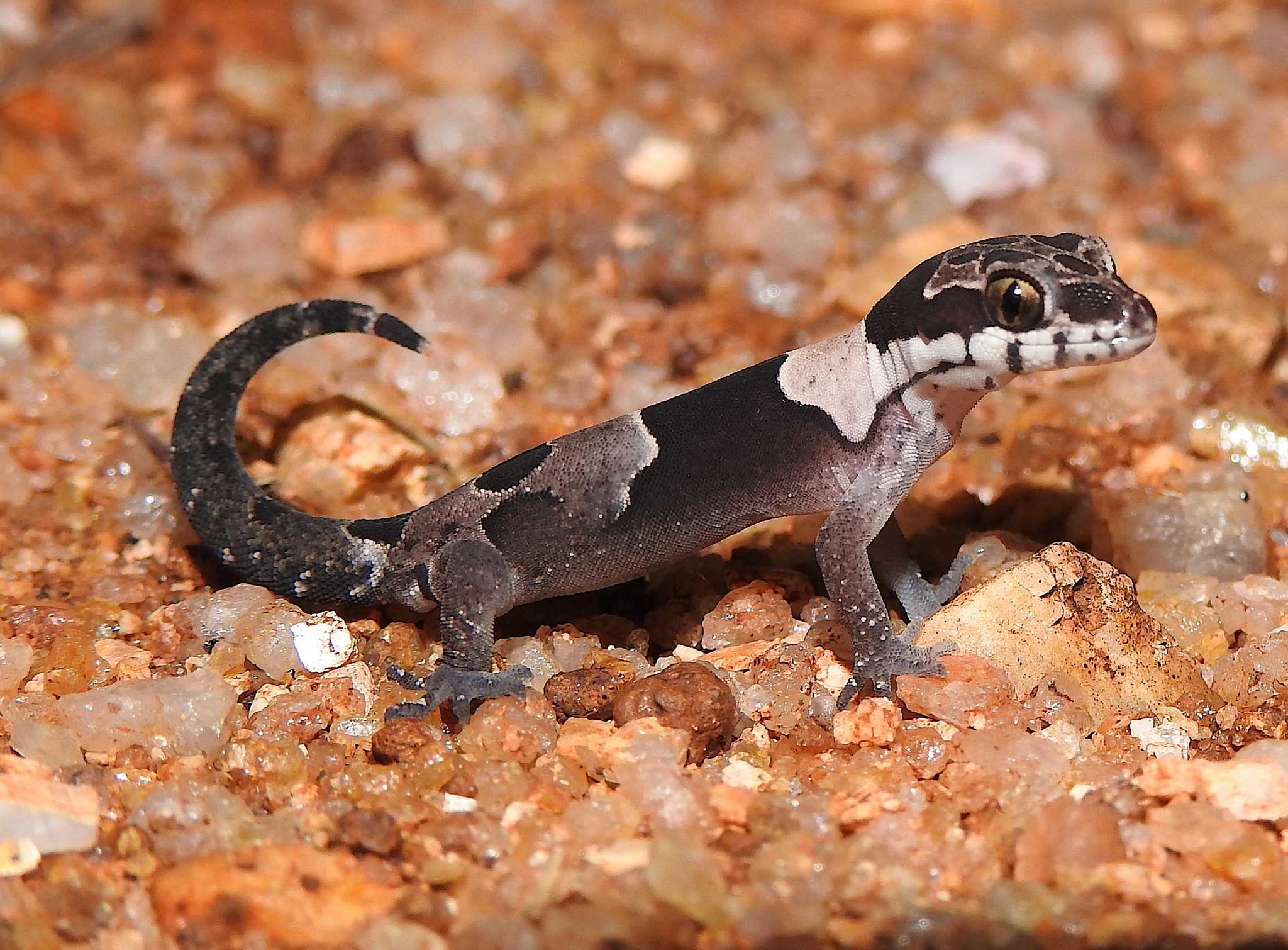
- Female

Scientific classification
- Kingdom: Animalia
- Phylum: Chordata
- Order: Squamata
- Suborder: Gekkota
- Family: Gekkonidae
- Genus: Cyrtodactylus
- Species: C. aravindi

Binomial name
- Cyrtodactylus aravindi Narayanan, Das, Balan, Tom, Divakar, Kp, Hopeland, & Deepak, 2022.

= Cyrtodactylus aravindi =

Species of lizard

Cyrtodactylus aravindi is a species of gecko endemic to the Western Ghats of India. It has been given the common name Aravind’s ground gecko.

== Etymology ==
Cyrtodactylus aravindi is named after Dr N. A. Aravind, Senior Fellow at ATREE, Bengaluru, India for his support towards herpetological research.

== Distribution ==
Cyrtodactylus aravindi is currently only known from two locations 20 kilometres from each other in straight-line distance in the Agasthaymalai hill range in the southern Western Ghats of India.

== Ecology ==
Cyrtodactylus aravindi occurs in lower density in open scrub habitat but prefers areas with high grass, shrub and tree cover with open edges.The type locality of C. aravindi is within the rain shadow region with very high winds on the eastern slopes of the Western Ghats close to the Aralvaimozhi pass. C. aravindi is a nocturnal species and the type series of the species was collected from the ground at night between 19:30–22.00 hrs.

The type specimens were collected from a small area in the type locality, an isolated southern tropical dry evergreen scrub forest patch, the woody trees Tamarindus indica, Ficus religiosa and other shrubs with some history of agriculture about two decades ago. C.aravindi appears to be an uncommon species.

Specimens were collected from bottom of shrubs, leaf litter covered by banyan trees, mud paths covered by vegetation consisting of bushes and grasses, hilly terrain mainly composed of rubber plantations intermixed with coffee and coconut plantations.
