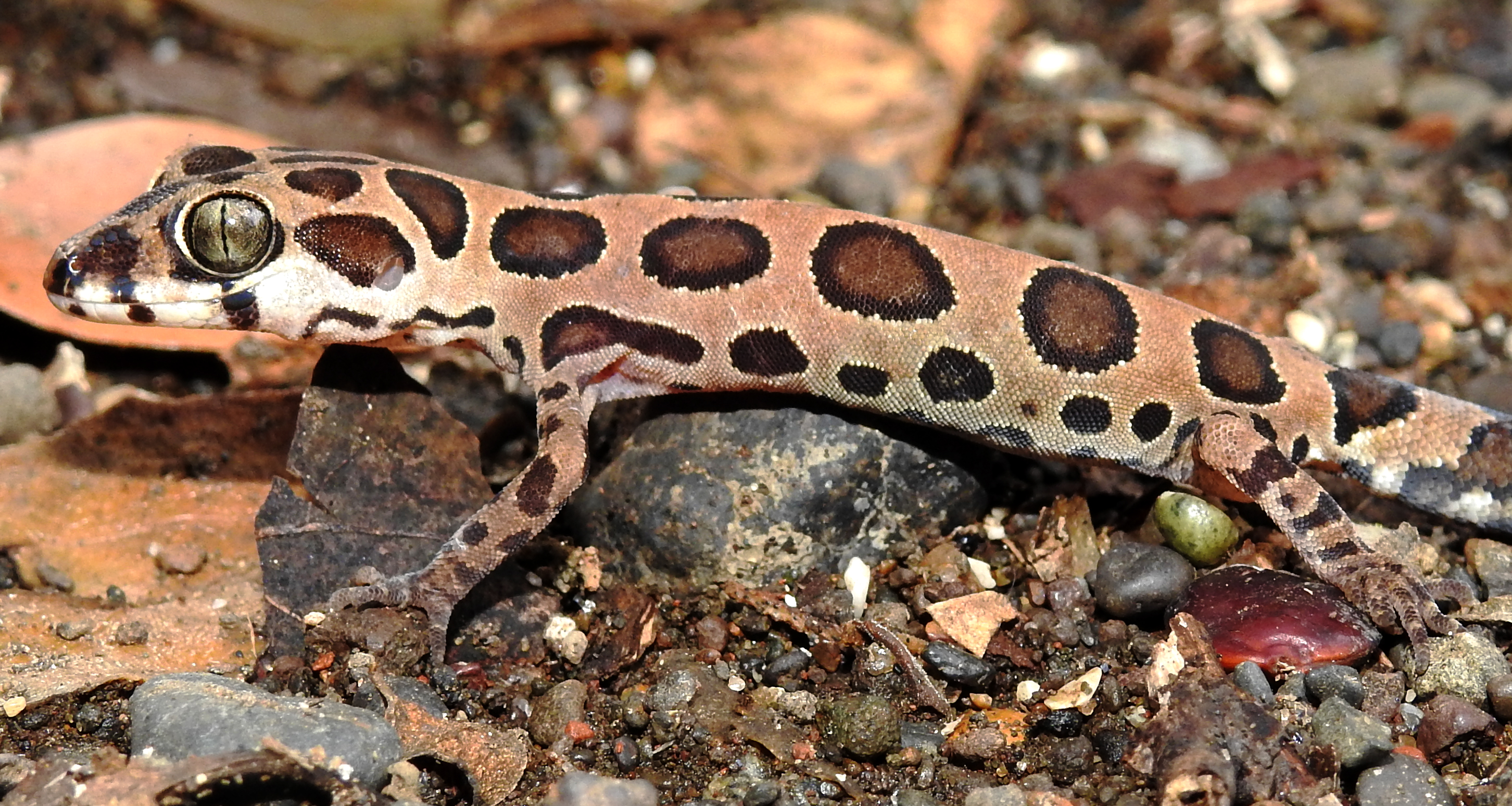

Scientific classification
- Kingdom: Animalia
- Phylum: Chordata
- Class: Reptilia
- Order: Squamata
- Suborder: Gekkota
- Family: Gekkonidae
- Genus: Cyrtodactylus
- Species: C. varadgirii

Binomial name
- Cyrtodactylus varadgirii Agarwal, Mirza, Pal, Maddock, Mishra & Bauer, 2016

= Giri's geckoella =

Species of reptile

Giri's geckoella (Cyrtodactylus varadgirii) is a species of gecko, a lizard in the family Gekkonidae. The species is endemic to India.

== Etymology ==
The specific name, varadgirii, is in honour of Indian herpetologist Varad Giri.

== Geographic range ==
C. varadgirii is found in parts of western and central India. It is one of the most widely distributed members of this genus in India, occurring throughout most of the state of Maharashtra and parts of the states of Madhya Pradesh and Gujarat.

== Behaviour and habitat ==
C. varadgirii is nocturnal, insectivorous and terrestrial, living in dense leaf-litter on the forest floor.

== Description ==
Small for its genus, C. varadgirii may attain a snout-to-vent length (SVL) of 5.5 cm (2.2 in).

== Reproduction ==
C. varadgirii is oviparous.
