= Central Indian leaf-toed gecko =

Conservation status
- Least Concern (IUCN 3.1)

Scientific classification
- Kingdom: Animalia
- Phylum: Chordata
- Class: Reptilia
- Order: Squamata
- Suborder: Gekkota
- Family: Gekkonidae
- Genus: Hemidactylus
- Species: H. chipkali

Binomial name
- Hemidactylus chipkali Mirza & Raju, 2017

Species of lizard

The Central Indian leaf-toed gecko (Hemidactylus chipkali) is a species of gecko. It is endemic to Madhya Pradesh in India.
