= Cyrtodactylus kazirangaensis =

Conservation status
- Data Deficient (IUCN 3.1)

Scientific classification
- Kingdom: Animalia
- Phylum: Chordata
- Class: Reptilia
- Order: Squamata
- Suborder: Gekkota
- Family: Gekkonidae
- Genus: Cyrtodactylus
- Species: C. kazirangaensis

Binomial name
- Cyrtodactylus kazirangaensis Agarwal, Mahony, Giri, Chaitanya, & Bauer, 2018

Species of lizard

Cyrtodactylus kazirangaensis is a species of gecko. It is endemic to Assam, Northeast India, where it is only known from its type locality at the northern edge of the Mikir Hills. Its true range could extend into the Kaziranga National Park, to which its specific name refers to.

This species grows to at least 80 mm (3.1 in) in snout–vent length.
