= Himalayan bent-toed gecko =

Scientific classification
- Kingdom: Animalia
- Phylum: Chordata
- Class: Reptilia
- Order: Squamata
- Suborder: Gekkota
- Family: Gekkonidae
- Genus: Cyrtodactylus
- Species: C. himalayanus

Binomial name
- Cyrtodactylus himalayanus (Duda & Sahi, 1978)

Synonyms
- Tenuidactylus himalayanus; Gonydactylus himalayanus; Cyrtopodion himalayanus; Siwaligekko himalayanus; Cyrtopodion himalayanum

Species of lizard

The Himalayan bent-toed gecko (Cyrtopodion himalayanus) is a species of gecko found in northern India (Jammu and Kashmir) and western Nepal. It is sometimes placed in the genus Cyrtopodion.
