= Cnemaspis stellapulvis =

Scientific classification
- Kingdom: Animalia
- Phylum: Chordata
- Class: Reptilia
- Order: Squamata
- Suborder: Gekkota
- Family: Gekkonidae
- Genus: Cnemaspis
- Species: C. stellapulvis

Binomial name
- Cnemaspis stellapulvis Khandekar, Thackeray, & Agarwal, 2020

Species of lizard

Cnemaspis stellapulvis is a species of diurnal, insectivorous, rock-dwelling gecko endemic to the Mysore Plateau of Karnataka in South India. It occurs only in an isolated hill range near Yadiyur of Mandya district and Tumkur district border.
