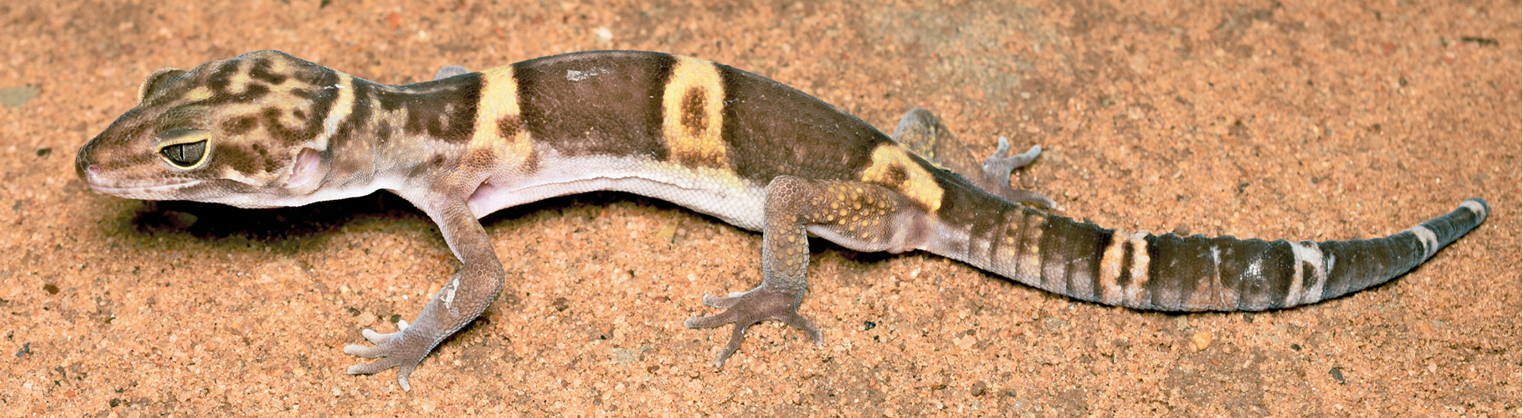

Scientific classification
- Kingdom: Animalia
- Phylum: Chordata
- Class: Reptilia
- Order: Squamata
- Suborder: Gekkota
- Family: Eublepharidae
- Genus: Eublepharis
- Species: E. jhuma

Binomial name
- Eublepharis jhuma Mohapatra, Ray, Das, Satrusallya, Jena, Bhupathi, Das & Mahapatra, 2026

= Eublepharis jhuma =

Species of lizard

Eublepharis jhuma is a species of leopard gecko in the family Eublepharidae. It was discovered in the Kaimur Hills near the Kaimur Wildlife Sanctuary in Bihar, India. It was the seventh species in the family Eublepharidae to be described.

== Etymology ==
It was named in honour of zoologist Dhriti Banerjee, whose nickname is "Jhuma".

== Description ==
The species was identified through morphological and mitochondrial DNA analysis in 2026, having initially been considered part of an already classified form of lizard species. It is the first species of the genus Eublepharis recorded from Bihar. It also has distinctive dark brown markings and large, flat dorsal scales. The species primarily inhabits deciduous forests, and its discovery extended the known range of leopard geckos in Bihar.
