= Hemidactylus sirumalaiensis =

Scientific classification
- Kingdom: Animalia
- Phylum: Chordata
- Class: Reptilia
- Order: Squamata
- Suborder: Gekkota
- Family: Gekkonidae
- Genus: Hemidactylus
- Species: H. sirumalaiensis

Binomial name
- Hemidactylus sirumalaiensis Khandekar, Thackeray, Pawar, & Agarwal, 2020

Species of lizard

Hemidactylus sirumalaiensis is a species of house gecko from India.
