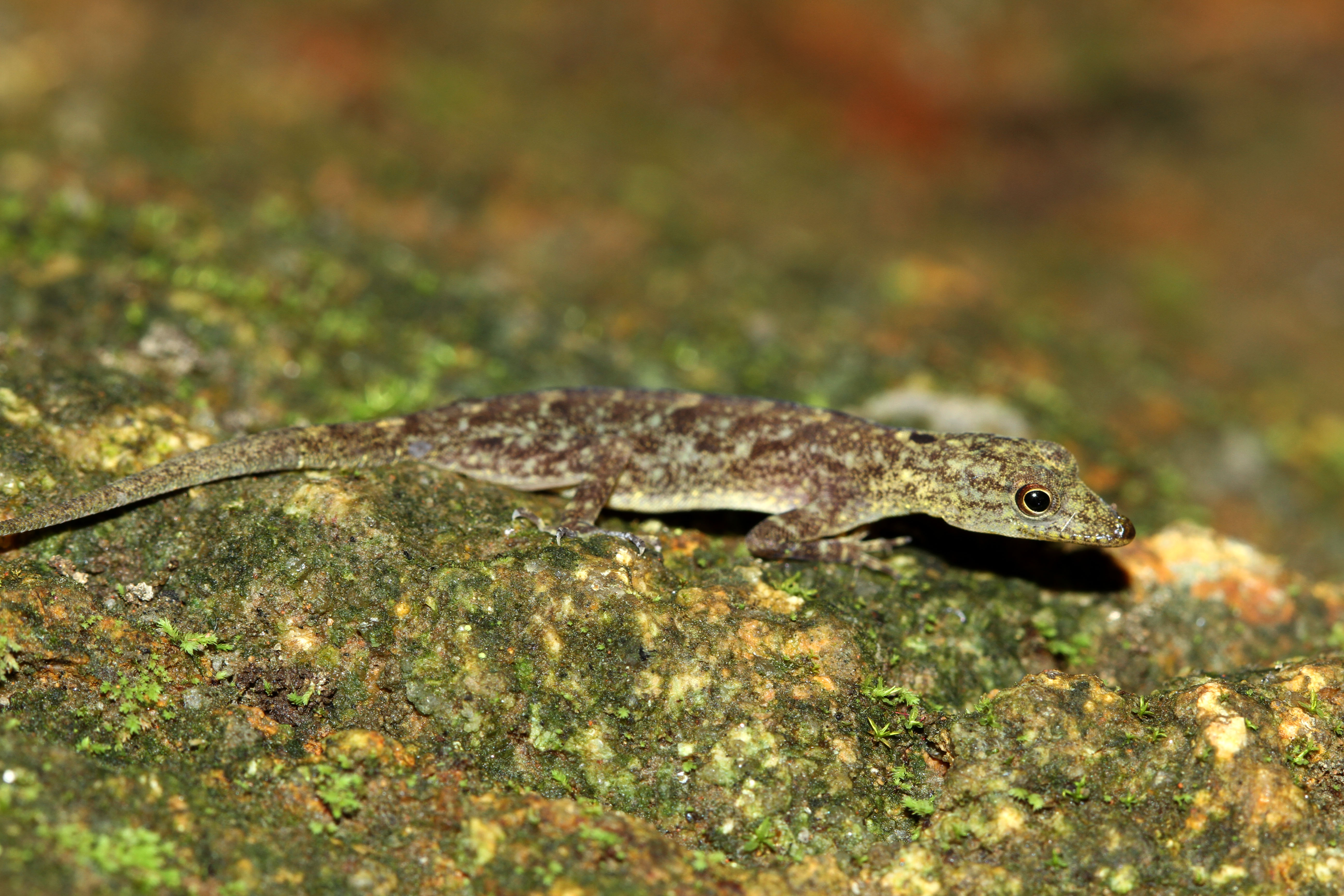

Conservation status
- Data Deficient (IUCN 3.1)

Scientific classification
- Kingdom: Animalia
- Phylum: Chordata
- Class: Reptilia
- Order: Squamata
- Suborder: Gekkota
- Family: Gekkonidae
- Genus: Cnemaspis
- Species: C. littoralis

Binomial name
- Cnemaspis littoralis (Jerdon, 1854)

= Coastal day gecko =

Species of lizard

The coastal day gecko (Cnemaspis littoralis) is a species of gecko found in the Western Ghats of India.

== Distribution ==
This gecko occurs in Malabar, Nilambur, and Nellakota, on the west side of the Nilgiris; it is found on trees in dry teak forests. Jerdon's type specimen was obtained in a warehouse on the seacoast.
