= Pakkamalai =

Mountain and forest reserve in Tamil Nadu, India

Coordinates: 12°10′55″N 79°17′23″E

Pakkamalai is a mountain and forest reserve in Villupuram district of Tamil Nadu, located 45 km southwest of Gingee.

== Geography ==
Pakkamalai is steep-sided plateau that reaches an elevation of over 500 meters. In addition to being a forest reserve, Pakkamalai is a sacred forest. There is a shrine to the Goddess Durga on one of the peaks, and a temple to Perumal (Vishnu) at mid-elevation.

== Climate ==
Maximum temperature ranges from 30° to 36 °C in the summer, and 24 °C during the winter months. Mean annual rainfall is 700 mm.

== Ecology ==
Pakkamalai forest reserve covers an area of 22.38 km^{2}, and the mountain's dry forests contain a mix of species characteristic of the coastal dry evergreen forests which lie to the east, and the dry deciduous forests that lie to the west in the Eastern Ghats. Typical dry evergreen species in the forests include Atalantia monophylla, Acacia intsia, Combretum albidum, Dichrostachys cinerea, and Psydrax dicoccos, and typical dry deciduous species include Cochlospermum religiosum, Deccania pubescens, Garuga pinnata, Hildegardia populifolia, Ochna lanceolata, and Premna tomentosa. It is also home to several endemic and limited-range species. Hubera senjiana, a rare species of tree, is found only on Pakkamalai, growing in dry rocky soils along forest fringes between 200–300 metres elevation in association with Phyllanthus polyphyllus, Stenosiphonium russellianum, and Justicia beddomei.

The surrounding lowlands are in the Deccan thorn scrub forests ecoregion.

Pakkamalai is home to the easternmost population of the grizzled giant squirrel (Ratufa macroura). It was previously known only in the Western Ghats and the Palani Hills.

In 2019, the critically endangered blue tarantula Poecilotheria metallica, known as the peacock parachute spider or Gooty tarantula, was discovered living in the mountains.
