= Khasi Hills bent-toed gecko =

Scientific classification
- Domain: Eukaryota
- Kingdom: Animalia
- Phylum: Chordata
- Class: Reptilia
- Order: Squamata
- Infraorder: Gekkota
- Family: Gekkonidae
- Genus: Cyrtodactylus
- Species: C. khasiensis

Binomial name
- Cyrtodactylus khasiensis (Jerdon, 1870)

Synonyms
- Pentadactylus khasiensis; Gymnodactylus khasiensis; Tenuidactylus khasiensis

Species of lizard

The Khasi Hills bent-toed gecko (Cyrtodactylus khasiensis) is a species of gecko found in Asia.

== Distribution ==
North-eastern Bangladesh, India (Assam, Darjeeling, Khasi Hills), N Burma (Pangnamdim), Bhutan Race tamaiensis: "Upper Burma" (fide WERMUTH 1965); Type locality: Pangnamdim, Nam Tamai Valley, Upper Myanmar. Type locality: Khasi Hills, Assam.
