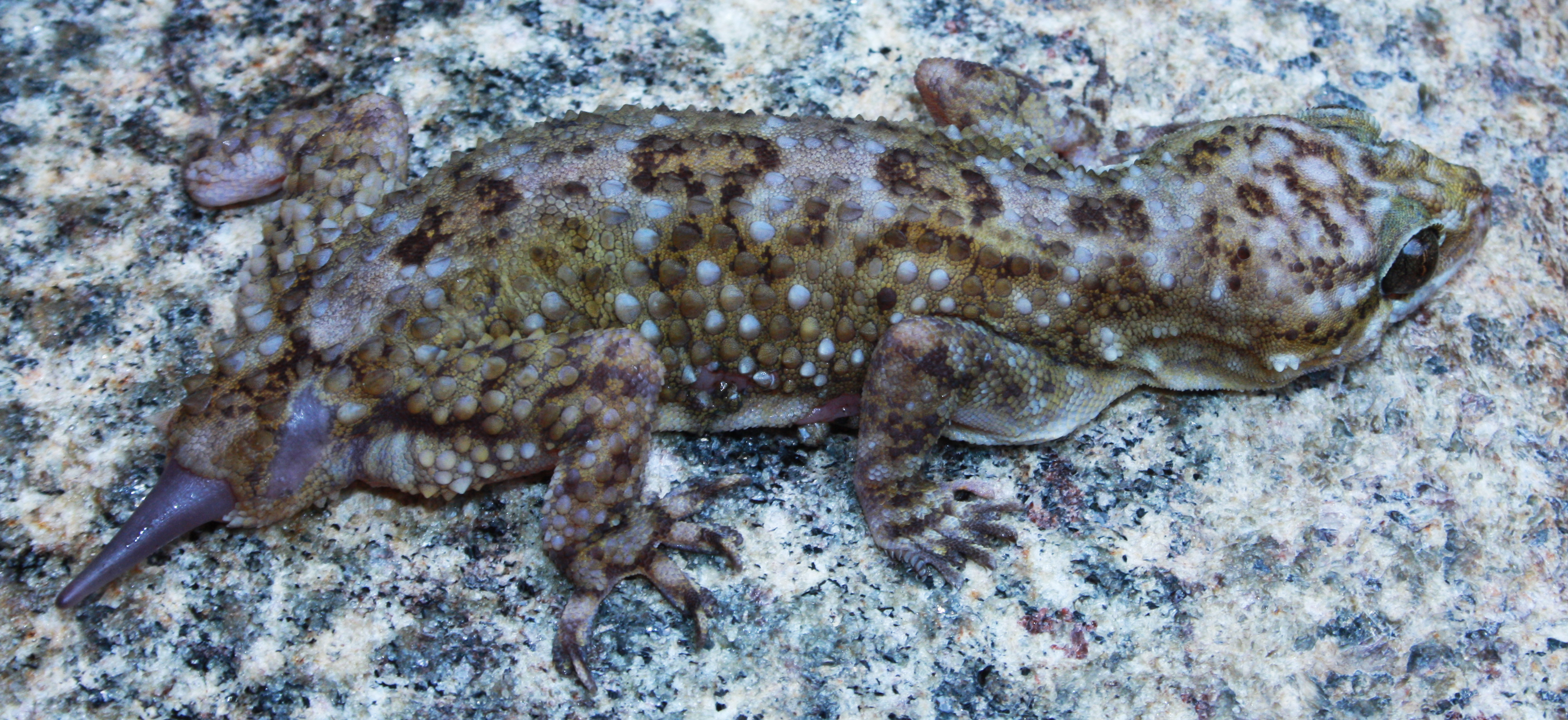

Scientific classification
- Kingdom: Animalia
- Phylum: Chordata
- Class: Reptilia
- Order: Squamata
- Suborder: Gekkota
- Family: Gekkonidae
- Genus: Hemidactylus
- Species: H. acanthopholis

Binomial name
- Hemidactylus acanthopholis Mirza & Sanap, 2014

= Hemidactylus acanthopholis =

Species of lizard

Hemidactylus acanthopholis is a species of house geckos from the Tirunelveli in southern Tamil Nadu. Bearing a superficial resemblance to Hemidactylus maculatus, the species is usually found on large rocks or boulders. Growing 20–23 cm (7.9–9.1 in) in length, the species is an overall brown color, but has dark stripes on its back. It takes its name from the warty protuberances running along its dorsal surface. In the 1800s, Colonel R. H. Beddome had a collection of these specimens. Due to new agricultural practices, the preferred habitat of Hemidactylus acanthopholis has been destroyed. This species can be found during the dry season in the Kalakkad Mundanthirai Tiger Reserve and Tirunelveli.
