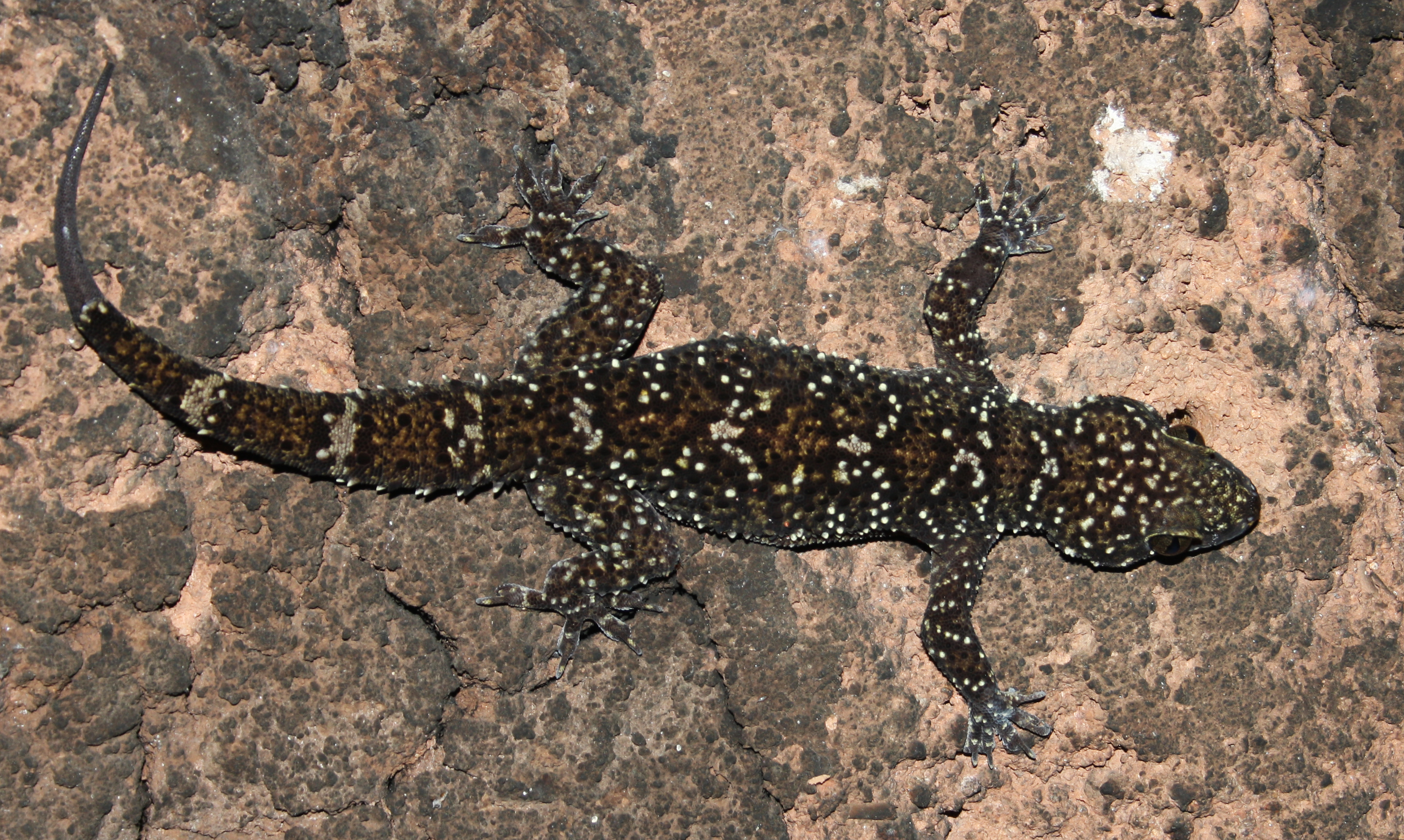

Scientific classification
- Kingdom: Animalia
- Phylum: Chordata
- Class: Reptilia
- Order: Squamata
- Suborder: Gekkota
- Family: Gekkonidae
- Genus: Hemidactylus
- Species: H. paaragowli

Binomial name
- Hemidactylus paaragowli Srikanthan, Swamy, Mohan, & Pal, 2018

= Hemidactylus paaragowli =

Species of house gecko

Hemidactylus paaragowli, also known as the Travancore rock gecko, is a species of large rock-dwelling gecko endemic to Southern Western Ghats of India.
