= Meghamalai rock gecko =

Scientific classification
- Kingdom: Animalia
- Phylum: Chordata
- Order: Squamata
- Suborder: Gekkota
- Family: Gekkonidae
- Genus: Hemidactylus
- Species: H. vanam

Binomial name
- Hemidactylus vanam Chaitanya, Lajmi, & Giri, 2018

Species of lizard

The Meghamalai rock gecko (Hemidactylus vanam) is a species of gecko. It is endemic to Tamil Nadu in India.
