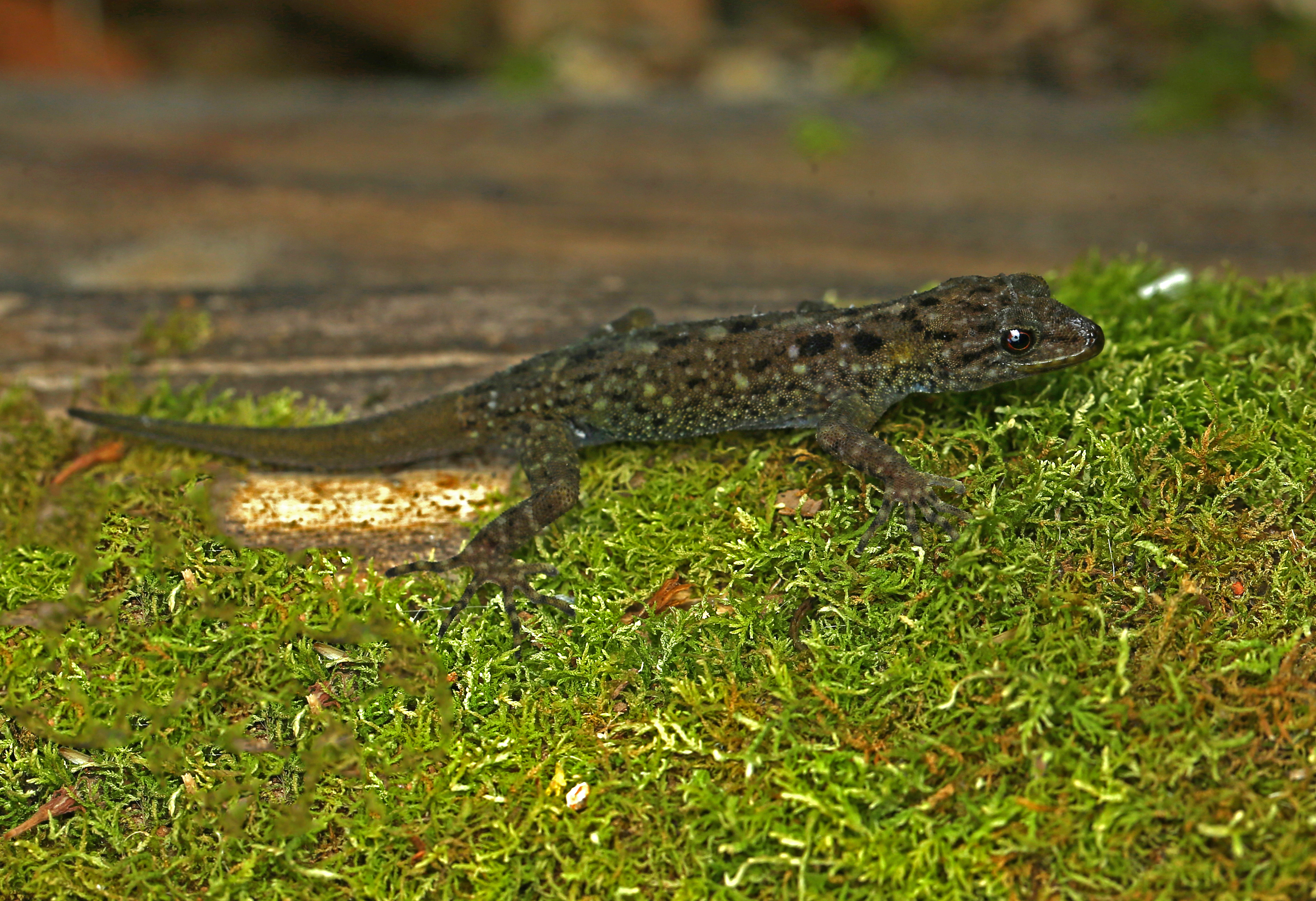

Scientific classification
- Kingdom: Animalia
- Phylum: Chordata
- Class: Reptilia
- Order: Squamata
- Suborder: Gekkota
- Family: Gekkonidae
- Genus: Cnemaspis
- Species: C. smaug

Binomial name
- Cnemaspis smaug Pal, Mirza, Dsouza, & Shanker, 2021

= Cnemaspis smaug =

Species of lizard

Cnemaspis smaug is a species of diurnal, rock-dwelling, insectivorous gecko. It is endemic to India and known from the Cardamom Hills in the southern Western Ghats, Kerala. It is a relatively large, robust Cnemaspis that can grow to 52 mm (2.0 in) in snout–vent length.
