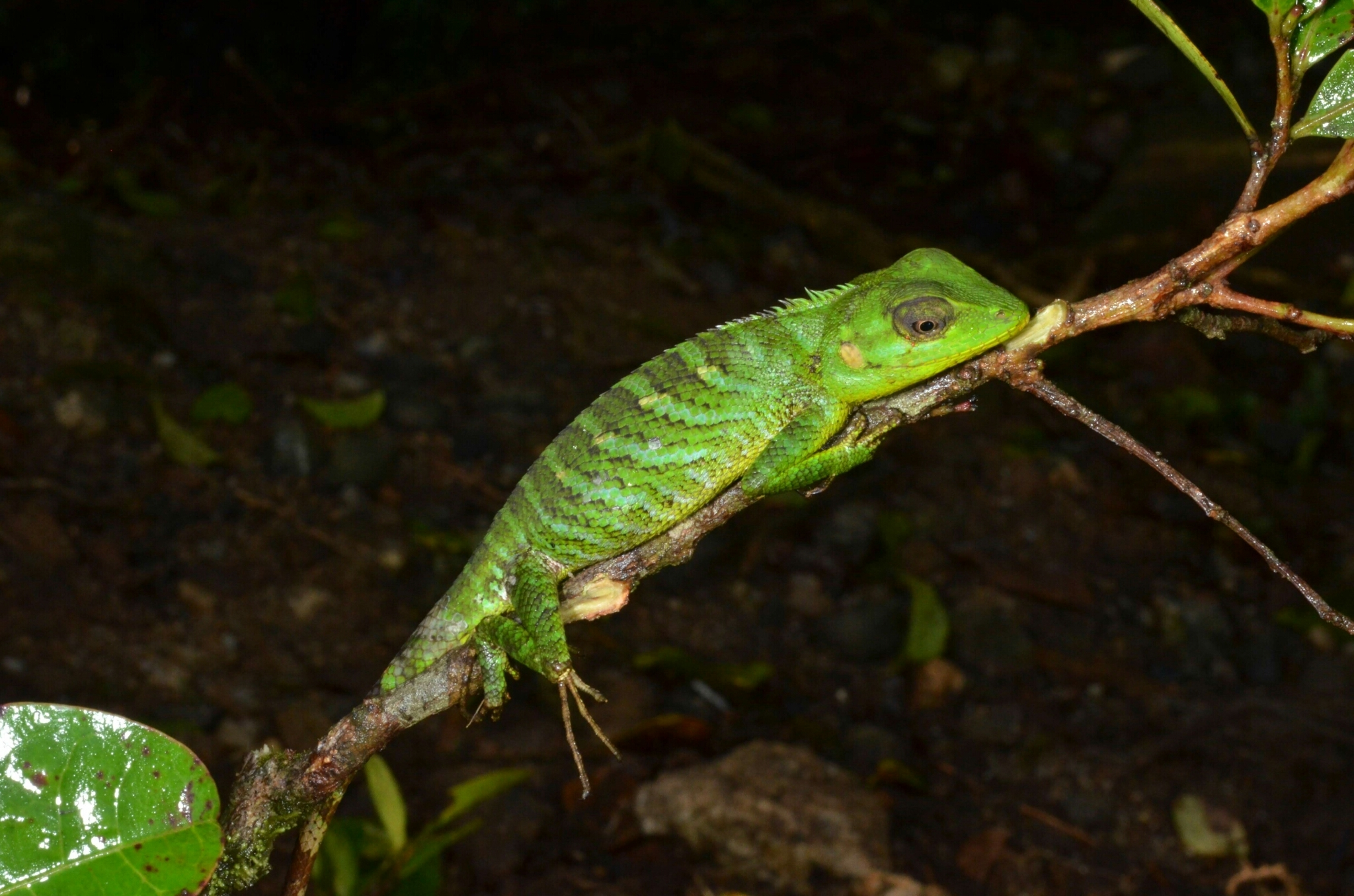

Scientific classification
- Kingdom: Animalia
- Phylum: Chordata
- Class: Reptilia
- Order: Squamata
- Suborder: Iguania
- Family: Agamidae
- Genus: Calotes
- Species: C. pethiyagodai

Binomial name
- Calotes pethiyagodai Amarasinghe, Karunarathna, Hallermann, Fujinuma, Grillitsch & Campbell, 2014

= Calotes pethiyagodai =

Species of lizard

The Pethiyagoda's crestless lizard (Calotes pethiyagodai) is an agamid lizard endemic to Sri Lanka. Locally known as පෙතියාගොඩගේ නොසිලු කටුස්සා (Pethiyagodage nosilu katussa).

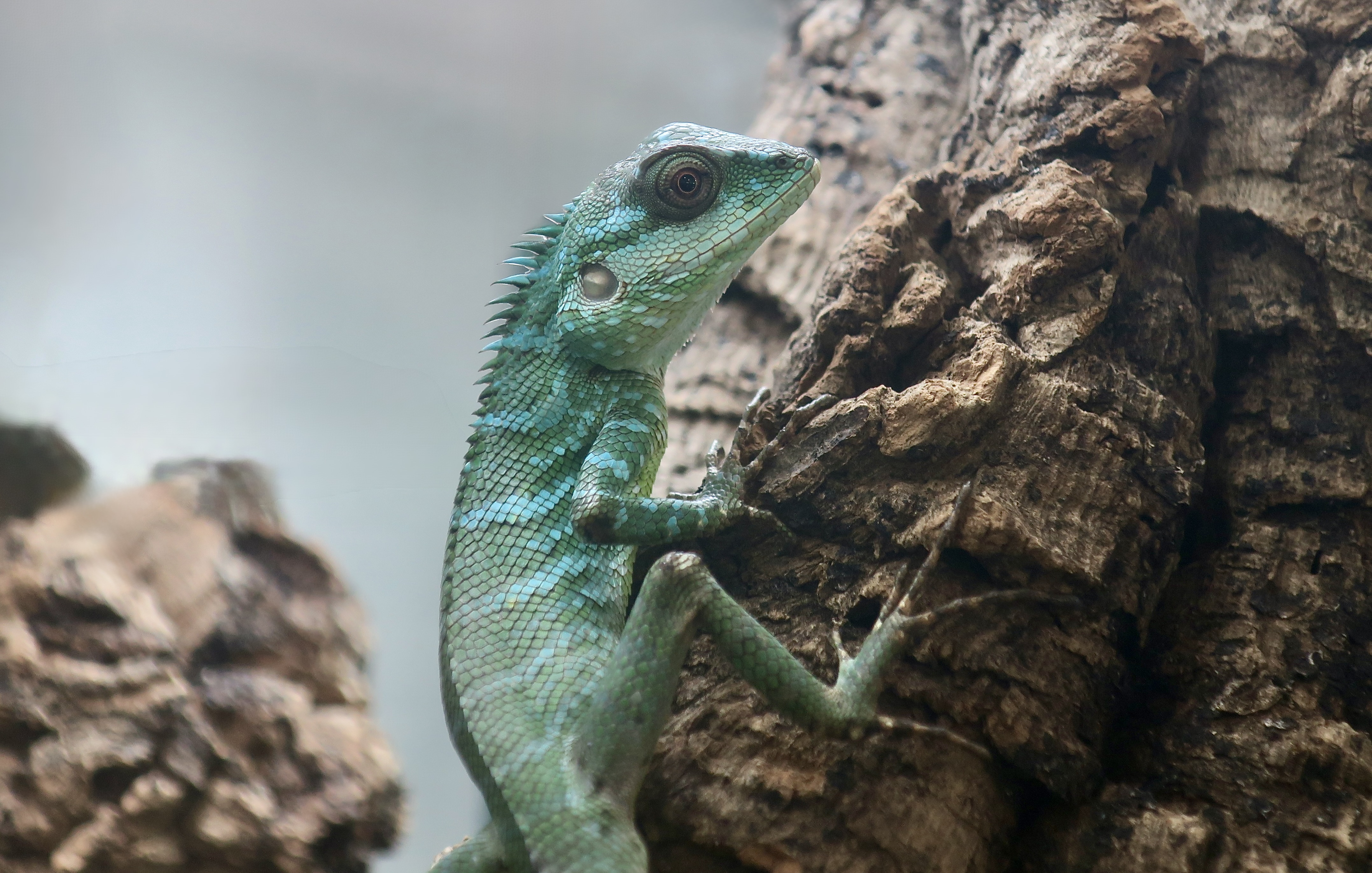
A male Pethiyagoda's crestless lizard at The Gecko Gallery NYC.

== Description ==
Researchers named the species "Pethiyagoda's crestless lizard" to honor Rohan Pethiyagoda for his contributions to the biodiversity of Sri Lanka. This species has earlier been misidentified as Calotes liocephalus but researchers found that the males of C. pethiyagodai lack a gular pouch unlike the males of C. liocephalus; scalation is also different.

== Distribution ==
The lizard is restricted to the Knuckles Mountain Range, at elevations of 900–1,400 m (3,000–4,600 ft) asl. It inhabits forest edges and is found in trees and shrubs.

== Diet ==
Diet consists of insects like dragonflies and moths.
