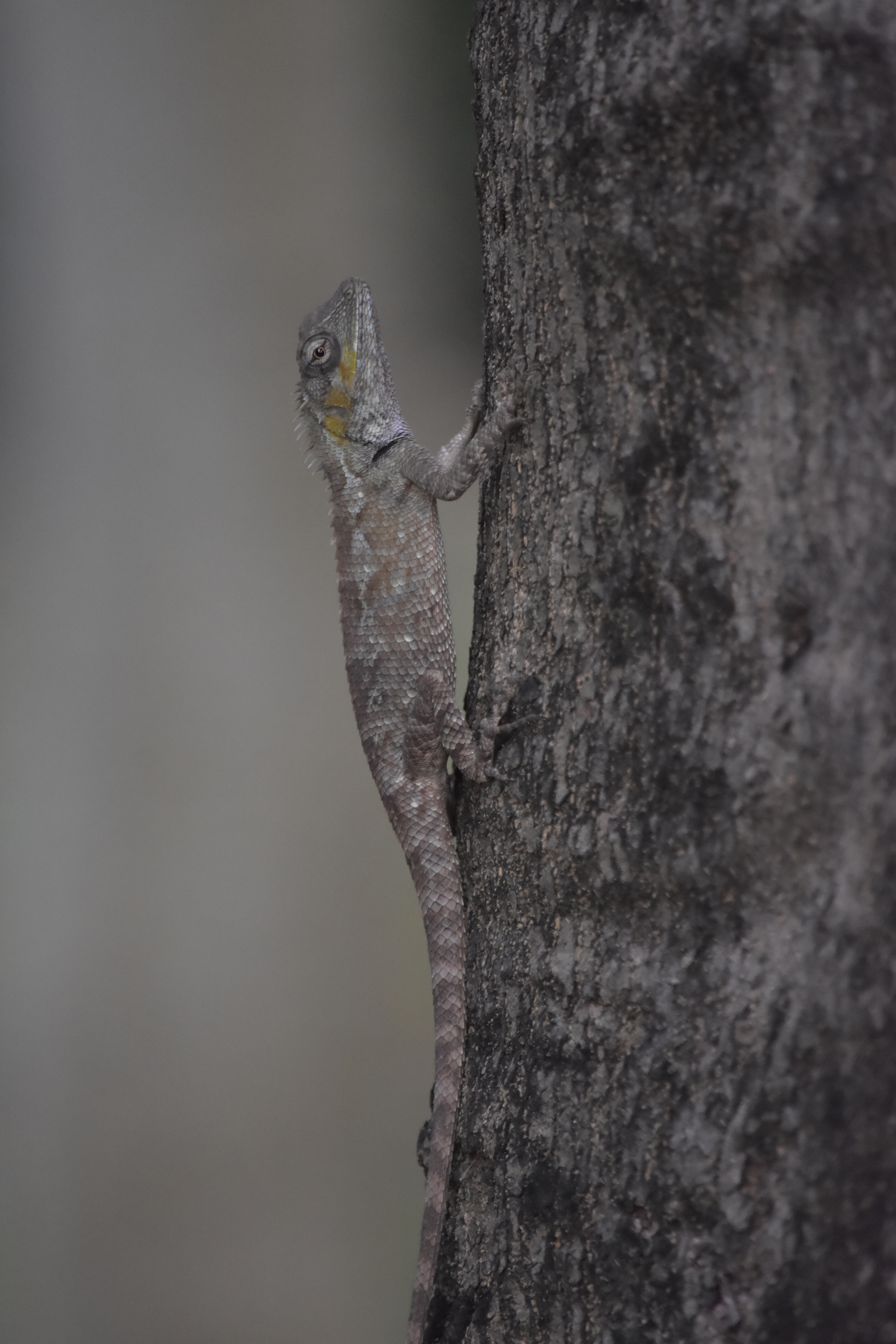
- Adult in Hoang Van Thu park, Ho Chi Minh City

Conservation status
- Least Concern (IUCN 3.1)

Scientific classification
- Kingdom: Animalia
- Phylum: Chordata
- Class: Reptilia
- Order: Squamata
- Suborder: Iguania
- Family: Agamidae
- Genus: Calotes
- Species: C. bachae

Binomial name
- Calotes bachae Hartmann, Geissler, Poyarkov, Ihlow, Galoyan, Rödder, & Böhme, 2013

= Calotes bachae =

Species of lizard

Calotes bachae, the Cochinchina lizard, is a species of lizards in the family Agamidae. It is known from southern Vietnam and eastern Cambodia. Its range may extend into southern Laos.

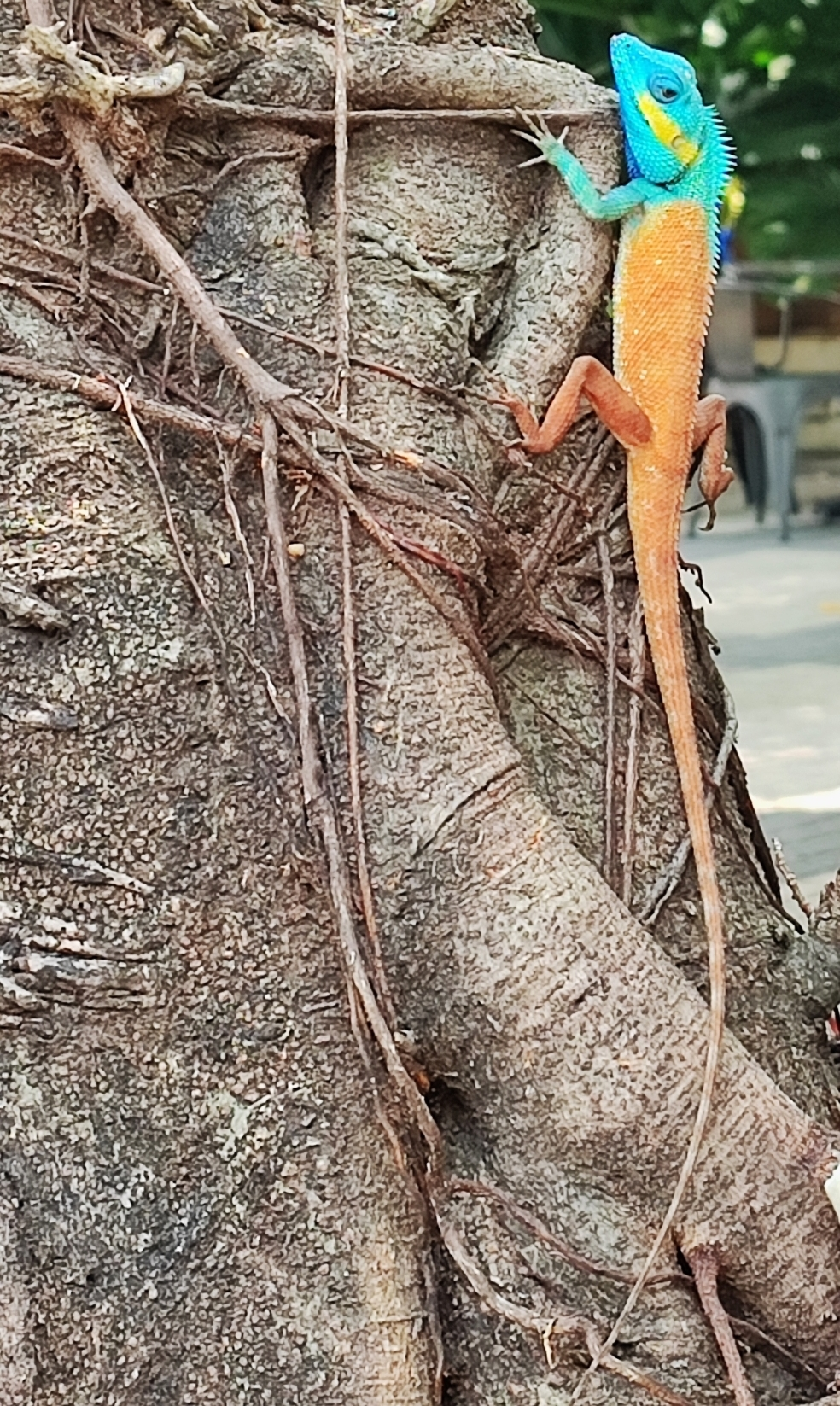
Adult male.

This species is found in open areas of Cat Tien National Park, in dense tropical forests in Bu Gia Map National Park and in parks in downtown Ho Chi Minh City. It was formerly thought that Calotes bachae was Calotes mystaceus which inhabits in Burma and Thailand due to their similar appearance. However, genetic analysis and studying the size and scale characteristics have shown that they are separate species. The result of study was published in an article on Zootaxa in January 2013.
