= Calotes vindumbarbatus =

Scientific classification
- Kingdom: Animalia
- Phylum: Chordata
- Class: Reptilia
- Order: Squamata
- Suborder: Iguania
- Family: Agamidae
- Genus: Calotes
- Species: C. vindumbarbatus

Binomial name
- Calotes vindumbarbatus Wagner, Ihlow, Hartmann, Flecks, Schmitz, & Böhme, 2021

Species of lizard

Calotes vindumbarbatus is a species of agamid lizard. It is found in Myanmar.
