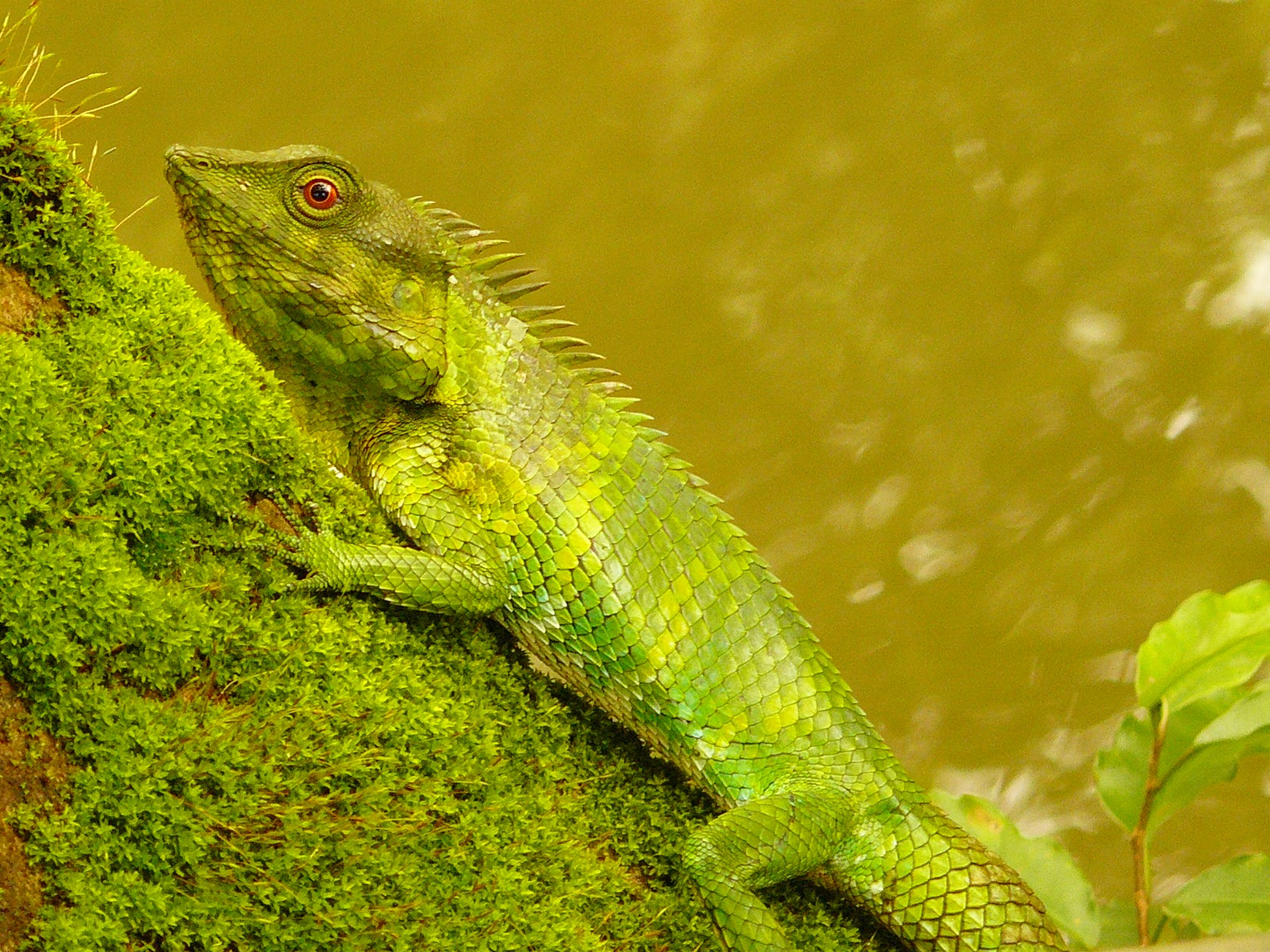
- C. nemoricola from Pookode Lake, Wayanad
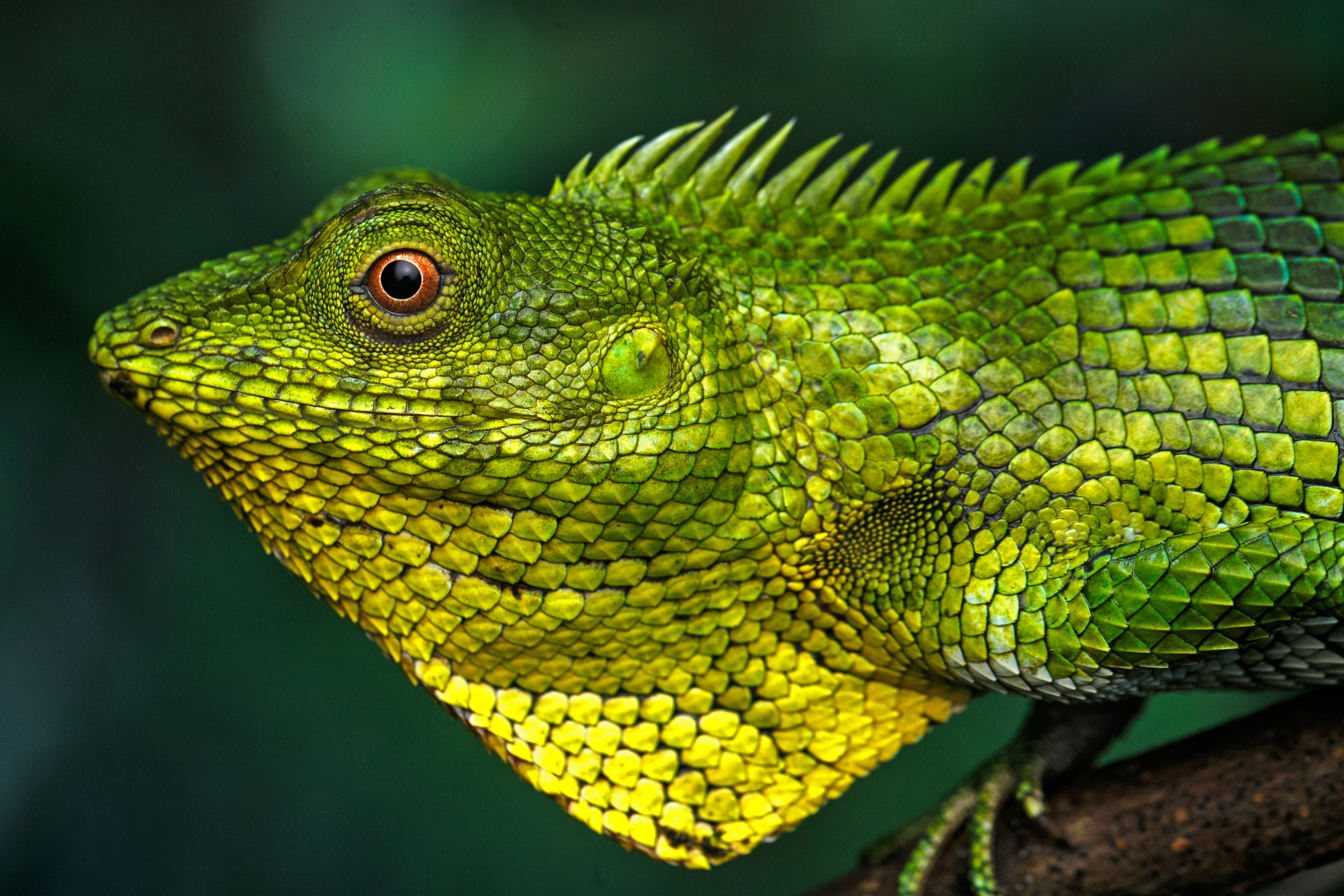
- Calotes nemoricola

Conservation status
- Least Concern (IUCN 3.1)

Scientific classification
- Kingdom: Animalia
- Phylum: Chordata
- Class: Reptilia
- Order: Squamata
- Suborder: Iguania
- Family: Agamidae
- Genus: Calotes
- Species: C. nemoricola

Binomial name
- Calotes nemoricola Jerdon, 1853

= Calotes nemoricola =

Species of lizard

Calotes nemoricola, the Nilgiri forest lizard, is an agamid lizard found in the Western Ghats of India (Nilgiri Hills, Anaimalai, Kalakkad Mundanthurai Tiger Reserve, Coorg, Agumbe).

== Description ==
One detached spine in front of three or two small ones on each side of the nape; a fold of the skin before the shoulder. Scales of the sides very large, not keeled; those of the abdomen much smaller, keeled. Dorsal crest extending only about one-third along the back; where the dorsal crest terminates, the scales of the ridge arc pointed. The scales at the base of the tail above arc of rather large size. Green. These characters have been noted by Jerdon from a single specimen obtained near the foot of the Coonoor ghat of the Nilgherries. It was 18 inches long.

From C. A. L. Gunther (1864), The Reptiles of British India.

- Length of head one and a half times its breadth;
- snout distinctly longer than the orbit;
- forehead concave;
- upper head-scales unequal,
- smooth or feebly keeled;
- Canthus rostralis and supraciliary edge sharp;
- a row of 3 or 4 compressed spines above the posterior part of the tympanum, the diameter of which is less than half that of the orbit;
- 9 or 10 upper and as many lower labials. Body compressed; dorsal scales very large, about three times as large as the median ventrals, smooth, pointing backwards and upwards;
- ventrals strongly keeled;
- 36 to 43 scales round the middle of the body;
- gular sac: small;
- scales on either side of the lower jaw feebly keeled, larger than the ventrals, those on the gular pouch smaller, more strongly keeled about as large as the ventrals. A short oblique fold or pit in front of the shoulder covered with small granular scales. Nuchal and dorsal crests continuous, the former well developed, composed of about 12 lanceolate spines, the longest of which is nearly as long as the orbit:
- on the back the crest is much lower. Limbs moderate;
- third and fourth fingers nearly equal;
- fourth toe a little longer than the third;
- the hind limb reaches to the tympanum or not quite so far. Tail feebly compressed, covered with subequal, keeled scales;
- in the fully grown male the base is swollen and the scales on that part of it are thickened. Green or brownish above, with indistinct darker markings; green or brownish above, with indistinct darker markings;
- a black streak from the eye to above the tympanum; throat with black streaks;
- belly: dirty white; gular pouch: pink (in life).
