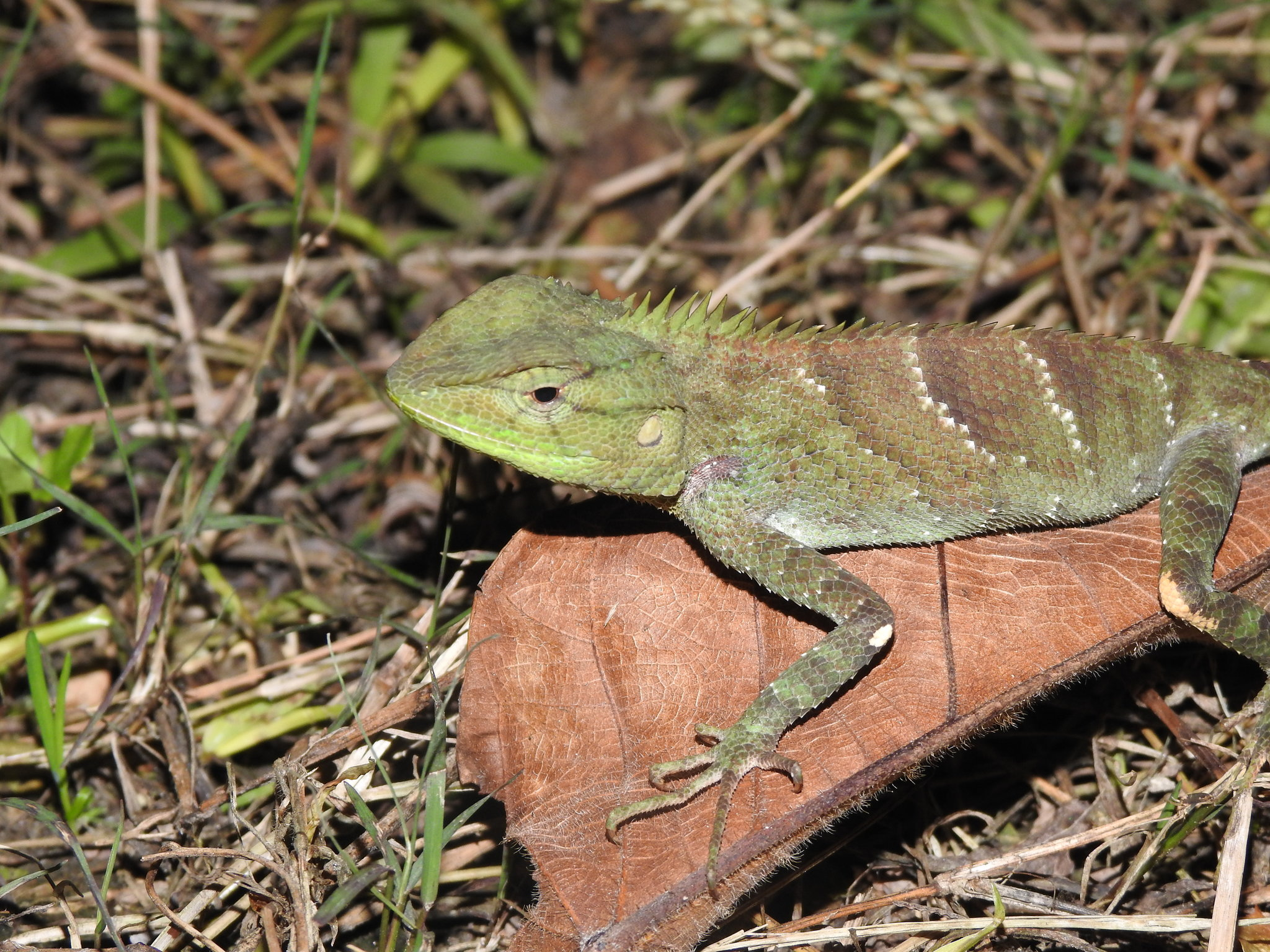

Conservation status
- Least Concern (IUCN 3.1)

Scientific classification
- Kingdom: Animalia
- Phylum: Chordata
- Class: Reptilia
- Order: Squamata
- Suborder: Iguania
- Family: Agamidae
- Genus: Calotes
- Species: C. medogensis

Binomial name
- Calotes medogensis Zhao & Li, 1984
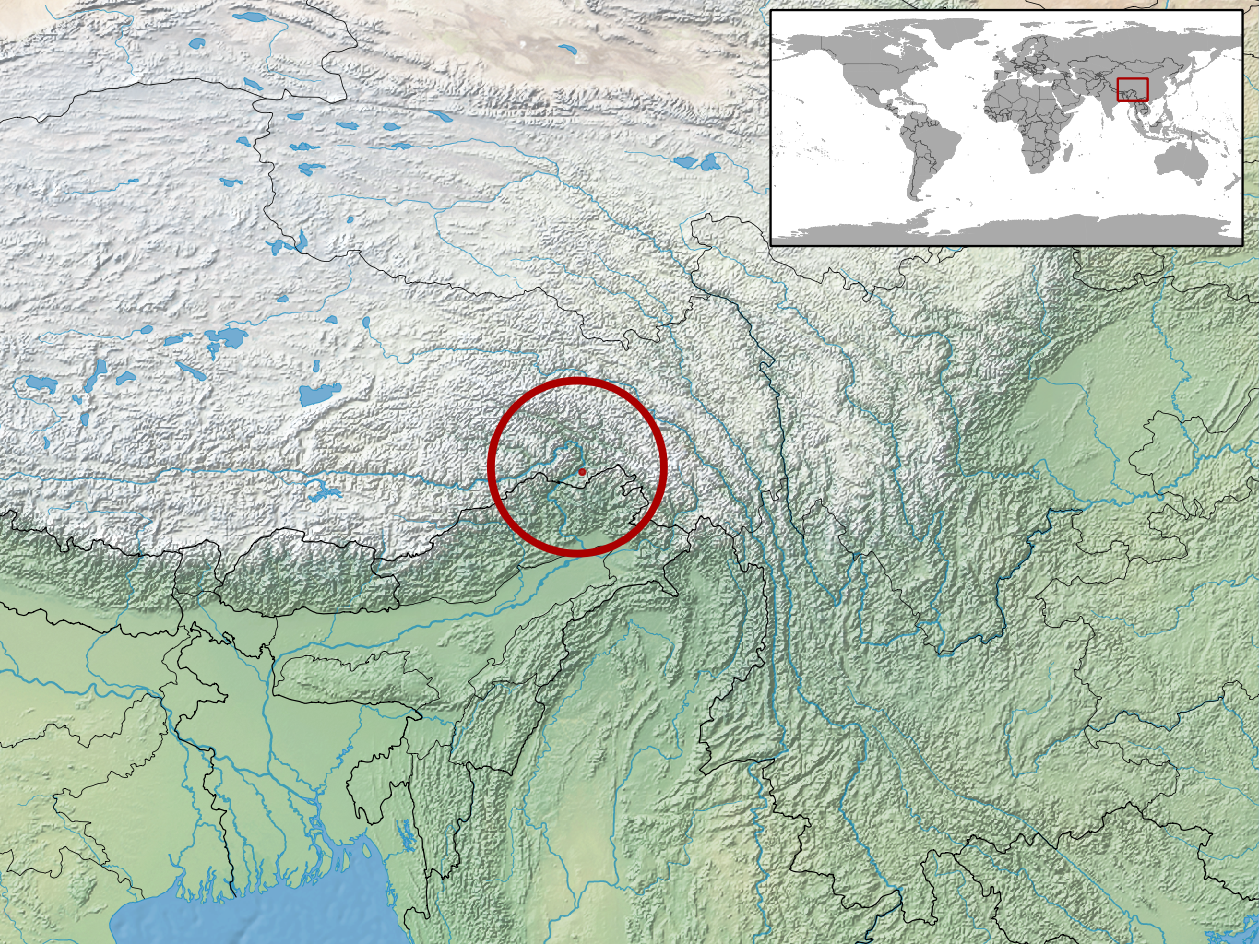

= Calotes medogensis =

Species of lizard

Calotes medogensis, the Medog bloodsucker, is a species of agamid lizard. It is endemic to Medog County of Tibet (China).
