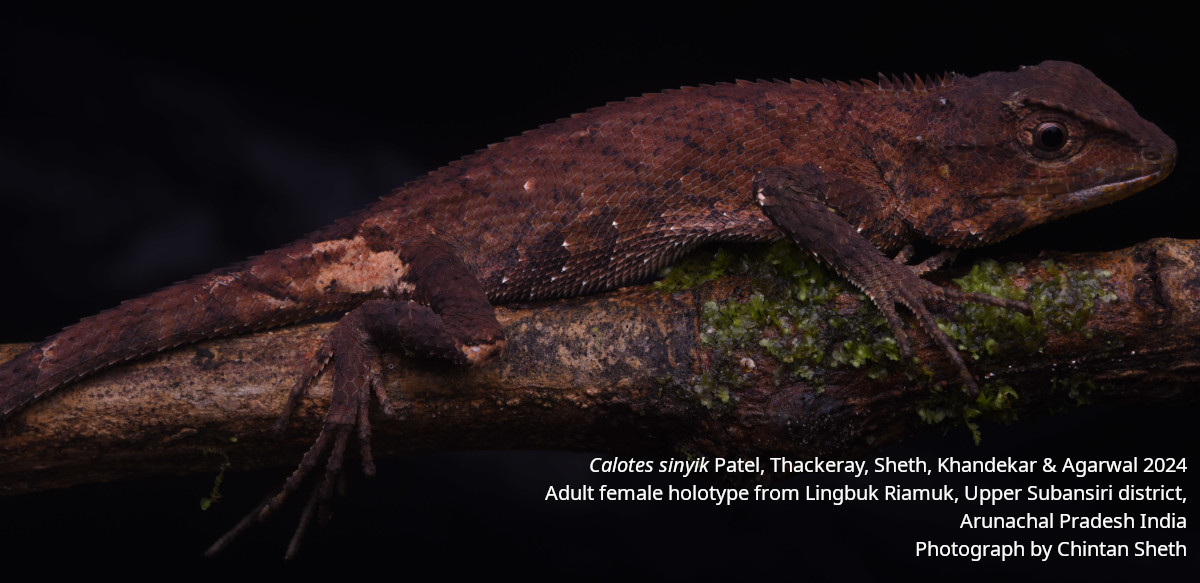
- Adult female holotype of Subansiri dragon lizard Calotes sinyik

Scientific classification
- Kingdom: Animalia
- Phylum: Chordata
- Class: Reptilia
- Order: Squamata
- Suborder: Iguania
- Family: Agamidae
- Genus: Calotes
- Species: C. sinyik

Binomial name
- Calotes sinyik Patel, Thackeray, Sheth, Khandekar, & Agarwal, 2024

= Calotes sinyik =

Species of lizard

Calotes sinyik, the Sinyik dragon lizard or Subansiri dragon lizard, is a species of lizard found in Arunachal Pradesh, India. Once it has matured into an adult, the lizard is said to be able to change colour. It reaches about 8.5 inches (21.59 cm) in length.

== Description ==
The lizard has a long, broad head with a short snout and large eyes. The limbs are long, with slender fingers ending in a strong, slightly curved claw.

== Etymology ==
The specific epithet is the local name of the Subansiri River in the Tagin language, used as a noun in apposition. The Tagin are one of the major tribes of Arunachal Pradesh and mainly inhabit Upper Subansiri District. Suggested common name is Sinyik or Subansiri dragon lizard. Agamids are commonly referred to as /sopin/ in Tagin.
