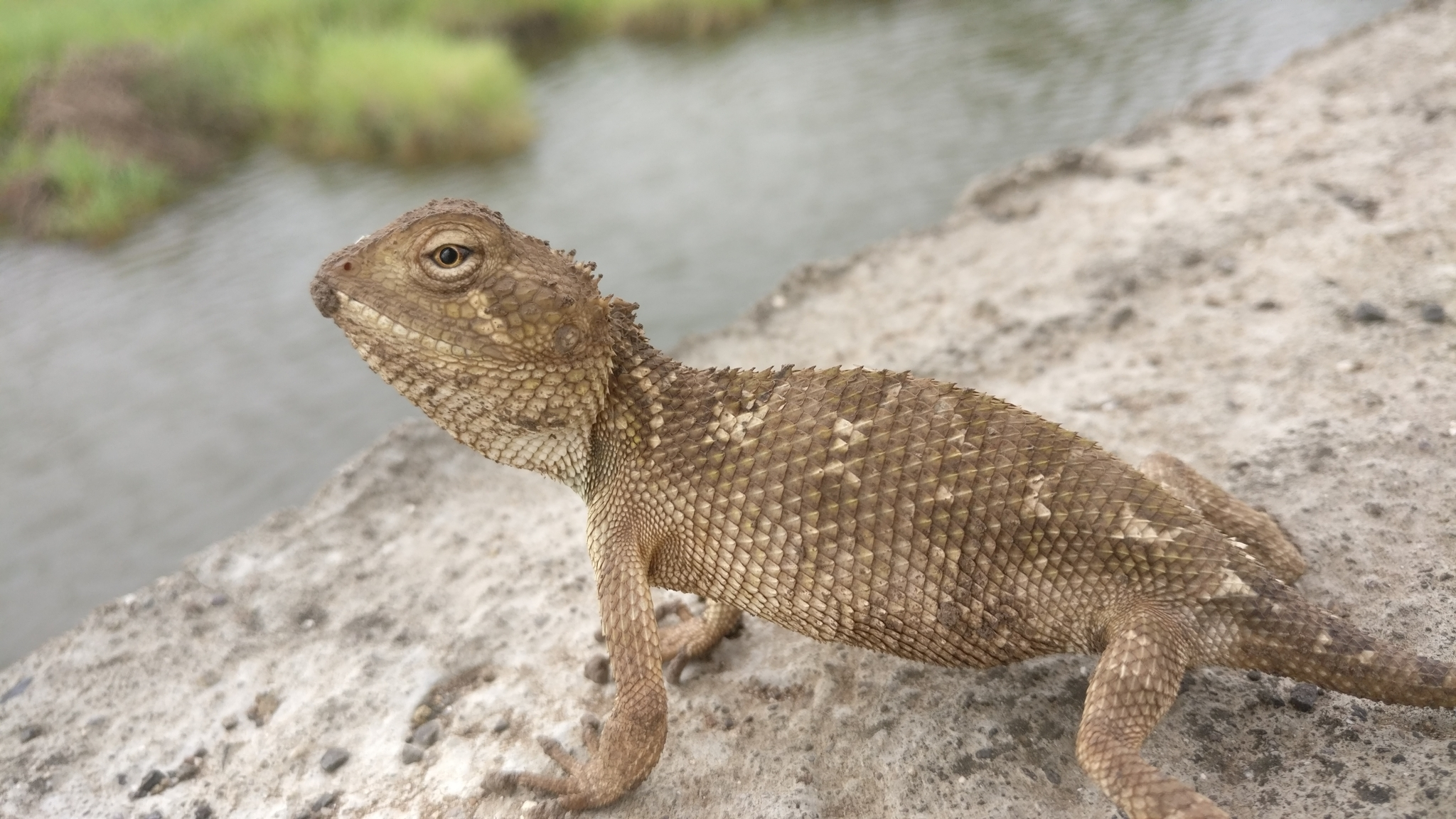

Conservation status
- Least Concern (IUCN 3.1)

Scientific classification
- Kingdom: Animalia
- Phylum: Chordata
- Class: Reptilia
- Order: Squamata
- Suborder: Iguania
- Family: Agamidae
- Genus: Calotes
- Species: C. minor

Binomial name
- Calotes minor (Hardwicke & Gray, 1827)
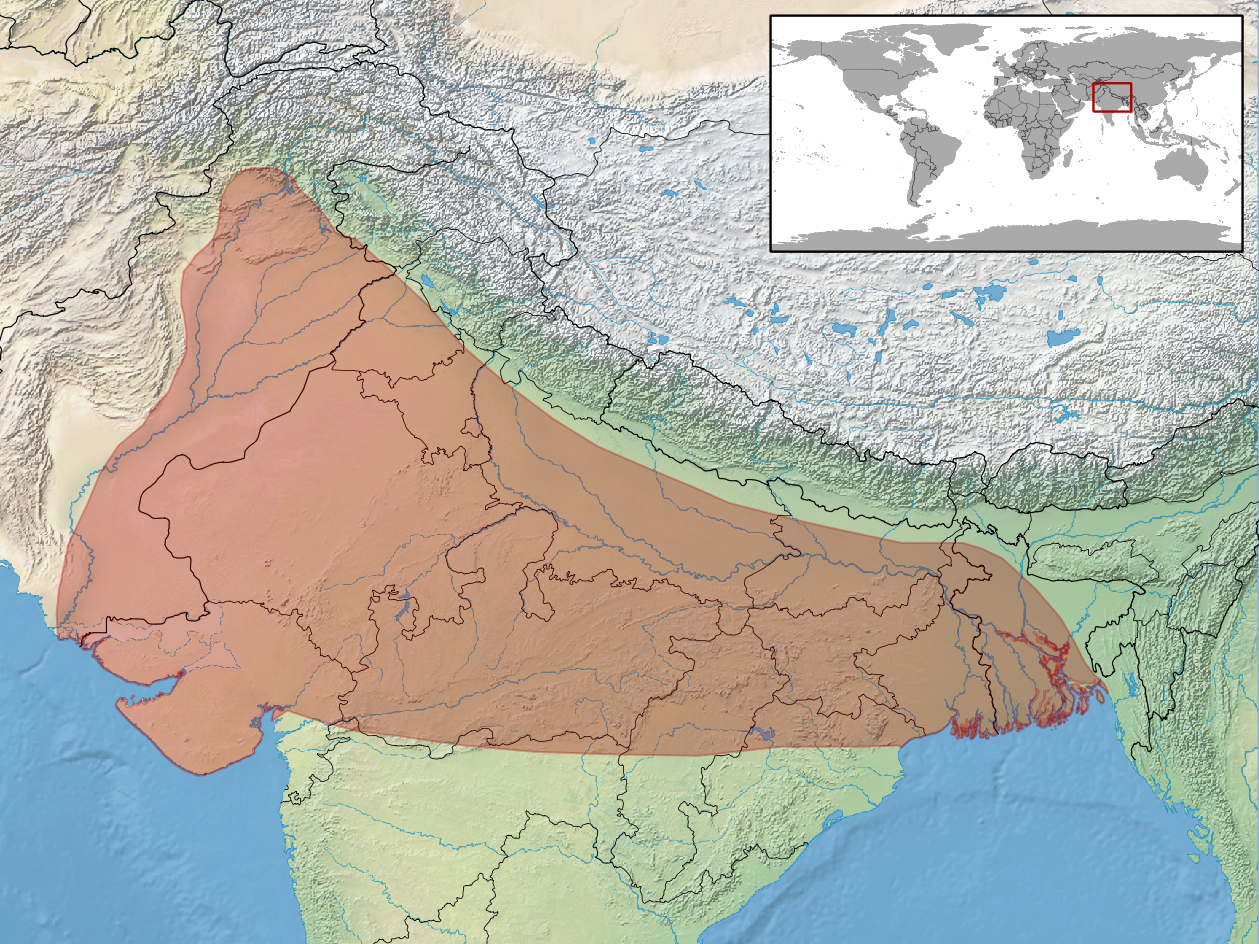

Synonyms
- Agama minor Hardwicke & Gray, 1827; Brachysaura minor (Hardwicke & Gray, 1827); Laudakia minor (Hardwicke & Gray, 1827); Brachysaura ornata Blyth, 1856; Charasia ornata (Blyth, 1856)

= Hardwicke's bloodsucker =

Species of lizard

Hardwicke's bloodsucker (Calotes minor), also known commonly as the dwarf rock agama and the lesser agama, is a species of lizard in the subfamily Draconinae of the family Agamidae. The species is native to South Asia.

== Morphology ==
Physical structure: Calotes minor is a small stocky and pot-belly lizard with a short tail. Its head is large and elongated, flat above, and sloping towards the snout. The dorsal scales are large, strongly imbricate, and keeled, pointing backward and upward. The ventral scales are smaller than the dorsal scales. The upper head scales are large, unequal, and strongly keeled or tubercular. Females are larger than males.

Color pattern: The dorsal color is olive brown with three rows of dark brown, light-edged spots on the body and the base of the tail. The spots of the middle row are most prominent and rhomboidal. On each side of the neck there is a white streak which is bifurcated posteriorly. Also, there is an oblique white streak from the eye to the corner of mouth. The limbs have dark brown crossbars. The throat is profusely spotted with dark brown and orange. The belly is yellowish white, with numerous orange dots. The olor inside the mouth is ink blue. Females are more brilliantly colored during the breeding season.

Length: The maximum recorded total length (tail included) is 18 cm (7.1 in), but most specimens have a total length of about 10 cm (3.9 in) and a snout-to-vent length (SVL) of about 6 cm (2.4 in).

== Geographic distribution ==
Calotes minor is found in Bangladesh (southeast part of the country), India (Madhya Pradesh, Uttar Pradesh, Rajasthan, Gujarat, Odissa) and Pakistan (Sindh).

== Habitat ==
The preferred natural habitat of Calotes minor is fragmented dry forest, arid environments, barren desert, and desolate areas, at elevations of 50–500 m (160–1,640 ft), across the Indo-Gangetic Plain.

== Behavior ==
Calotes minor is terrestrial, diurnal, and crepuscular. It shelters in burrows close to the roots of thorny bushes. Generally it is found sitting on stones, but it can climb up shrubby vegetation. It is sluggish in movements, often not attempting to escape when approached. It is a docile species.

== Diet ==
Calotes minor is mainly insectivorous, preying on grasshoppers and their nymphs, earwigs, beetles, bugs, arthropods, and spiders. Sometimes it also eats flowers.

== Reproduction ==
Calotes minor is oviparous. The breeding season extends from April to June. The female lays four to six hard shelled white eggs in burrows under the roots of vegetation.

== Importance ==
Calotes minor plays a role in the eco-system by eating various types of insects and otherwise.

== Threat to humans ==
Calotes minor is non-venomous and completely harmless to humans.

== Etymology ==
The specific name, minor, is a Latin word, meaning "less" or "smaller", referring to the smaller size of this agamid.

== Conservation threat ==
Calotes minor has a reputation for being venomous, which is totally baseless and has contributed much to its depletion by humans. It is threatened by habitat loss by conversion of land to agriculture. A slow-moving lizard, it is vulnerable to predation by cats and dogs in addition to natural predators.
