= Calotes bhutanensis =

Conservation status
- Data Deficient (IUCN 3.1)

Scientific classification
- Kingdom: Animalia
- Phylum: Chordata
- Class: Reptilia
- Order: Squamata
- Suborder: Iguania
- Family: Agamidae
- Genus: Calotes
- Species: C. bhutanensis

Binomial name
- Calotes bhutanensis Biswas, 1975

Species of lizard

Calotes bhutanensis is a species of lizard in the family Agamidae. It is endemic to the mountainous regions of Bhutan.

== Description ==
Calotes bhutanensis was first described by biologist S. Biswas in 1975 through a single specimen. It was described as having frontal region in a slightly convex, fewer supra- and infralabials than other lizards in its family. Its shoulder was described to have an oblique fold in front of the shoulder. There were fewer rows of scales and most dorsal body scales were pointing backwards and downwards. It also had distinctly swollen tail base with enlarged scales in males.

The species is similar in biology and physiology to the oriental garden lizard. In a sub-adult male, the tail can grow to a length of 15 mm and the snout-vent length can reach 60 mm.

The head of the species has a length that is 50% longer than the width. On the skull are two separate spines on each side of the back of the head. From the lower jaw run four lines on the chin and throat. There are 12 upper labials and 11 lower labials. The breadth between two anterior eye corners corners more than the eye corner, and makes the lizard have the appearance of being snub-nosed or short-snouted. No gular pouch is observed but in lieu of this, the throat is inflatable, enabled by some smaller and narrower scales in the middle of the neck than the side. For protection, the neck has a row of 8 scales on the sides of the neck. On the sides of the body, there are numerous black patches that can be transverse, wavy, or variegated in pattern. They give the appearance of wavy lines. The third and fourth fingers are nearly equal in length but the fourth is longer.

== Distribution ==
C. bhutanensis is endemic to Bhutan and was named after this country. It is mainly found near the Manas River. Calotes bhutanensis is generally restricted in habitat to their locality, that is an area of no more than 10 kilometers squared.
