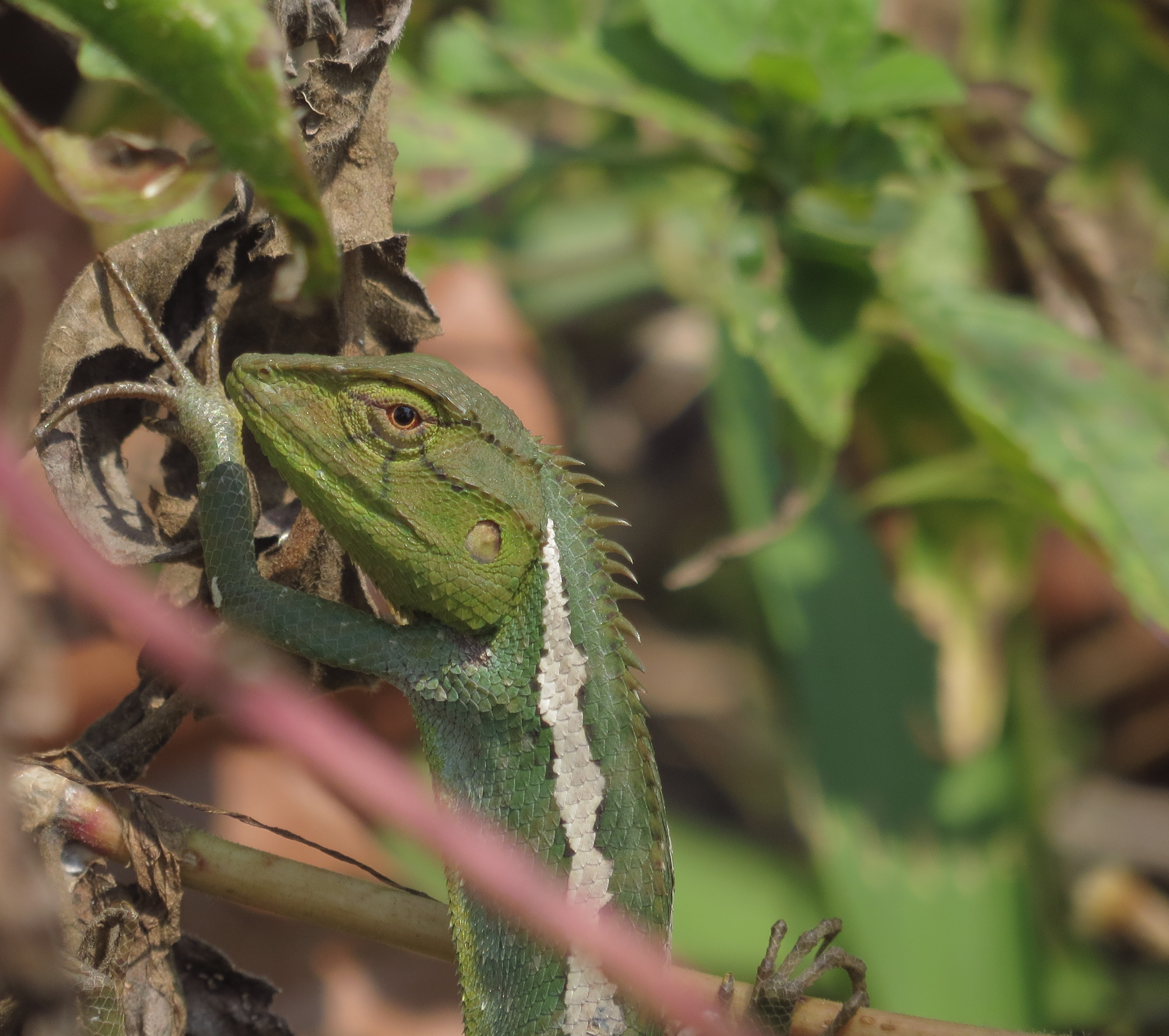

Conservation status
- Least Concern (IUCN 3.1)

Scientific classification
- Kingdom: Animalia
- Phylum: Chordata
- Class: Reptilia
- Order: Squamata
- Suborder: Iguania
- Family: Agamidae
- Genus: Calotes
- Species: C. jerdoni

Binomial name
- Calotes jerdoni Günther, 1870

= Calotes jerdoni =

Species of lizard

Calotes jerdoni, commonly known as the Indo-Chinese forest lizard or Jerdon's forest lizard, is a species of lizard in the family Agamidae. The species is endemic to China and South Asia.

== Etymology ==
The specific name, jerdoni, is in honor of British biologist Thomas C. Jerdon. Common names include green forest lizard, green garden lizard, Indochinese forest lizard and Jerdon's forest lizard.

== Description/Identification ==
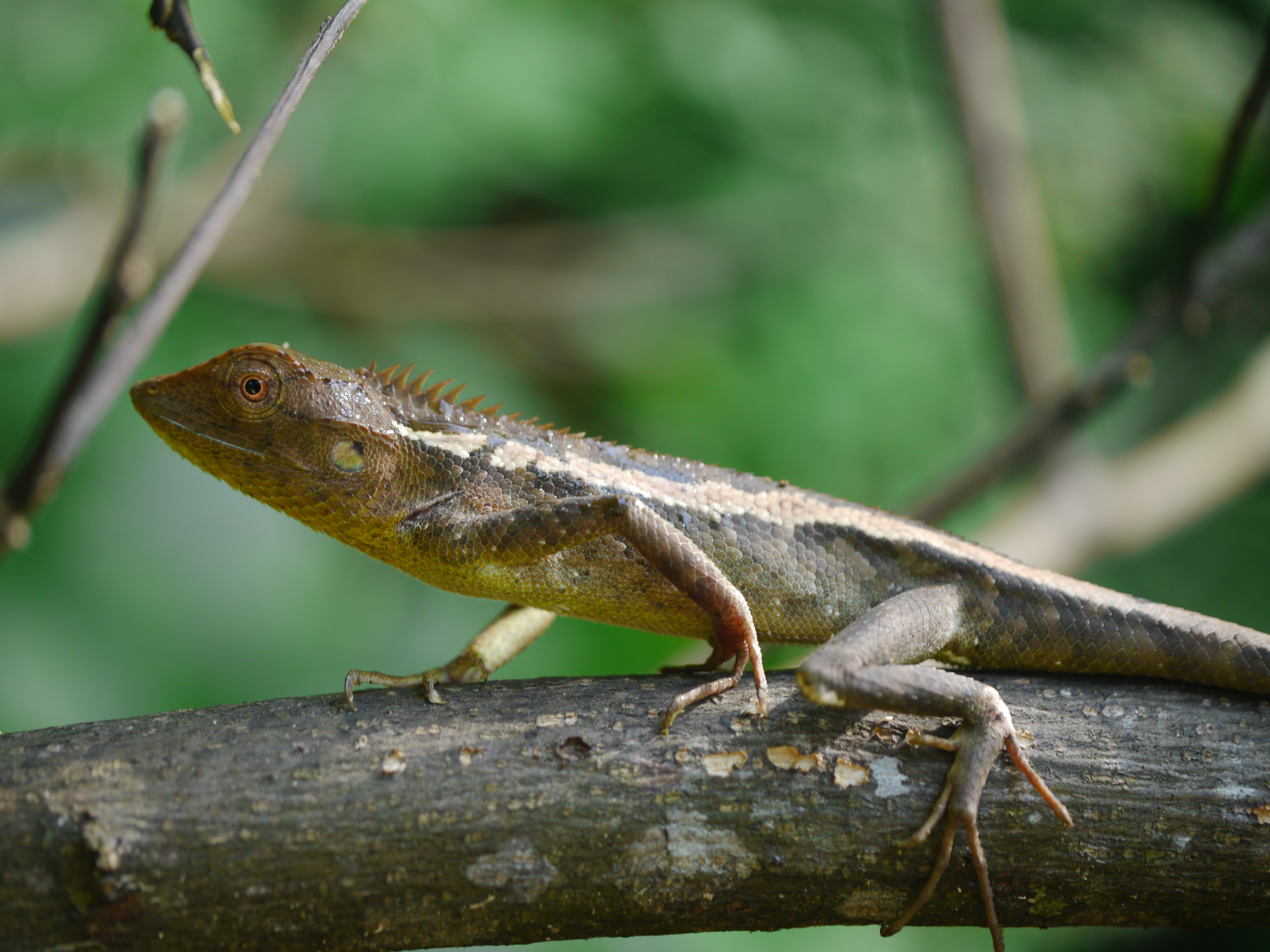
C. jerdoni

Physical structure: A compressed-bodied lizard. This species resembles Calotes maria in pholidotic (scale) and other characters except that it has 45-57 scales round the body; gular scales much larger than the ventral scales; there is an oblique curved fold covered with small granular scales in front of the shoulders; nuchal crest less prominent; the hind-limb reaches to the eye or not quite so far. Dorsal and lateral scales directed upward.

Color pattern: Deep-green dorsal coloration with yellow, orange or brown spots, but in many cases can make the body into a dark brown within a few seconds.

Length: Maximum total length (including tail): 38.5 cm (15.2 in). Common total length: 32 cm (13 in). Common snout-to-vent length (SVL) : 9 cm (3.5 in).

== Distribution and habitat ==
Bangladesh, Bhutan, China (W Yunnan, Xizang = Tibet), India (Khasi Hills in Assam & Shillong) and Myanmar.

Terrestrial & arboreal; diurnal; found in many types of forested land. Prefers dense and bushy hill forest. A skillful and an adept climber, it moves over trees and bushes rather swiftly. It is active during the day time.

== Diet ==
Insectivorous; feeds largely on insects but at times bird-eggs, nestlings, and frogs too are eaten up.

== Reproduction ==
Oviparous; breeding season begins around April when males develop bright coloration in the forebody and begin to chase females. Female digs a small hollow in soft earth and lays 11-23 eggs in it for incubation and safety.

== Threat to humans ==
Non-venomous and completely harmless to humans.
