= Calotes htunwini =

Conservation status
- Least Concern (IUCN 3.1)

Scientific classification
- Kingdom: Animalia
- Phylum: Chordata
- Class: Reptilia
- Order: Squamata
- Suborder: Iguania
- Family: Agamidae
- Genus: Calotes
- Species: C. htunwini

Binomial name
- Calotes htunwini Zug & Vindum, 2006

Species of lizard

Calotes htunwini is a species of lizard in the family Agamidae. The species is endemic to Myanmar.

== Etymology ==
The specific name, htunwini, is in honor of Myanma herpetologist Htun Win.

== Habitat ==
The preferred natural habitats of C. htunwini are forest and shrubland.

== Description ==
C. htunwini has an average snout-to-vent length (SVL) of 7.5 cm (3.0 in).

== Reproduction ==
C. htunwini is oviparous.
