= Calotes geissleri =

Scientific classification
- Kingdom: Animalia
- Phylum: Chordata
- Class: Reptilia
- Order: Squamata
- Suborder: Iguania
- Family: Agamidae
- Genus: Calotes
- Species: C. geissleri

Binomial name
- Calotes geissleri Wagner, Ihlow, Hartmann, Flecks, Schmitz, & Böhme, 2021

Species of lizard

Calotes geissleri is a species of agamid lizard. It is found in Myanmar and India. It is named after Peter Geißler from the Museum Natur und Mensch Freiburg (Germany).

Males grow to 122 mm (4.8 in) and females to 114 mm (4.5 in) in snout–vent length.
