= Calotes chincollium =

Conservation status
- Least Concern (IUCN 3.1)

Scientific classification
- Kingdom: Animalia
- Phylum: Chordata
- Class: Reptilia
- Order: Squamata
- Suborder: Iguania
- Family: Agamidae
- Genus: Calotes
- Species: C. chincollium

Binomial name
- Calotes chincollium Vindum, 2003

Species of lizard

Calotes chincollium is a species of agamid lizard. It is endemic to Myanmar.

Calotes chincollium occurs in areas of shifting cultivation and secondary forest but not in primary forest. Its elevational range is 730–1,940 m (2,400–6,360 ft) above sea level. It is primarily terrestrial but may also climb onto the base of trees.
