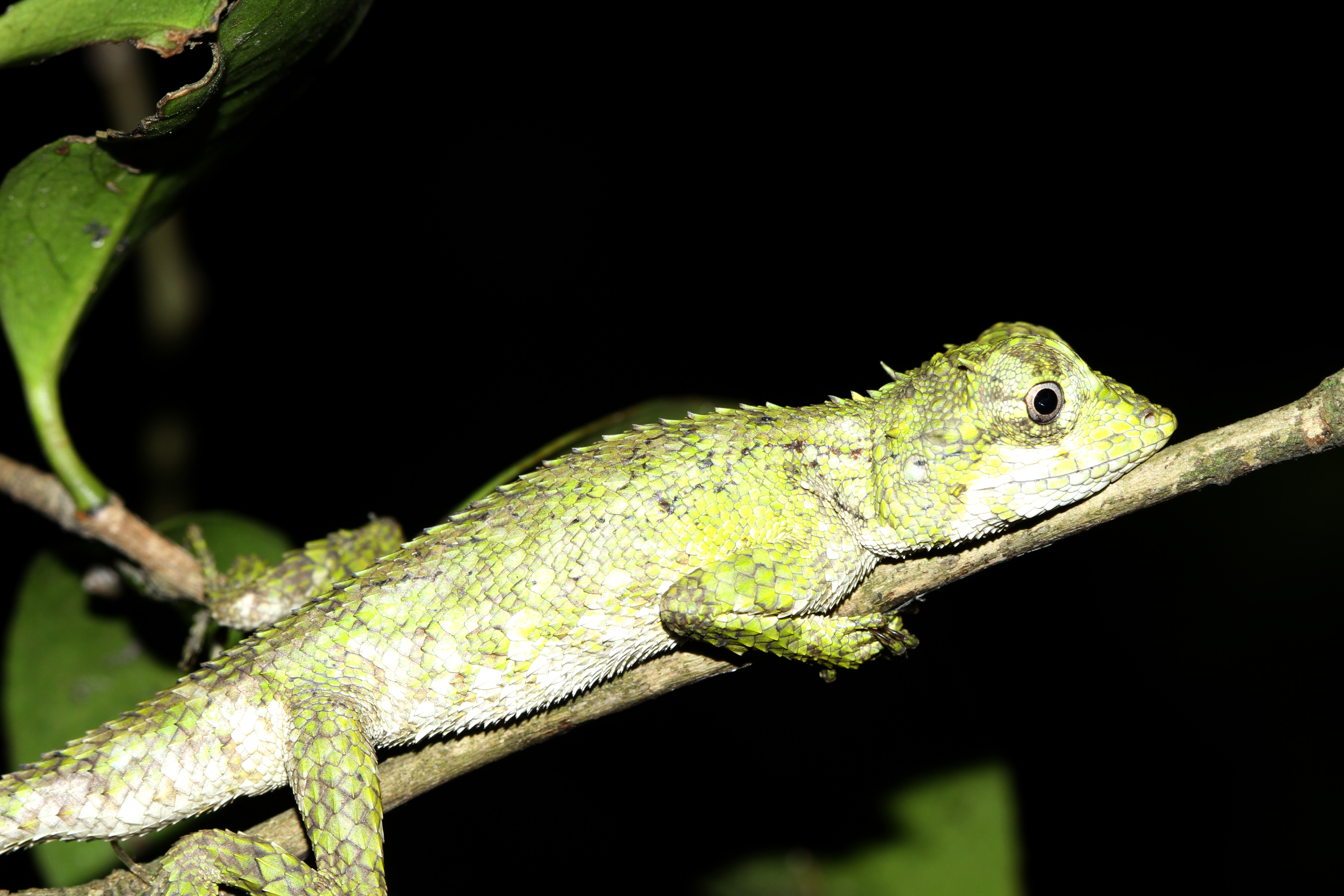
- Calotes paulus, Meghalaya

Scientific classification
- Domain: Eukaryota
- Kingdom: Animalia
- Phylum: Chordata
- Class: Reptilia
- Order: Squamata
- Suborder: Iguania
- Family: Agamidae
- Genus: Calotes
- Species: C. paulus

Binomial name
- Calotes paulus (Smith, 1935)

Synonyms
- Calotes minor (Gray, 1845); Oriocalotes minor (Günther, 1864); Acanthosaura minor (Boulenger, 1885); Oriocalotes paulus Smith, 1935

= Small forest lizard =

Species of lizard

The small forest lizard (Calotes paulus) is a species of agamid lizard found in India (eastern Himalaya, Khasi Hills, Sikkim, and China (Tibet).
