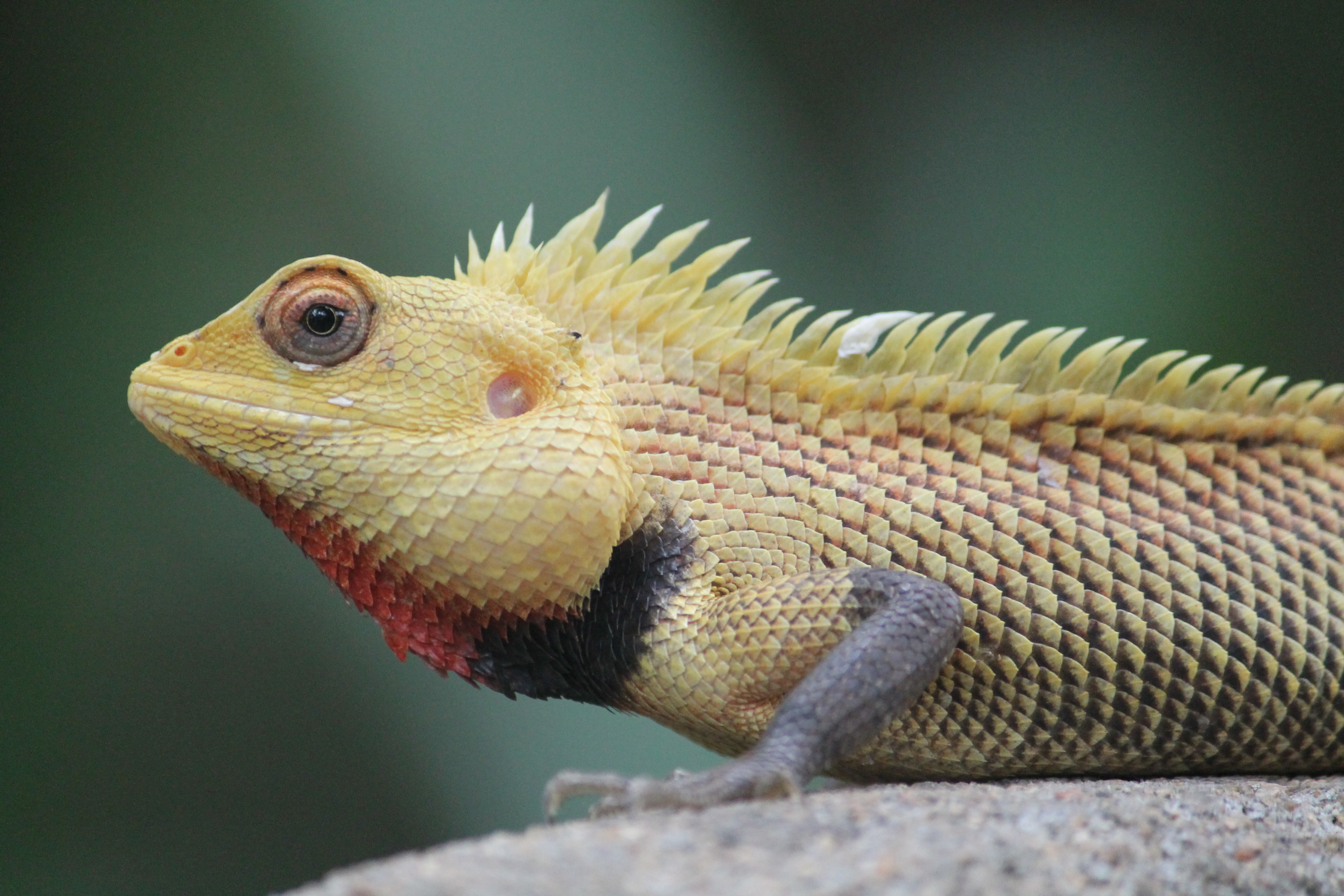
- C. versicolor, male

Scientific classification
- Kingdom: Animalia
- Phylum: Chordata
- Class: Reptilia
- Order: Squamata
- Suborder: Iguania
- Family: Agamidae
- Subfamily: Draconinae
- Genus: Calotes; Cuvier, 1817

Species
- 29 species, see here

= Calotes =

Genus of lizards

Calotes is a genus of lizards in the draconine clade of the family Agamidae. The genus contains 29 species. Some species are known as forest lizards, others as "bloodsuckers" due to their red heads, and yet others (namely C. versicolor) as garden lizards. The genus name Calotes has been derived from the Greek word Καλότης (Kalótës), meaning ‘beauty’, referring to the beautiful pattern of this genus.

== Geographic range ==
Species in the genus Calotes are native to South Asia, southern China, mainland Southeast Asia and Ambon. Additionally, C. versicolor has been introduced to Florida (USA), Borneo, Sulawesi, the Seychelles, Mauritius and Oman. The greatest species richness of the genus is from the Western Ghats, northeast India, Myanmar, Bangladesh and Sri Lanka.

== Description ==
Calotes is distinguished from related genera in having uniform-sized dorsal scales, and lacking a fold of skin extending between the cheek and shoulder, and in having proportionately stronger limbs than Pseudocalotes. Compared to Bronchocela, Calotes have a proportionately shorter tail and limbs. Calotes as we know it today was classified by Moody (1980) prior to which all of the above-mentioned genera were included in this genus.

== Taxonomy ==
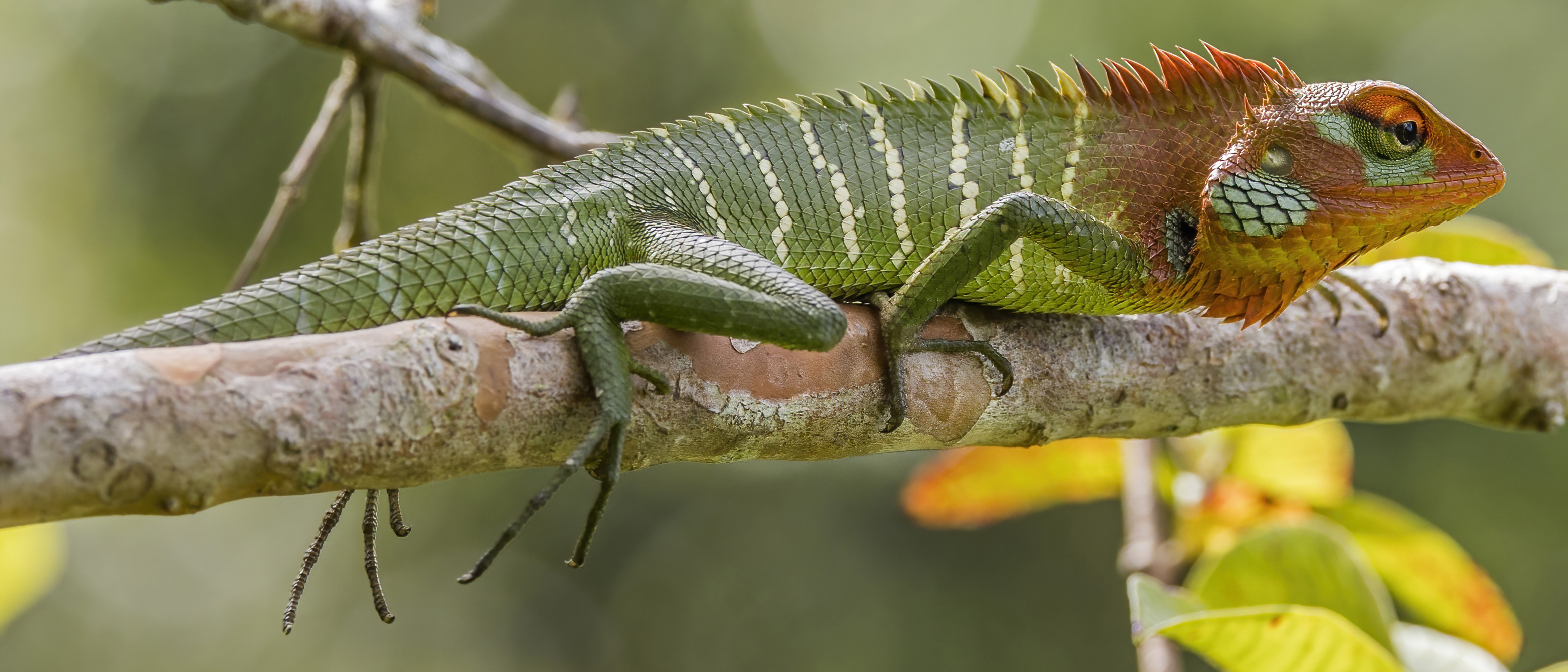
C. calotes male.

The genus Calotes is still a heterogeneous group that may be divided into the C. versicolor and C. liocephalus groups. The former occurs through most of South Asia and further east. All species in this group have their dorsal and lateral scales directed upward. The latter is restricted to the southern Western Ghats and Sri Lanka. All species in this group have their scales directed back, or up and down, or down only. Whether further splitting is necessary or whether the groups constitute subgenera of a monophyletic Calotes remains to be studied.

== Species ==
Listed alphabetically by specific name.

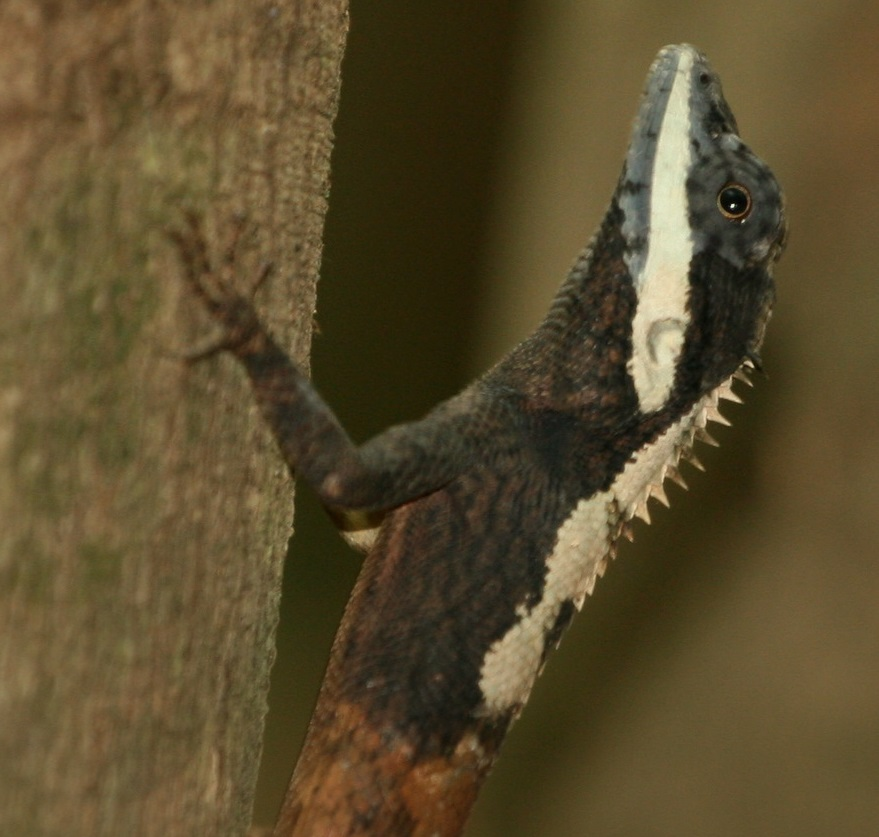
- C. ceylonensis
  Calotes bachae Hartmann et al., 2013
- Calotes bhutanensis Biswas, 1975
- Calotes calotes (Linnaeus, 1758) – common green forest lizard
- Calotes ceylonensis (F. Müller, 1887) – painted-lip lizard, Ceylon bloodsucker
- Calotes chincollium Vindum, 2003
- Calotes desilvai Bahir & Maduwage, 2005 - Morningside lizard, Ceylon black-band whistling lizard
- Calotes emma Gray, 1845 – Emma Gray's forest lizard, forest crested lizard
  - Calotes emma alticristatus K.P. Schmidt, 1925
  - Calotes emma emma Gray, 1845
- Calotes farooqi Auffenberg & Rehman, 1995 – Farooq's garden lizard
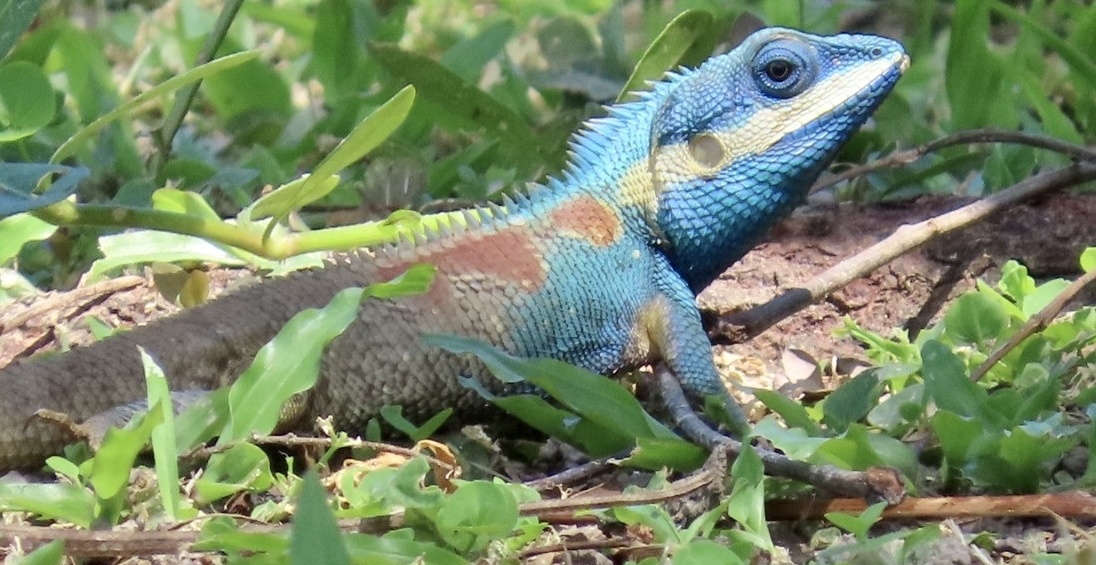
  C. mystaceus
- Calotes geissleri Wagner, Ihlow, Hartmann, Flecks, Schmitz & Böhme, 2021
- Calotes goetzi Wagner, Ihlow, Hartmann, Flecks, Schmitz & Böhme, 2021
- Calotes grandisquamis Günther, 1864 – large-scaled forest lizard
- Calotes htunwini Zug & Vindum, 2006
- Calotes irawadi Zug, Brown, Schulte & Vindum, 2006
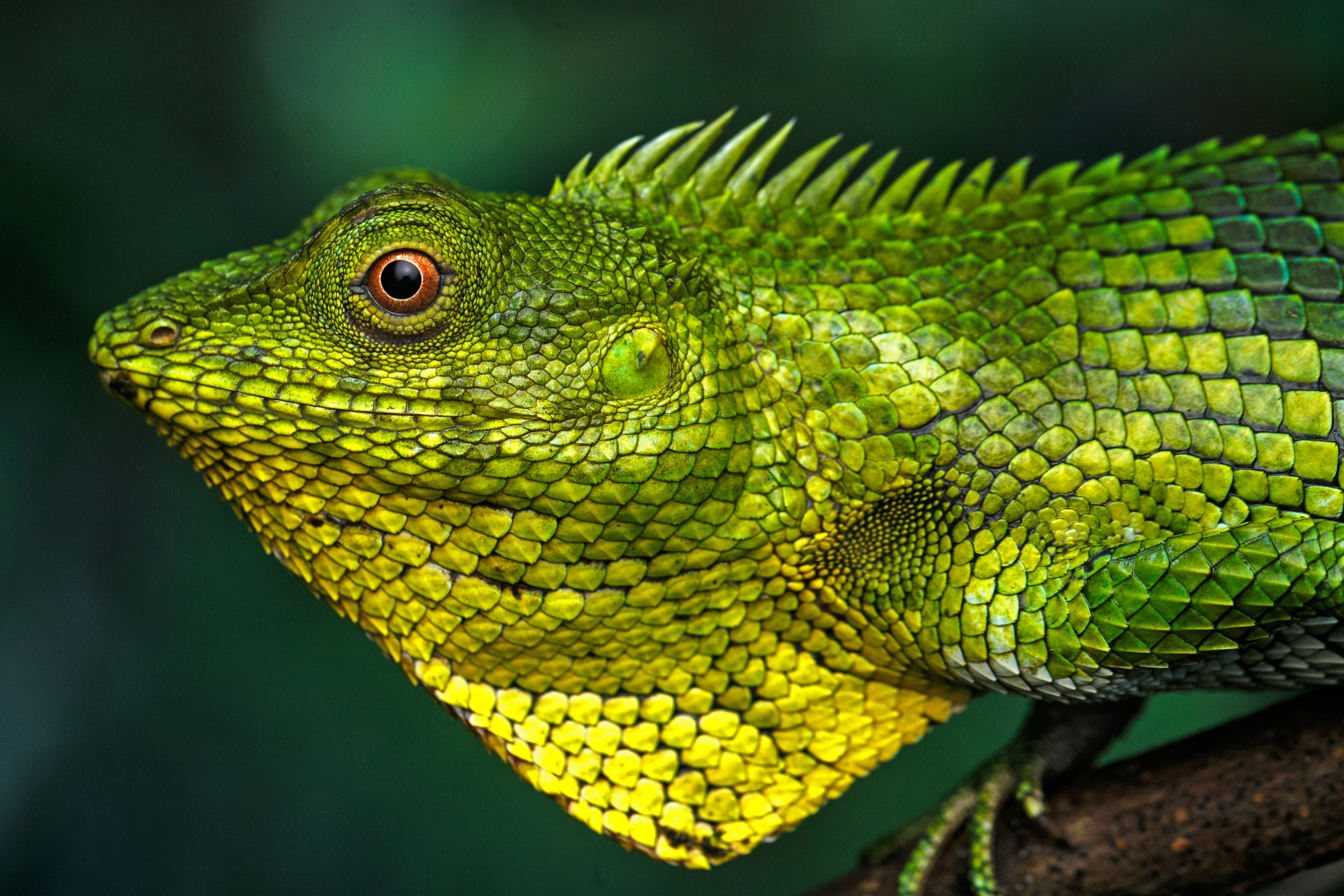
- C. nemoricola
  Calotes jerdoni Günther, 1870 – Jerdon's forest lizard
- Calotes liocephalus Günther, 1872 – spineless forest lizard, crestless lizard, lionhead agama
- Calotes liolepis (Boulenger, 1885) – whistling lizard, Sri Lanka agama
- Calotes manamendrai (Amarasinghe & Karunarathna, 2014) – Manamendra-Arachchi's whistling lizard
- Calotes maria Gray, 1845 – Khasi Hills forest lizard
- Calotes medogensis (Zhao & S.-Q. Li, 1984) – Medog bloodsucker
- Calotes minor (Hardwicke & Gray, 1827) – Hardwicke's bloodsucker
- Calotes mystaceus (A.M.C. Duméril & Bibron, 1837) – Indo-Chinese forest lizard, blue-crested lizard
- Calotes nemoricola Jerdon, 1853 – Nilgiri forest lizard
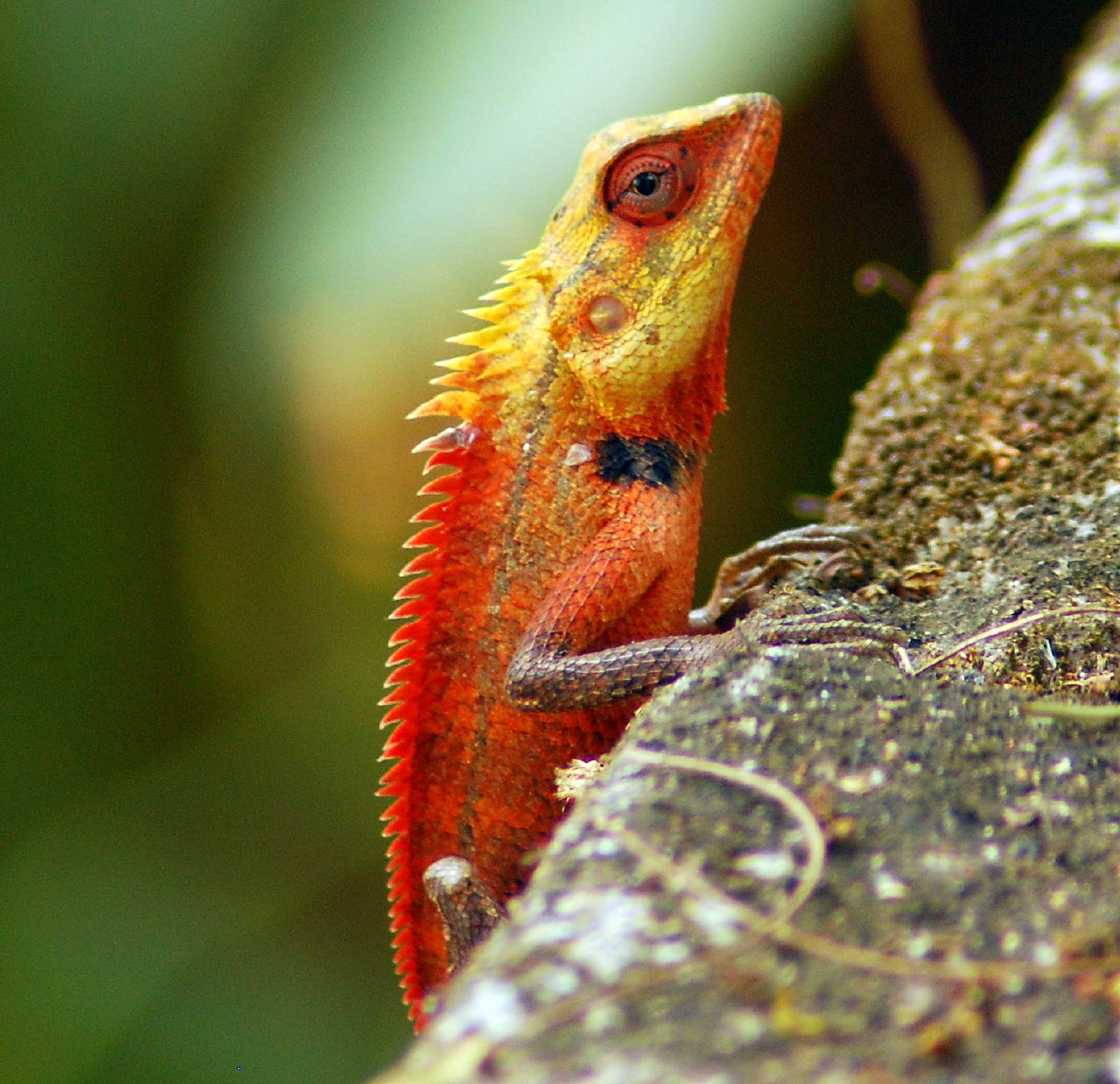
  C. versicolor male.
- Calotes nigrilabris (W. Peters, 1860) – black-cheek lizard
- Calotes nigriplicatus Hallermann, 2000
- Calotes paulus (M.A. Smith, 1935) – small forest lizard
- Calotes pethiyagodai (Amarasinghe, Karunarathna & Hallermann, 2014)
- Calotes sinyik Patel et al. 2024
- Calotes versicolor (Daudin, 1802) – Oriental garden lizard, changeable lizard, eastern garden lizard
- Calotes vindumbarbatus Wagner, Ihlow, Hartmann, Flecks, Schmitz & Böhme, 2021
- Calotes wangi Huang, H.-Y. Li, Wang, M.-J. Li, Hou & Cai, 2024
- Calotes zolaiking Giri, Chaitanya, Mahony, Lalrounga, Lalrinchhana, A. Das, Sarkar, Karanth & Deepak, 2019 – Mizoram montane forest lizard

Two species formerly treated as members of the genus Calotes were separated into a new genus, Monilesaurus, in 2018.

- Monilesaurus ellioti Günther, 1864 – Elliot's forest lizard
- Monilesaurus rouxii A.M.C. Duméril & Bibron, 1837 – Roux's forest lizard, Roux's forest Calotes

Nota bene: A binomial authority in parentheses or a trinomial authority in parentheses indicates that the species or the subspecies was originally described in a genus other than Calotes.

== Gallery ==
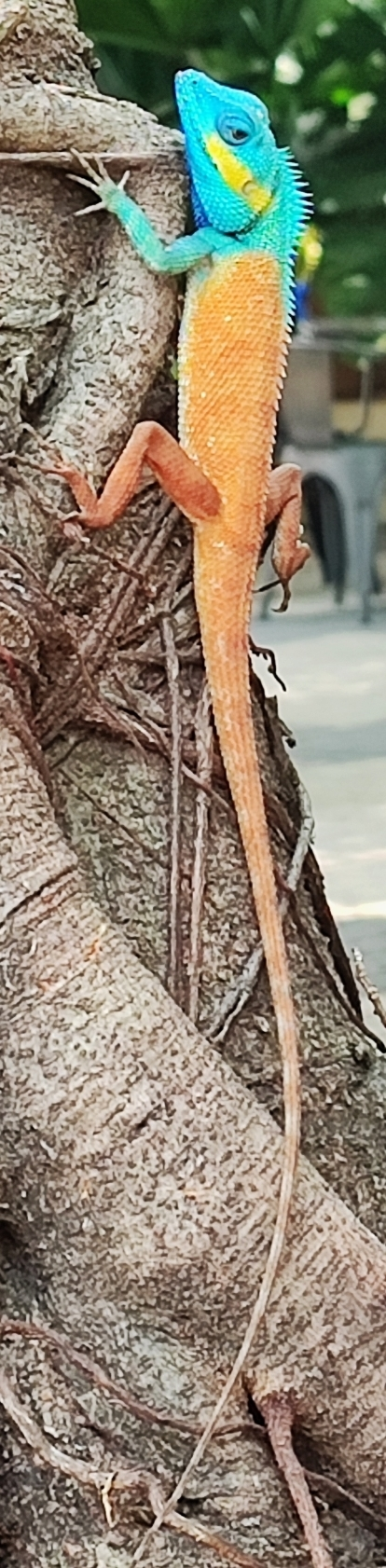
C. bachae

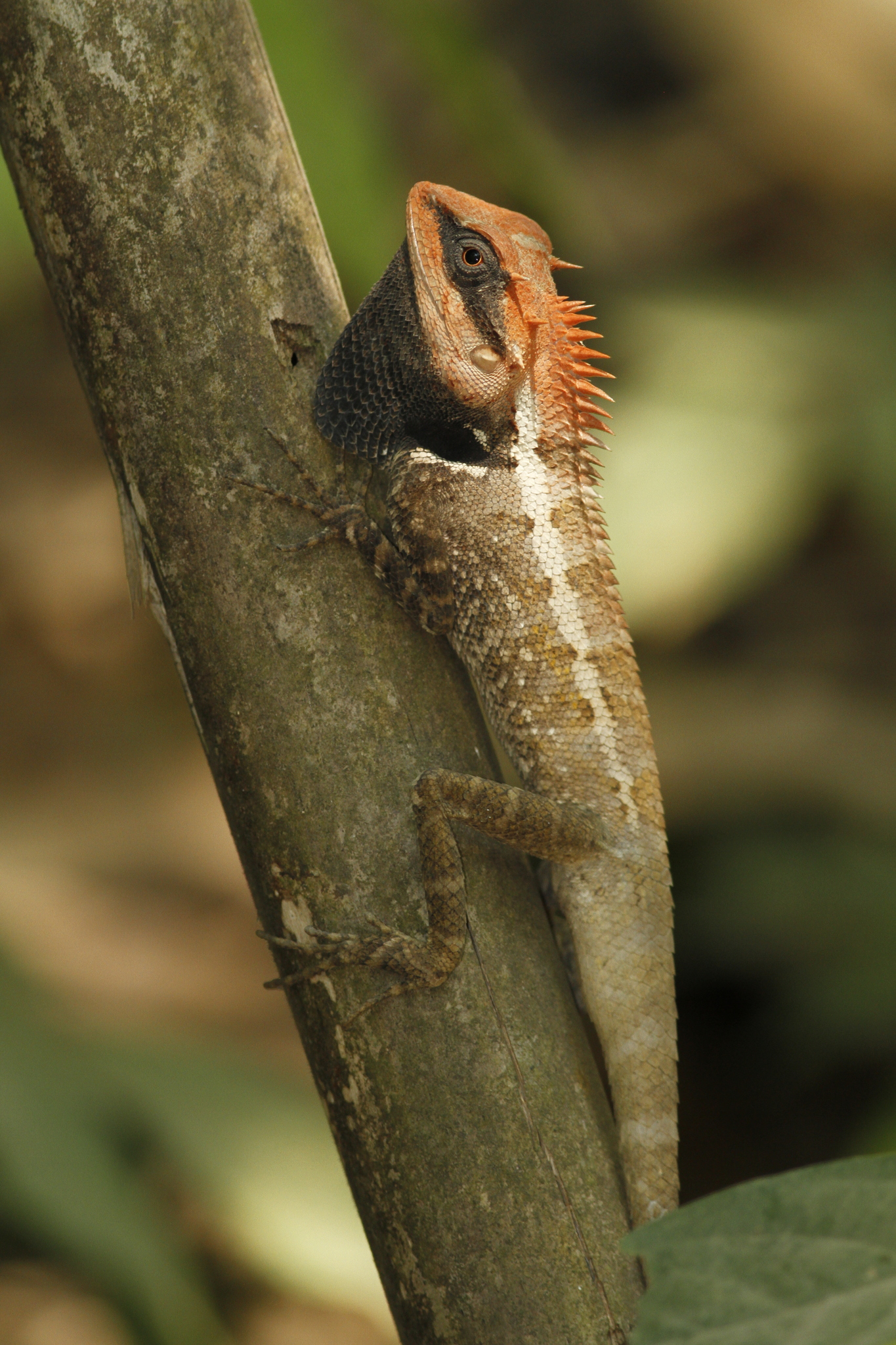
C. emma

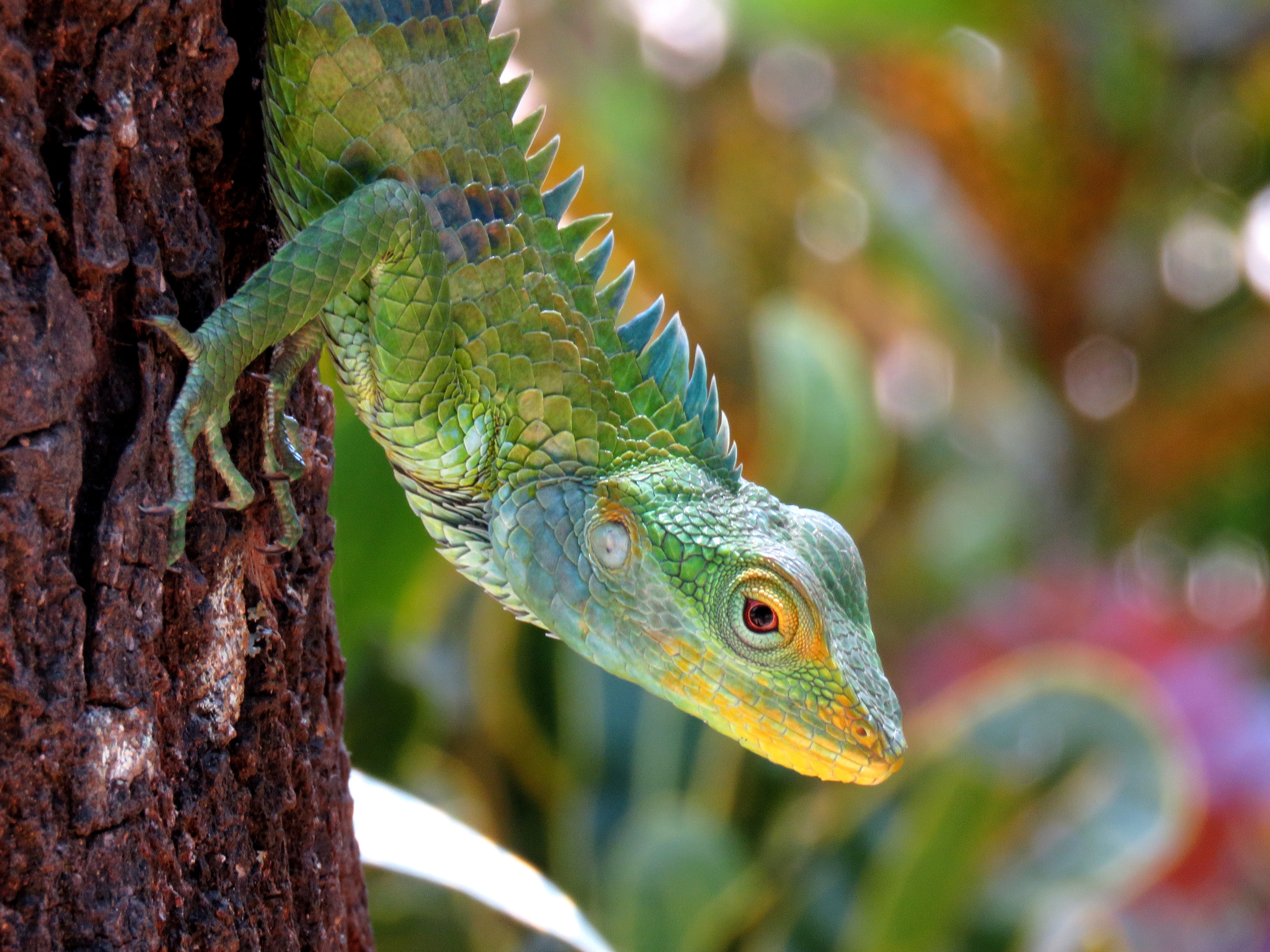
C. grandisquamis

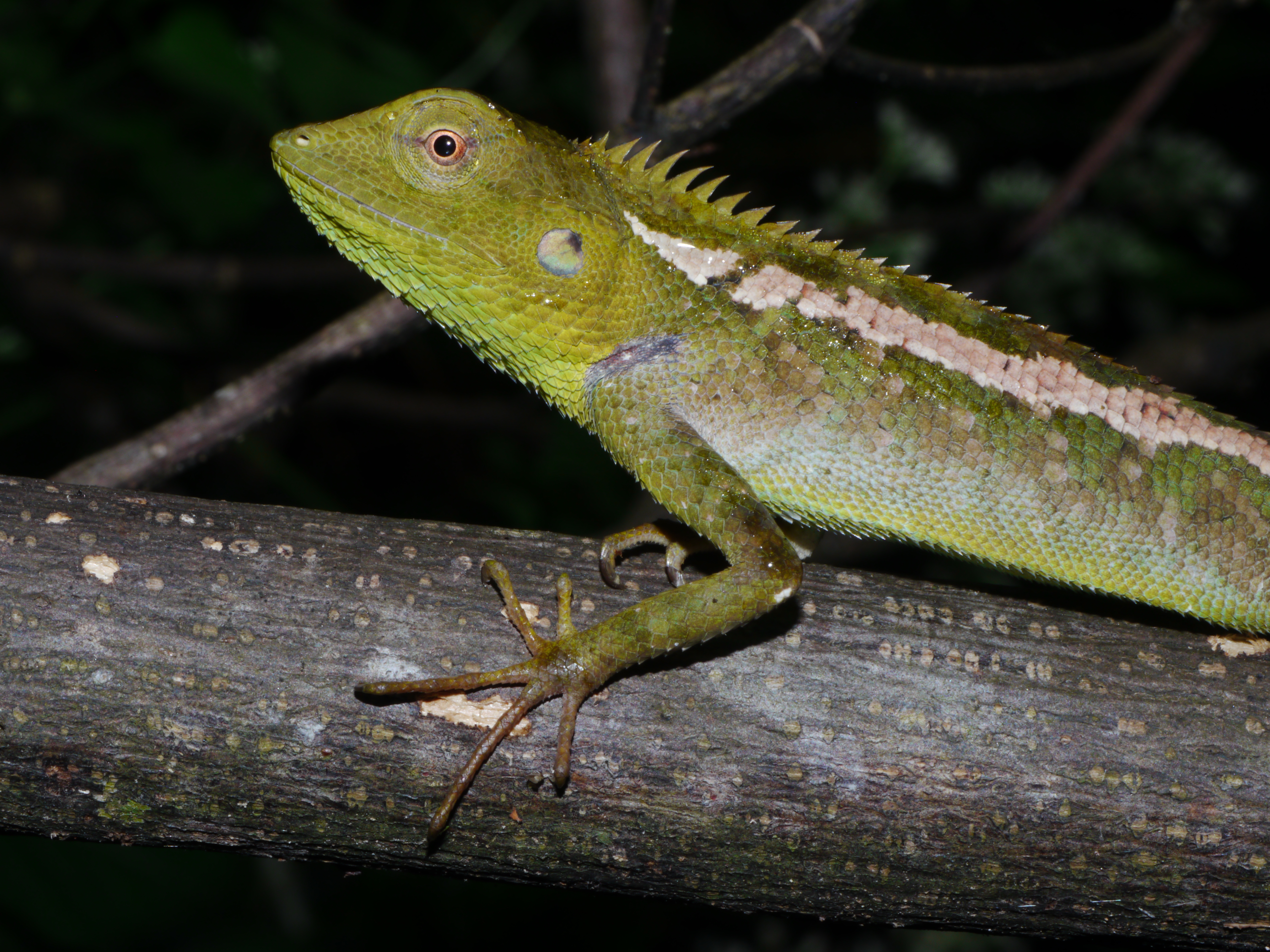
C. jerdoni

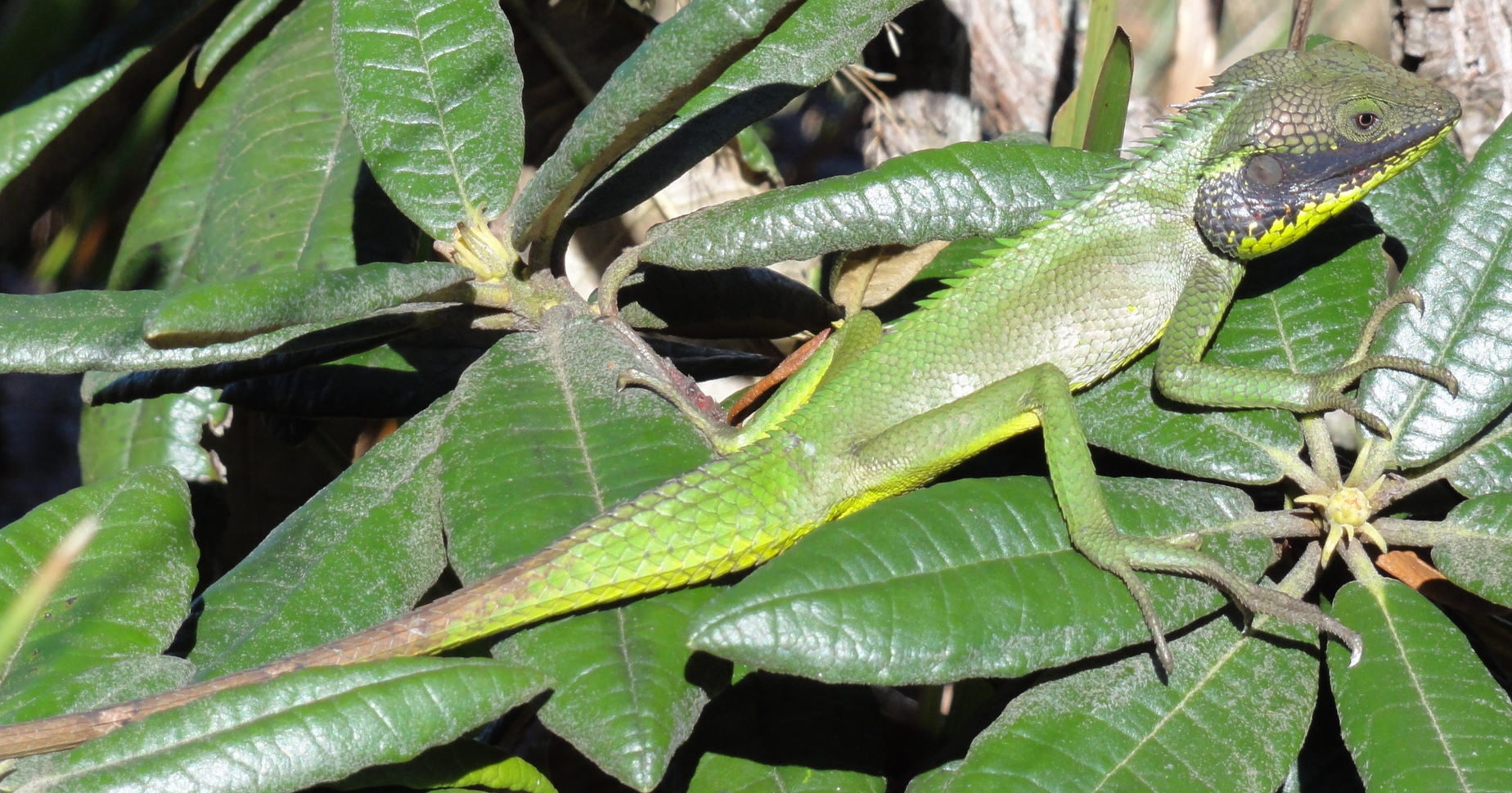
C. nigrilabris

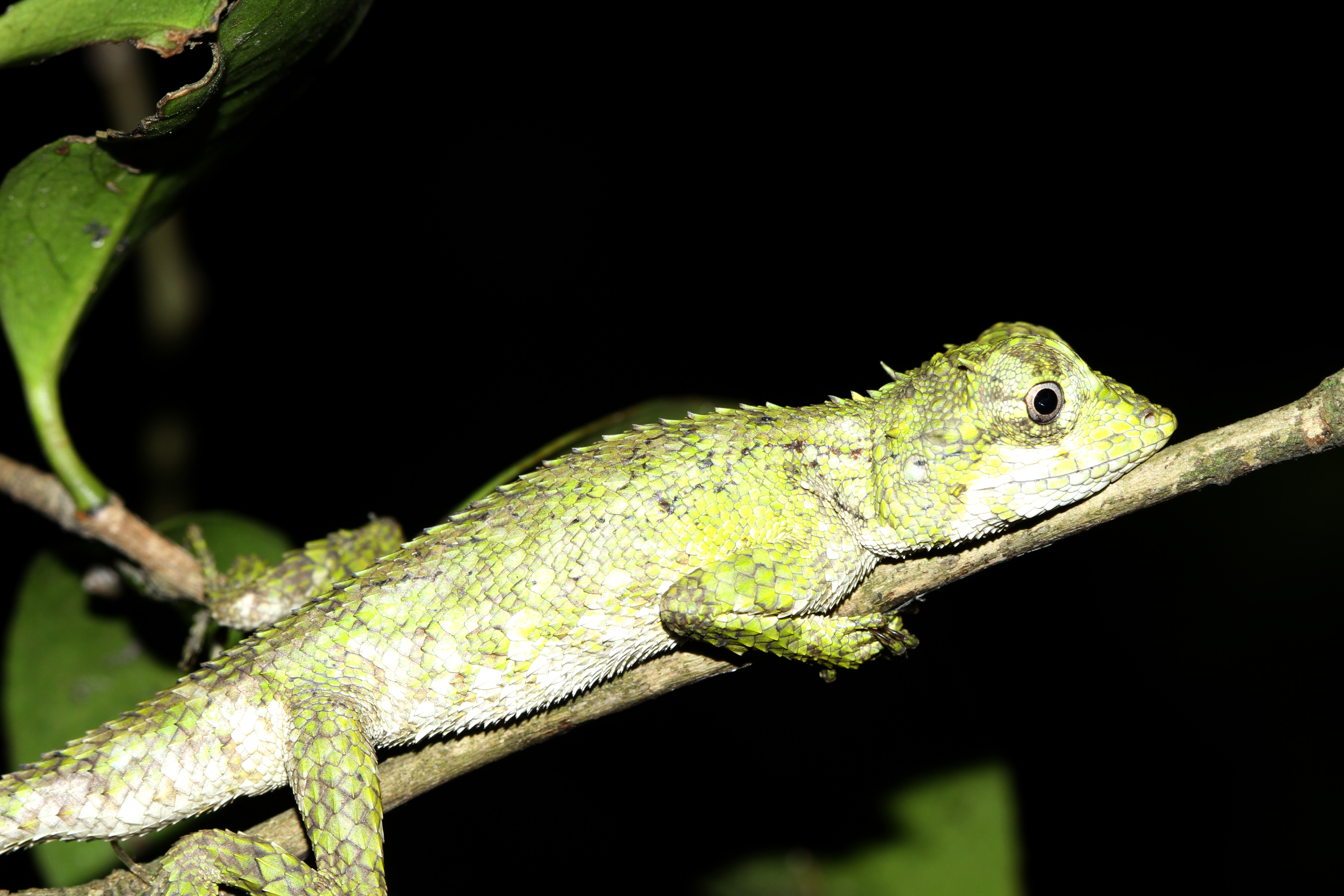
C. paulus

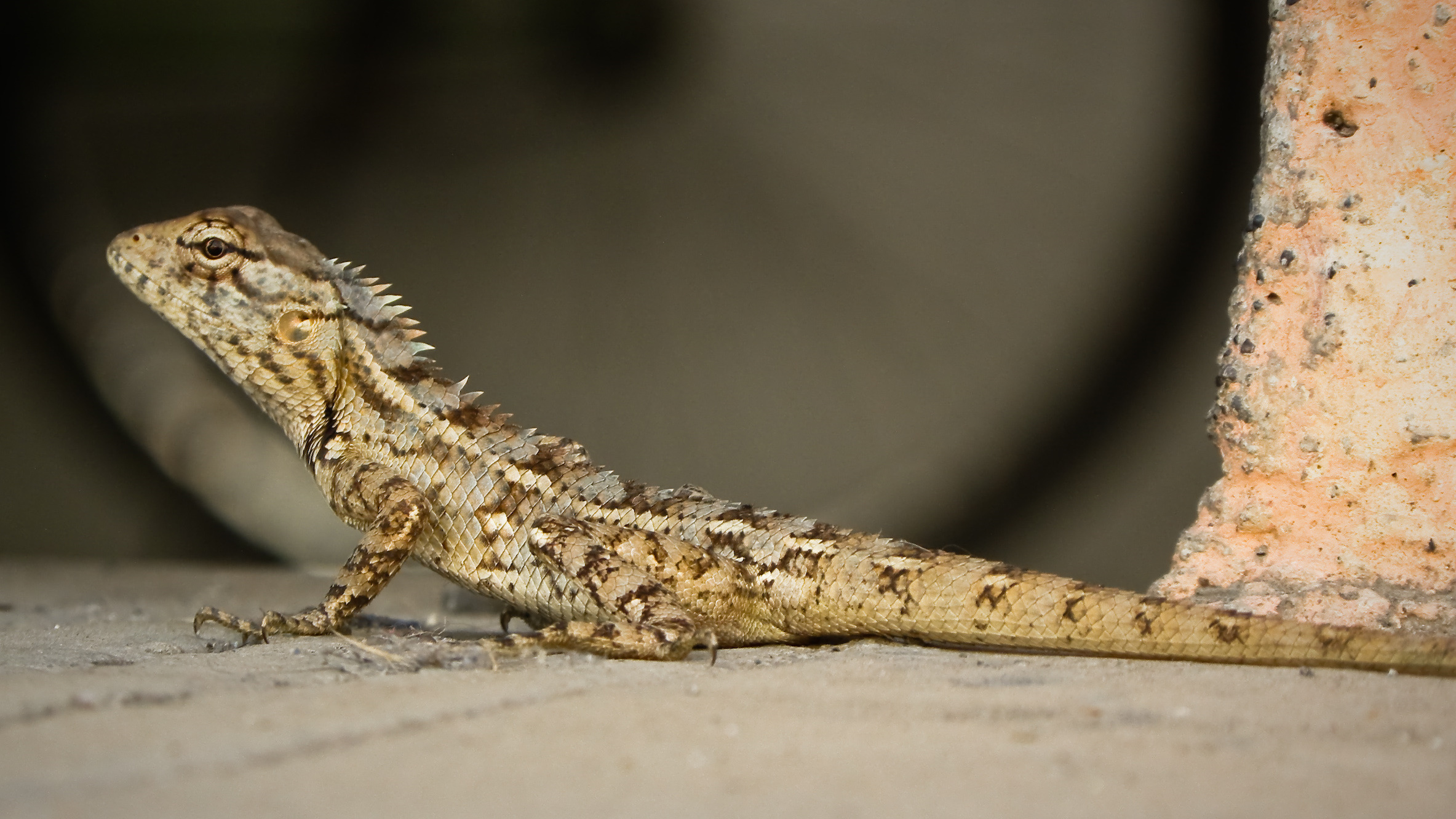
A female Calotes at Pune, India.

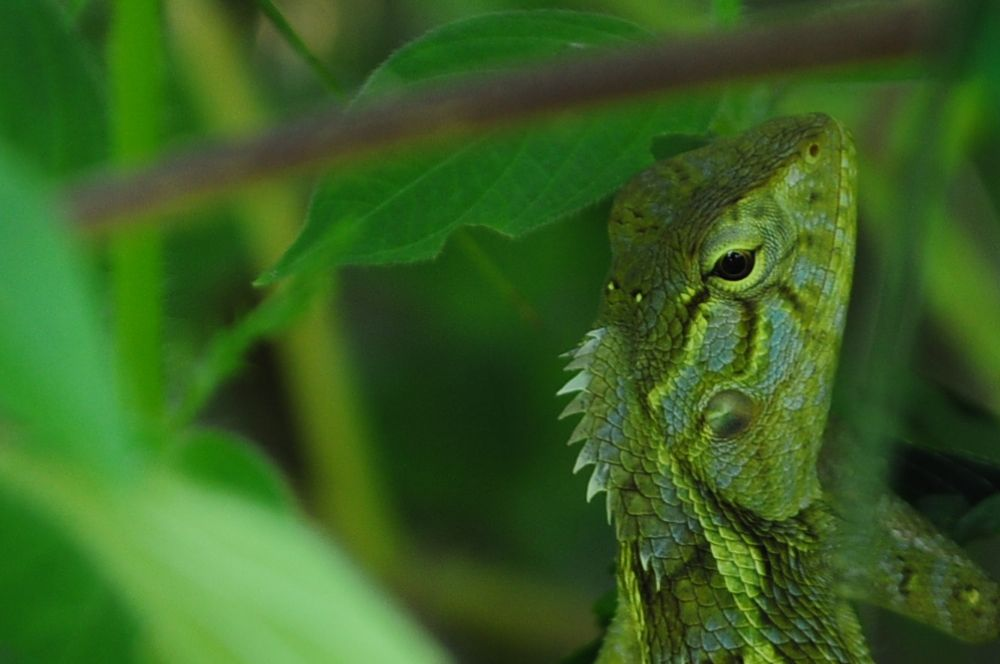
A garden lizard, South India.
