= Calotes goetzi =

Scientific classification
- Kingdom: Animalia
- Phylum: Chordata
- Class: Reptilia
- Order: Squamata
- Suborder: Iguania
- Family: Agamidae
- Genus: Calotes
- Species: C. goetzi

Binomial name
- Calotes goetzi Wagner, Ihlow, Hartmann, Flecks, Schmitz, & Böhme, 2021

Species of lizard

Calotes goetzi is a species of agamid lizard. It is found in China, Laos, Myanmar, and Thailand as well as introduced in Singapore.
