= Calotes farooqi =

Scientific classification
- Domain: Eukaryota
- Kingdom: Animalia
- Phylum: Chordata
- Class: Reptilia
- Order: Squamata
- Suborder: Iguania
- Family: Agamidae
- Genus: Calotes
- Species: C. farooqi

Binomial name
- Calotes farooqi Auffenberg & Rehman, 1995

Species of lizard

Calotes farooqi, Farooq's garden lizard, is a species of agamid lizard. It is endemic to Pakistan.
