= Calotes nigriplicatus =

Scientific classification
- Kingdom: Animalia
- Phylum: Chordata
- Class: Reptilia
- Order: Squamata
- Suborder: Iguania
- Family: Agamidae
- Genus: Calotes
- Species: C. nigriplicatus

Binomial name
- Calotes nigriplicatus Hallermann, 2000

Species of lizard

Calotes nigriplicatus is a species of agamid lizard. It is endemic to Ambon Island in Indonesia.
