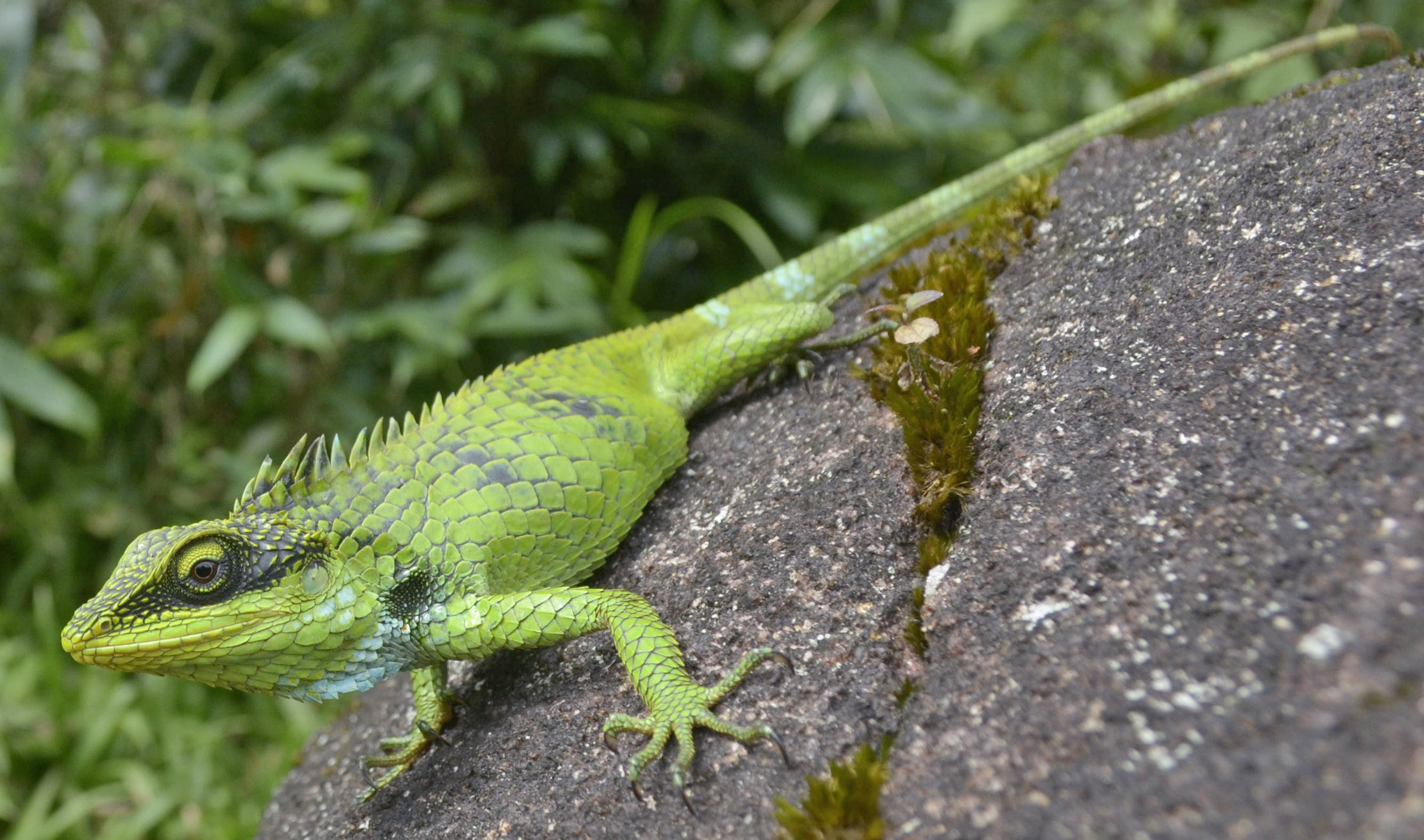

Conservation status
- Least Concern (IUCN 3.1)

Scientific classification
- Kingdom: Animalia
- Phylum: Chordata
- Class: Reptilia
- Order: Squamata
- Suborder: Iguania
- Family: Agamidae
- Genus: Calotes
- Species: C. grandisquamis

Binomial name
- Calotes grandisquamis Günther, 1875

= Calotes grandisquamis =

Large-scaled forest lizard

Species of lizard

Calotes grandisquamis, the large-scaled forest lizard, is an arboreal, diurnal, insectivorous agamid lizard found in the evergreen rainforests of the Western Ghats of India; distributed from Agumbe to Agasthyamalai Hills.

== Gallery ==
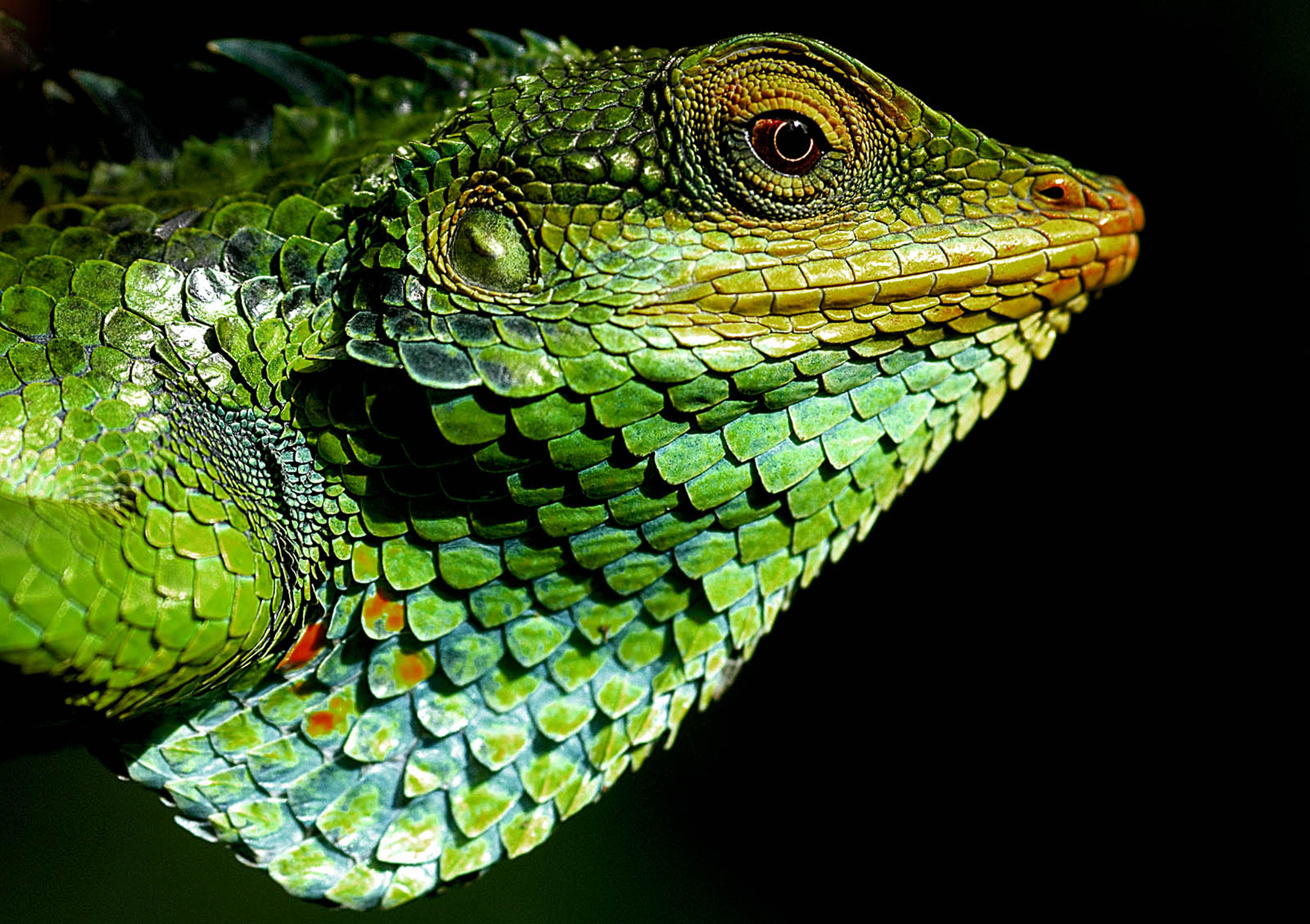
Head

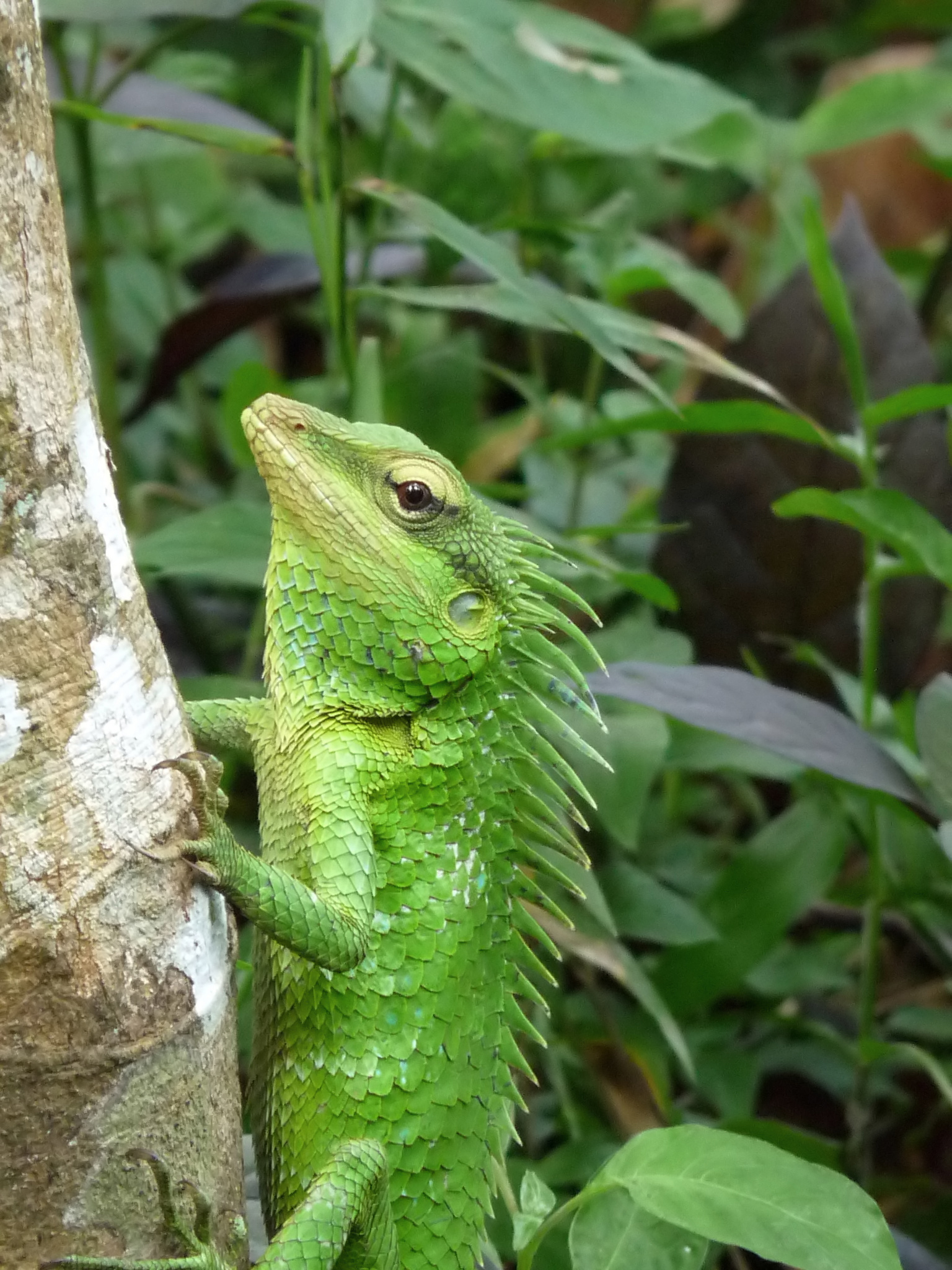
In Kerala

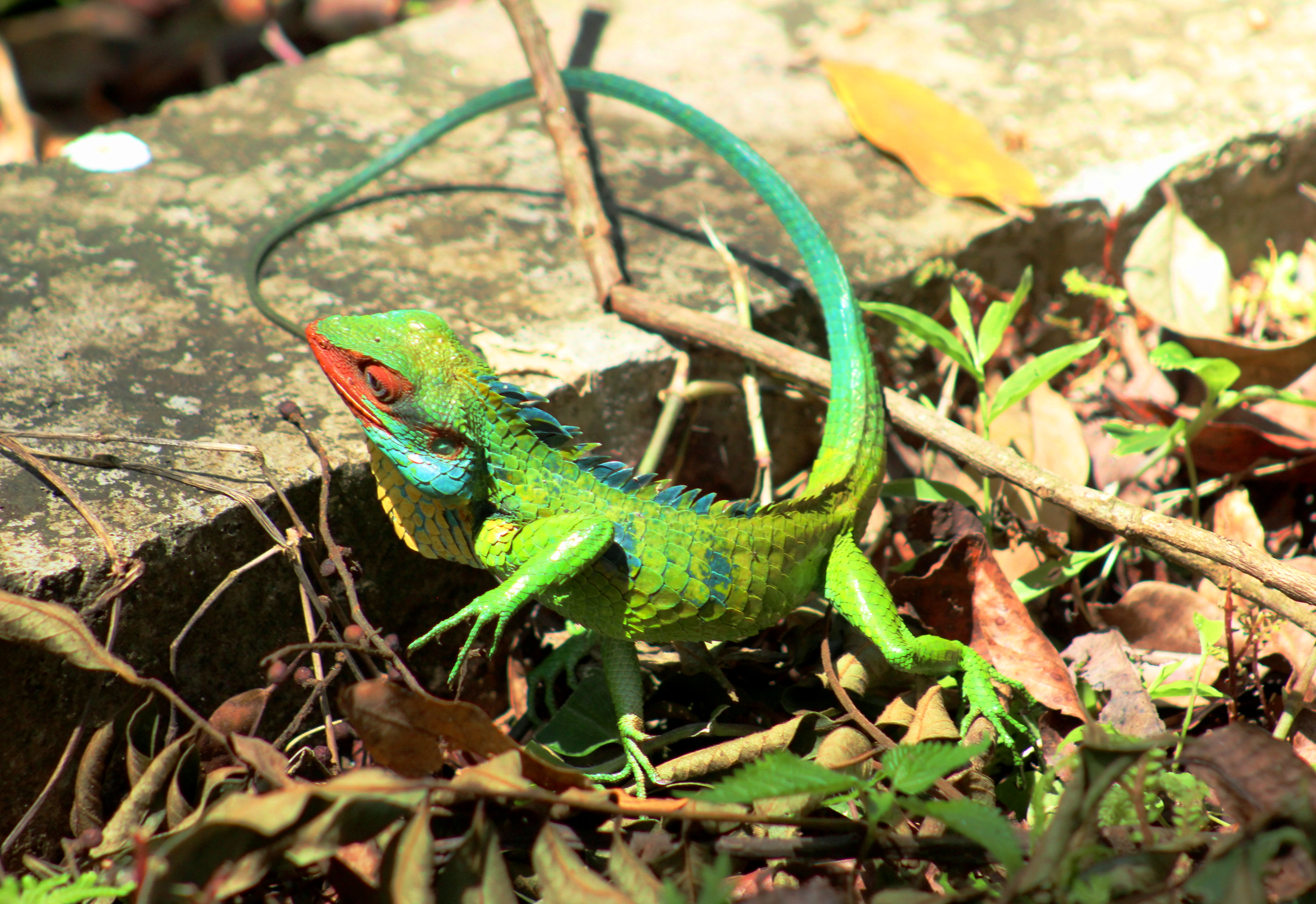

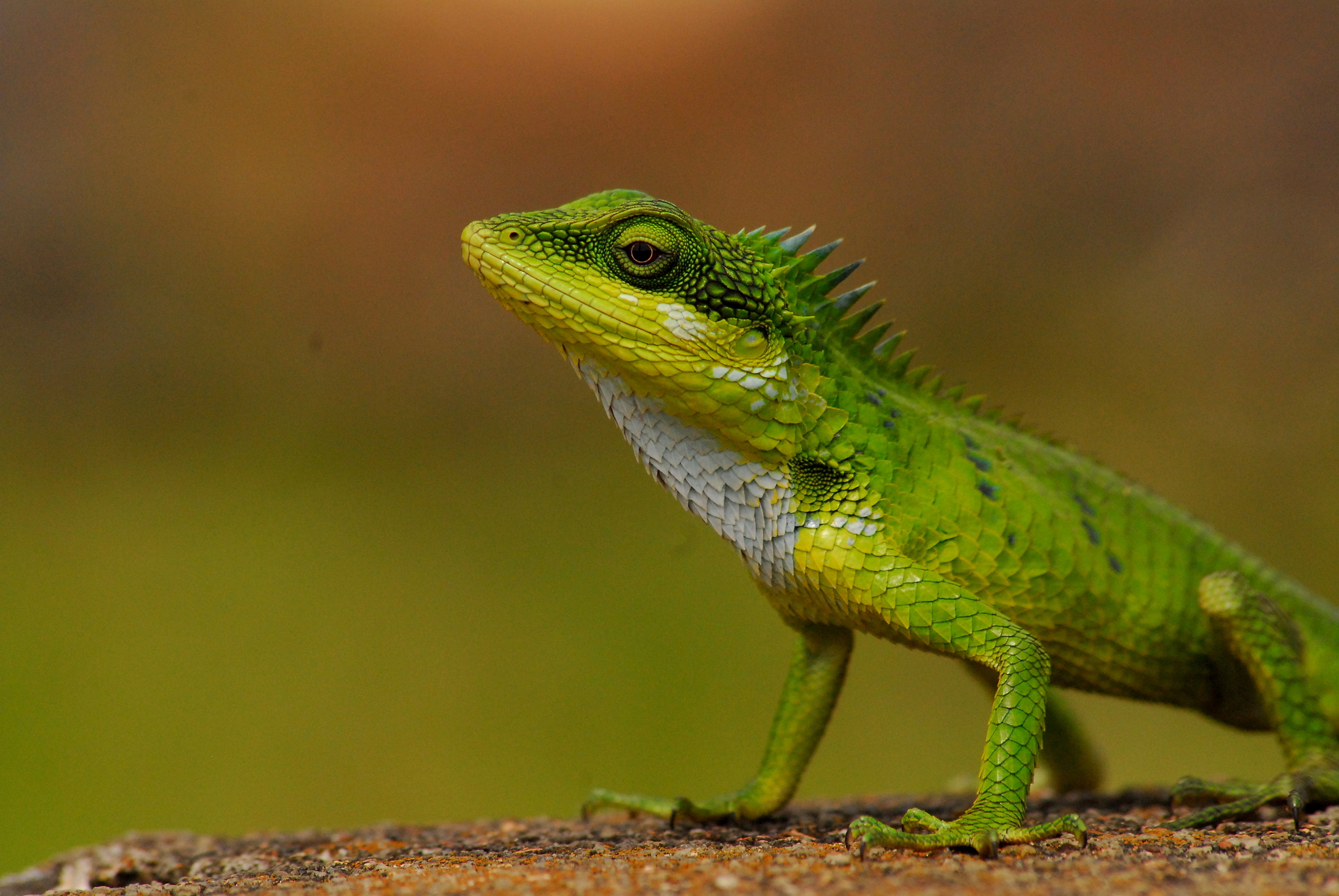

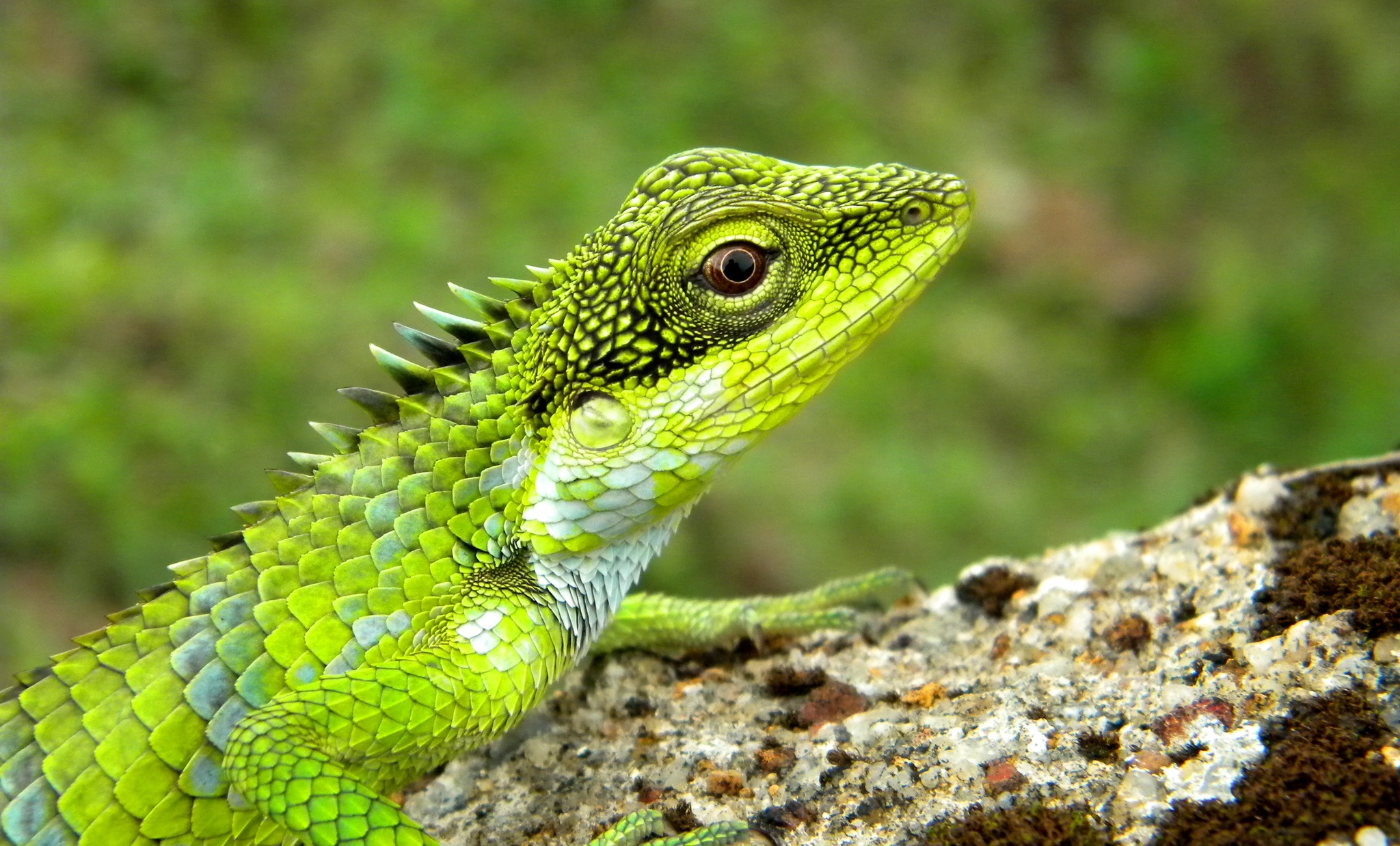

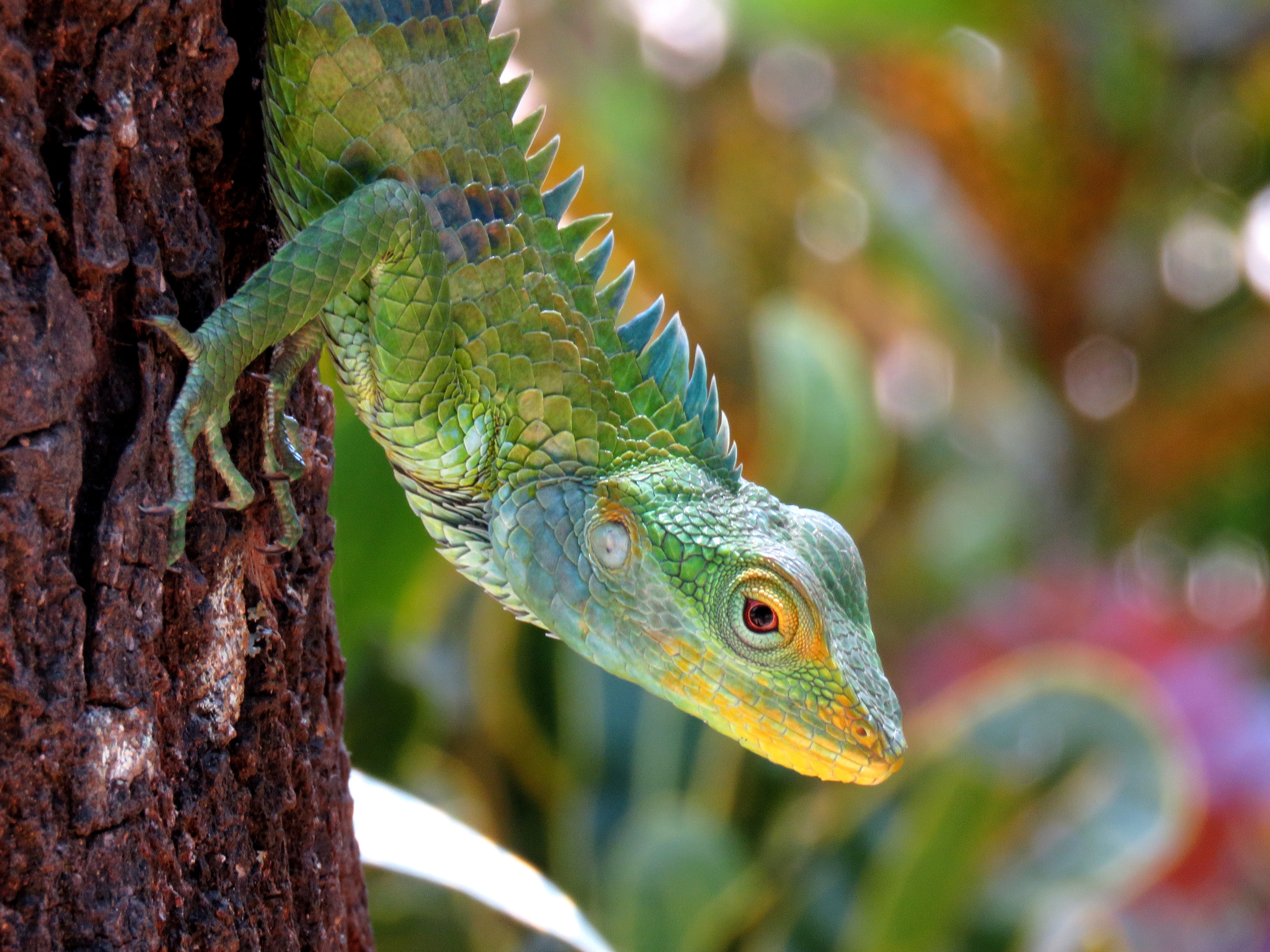
