= Calotes irawadi =

Conservation status
- Least Concern (IUCN 3.1)

Scientific classification
- Kingdom: Animalia
- Phylum: Chordata
- Class: Reptilia
- Order: Squamata
- Suborder: Iguania
- Family: Agamidae
- Genus: Calotes
- Species: C. irawadi

Binomial name
- Calotes irawadi Zug, Brown, Schulte, & Vindum, 2006

Species of lizard

Calotes irawadi is a species of agamid lizard. It is endemic to Myanmar.
