= Calotes zolaiking =

Scientific classification
- Kingdom: Animalia
- Phylum: Chordata
- Order: Squamata
- Suborder: Iguania
- Family: Agamidae
- Genus: Calotes
- Species: C. zolaiking

Binomial name
- Calotes zolaiking Giri, Chaitanya, Mahony, Lalrounga, Lalrinchhana, Das, Sarkar, Karanth, & Deepak, 2019

Species of lizard

Calotes zolaiking, the Mizoram montane forest lizard, is a species of agamid lizard. It is endemic to India.
