= Calotes manamendrai =

Manamendra-Arachchi's whistling lizard

Conservation status
- Endangered (IUCN 3.1)

Scientific classification
- Kingdom: Animalia
- Phylum: Chordata
- Class: Reptilia
- Order: Squamata
- Suborder: Iguania
- Family: Agamidae
- Genus: Calotes
- Species: C. manamendrai

Binomial name
- Calotes manamendrai Amarasinghe & Karunarathna, 2014

Species of lizard

Calotes manamendrai (Manamendra-Arachchi's whistling lizard) is an agamid lizard endemic to Sri Lanka. Locally known as මනමේන්ද්‍ර-ආරච්චිගේ උරුවන් කටුස්සා (Manamendra-Arachchigë Uruwan Katussa).It is only recorded from a one site at the Northern face of the Knuckles Mountain Range, Riverstone about 1,000 m (3,300 ft) above sea level.

== Etymology ==
The specific name is as an honor to the herpetologist and taxonomist Kelum Manamendra-Arachchi for his remarkable contributions to the biodiversity and zooarchaeology of Sri Lanka for more than three decades.

== Description ==
Female with non enlarged pectoral scales. Dorsal scales keeled. Midgular scales smaller than the rest of the throat scales. Seven distinct stripes found on each side on gular area. Shoulder pit blackish.
