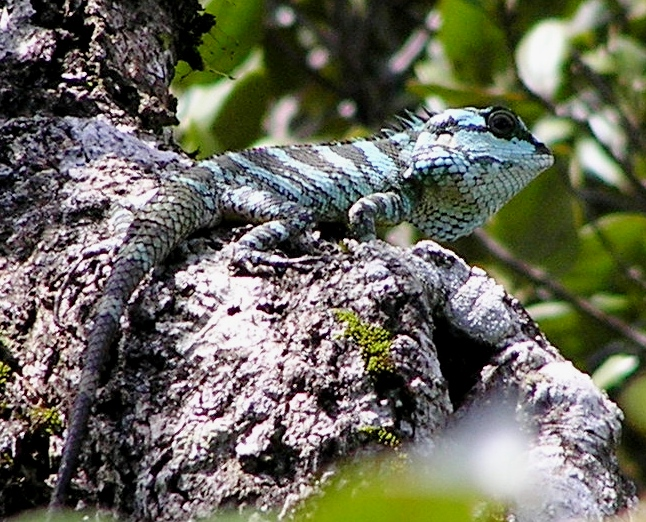

Conservation status
- Endangered (IUCN 2.3)

Scientific classification
- Kingdom: Animalia
- Phylum: Chordata
- Class: Reptilia
- Order: Squamata
- Suborder: Iguania
- Family: Agamidae
- Genus: Calotes
- Species: C. liocephalus

Binomial name
- Calotes liocephalus Günther, 1872

= Spineless forest lizard =

Spineless forest Lizard

Species of lizard

The spineless forest lizard, crestless lizard or lionhead agama (Calotes liocephalus) is a species of lizard in the family Agamidae. It is endemic to Sri Lanka.

== Description ==
Calotes liocephalus grows to 91 mm (3.6 in) in snout–vent length and 33 cm (13 in) in total length.

Spineless forest lizard is one of four Calotes species endemic to Sri Lanka, which all share a common set of characteristics. These include a relatively short head, with swollen cheeks, backwards, or backwards and downwards pointing scales on the side of the body, a tail that is strongly swollen at the base in fully grown adult males. This lizard is patterned with a mixture of pale moss-green, dark green and brown indistinct stripes on its body, extending from the back down the sides to the belly, and pale moss-green and dark brown to black rings around its limbs and tail. This cryptic colouration helps camouflage the small lizard from potential predators in the treetops of its habitat. The spineless forest lizard closely resembles the green garden lizard (Calotes calotes) but can be distinguished by the absence of spines above the ear found in other Calotes species, a feature that has earned the lizard its common name.

== Ecology ==
Highly arboreal, very rarely comes to the ground, this species is known to be diurnal. Oviparous, and known to lay 5-6 eggs per time.

== Diet ==
Feed on insects and other small animals, although a few also feed on plant matter as adults.
