= Iridescence =

Optical property

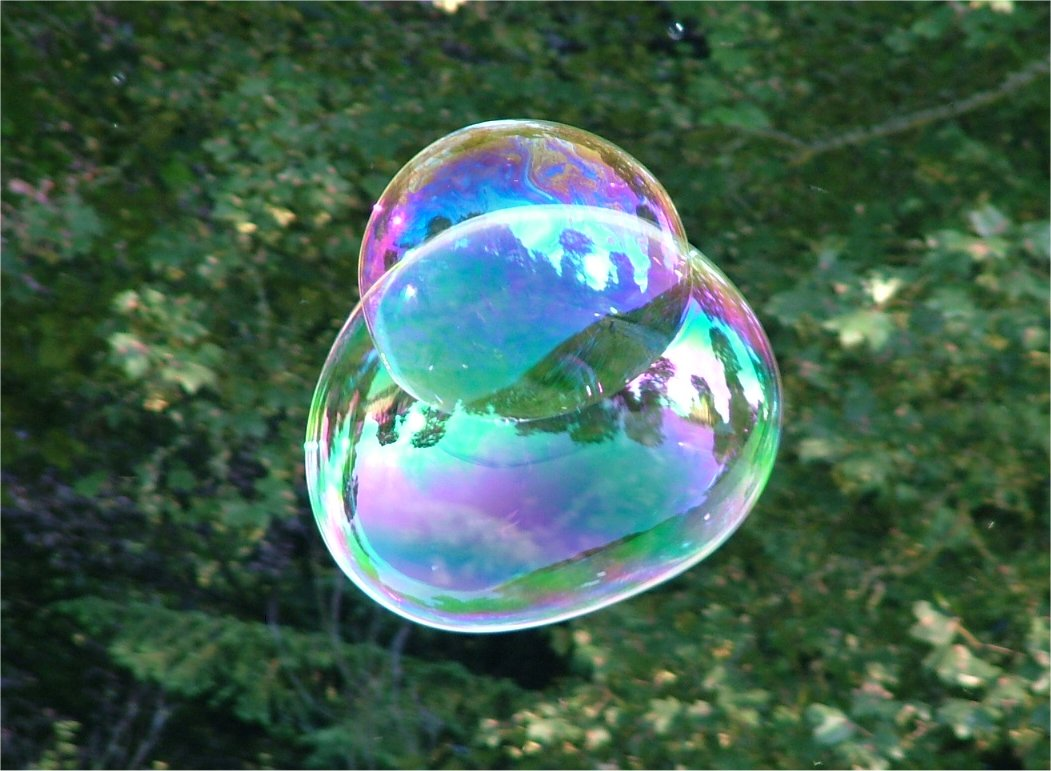
Iridescence in soap bubbles

Iridescence (also known as goniochromism) is the phenomenon of certain surfaces that appear gradually to change colour as the angle of view or the angle of illumination changes. Iridescence is caused by wave interference of light in microstructures or thin films. Examples of iridescence include soap bubbles, feathers, butterfly wings and seashell nacre, and the mineraloid opal. Pearlescence is a related effect where some or most of the reflected light is white. The term pearlescent is used to describe certain paint finishes, usually in the automotive industry, which actually produce iridescent effects.

== Etymology ==
The word iridescence is derived in part from the Greek word ἶρις îris (gen. ἴριδος íridos), meaning rainbow, and is combined with the Latin suffix -escent, meaning "having a tendency toward". Iris in turn derives from the goddess Iris of Greek mythology, who is the personification of the rainbow and acted as a messenger of the gods. Goniochromism is derived from the Greek words gonia, meaning "angle", and chroma, meaning "colour".

== Mechanisms ==
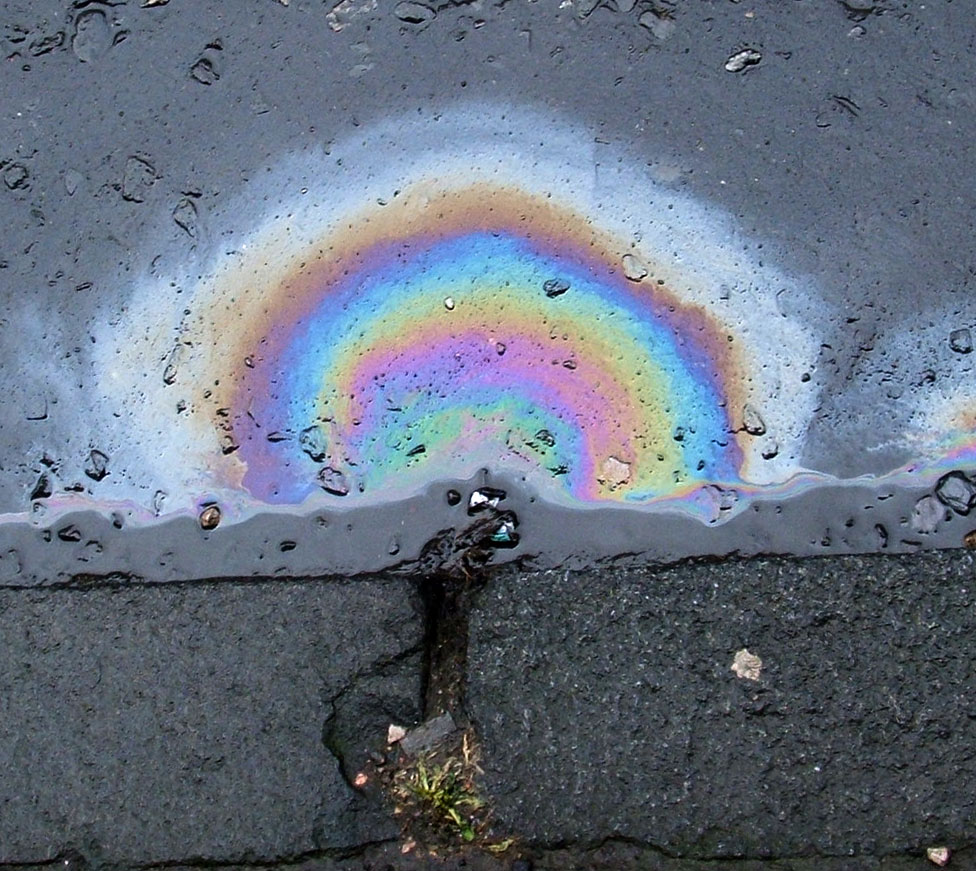
Fuel on top of water creates a thin film, which interferes with the light, producing different colours. The different bands represent different thicknesses in the film. This phenomenon is known as thin-film interference.

Iridescence is an optical phenomenon of surfaces in which hue changes with the angle of observation and the angle of illumination. This is fundamentally diffraction where the intensity of reflected light varies with direction and frequency. It is often caused by multiple reflections from two or more semi-transparent surfaces in which phase shift and interference of the reflections modulates the incidental light, by amplifying or attenuating some frequencies more than others. The thickness of the layers of the material determines the interference pattern. Iridescence can for example be described as thin-film, the functional analogue of selective wavelength attenuation as seen with the Fabry–Pérot interferometer, and can be seen in oil films on water and soap bubbles. Iridescence is also found in plants, animals and many other items. The range of colours of natural iridescent objects can be narrow, for example shifting between two or three colours as the viewing angle changes,

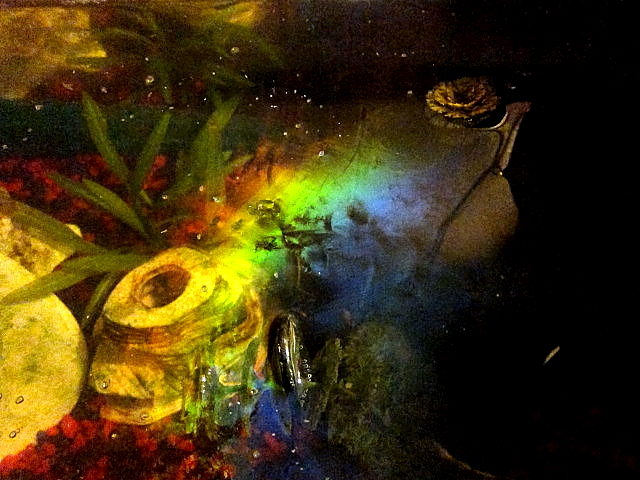
An iridescent biofilm on the surface of a fish tank diffracts the reflected light, displaying the entire spectrum of colours. Red is seen from longer angles of incidence than blue.

Iridescence can also be created by diffraction from periodic objects such as CDs, DVDs, some types of prisms, or cloud iridescence. Often the entire rainbow of colours will typically be observed as the viewing angle changes. In biology, this type of iridescence results from the formation of diffraction gratings on the surface, such as the long rows of cells in striated muscle, or the specialised abdominal scales of peacock spider Maratus robinsoni and M. chrysomelas. Some types of flower petals can also generate a diffraction grating, but the iridescence is not visible to humans and flower-visiting insects as the diffraction signal is masked by the colouration due to plant pigments.

In biological (and biomimetic) uses, colours produced other than with pigments or dyes are called structural colouration. Microstructures, often multi-layered, are used to produce bright but sometimes non-iridescent colours: quite elaborate arrangements are needed to avoid reflecting different colours in different directions. Structural colouration has been understood in general terms since Robert Hooke's 1665 book Micrographia, where Hooke correctly noted that since the iridescence of a peacock's feather was lost when it was plunged into water, but reappeared when it was returned to the air, pigments could not be responsible. It was later found that iridescence in the peacock is due to a complex photonic crystal.

== Pearlescence ==
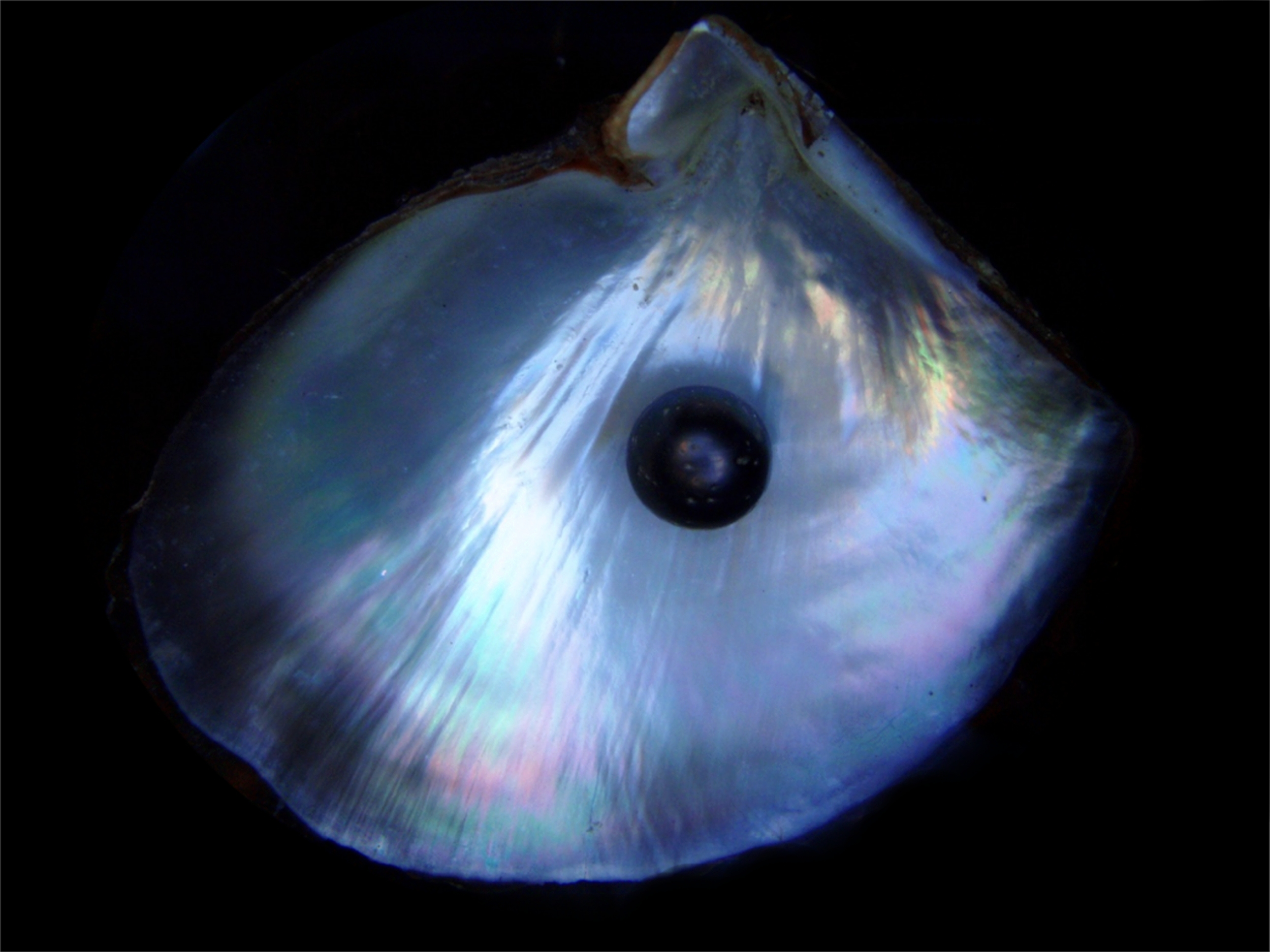
The pearlescent shell of a black-lip pearl oyster

Pearlescence is an effect related to iridescence and has a similar cause. Structures within a surface cause light to be reflected back, but in the case of pearlescence some or most of the light is white, giving the object a pearl-like luster. Artificial pigments and paints showing an iridescent effect are often described as pearlescent, for example when used for car paints.

== Examples ==
=== Life ===
==== Plants ====
Many groups of plants have developed iridescence as an adaptation to dark environments. The leaves of Southeast Asia's Begonia pavonina, or peacock begonia, appear iridescent azure due to each leaf's thinly layered photosynthetic structures called iridoplasts that absorb and bend light much like a film of oil over water. Iridescences based on multiple layers of cells are also found in the lycophyte Selaginella and several species of ferns, such as the blue oil fern.

Several species of cave-dwelling bryophytes are iridescent, such as the liverwort Cyathodium cavernarum and the mosses Mittenia plumula and Schistostega pennata.

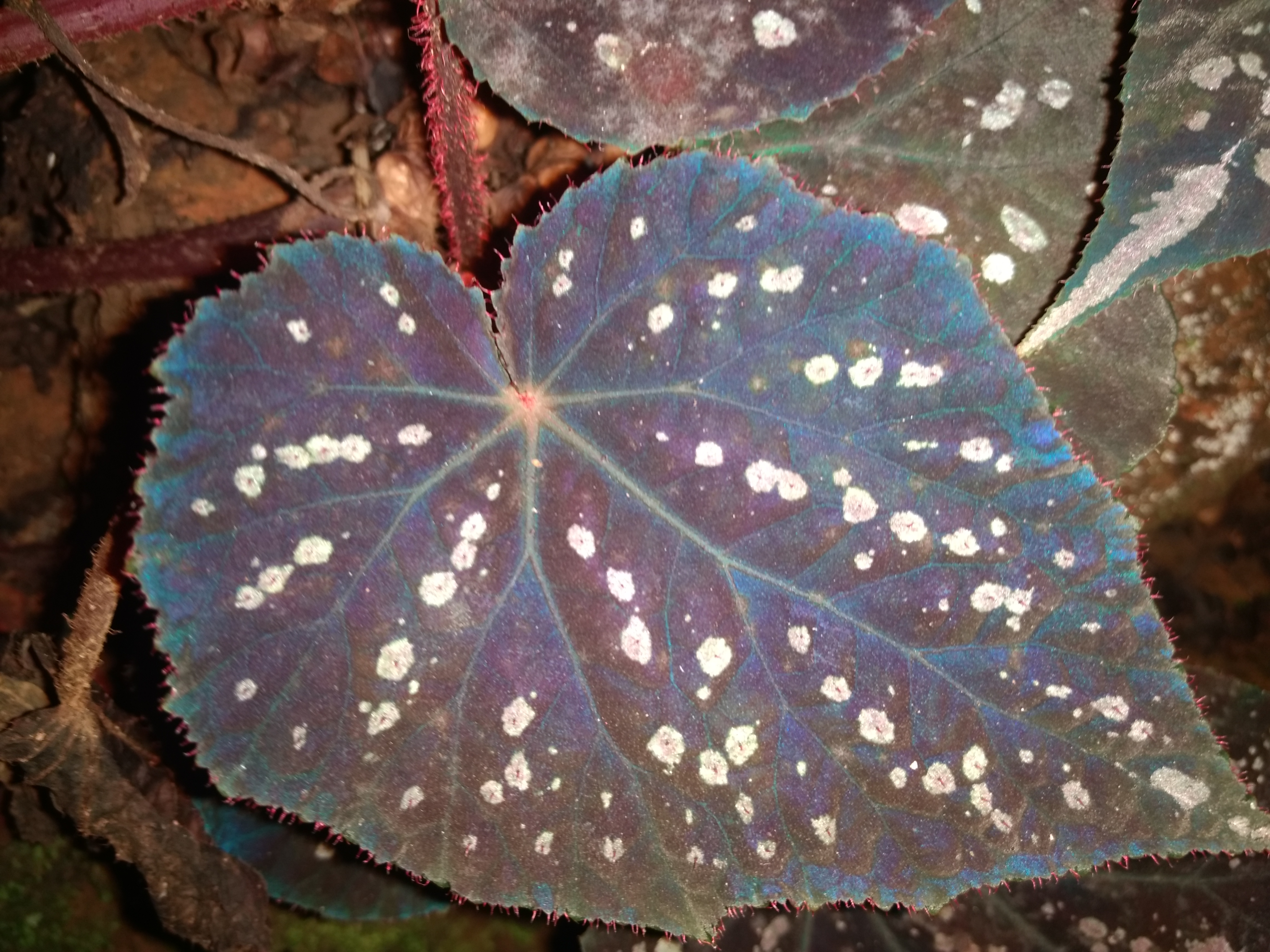
Iridescent Begonia leaf

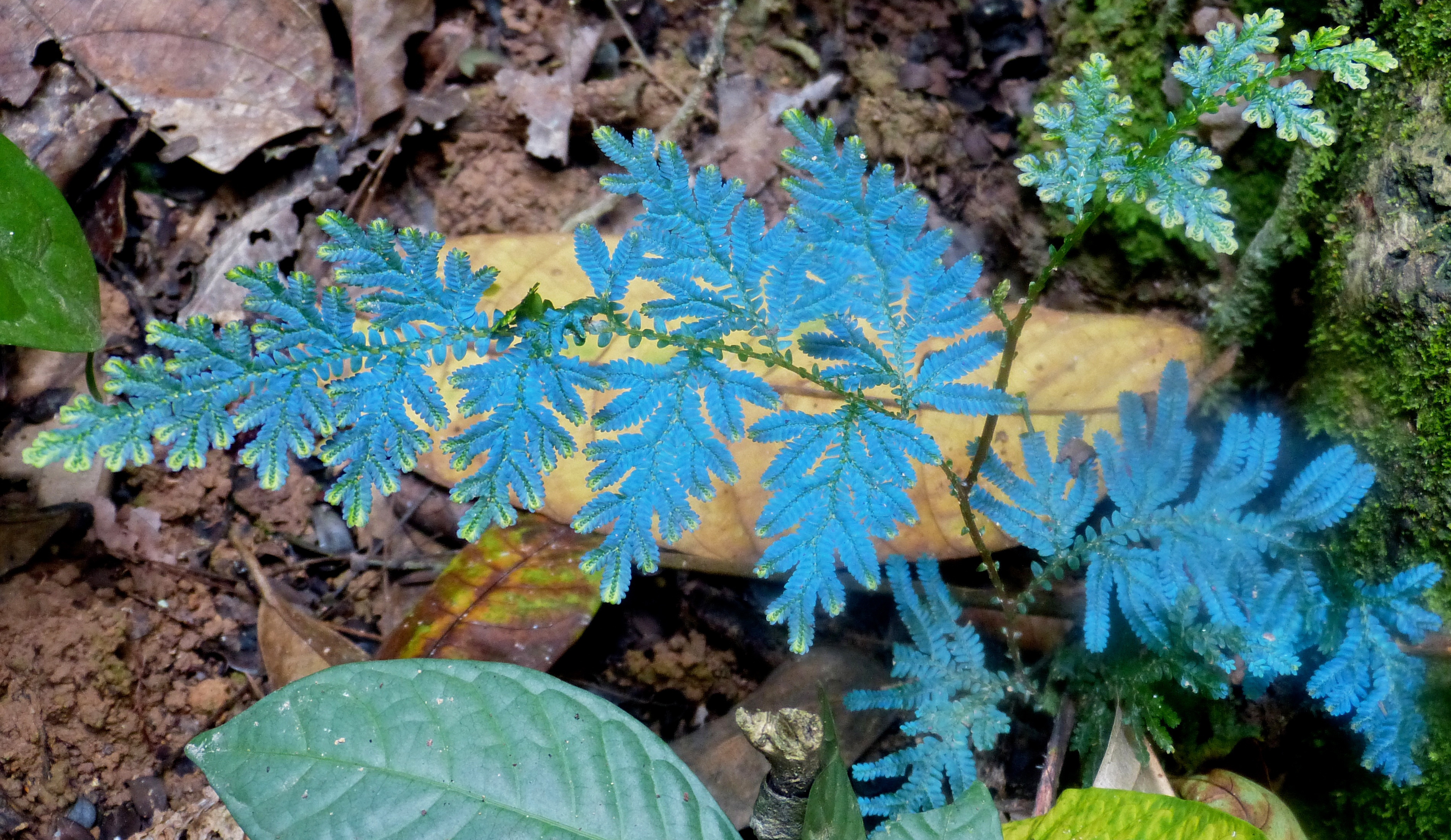
Selaginella wildenowii leaves

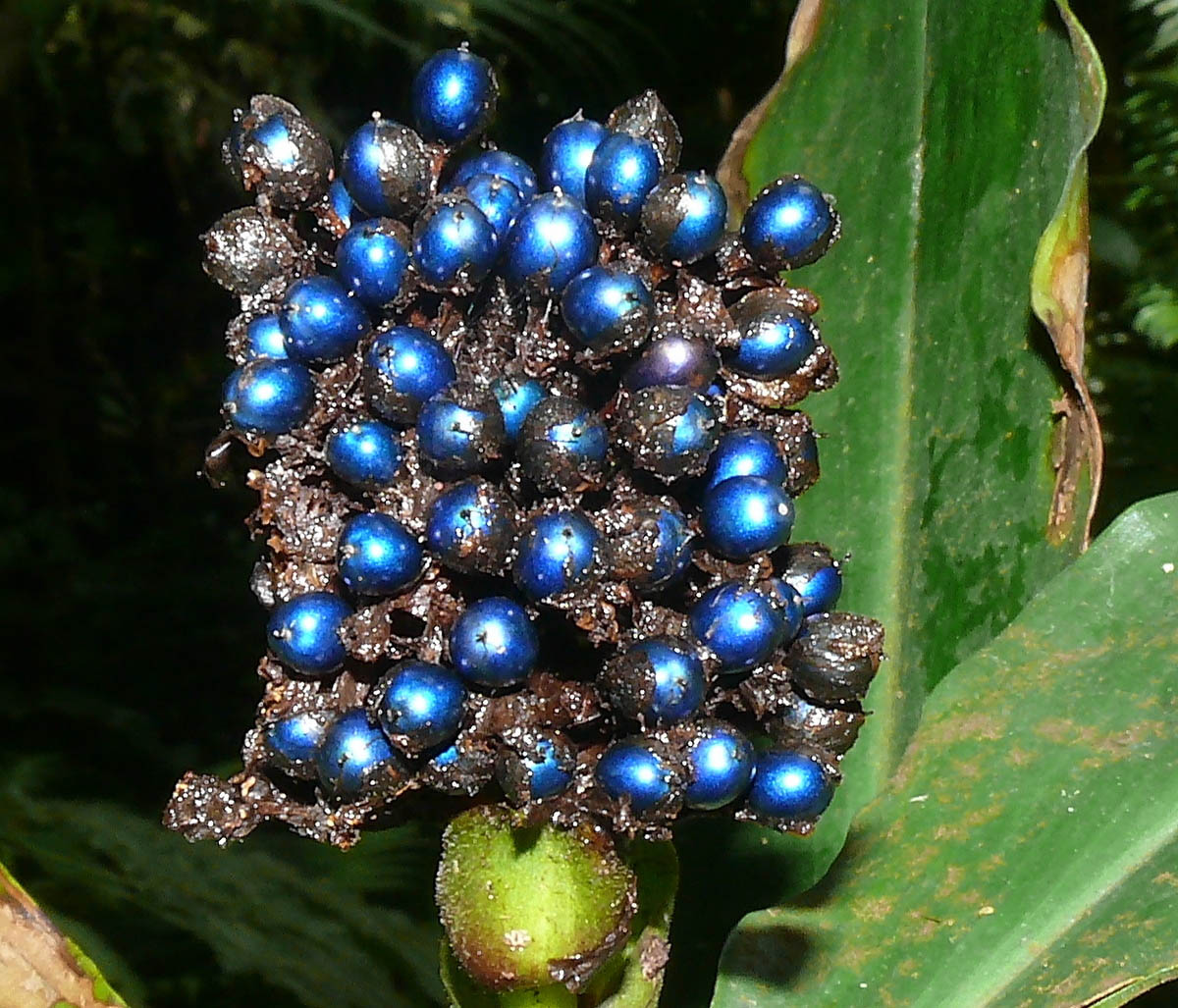
Pollia condensata fruit

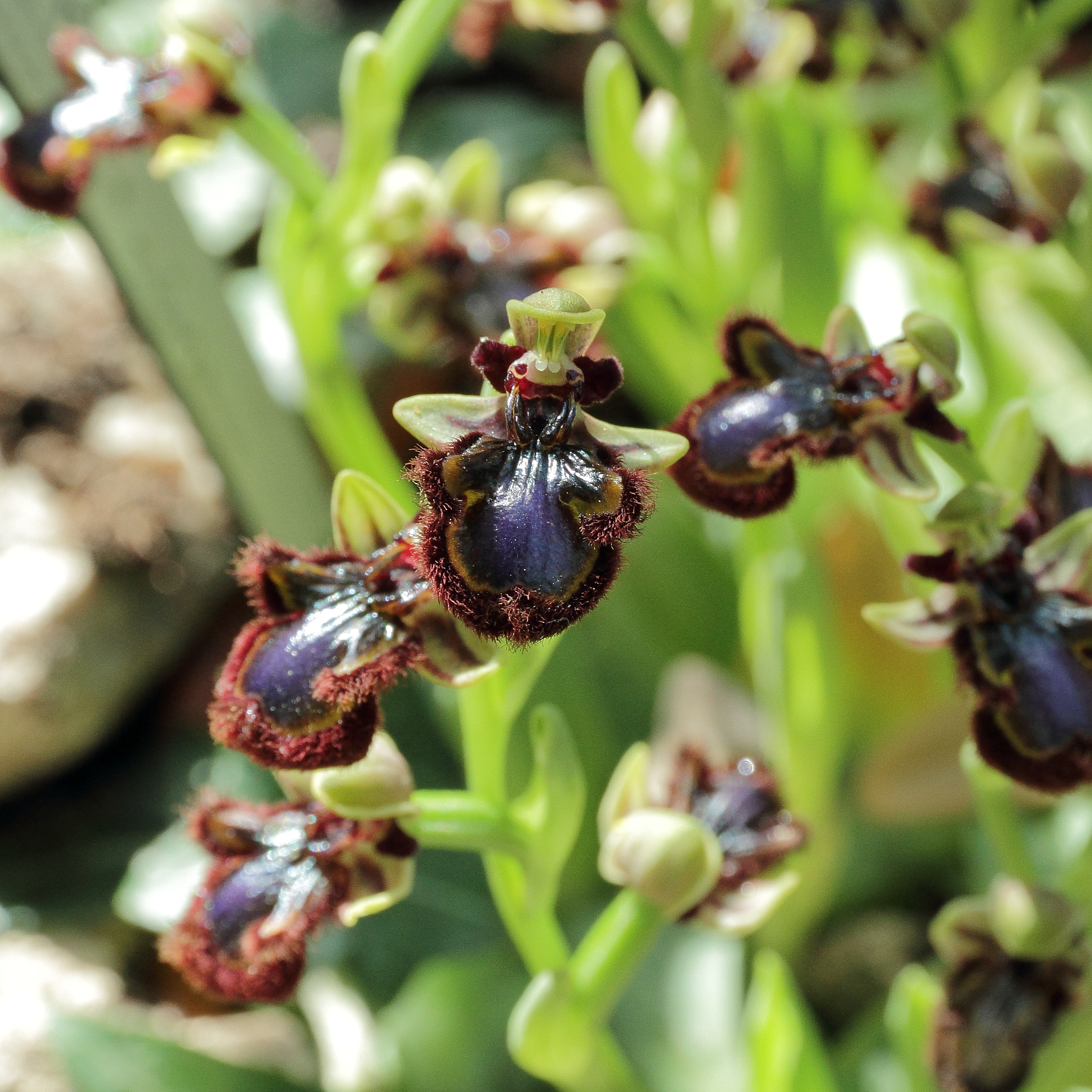
Ophrys speculum flowers

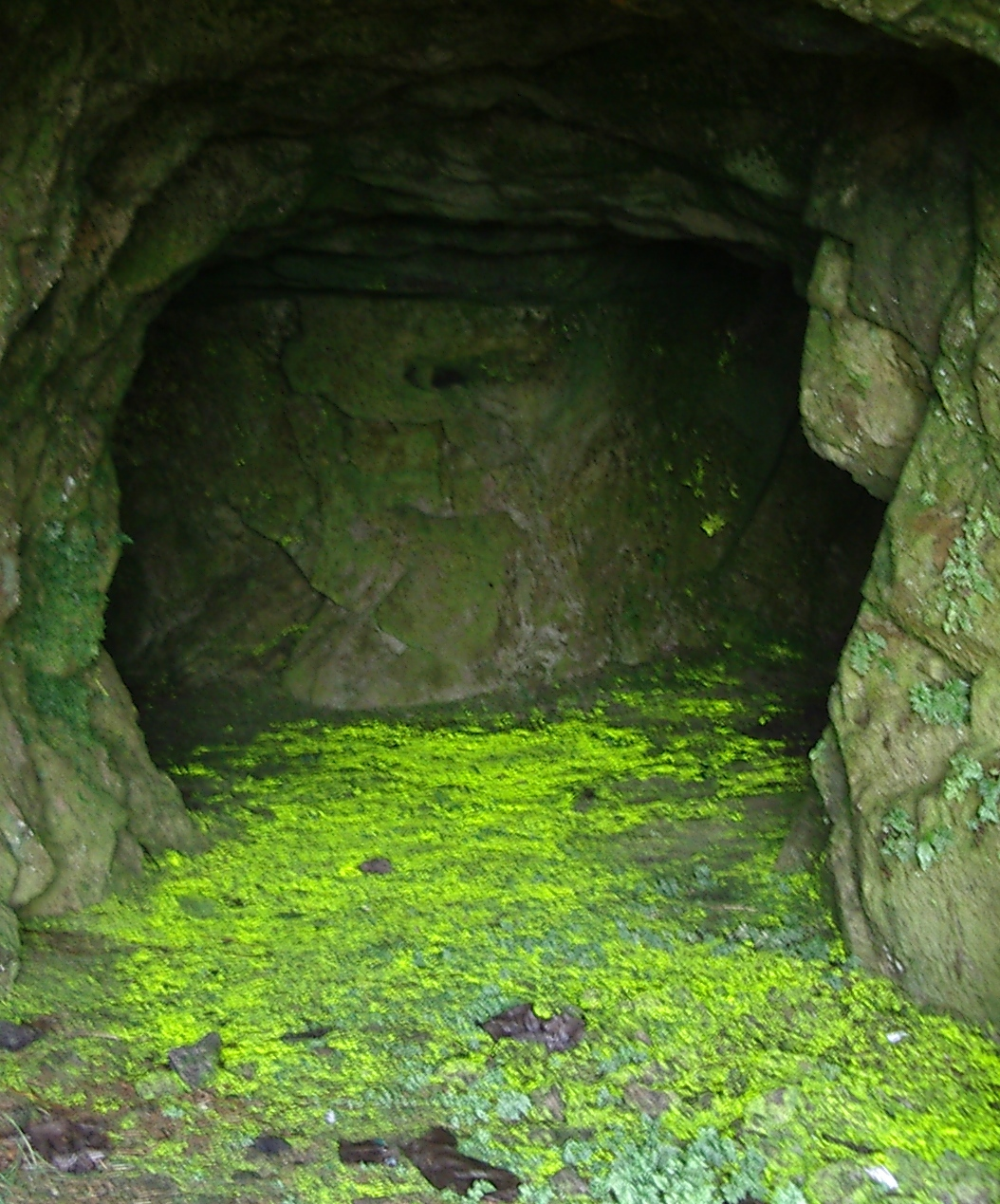
Schistostega pennata

=== Animals ===
==== Invertebrates ====
Eledone moschata has a bluish iridescence running along its body and tentacles.

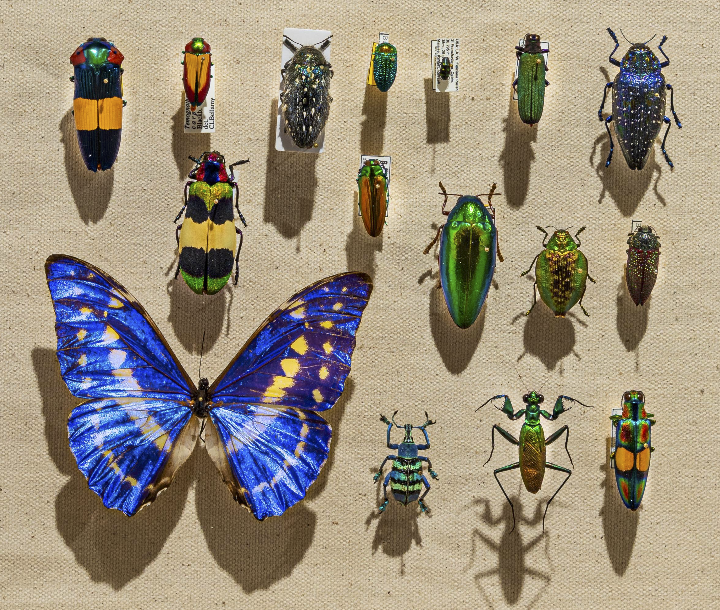
Cornell drawer displaying iridescent insects

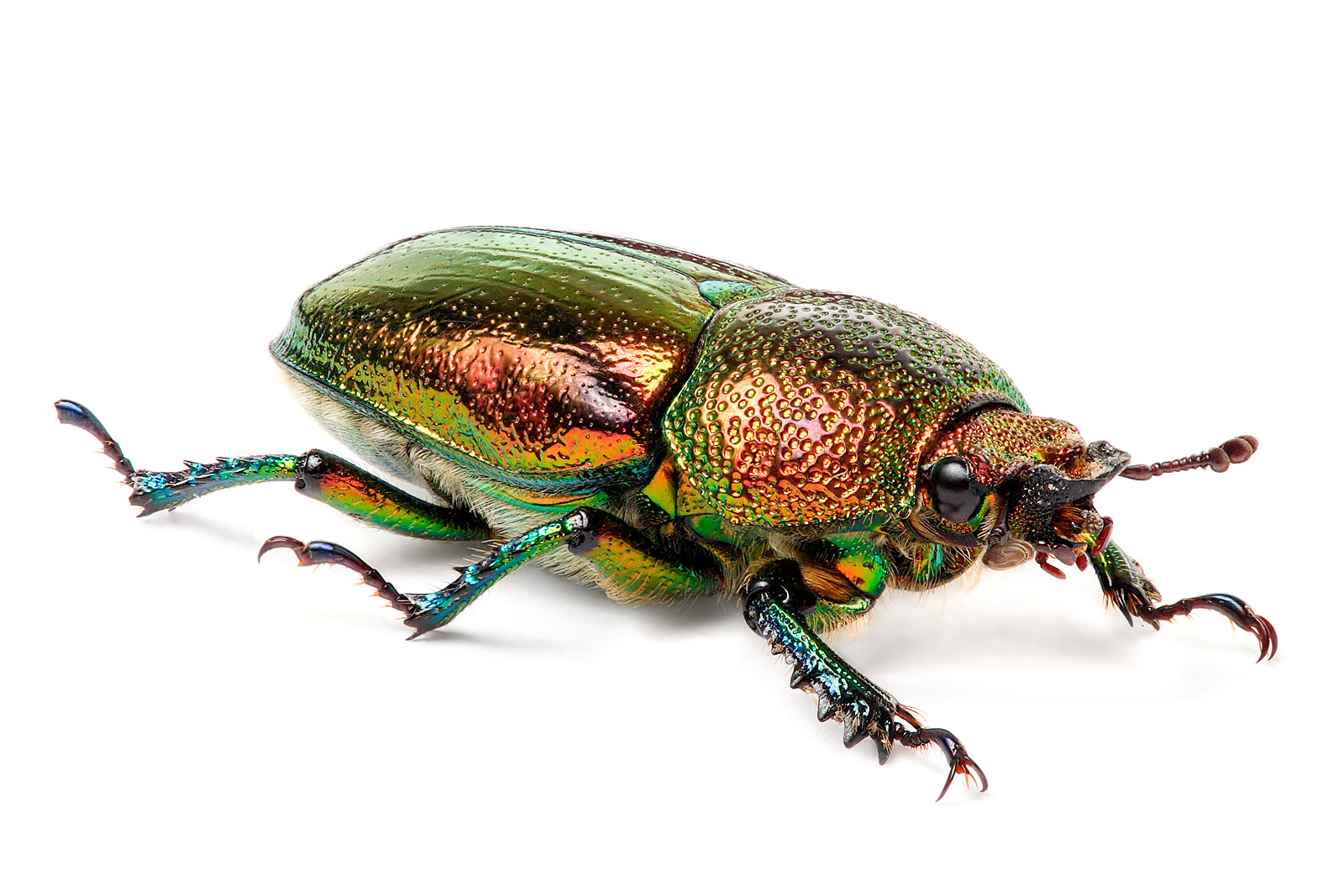
The iridescent exoskeleton of a golden stag beetle

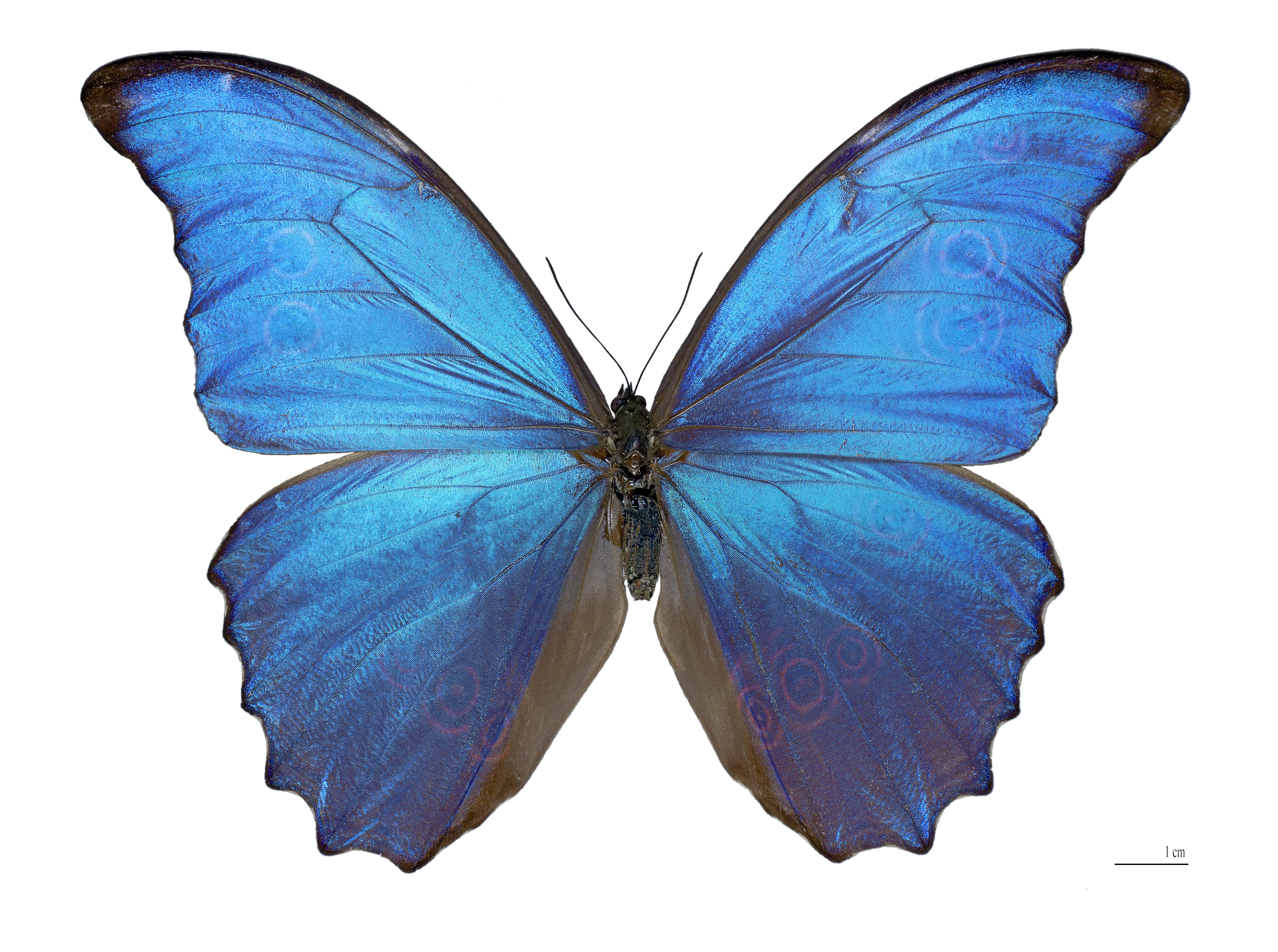
Structurally coloured wings of Morpho didius

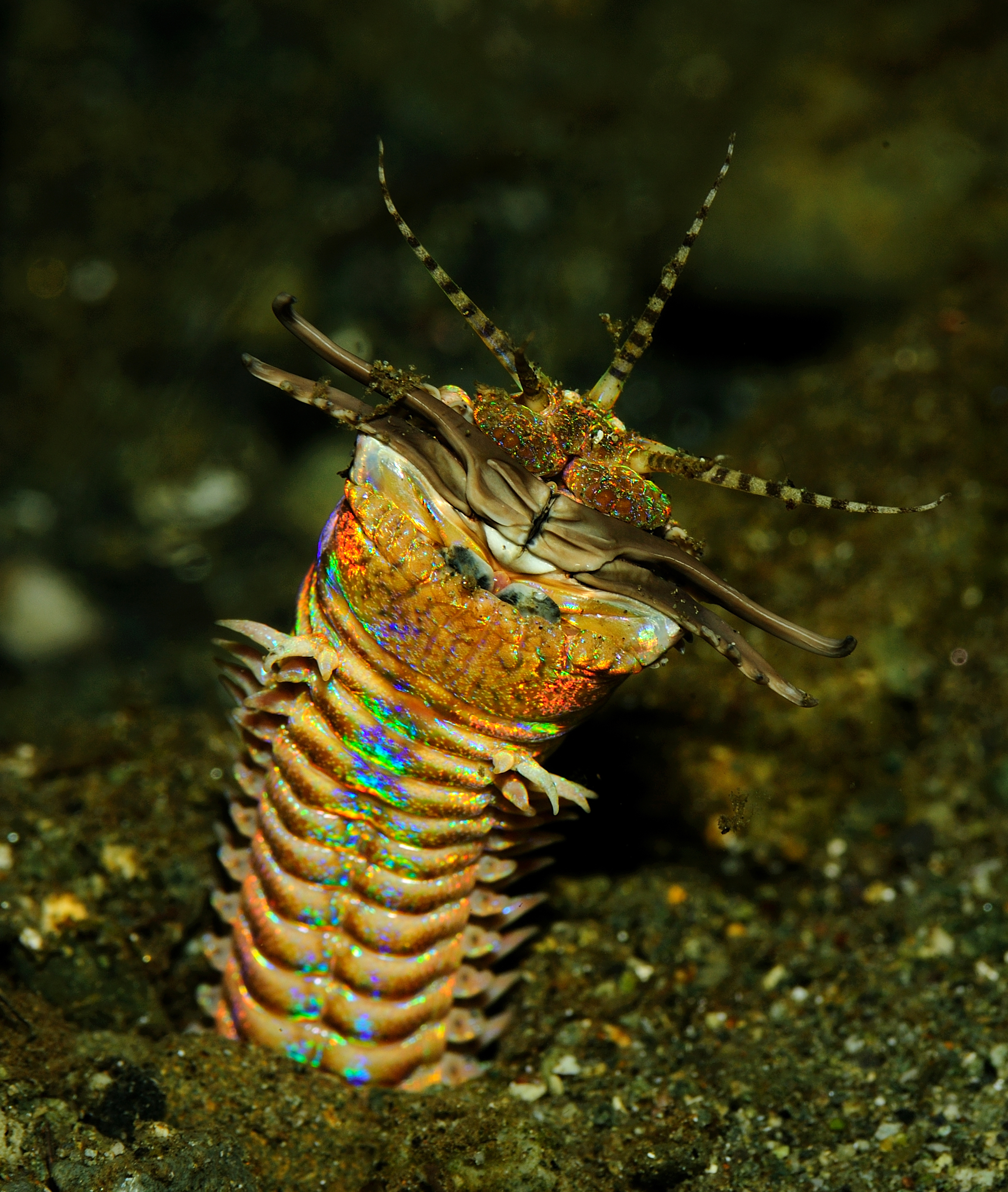
The iridescent skin of the bristleworm Eunice aphroditois

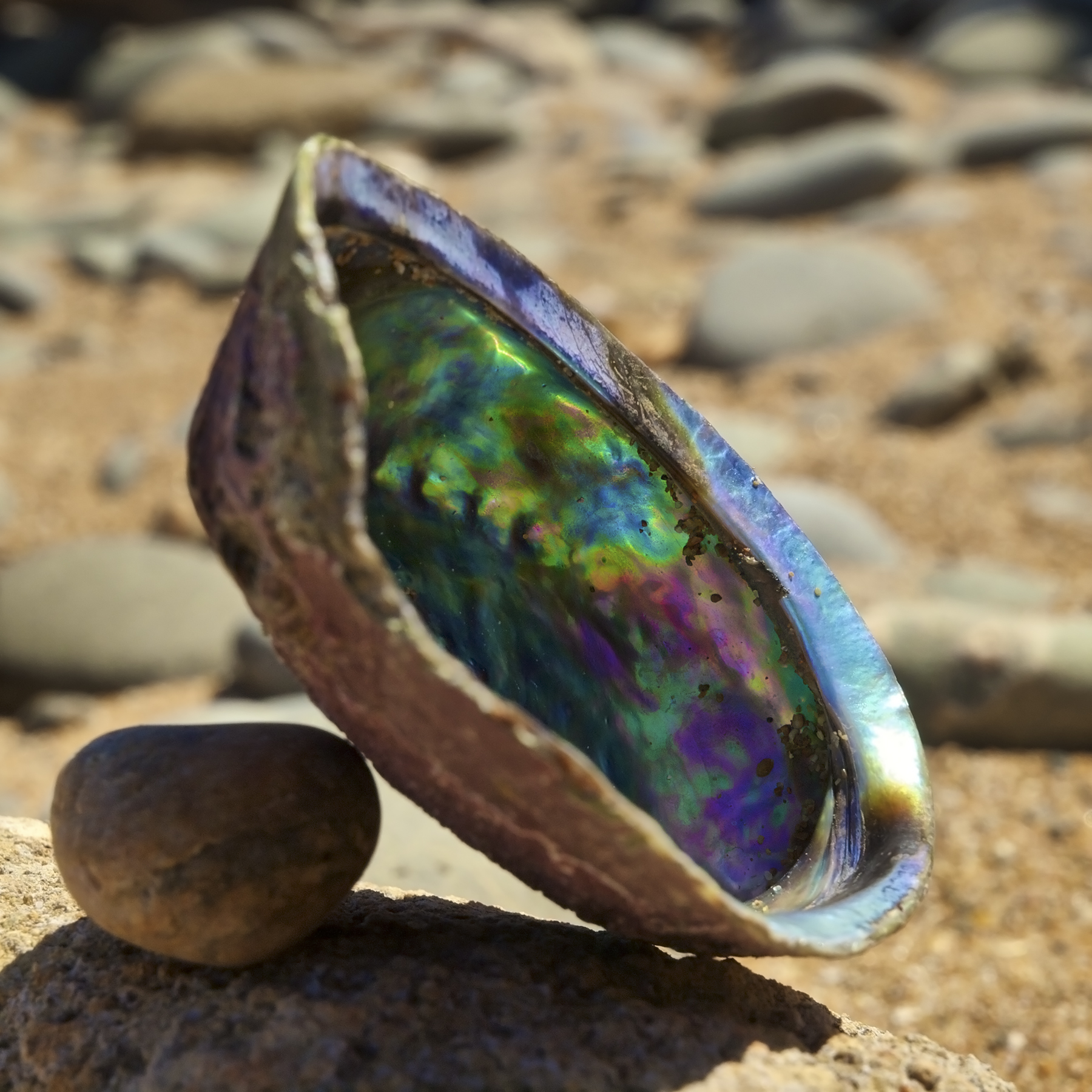
The inside surface of Haliotis iris, the paua shell

==== Vertebrates ====
The feathers of birds such as kingfishers, birds-of-paradise, hummingbirds, parrots, starlings, grackles, ducks, and peacocks are iridescent. The iridescence is created by ordered arrays of melanosomes within feather barbules; also hollow melanosomes, which are largely restricted to birds, enhance colour brightness by increasing the refractive-index contrast between melanin, keratin, and the air-filled central cavity of the organelle. The lateral line on the neon tetra is also iridescent. A single iridescent species of gecko, Cnemaspis kolhapurensis, was identified in India in 2009. The tapetum lucidum, present in the eyes of many vertebrates, is also iridescent. Iridescence is known to be present among prehistoric non-avian and avian dinosaurs such as dromaeosaurids, enantiornithes, and lithornithids. Muscle tissues can display irisdescence.

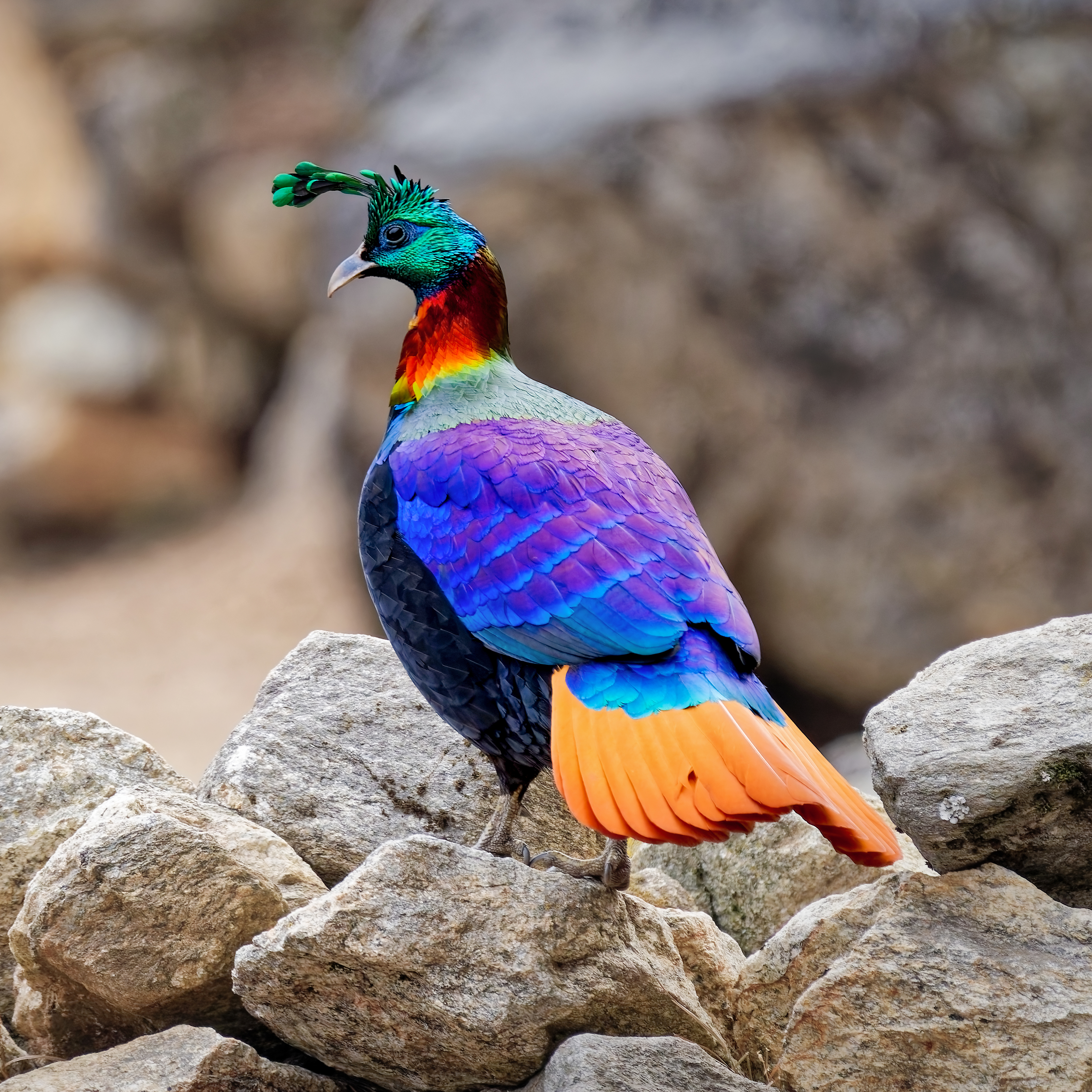
A Himalayan monal in Sagarmatha National Park, Nepal

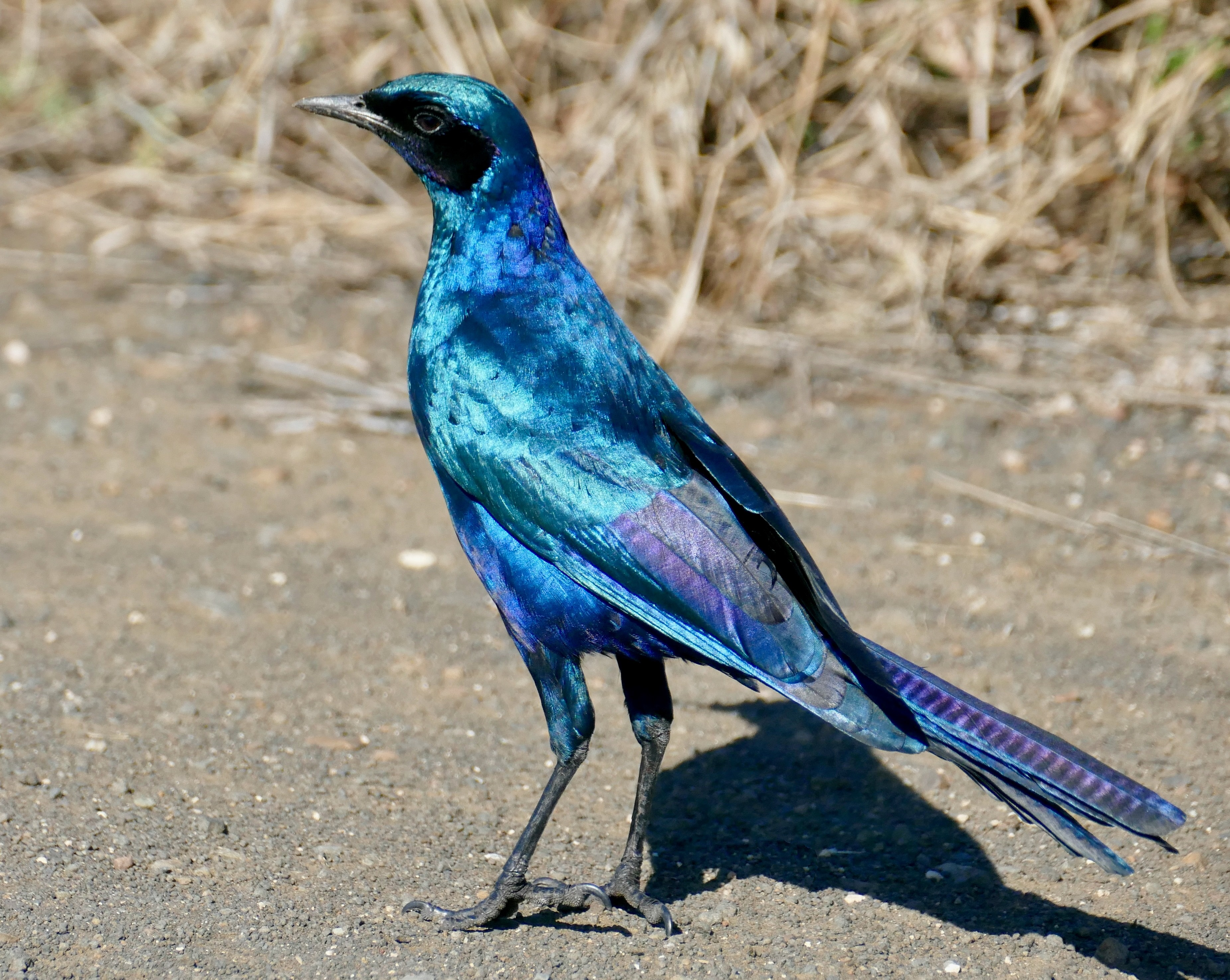
Burchell's starling Lamprotornis australis has exceptional iridescence

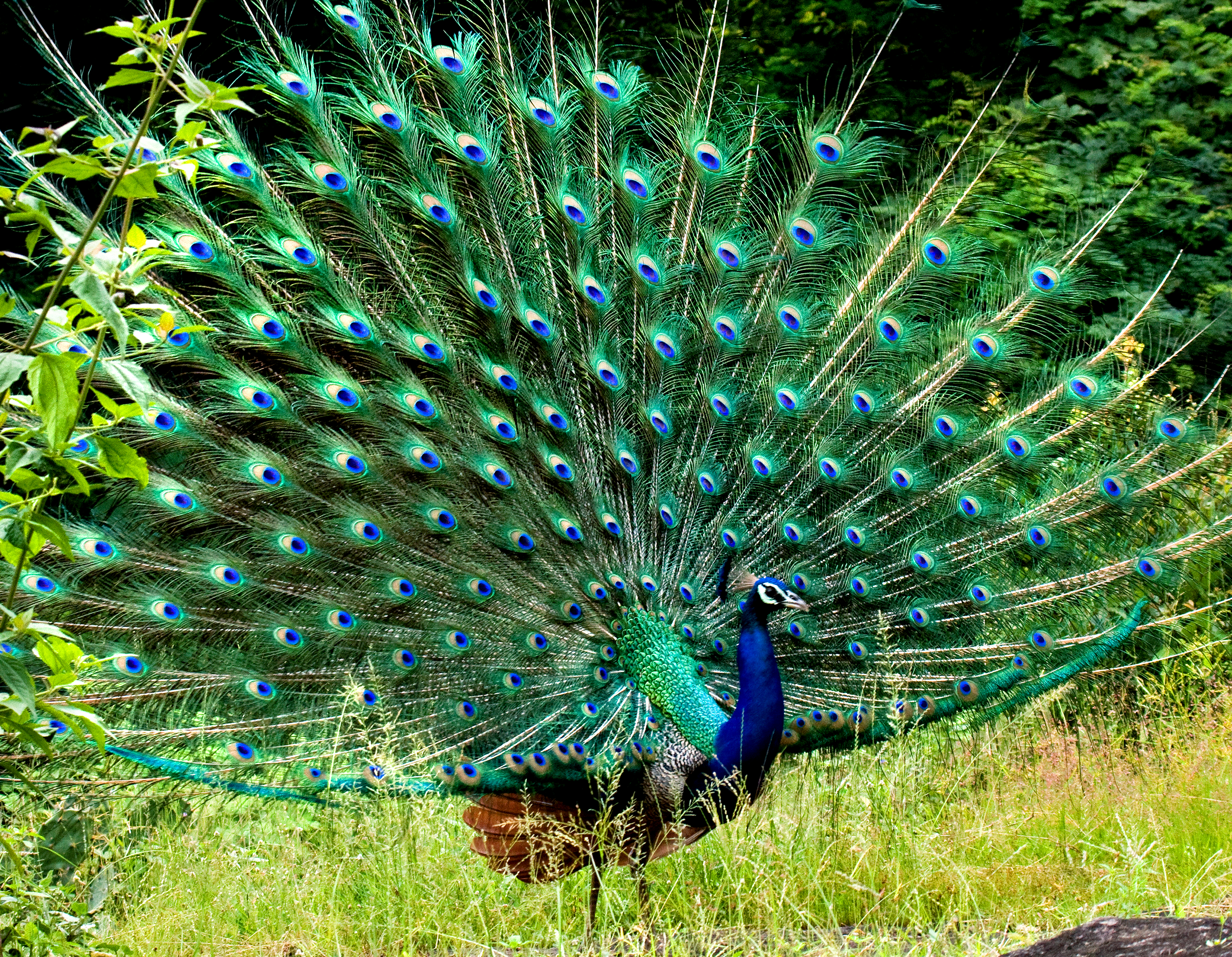
Both the body and the train of the peacock are iridescent

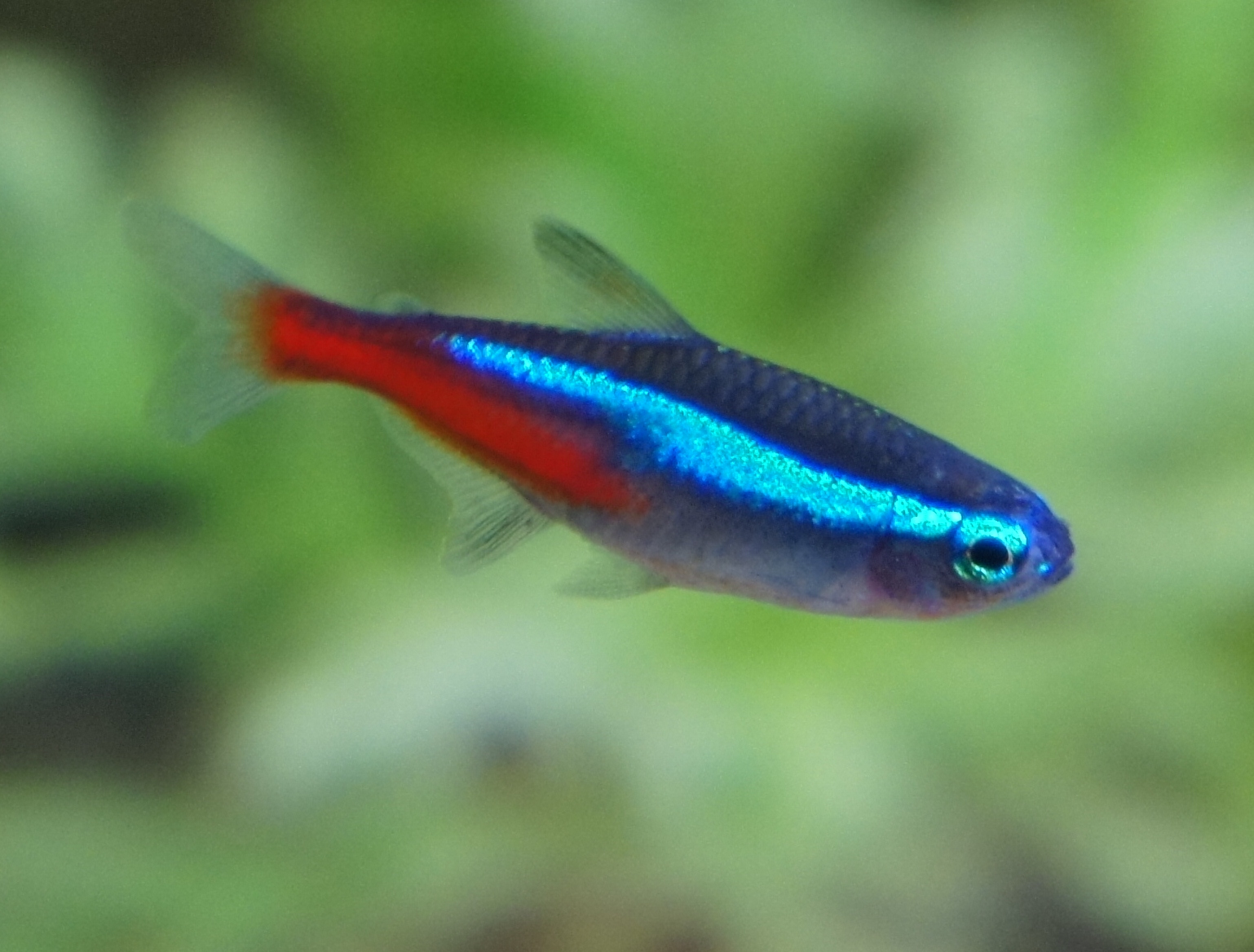
A neon tetra

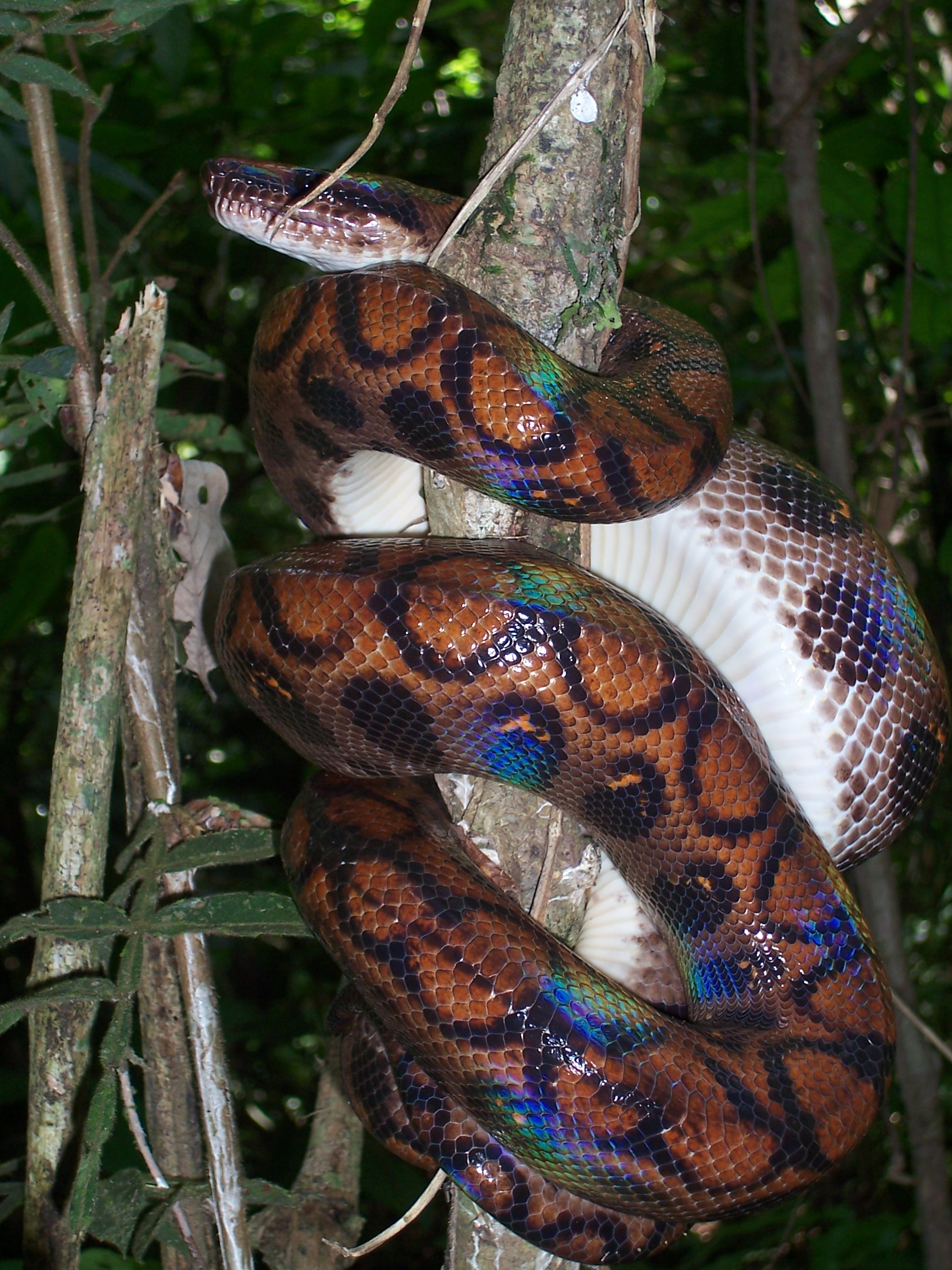
The rainbow boa

==== Bacteria ====
Colonies of Cellulophaga lytica and Flavobacterium are iridescent. The same cellular organisation that creates iridescence in Flavobacterium is believed to help with pack hunting.

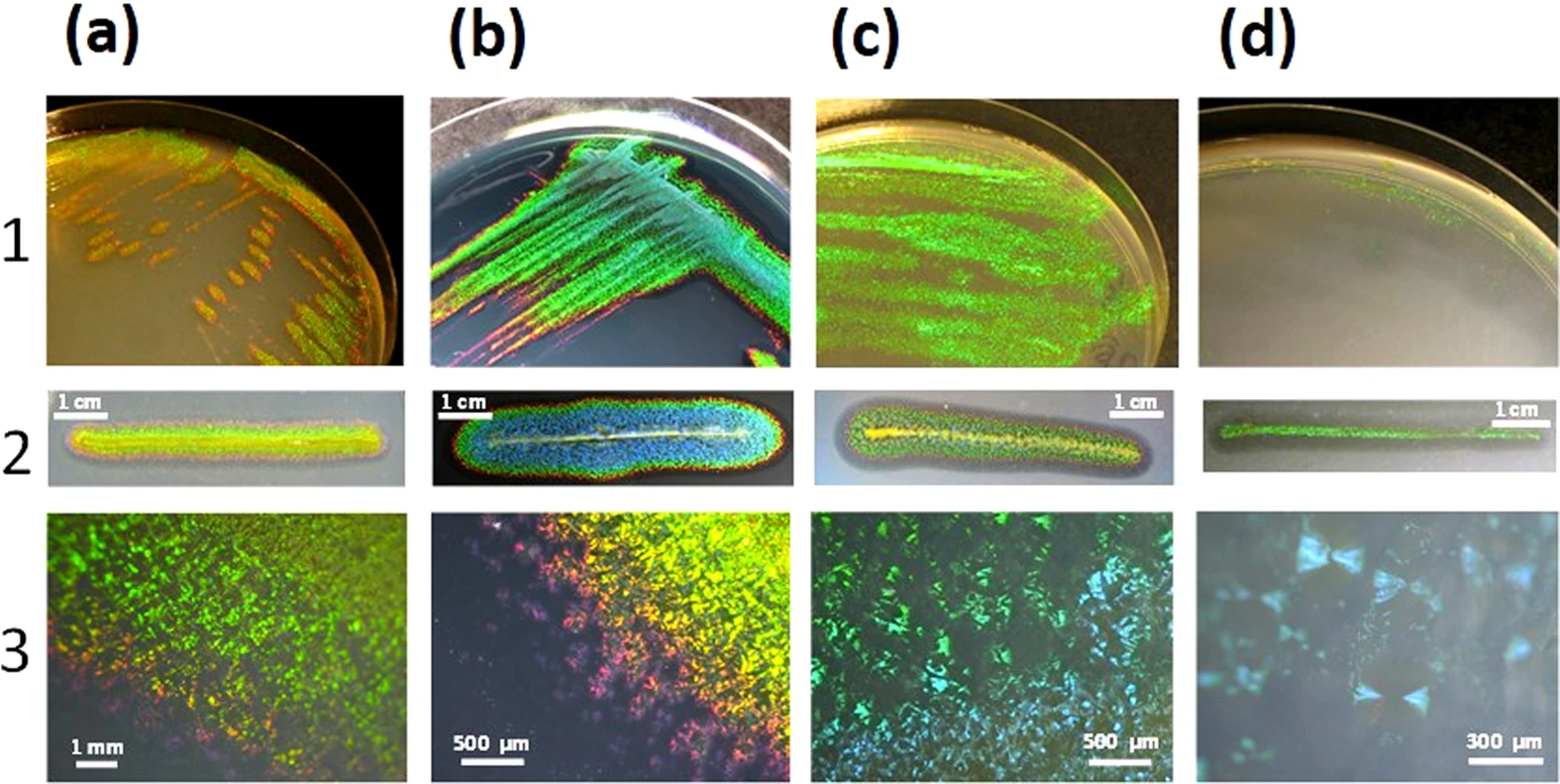
Cellulophaga lytica

=== Non-biological ===
==== Minerals ====
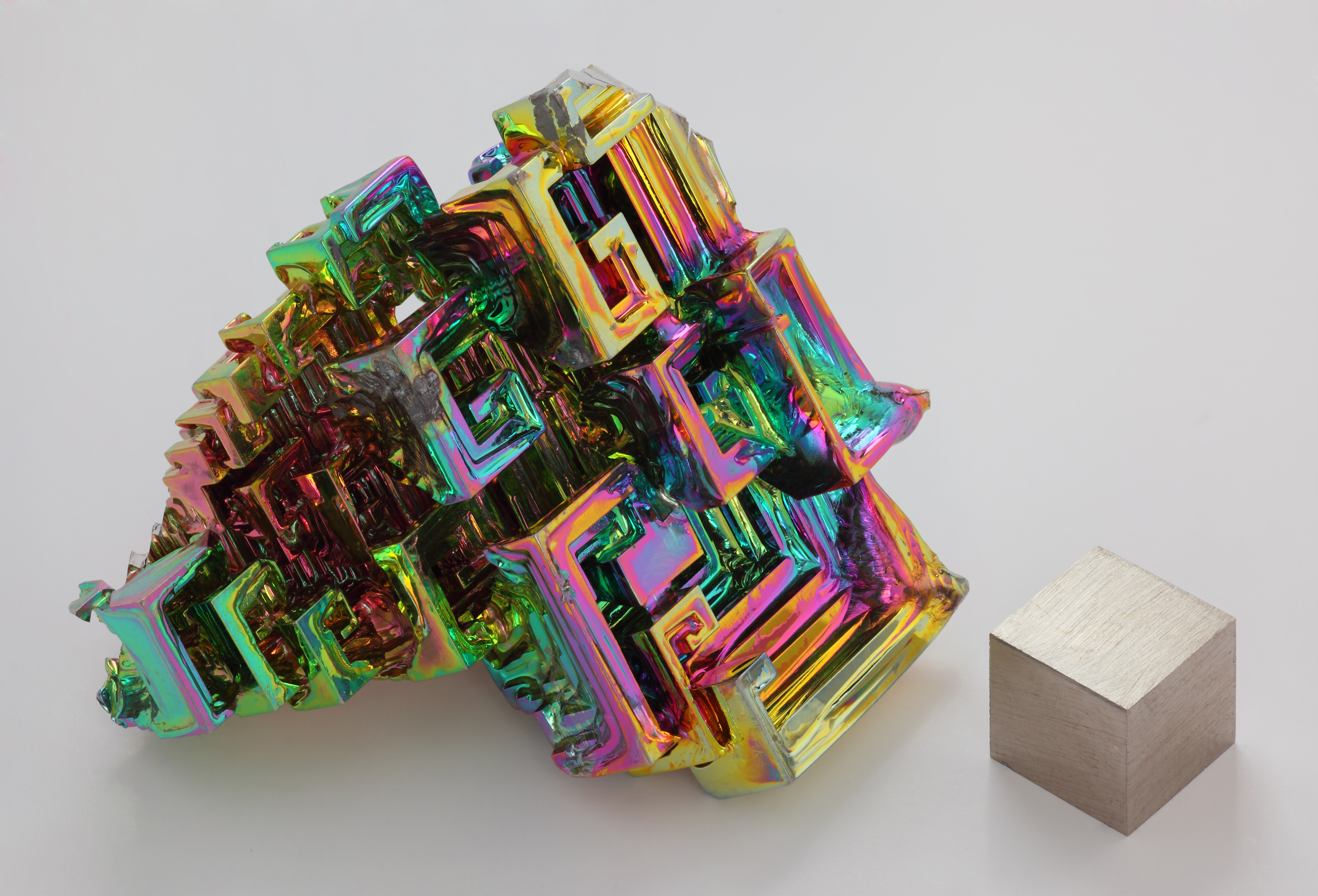
A bismuth crystal with a thin iridescent layer of bismuth oxide, with a whitish-silver bismuth cube for comparison

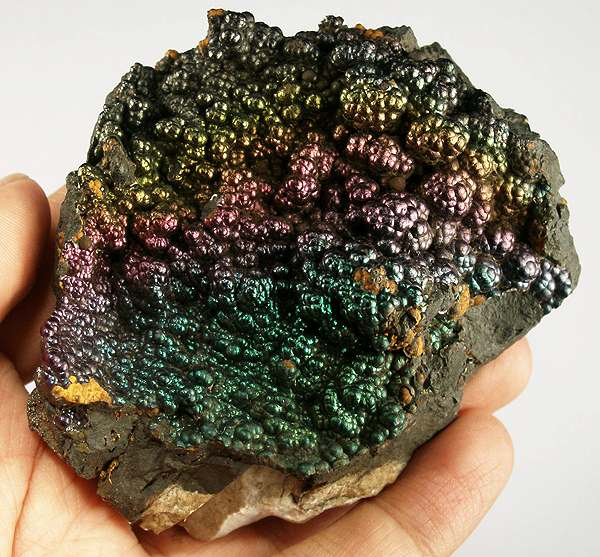
Goethite, an iron(III) oxide-hydroxide, from Polk County, Arkansas

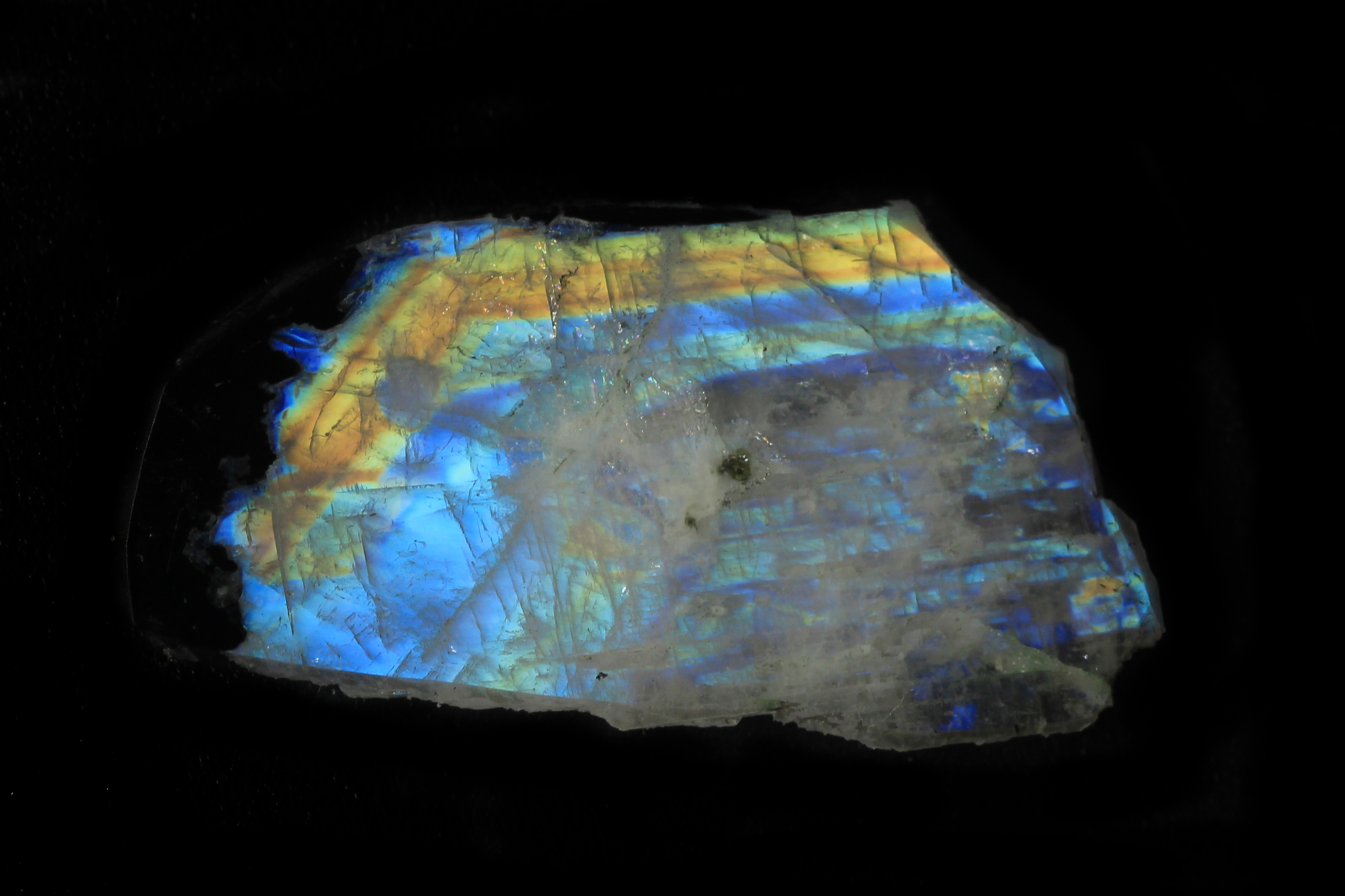
Polished labradorite

==== Meteorological ====
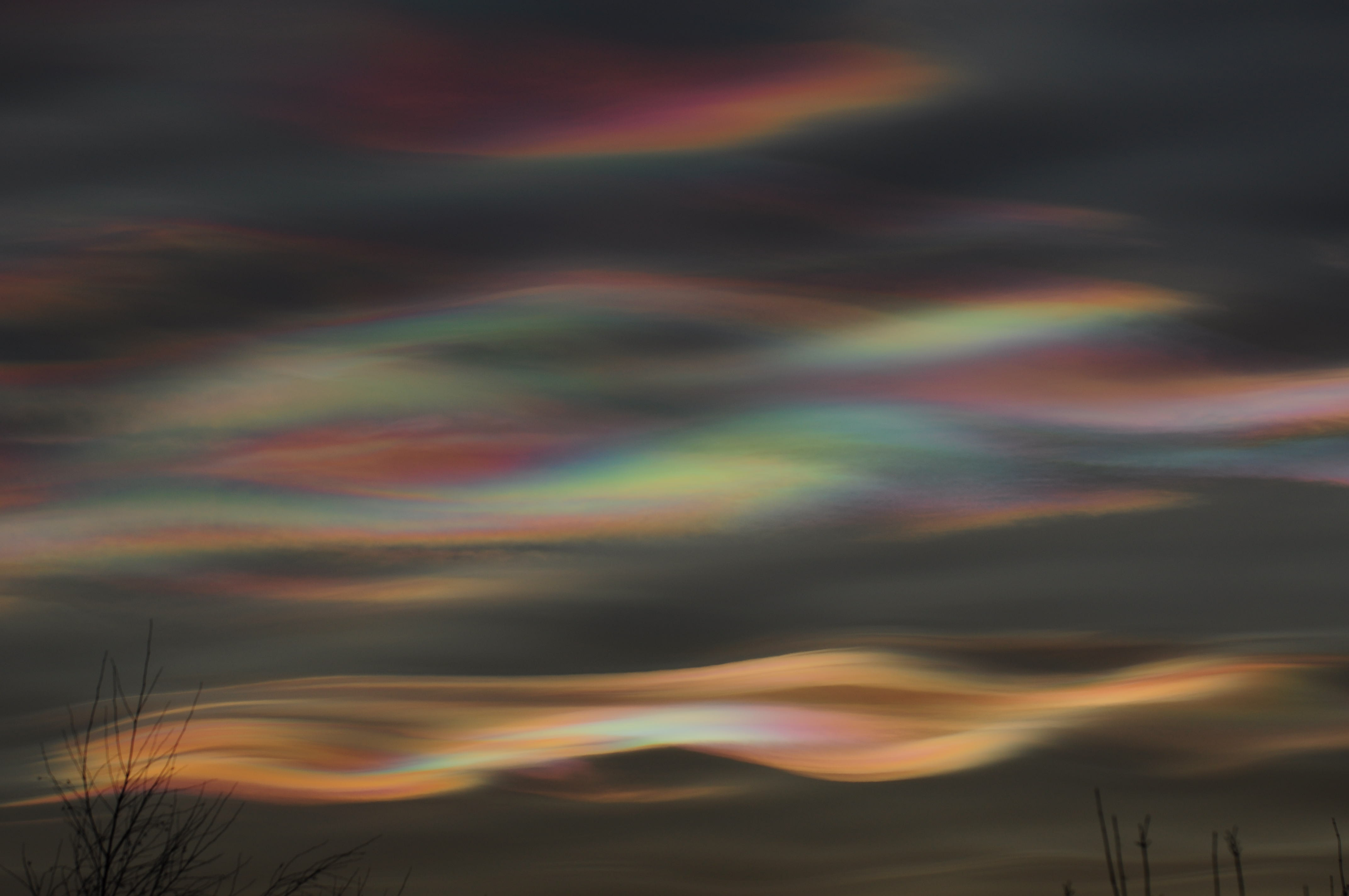
Polar stratospheric clouds displaying a nacreous iridescence

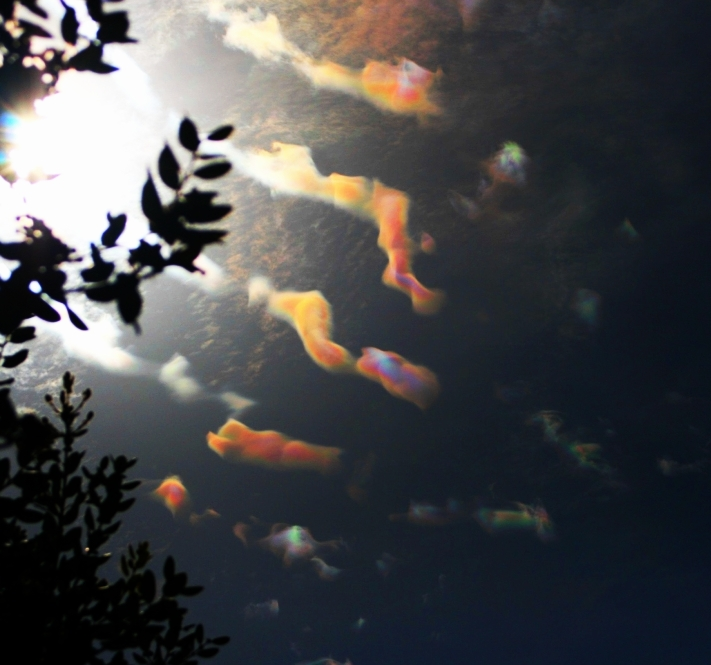
Cloud iridescence

==== Human-made ====
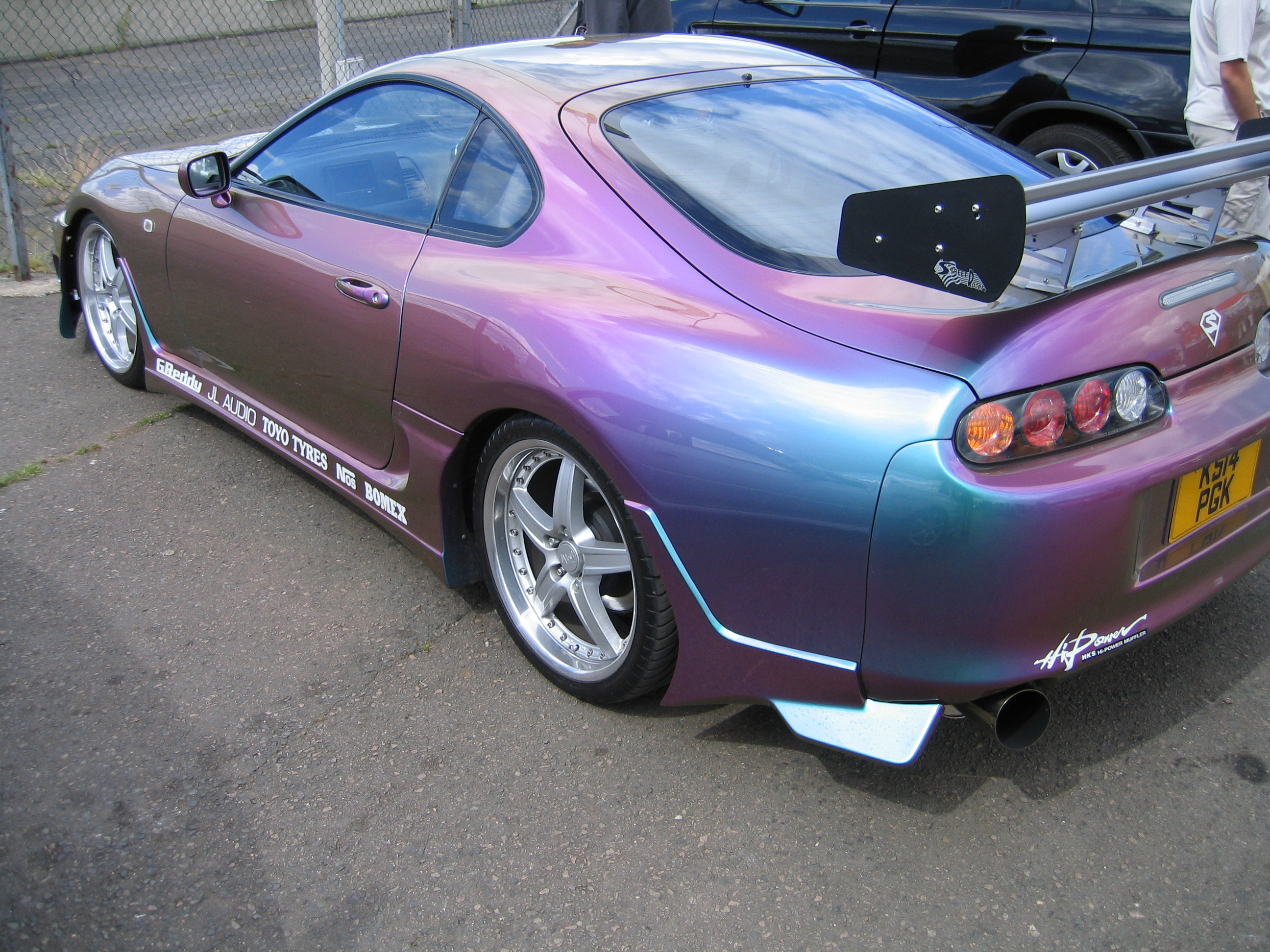
Pearlescent paint job on a Toyota Supra car

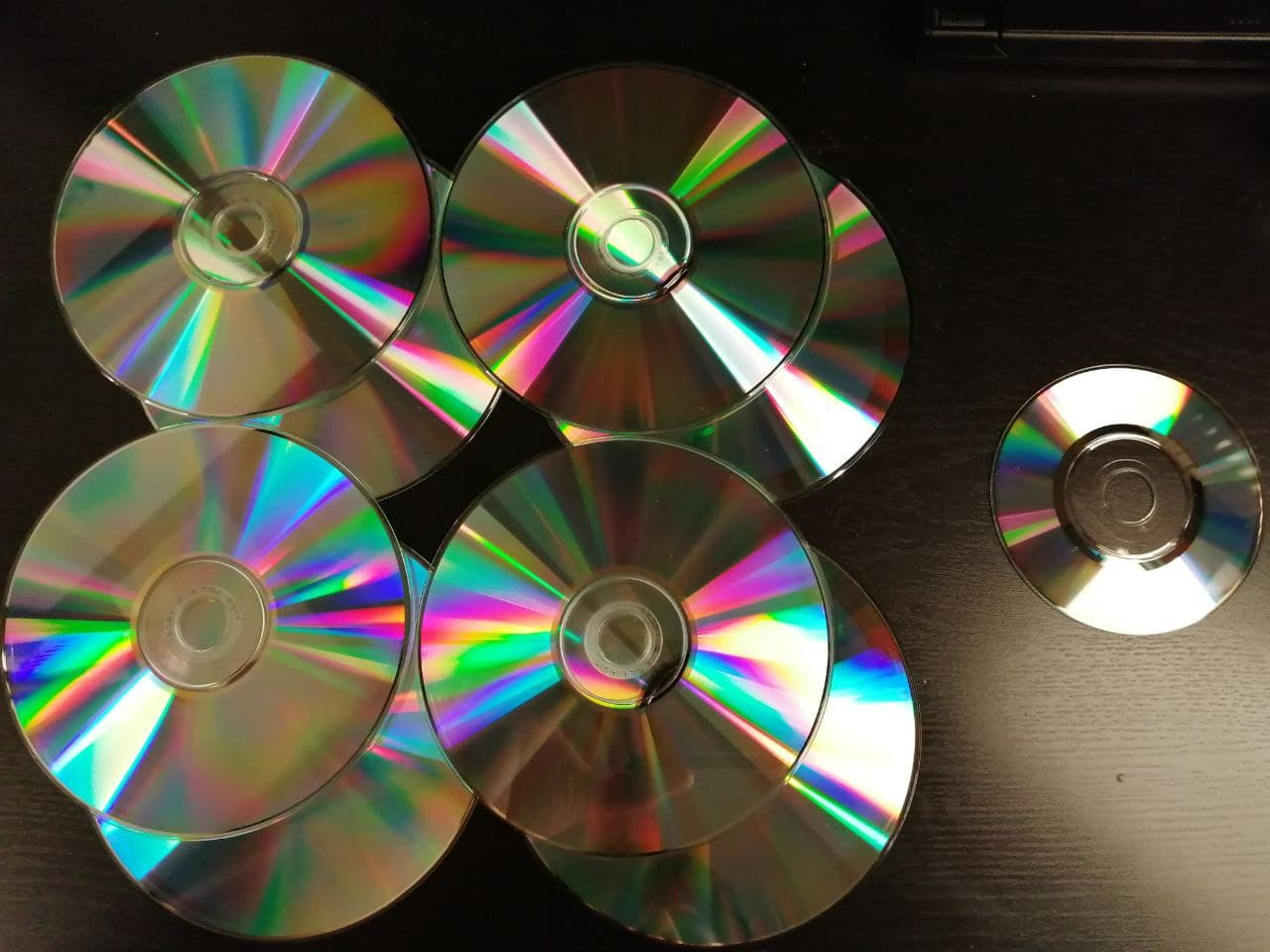
Playing surface of compact discs

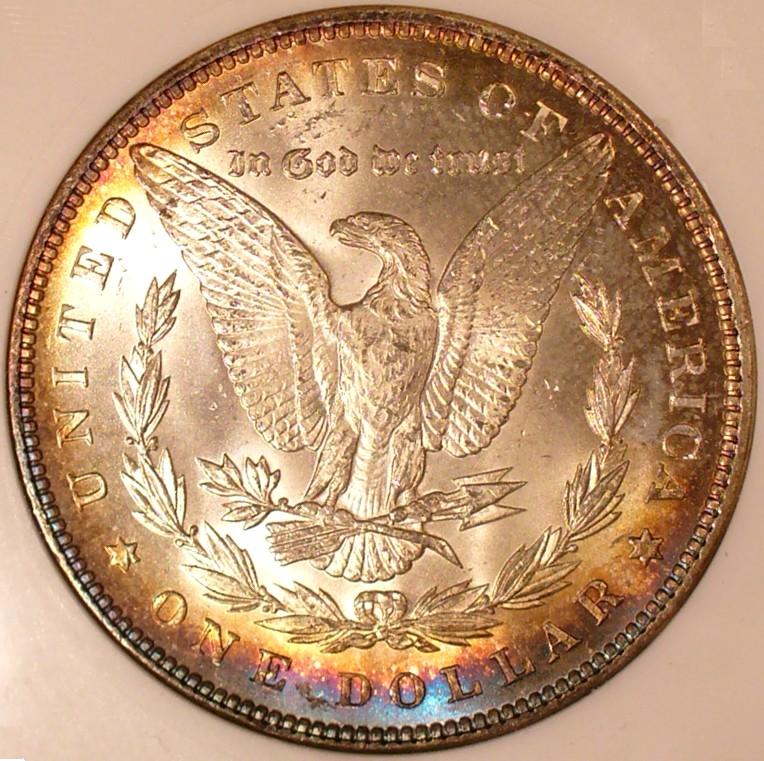
Iridescent toning on the reverse of a Morgan dollar

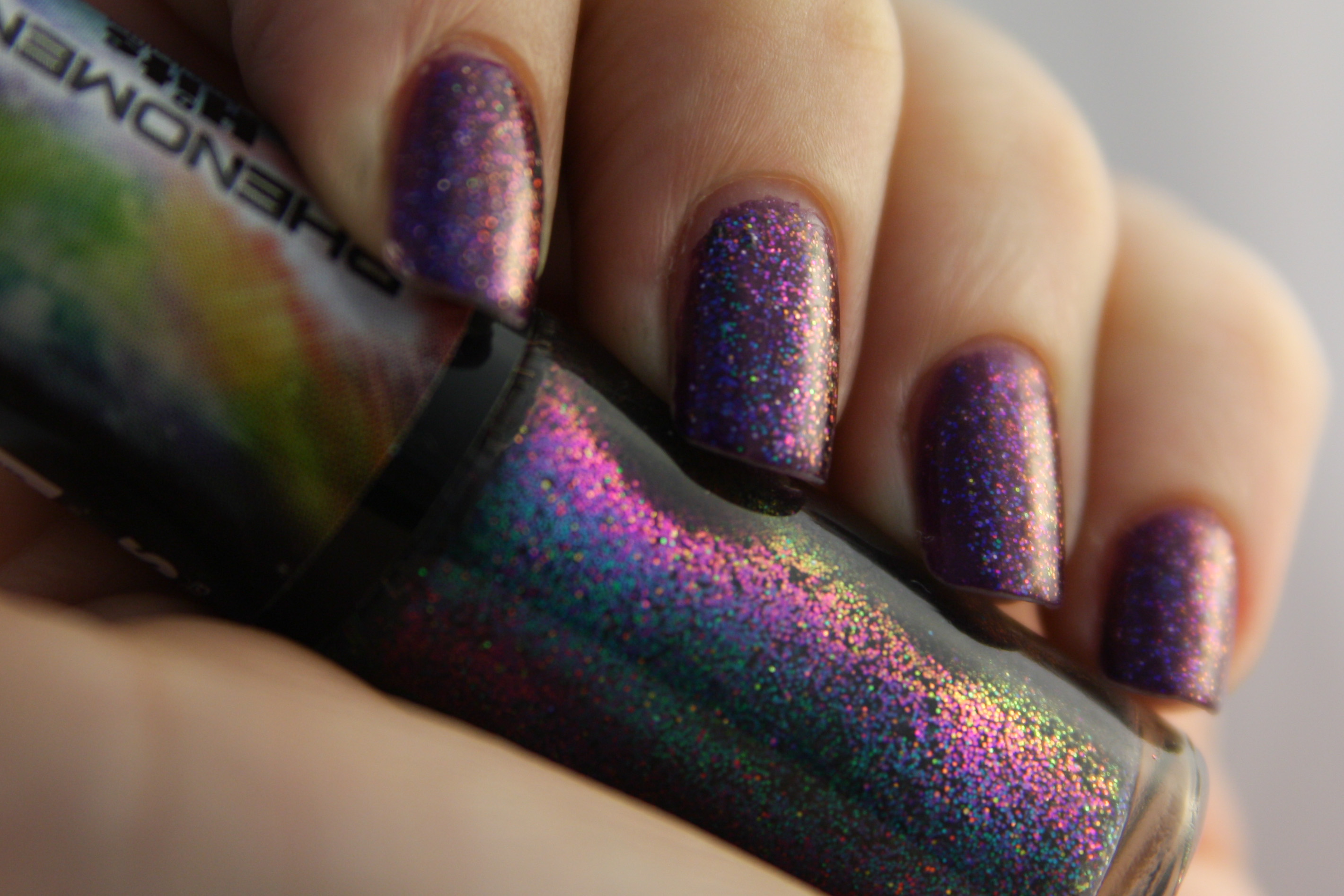
Iridescent glitter nail polish

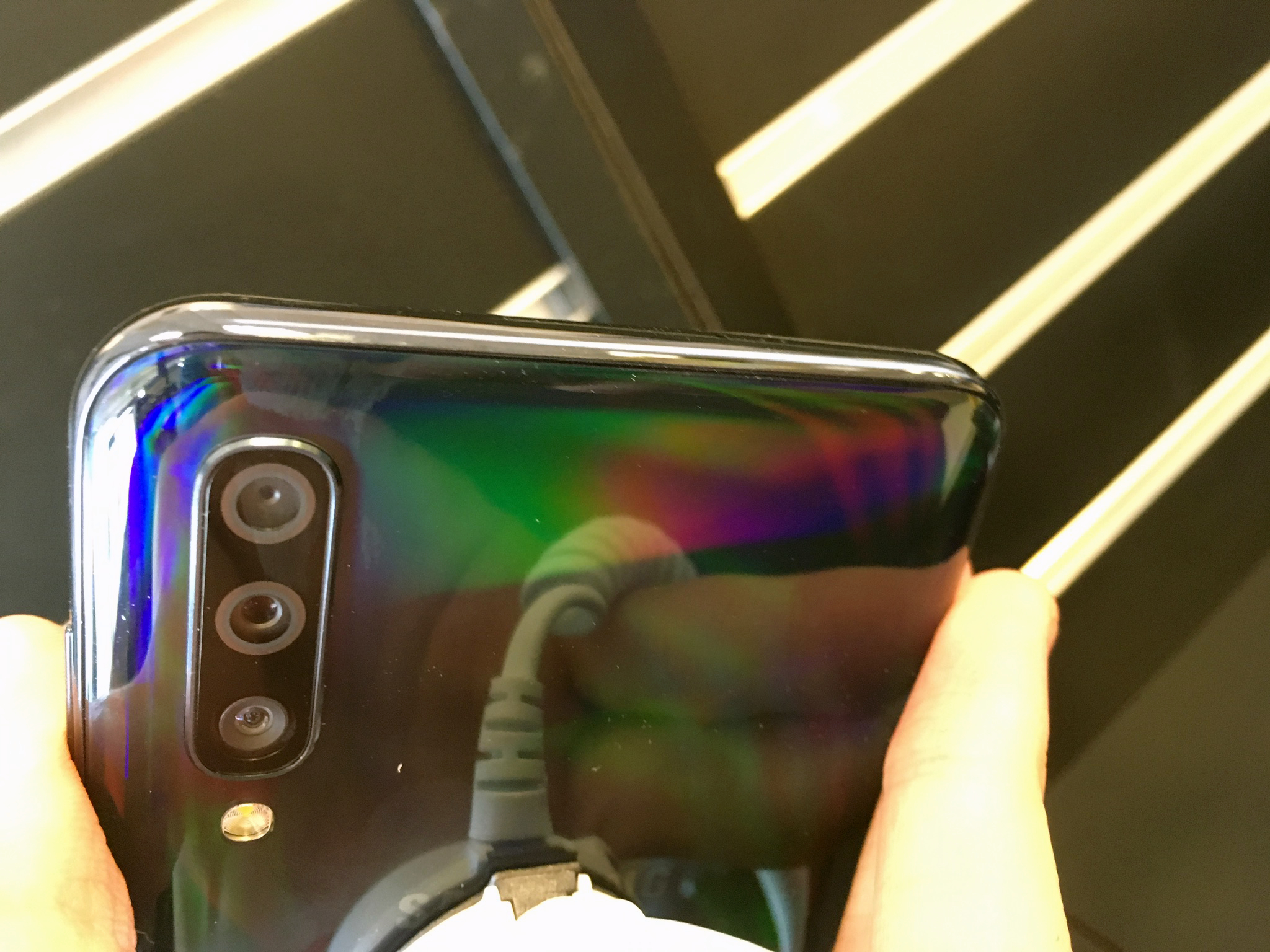
Smartphone with iridescent back panel

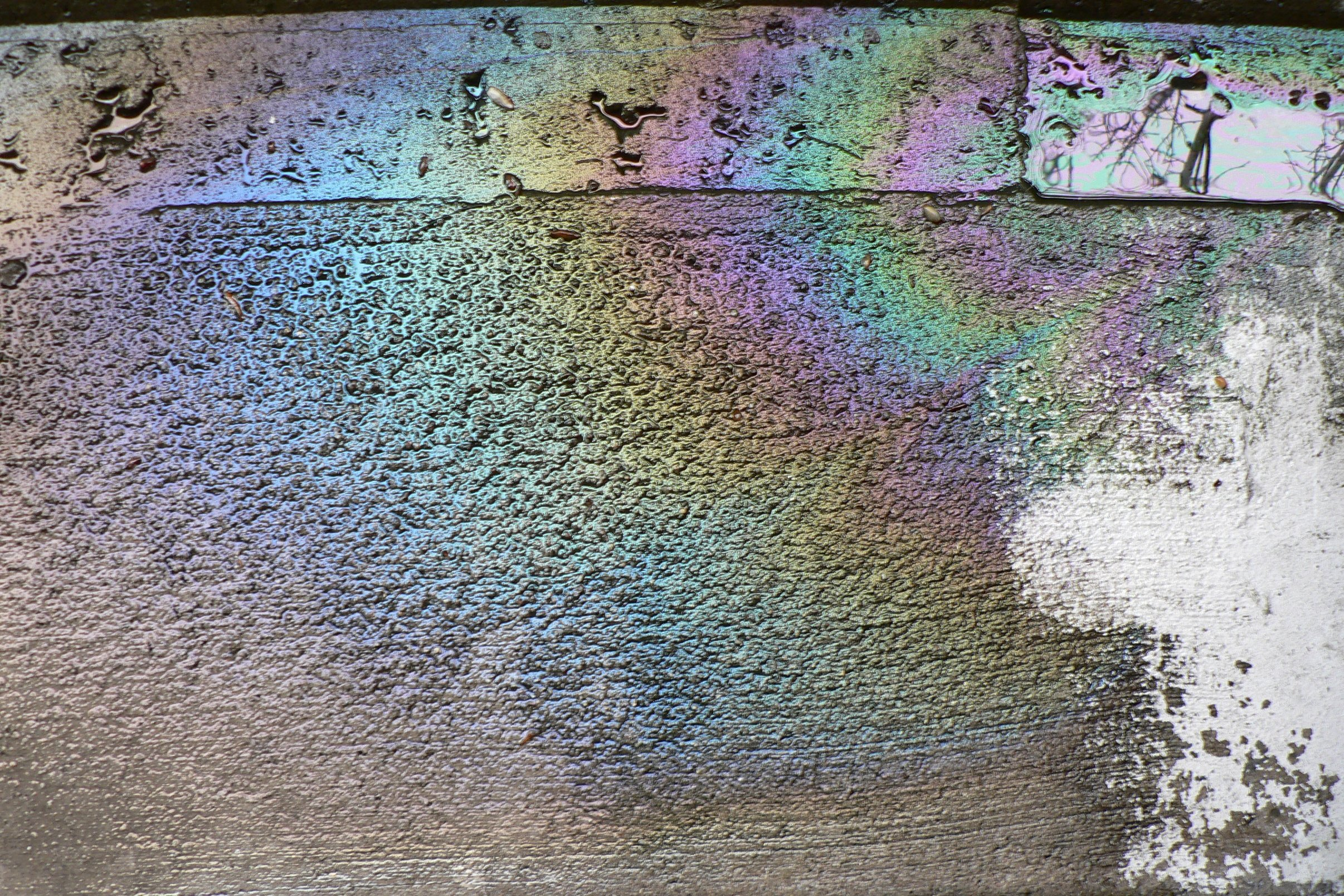
An engine oil spill

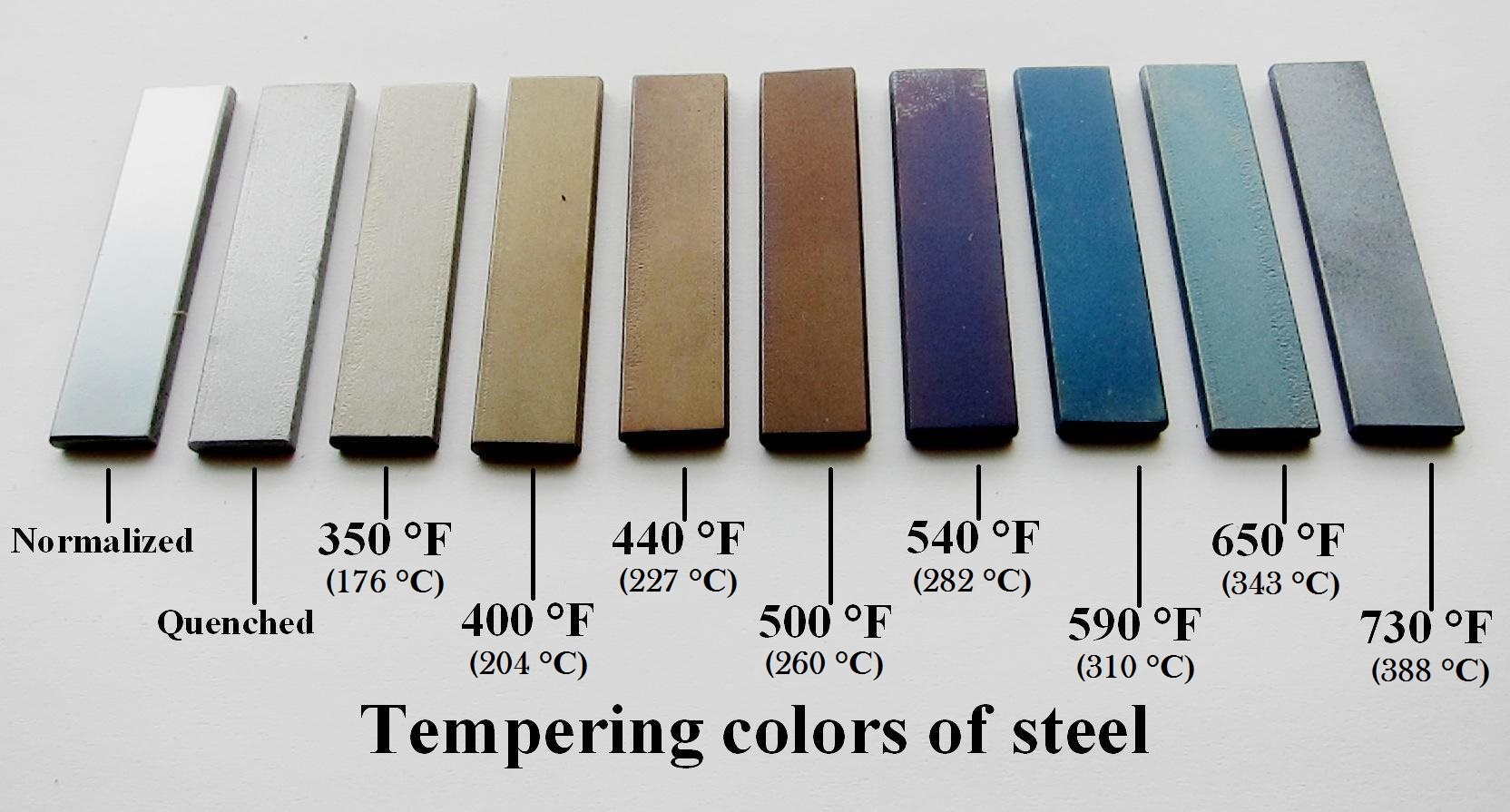
Tempering colours are formed by heating steel, forming a thin oxide film on the surface. The colour indicates the temperature it was heated to, making it one of the earliest practical uses of iridescence.

Nanocellulose is sometimes iridescent, as are thin films of petrol and some other hydrocarbons and alcohols when floating on water.

== See also ==
- Anisotropy
- Bioluminescence, irrespective of angle
- Dichroic filter
- Dichroism
- Iridocyte
- Labradorescence (Adularescence)
- Metallic colour
- Opalescence
- Structural colour
- Thin-film optics
- Nacre
- Opal
- Sparkling
