= Cellulophaga algicola =

Scientific classification
- Domain: Bacteria
- Kingdom: Pseudomonadati
- Phylum: Bacteroidota
- Class: Flavobacteriia
- Order: Flavobacteriales
- Family: Flavobacteriaceae
- Genus: Cellulophaga
- Species: C. algicola

Binomial name
- Cellulophaga algicola Bowman, 2000

Species of bacterium

Cellulophaga algicola is a bacterium. It was first isolated from the surfaces of the chain-forming sea-ice diatom Melosira. It is most similar to Cellulophaga baltica. Its type strain is IC166^{T} (= ACAM 630^{T}).
