= Cellulophaga =

Scientific classification
- Domain: Bacteria
- Kingdom: Pseudomonadati
- Phylum: Bacteroidota
- Class: Flavobacteriia
- Order: Flavobacteriales
- Family: Flavobacteriaceae
- Genus: Cellulophaga; Johansen et al. 1999

Type species
- Cellulophaga lytica

Species
- C. algicola C. baltica C. fucicola C. geojensis C. lytica C. pacifica C. tyrosinoxydans

Genus of bacteria

Cellulophaga is a Gram-negative, strictly aerobic and rod-shaped bacterial genus from the family of Flavobacteriaceae which occur in marine alga and beach mud. Cellulophaga species produce zeaxanthin.
