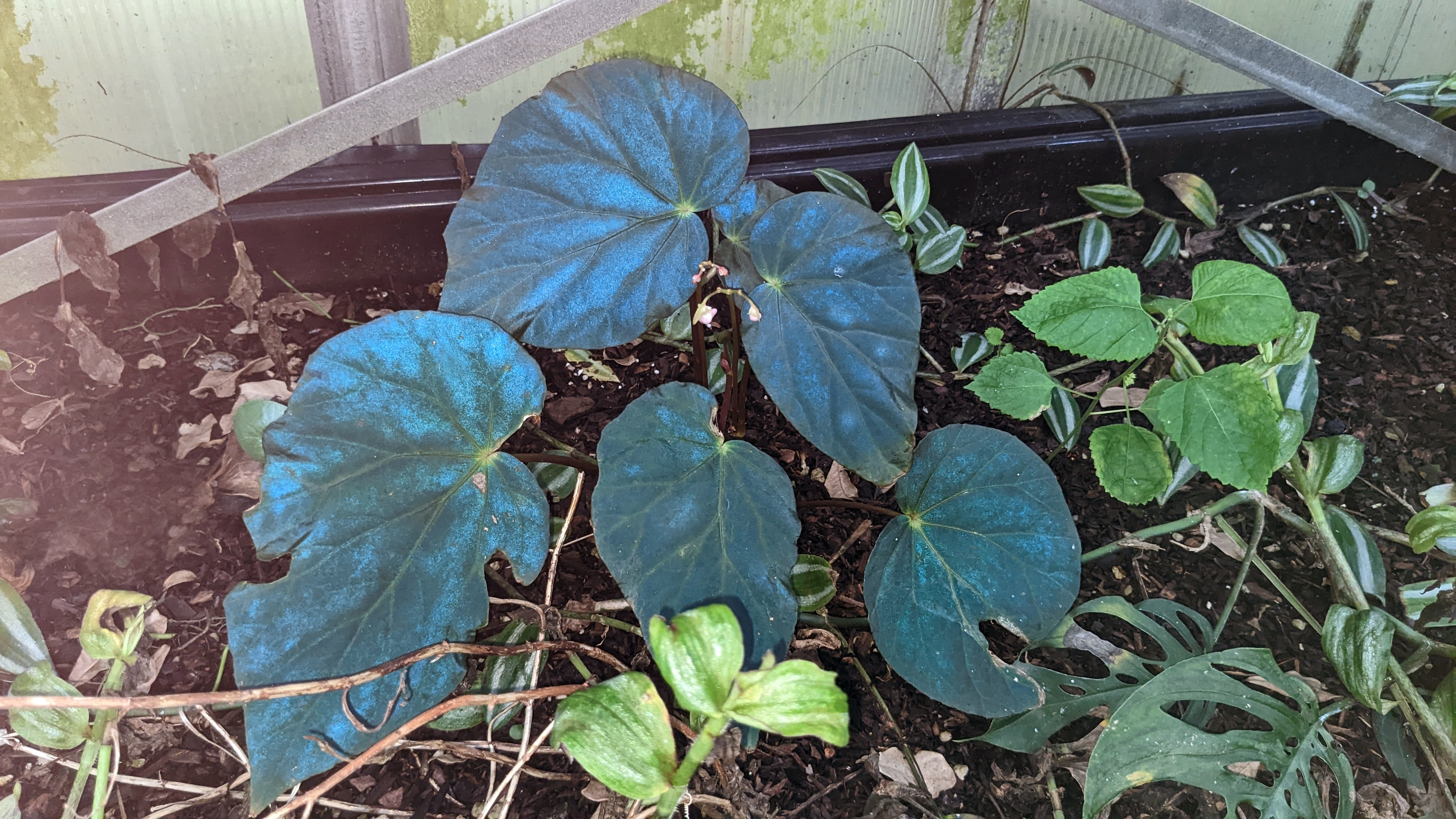

Scientific classification
- Kingdom: Plantae
- Clade: Tracheophytes
- Clade: Angiosperms
- Clade: Eudicots
- Clade: Rosids
- Order: Cucurbitales
- Family: Begoniaceae
- Genus: Begonia
- Species: B. pavonina

Binomial name
- Begonia pavonina Ridl.

= Begonia pavonina =

Species of flowering plant

Begonia pavonina, or peacock begonia, is a species of rhizomatous plant in the family Begoniaceae. It is endemic to the dim understory in the montane forests of peninsular Malaysia.

== Description ==
The plant is characterized by its iridescent foliage that reflects blue light to capture as much as light as possible in the undergrowth of the dense forests where it lives.

== Distribution ==
This rhizomatous begonia is a native to the Pahang region of Malaysia, growing in the tropical forests of Southeast Asia.
