= Kolhapur day gecko =

Conservation status
- Data Deficient (IUCN 3.1)

Scientific classification
- Kingdom: Animalia
- Phylum: Chordata
- Class: Reptilia
- Order: Squamata
- Suborder: Gekkota
- Family: Gekkonidae
- Genus: Cnemaspis
- Species: C. kolhapurensis

Binomial name
- Cnemaspis kolhapurensis (Giri, Bauer & Gaikwad, 2009)

Species of lizard

The Kolhapur day gecko (Cnemaspis kolhapurensis) is a species of gecko described from the hills in Kolhapur in Maharashtra, India.
