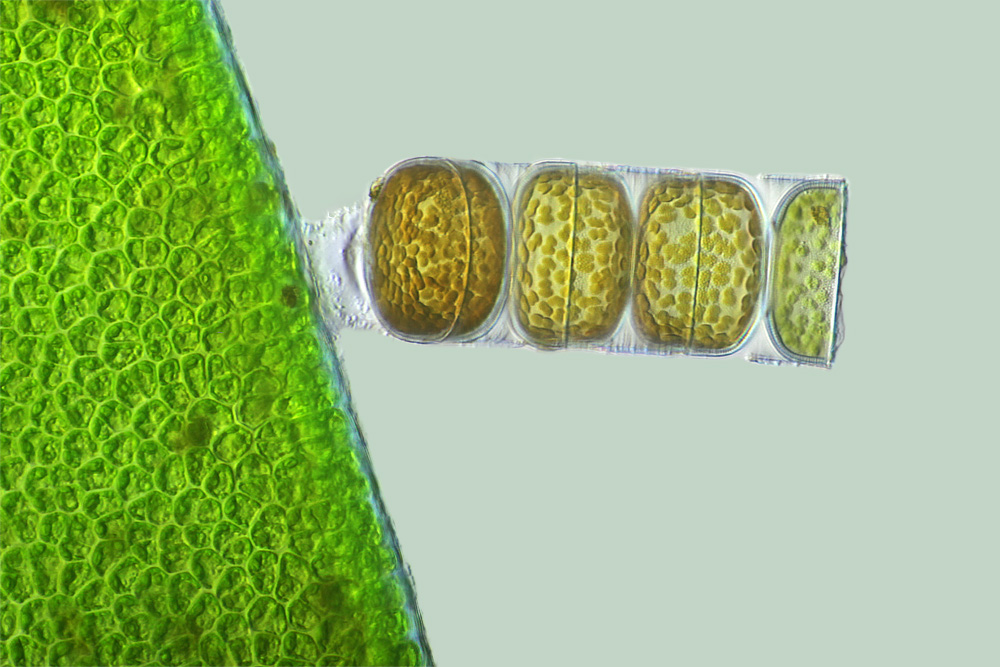
- Melosira monoliformis

Scientific classification
- Domain: Eukaryota
- Clade: Sar
- Clade: Stramenopiles
- Division: Ochrophyta
- Clade: Bacillariophyta
- Class: Melosirophyceae
- Order: Melosirales
- Family: Melosiraceae
- Genus: Melosira; C.A. Agardh, 1824

Synonyms
- Gaillonella J.B.M. Bory de Saint-Vincent, 1825

= Melosira =

Genus of diatoms

Melosira is a genus of diatoms belonging to the family Melosiraceae.

The genus has cosmopolitan distribution, and inhabits both freshwater and marine habitats.

Melosira is considered as meroplankton, as they remain free-floating like planktons for a certain stage in their life cycle.

== Species ==
Species:

- Gaillonella ampla Dujardin, 1842
- Gaillonella apiculata Ehrenberg, 1855
- Gaillonella asperula Ehrenberg, 1844
- Gaillonella biseriata Ehrenberg, 1842
- Gaillonella borei (Greville) Pelletan, 1889
- Gaillonella californica Ehrenberg, 1852
- Gaillonella calligera Ehrenberg, 1845
- Gaillonella campylosira Ehrenberg, 1854
- Gaillonella capsularis Dujardin, 1842
- Gaillonella carinata Ehrenberg, 1846
- Gaillonella circularis Ehrenberg, 1854
- Gaillonella coarctata Ehrenberg, 1843
- Gaillonella comoides Bory, 1827
- Gaillonella corneola Dorff, 1934
- Gaillonella coronata Ehrenberg, 1845
- Gaillonella crenata Ehrenberg, 1844
- Gaillonella crotonensis J.W. Bailey, 1854
- Gaillonella cuneata Ehrenberg, 1869
- Gaillonella curvata Ehrenberg
- Gaillonella decussata Ehrenberg, 1843
- Gaillonella digitus Ehrenberg, 1854
- Gaillonella discoplea Ehrenberg, 1854
- Gaillonella distans Ehrenberg, 1837
- Gaillonella ferruginea Ehrenberg, 1836
- Gaillonella gallica Ehrenberg, 1836
- Gaillonella gemmata Ehrenberg, 1854
- Gaillonella gibba Ehrenberg, 1843
- Gaillonella glomerata Naumann, 1922
- Gaillonella halophila Ehrenberg, 1854
- Gaillonella horologium Ehrenberg, 1843
- Gaillonella hyperborea Jorgensen, 1900
- Gaillonella irregularis Eichwald, 1844
- Gaillonella italica Ehrenberg, 1838
- Gaillonella laevis Ehrenberg, 1854
- Gaillonella laminaris Ehrenberg, 1854
- Gaillonella lineata (Dillwyn) Bory, 1838
- Gaillonella lineolata Ehrenberg, 1843
- Gaillonella lirata Ehrenberg, 1843
- Gaillonella marchica Ehrenberg, 1843
- Gaillonella marylandica Ehrenberg, 1854
- Gaillonella mesodon Ehrenberg, 1854
- Gaillonella moniliformis Bory, 1838
- Gaillonella nilotica Ehrenberg, 1852
- Gaillonella novaehollandiae Ehrenberg, 1854
- Gaillonella nummuloides Duby, 1830
- Gaillonella oculus Ehrenberg, 1844
- Gaillonella operculata Ehrenberg, 1835
- Gaillonella orichalcea Brébisson, 1838
- Gaillonella patina Ehrenberg, 1837
- Gaillonella pileata Ehrenberg, 1844
- Gaillonella plana Ehrenberg, 1845
- Gaillonella plicata Ehrenberg, 1870
- Gaillonella procera Ehrenberg, 1842
- Gaillonella punctata Ehrenberg, 1843
- Gaillonella punctigera Ehrenberg, 1842
- Gaillonella scala Ehrenberg, 1854
- Gaillonella sideropous Naumann, 1922
- Gaillonella sol Ehrenberg, 1844
- Gaillonella sphaerophora Ehrenberg, 1870
- Gaillonella spiralis Ehrenberg, 1845
- Gaillonella stellata Corda, 1840
- Gaillonella subtilis Brébisson, 1838
- Gaillonella sulcata Ehrenberg, 1838
- Gaillonella taeniata Ehrenberg, 1854
- Gaillonella tenerrima Ehrenberg, 1842
- Gaillonella tenuis Gutwinski, 1893
- Gaillonella tincta Ehrenberg, 1854
- Gaillonella tornata Ehrenberg
- Gaillonella trachealis Ehrenberg, 1854
- Gaillonella tympanum Ehrenberg, 1844
- Gaillonella umbellata Beger, 1949
- Gaillonella umbonata Ehrenberg, 1872
- Gaillonella undata Prichard, 1861
- Gaillonella undulata Ehrenberg, 1840
- Gaillonella vaginata Ehrenberg, 1854
- Gaillonella varians Ehrenberg, 1838
- Gaillonella vermicularis Brebisson, 1835
- Gaillonella virginica Ehrenberg, 1854
- Melosira accinctus Hohn & Hellerman, 1963
- Melosira aculeifera Scheschukova-Poretzkaya, 1964
- Melosira adeliae Manguin, 1957
- Melosira aequalis Agardh, 1832
- Melosira africana Leuduger-Fortmorel, 1898
- Melosira agassizii Ostenfeld, 1909
- Melosira agria Pantocsek, 1905
- Melosira akkavaarensis Tynni, 1982
- Melosira albicans Sheshukova, 1961
- Melosira alphabetica Mann, 1937
- Melosira alternans Pouchet, 1893
- Melosira ambigua (Grunow) O.F. Müller, 1904
- Melosira americana Kützing, 1844
- Melosira anastomosans Grunow, 1882
- Melosira angustissima Neizvestnova-Zhadina, 1941
- Melosira annularis Eichwald, 1847
- Melosira anormal Van Heurck, 1882
- Melosira antarctica Van Heurck, 1909
- Melosira architecturalis Brun, 1892
- Melosira arctica Dickie, 1852
- Melosira arcuata Pantocsek, 1892
- Melosira arenosa Moore ex Hassall, 1852
- Melosira areolata O. Müller, 1904
- Melosira argus Otto Müller, 1904
- Melosira arundinacea F.S. Castracane degli Antelminelli
- Melosira astridae D. Metzeltin & H. Lange-Bertalot, 2007
- Melosira atlymica Rubina, 1962
- Melosira aueri Cleve-Euler, 1948
- Melosira bacillosa Otto Müller, 1903
- Melosira baicalensis (K.I. Meyer) Wislouch
- Melosira baikalensis S. Wislouch, 1924
- Melosira bellicosa Héribaud, 1903
- Melosira biharensis Pantocsek, 1886
- Melosira biseriata (Ehrenberg) Schmidt, 1892
- Melosira bituminosa Pantocsek
- Melosira biwae Mori, 1974
- Melosira bongrainii M. Peragallo, 1921
- Melosira borreri (O.F. Müller) A. Grunow
- Melosira borrerii Greville, 1833
- Melosira bottnica Grunow, 1879
- Melosira boulayana Peragallo, 1902
- Melosira brandinii L.F. Fernandes & R.M. Souza-Mosimann, 2001
- Melosira bruni M. Peragallo & Héribaud-Joseph
- Melosira caliginosa Hanna, 1927
- Melosira campaniensis Moshkovitz, Ehrlich & Soudry, 1983
- Melosira camusi Héribaud-Joseph
- Melosira canadensis Hustedt, 1952
- Melosira canalifera J.-J. Brun & Héribaud-Joseph
- Melosira caputmedusae Pantocsek, 1886
- Melosira carconensis Grunow, 1882
- Melosira caspica Henckel, 1909
- Melosira catenata Brun, 1895
- Melosira charcotii M. Peragallo, 1921
- Melosira cincta Pantocsek, 1886
- Melosira clavigera Grunow, 1882
- Melosira clypeus J. Brun, 1889
- Melosira complexa Lohman, 1948
- Melosira concinna Castracane, 1866
- Melosira constricta Akimova, 1940
- Melosira cornuta Tempére & Brun, 1889
- Melosira coronaria Mann, 1907
- Melosira coronata (Ehrenberg) Kutzing
- Melosira costata Greville, 1866
- Melosira crassa K.E. Lohman, 1957
- Melosira crenulata Cleve & Möller
- Melosira cretacea Jousé, 1951
- Melosira cribrosa Brebisson, 1857
- Melosira cristata Pantocsek, 1889
- Melosira crucicula G.B. De Toni
- Melosira crucipunctata Bachmann, 1936
- Melosira csakyana Pantocsek, 1913
- Melosira cucullata Chen, 1980
- Melosira curvatula Janisch, 1892
- Melosira cycola Ehrenberg
- Melosira dactylus (Ehrenberg) Tempère & Peragallo, 1914
- Melosira davidsonii Schmidt, 1893
- Melosira deblockii H.F. Van Heurck
- Melosira decipiens Grove, 1893
- Melosira decussata (Ehrenberg) Kützing
- Melosira dendrophila (Ehrenberg) R. Ross & P.A. Sims, 1978
- Melosira densserrae Long, Fuge & Smith, 1946
- Melosira dentata H.L. Smith, 1884
- Melosira denticulata K.E. Lohman, 1957
- Melosira dewildemanii Van Heurck, 1909
- Melosira dickiei (Thwaites) Kützing, 1849
- Melosira discigera Agardh, 1824
- Melosira dispersa Carter, 1966
- Melosira dougetii Manguin, 1957
- Melosira dozyana Kützing, 1849
- Melosira dubia Kützing, 1844
- Melosira duplicata Schmidt, 1893
- Melosira dura Mann, 1925
- Melosira echinata E.E. Manguin
- Melosira echinus Frenguelli, 1938
- Melosira elegans Mukhina, 1978
- Melosira elongata Jousé, 1966
- Melosira excentrica Pantocsek, 1892
- Melosira excurrens Nygaard, 1956
- Melosira exspectata Schmidt, 1892
- Melosira fausta A.W.F. Schmidt, 1892
- Melosira fennoscandica Cleve-Euler, 1943
- Melosira ferox Schmidt, 1892
- Melosira forolivensis Forti, 1914
- Melosira fragilis (Roth) Kützing, 1833
- Melosira frigida Jousé, 1959
- Melosira fungiformis Pantocsek, 1892
- Melosira gardneri I. Kaczmarska, 1985
- Melosira garganica Rabenhorst, 1853
- Melosira gelida Cleve, 1883
- Melosira geometrica Hanna, 1932
- Melosira gessneri F. Hustedt, 1965
- Melosira globifera (D. Carmichael) Harvey, 1841
- Melosira glomus F.C. Castracane degli Antelminelli
- Melosira godfroyi M. Peragallo, 1921
- Melosira goetzeana O. Müller
- Melosira goretzkyi Tscheremissinova, 1956
- Melosira gothica Cleve-Euler, 1951
- Melosira gowenii Schmidt, 1892
- Melosira grandis Perty, 1852
- Melosira granulata Otto Müller, 1903
- Melosira granulosa O. Müller
- Melosira grovei Schmidt, 1892
- Melosira guillauminii Manguin ex Kociolek & Reviers, 1996
- Melosira haradaae Pantocsek, 1892
- Melosira helvetica (O.F. Müller) Cleve-Euler, 1911
- Melosira heribaudii Brun, 1893
- Melosira herzogii Lemmermann
- Melosira hetrurica Kützing, 1844
- Melosira heufleri G.G.A. Meneghini
- Melosira hibschii Reichelt, 1897-1900
- Melosira hispanica Hajós, 1982
- Melosira hispida C. Janisch
- Melosira hispida H. Peragallo, 1888
- Melosira hokkaidoana Pantocsek, 1892
- Melosira hormoides Montagne, 1939
- Melosira hummii Hustedt, 1955
- Melosira hunanica Chen & Zhu
- Melosira hungarica Pantocsek, 1892; Schmidt, 1892
- Melosira hustedti Krasske, 1939
- Melosira hyalina Sypniewsky, 1860
- Melosira hyalinula De Toni, 1894
- Melosira hyperborea Grunow, 1882
- Melosira ignota Rubina, 1962
- Melosira imperfecta Héribaud, 1903
- Melosira incertum Leuduger-Fortmorel, 1898
- Melosira incompta Mann, 1925
- Melosira incorrupta Carter, 1966
- Melosira indica Skvortzov
- Melosira inflexa (Roth) Guiry, 2019
- Melosira inordinata Lohman & Andrews, 1968
- Melosira interrupta Lohman & Andrews, 1968
- Melosira irregularis O. Müller
- Melosira irregularis Pantocsek, 1889
- Melosira islandica O.F. Müller, 1906
- Melosira italica (Ehrenberg) Kützing, 1844
- Melosira japonica Pantocsek, 1892
- Melosira jeanbertrandiana Van de Vijver & Crawford, 2019
- Melosira jenyssejana Henckel, 1926
- Melosira jilinensis Huang, 1983
- Melosira johnesii Meyer, 1925
- Melosira juergensis C. Agardh
- Melosira jurgensii Kützing
- Melosira jurlijii Gyarmati & Hajós
- Melosira jutlandica Grunow
- Melosira kamtschatica Grunow ex Cleve & Moller, 1877
- Melosira karelica Mölder, 1951
- Melosira karsteni Mangin, 1915
- Melosira kochii Pantocsek, 1892
- Melosira kondeensis Otto Müller, 1904
- Melosira labuensis Cleve, 1883
- Melosira lacustris Chase, 1886
- Melosira laevis (Ehrenberg) J. Ralfs
- Melosira laevissima Grunow, 1882
- Melosira lauterbornii Pantocsek, 1908
- Melosira lentigera (Carmichael) Harvey
- Melosira lineata (Dillwyn) C. Agardh, 1824
- Melosira lirata (Ehrenberg) Kützing, 1844
- Melosira loczyi Pantocsek, 1889
- Melosira lolia Hanna, 1927
- Melosira lucida Cleve-Euler, 1939
- Melosira lyrata Ehrenberg
- Melosira lyrata Grunow, 1893
- Melosira madagascariensis Schmidt, 1893
- Melosira magnusii Otto Müller, 1904
- Melosira major Grove, 1892
- Melosira mareei Kufferath, 1956
- Melosira margarita K.E. Lohman, 1957
- Melosira marginata Hajós, 1968
- Melosira mauryana Héribaud-Joseph
- Melosira mbasiensis Otto Müller, 1904
- Melosira mediterranea Grunow, 1882
- Melosira medusa Mann, 1907
- Melosira melinitica Pantocsek, 1886
- Melosira mexicana Grunow ex Cleve & Möller, 1878
- Melosira micropunctata K.E. Lohman, 1957
- Melosira mikkelsenii Nygaard, 1956
- Melosira minima Hajós, 1968
- Melosira minuta Héribaud, 1903
- Melosira minutula F.J. Chauvin
- Melosira miocaenica E.A. Cheremisinova
- Melosira mirabilis Brun, 1892
- Melosira moisseevae Lupikina, 1984
- Melosira moniliformis (O.F. Müller) C. Agardh, 1824
- Melosira montagnei (Kützing) N.G.W. Lagerstedt
- Melosira mucosa Manguin, 1915
- Melosira muelleri VanLandingham, 1971
- Melosira muscigena Iwahashi, 1936
- Melosira mutabilis Otto Müller
- Melosira muzzanensis Meister, 1912
- Melosira naegeli Ralfs, 1861
- Melosira natans Hilse, 1863
- Melosira neocaledonica Manguin, 1962
- Melosira neogena Pantocsek, 1913
- Melosira neosphaerica VanLandingham, 1971
- Melosira neostriata VanLandingham, 1971
- Melosira nivalis W. Smith, 1855
- Melosira nobilis Greville, 1865
- Melosira normannii Arnott, 1882
- Melosira nuda K.E. Lohman, 1957
- Melosira nummuloides Greville, 1833
- Melosira nummuloides W. Smith
- Melosira nummulus A.F. Meunier, 1915
- Melosira numulina Agardh
- Melosira nyassensis Otto Müller, 1904
- Melosira nygaardii Camburn, 1986
- Melosira oamaruensis Grove & Sturt, 1887
- Melosira ochracea (A.W. Roth) J. Ralfs, 1843
- Melosira octogona A.W.F. Schmidt, 1893
- Melosira oculus (Ehrenberg) Kützing, 1849
- Melosira oculuschamaeleontis Ehernberg, 1844
- Melosira oestrupi Cleve-Euler, 1910
- Melosira omma Cleve
- Melosira orbifera Brun, 1892
- Melosira ordinata (Kützing)
- Melosira orichalcea (Mertens ex Jürgens) Kützing, 1833
- Melosira ornata Grunow
- Melosira ostrupi A. Cleve
- Melosira ostrupii Héribaud, 1920
- Melosira papilio Mukhina, 1978
- Melosira papillifera Hendey, 1972
- Melosira patera J.A. Long, D.P. Fuge & J. Smith, 1946
- Melosira paucipunctata K.E. Lohman, 1957
- Melosira pella Lohman & Andrews, 1968
- Melosira pensacolae Schmidt, 1893
- Melosira peragalloii Pantocsek, 1892
- Melosira perglabra Østrup, 1910
- Melosira perpusilla Frenguelli, 1923
- Melosira pethoei (Pantocsek)
- Melosira pfaffiana Reinsch, 1867
- Melosira plana (Ehrenberg) Kützing, 1849
- Melosira polaris Grunow, 1884
- Melosira ponderosa K.E. Lohman, 1957
- Melosira pontificalis Brun, 1893
- Melosira prae-angustissima Jousé, 1952
- Melosira praeclara Schmidt, 1892
- Melosira praetermissa V.A. Nikolajev, 1965
- Melosira prichalcea (Mert. Ex Juerg.) Kuetz
- Melosira pseudoamericana Camburn, 1986
- Melosira pseudogranulata Cleve-Euler, 1948
- Melosira pulchella Hustedt, 1952
- Melosira punctata (W. Smith) J. Dannf., 1882
- Melosira puncticulosa Otto Müller, 1903
- Melosira punctissima K.E. Lohman, 1957
- Melosira punctulosa Bethge, 1925
- Melosira pusilla F. Meister, 1913
- Melosira pyxis Otto Müller
- Melosira radiato-sinuata Chen, 1980
- Melosira recedens Schmidt, 1892
- Melosira rieufii Héribaud, 1908
- Melosira robusta Hustedt, 1952
- Melosira roeseana Rabenhorst, 1852
- Melosira roseana Rabenhorst
- Melosira rostratis Zakrzewski, 1934
- Melosira royatensis VanLandingham, 1971
- Melosira salina Kützing, 1844
- Melosira samoensis Schmidt, 1892
- Melosira saratoviana Pantocsek, 1889
- Melosira sarmatica Pantocsek, 1889
- Melosira saturnalis Brun, 1892
- Melosira scabrosa Østrup, 1908
- Melosira scalaris Grunow, 1882
- Melosira schawoi Pantocsek, 1908
- Melosira schroederi J. Woloszynska
- Melosira scopos Mann, 1907
- Melosira selecta Schmidt, 1892
- Melosira semilaevis Grunow, 1882
- Melosira separanda A.W.F. Schmidt
- Melosira setosa J.R. Carter, 1966
- Melosira siberica A.W.F. Schmidt, 1892
- Melosira similis Hustedt, 1942
- Melosira simplex Mann, 1937
- Melosira sinensis Chen, 1980
- Melosira sol Kützing, 1849
- Melosira solitoria Manguin ex Kociolek & Reviers, 1996
- Melosira sparsepunctata Hajós, 1974
- Melosira spec Otto Müller, 1903
- Melosira sphaerica Héribaud, 1903
- Melosira spinifera Hustedt, 1927
- Melosira spinosa Greville
- Melosira spinosa Pantocsek, 1892
- Melosira spinuligera M. Peragallo
- Melosira spinulosa Hustedt, 1952
- Melosira spiralis (Ehrenberg) Kützing
- Melosira steffanssoni Østrup, 1918
- Melosira strangulata Héribaud, 1908
- Melosira striata M. Peragallo & Héribaud, 1893
- Melosira subflexilia Kützing, 1833
- Melosira subflexilis Kützing, 1833
- Melosira subhyalina Van Heurck, 1909
- Melosira subornata Schmidt, 1892
- Melosira subsalsa Cleve-Euler, 1912
- Melosira subsetosa Manguin, 1960
- Melosira subtilis Van Goor, 1924
- Melosira tahitiensis Castracane, 1886
- Melosira tcherniae Manguin, 1960
- Melosira tcherniai Manguin, 1957
- Melosira temperei Pantocsek, 1892
- Melosira tenella Nygaard, 1956
- Melosira tenuis Otto Muller ex Lemmermann, 1903
- Melosira tenuissima Grunow, 1882
- Melosira teres Brun, 1892
- Melosira thermalis Meneghini, 1845
- Melosira thompsonii Harvey, 1841
- Melosira thrypsia Barron, 1975
- Melosira thumii Pantocsek, 1889
- Melosira timensis Oksiyuk, 1960
- Melosira transitus Carter & Denny, 1987
- Melosira transylvanica Pantocsek, 1892
- Melosira triannula K.E. Lohman, 1957
- Melosira tricostata Gleser, 1964
- Melosira trimorpha (Otto Müller)
- Melosira tropica P.L. Crouan & H.M. Crouan
- Melosira truncata E. Grove
- Melosira tuantianensis C. Huang
- Melosira tuberculosa Cleve, 1881
- Melosira tubulata Eichwald, 1860
- Melosira turgida Ehrlich, 1973
- Melosira undulata (Ehrenberg) Kützing, 1844
- Melosira vangeliana Pantocsek & Greguss, 1913
- Melosira vanheurckii M. Peragallo, 1921
- Melosira varennarum M. Peragallo & Héribaud, 1893
- Melosira variabilis McLaughlin, 1986
- Melosira varians C. Agardh, 1827
- Melosira variante Agardh, 1832
- Melosira variata Otto Müller
- Melosira vetustissima Hajós & Stradner, 1974
- Melosira vilida (Grunow) Meister
