= List of reptiles and amphibians of Telangana =

This article lists the species of reptiles and amphibians found in the state of Telangana, India. 85 reptiles and 17 amphibians have been sighted in the state. There have been many studies on the herpetofauna of the state. This list uses British English.

== Amphibians ==
There are seventeen species of amphibians recorded in the state.

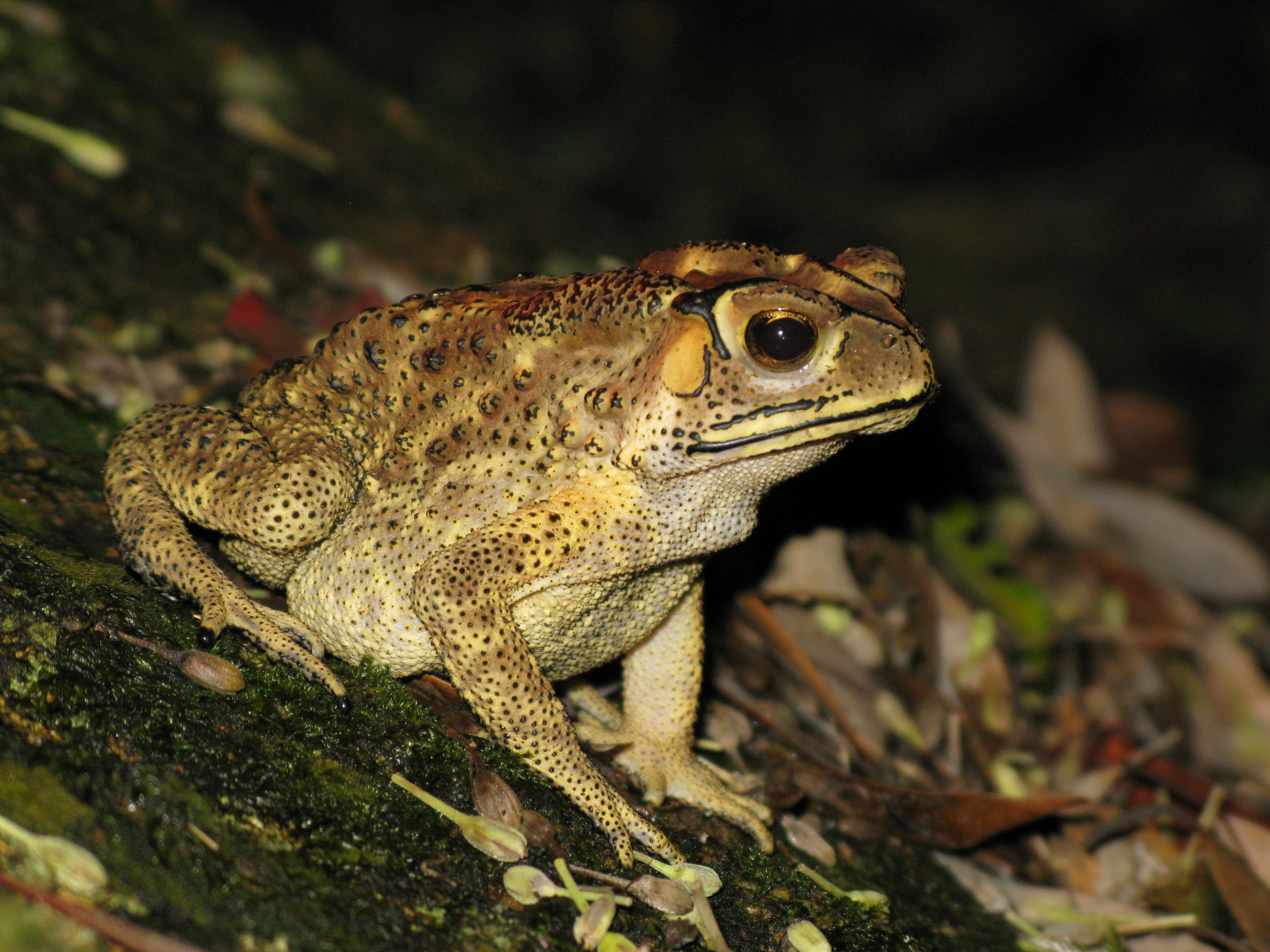
Asian common toad

=== Bufonidae ===
Common name	Binomial name	IUCN status	Vernacular name
Asian common toad	Duttaphrynus melanosticus	LC	సామాన్య కప్ప
Schneider's toad	Duttaphrynus scaber	LC	స్కనైడర్స కప్ప
Deccan toad	Duttaphrynus peninsularis	LC	పాలరాతి కప్ప
Günther's toad	Firouzophrynus hololius	DD	గుంతర్స కప్ప

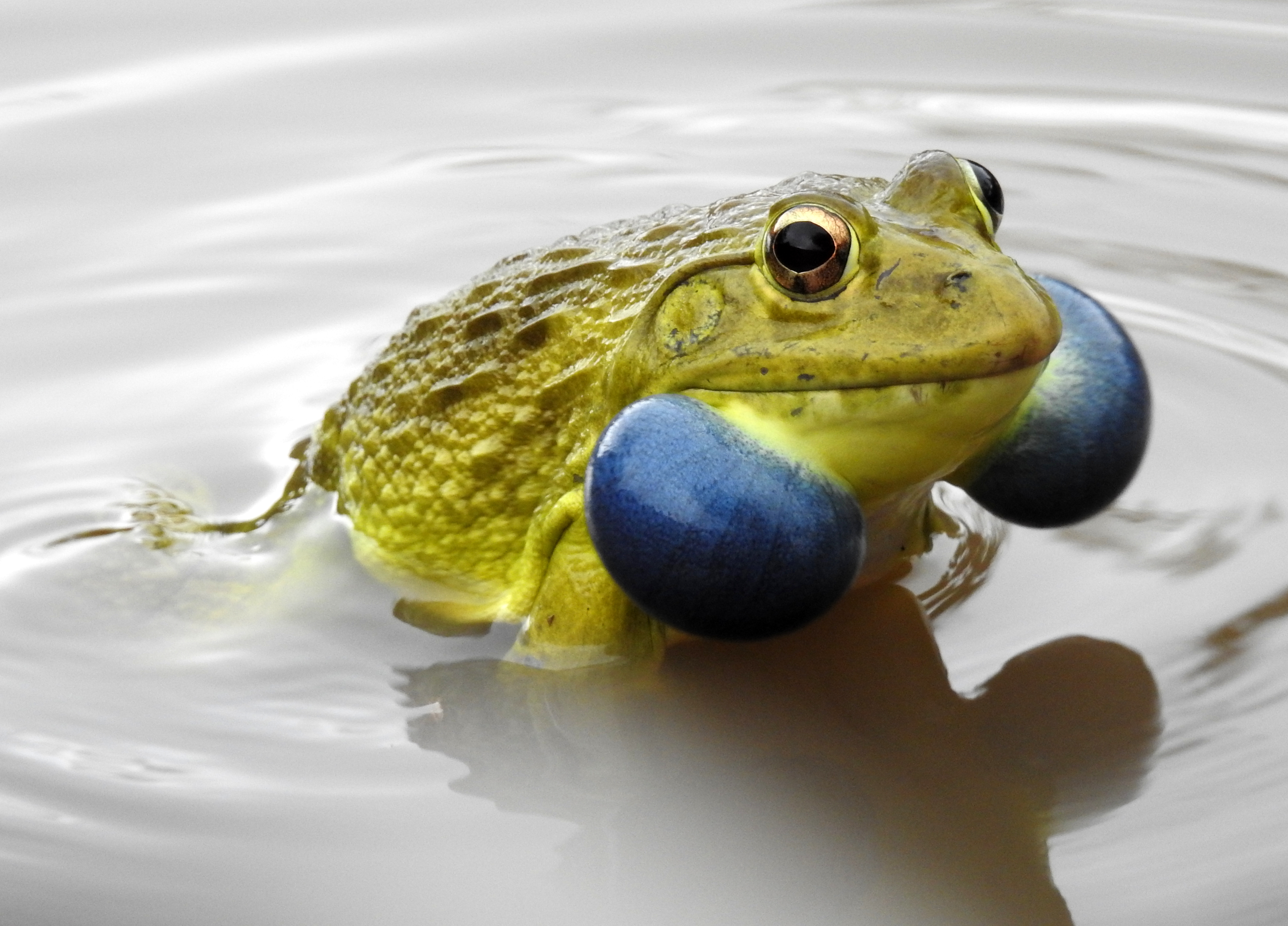
Indus Valley bullfrog

=== Dicroglossidae ===
Common name	Binomial name	IUCN status	Vernacular name
Indian skipper frog	Euphlyctis cyanophlyctis	NE	ఛేరువు కప్ప
Orissa cricket frog	Fejervarya orissaensis	LC	ఓడిషా వరి సేను కప్ప
Common Indian cricket frog	Minervarya agricola	LC	సామాన్య క్రికెట్ కప్ప
Jerdon's bullfrog	Hoplobatrachus crassus	LC	జరడన్స కప్ప
Indus Valley bullfrog	Hoplobatrachus tigerinus	LC	గందరు కప్ప
Indian burrowing frog	Sphaerotheca breviceps	LC	బొరియలు కప్ప

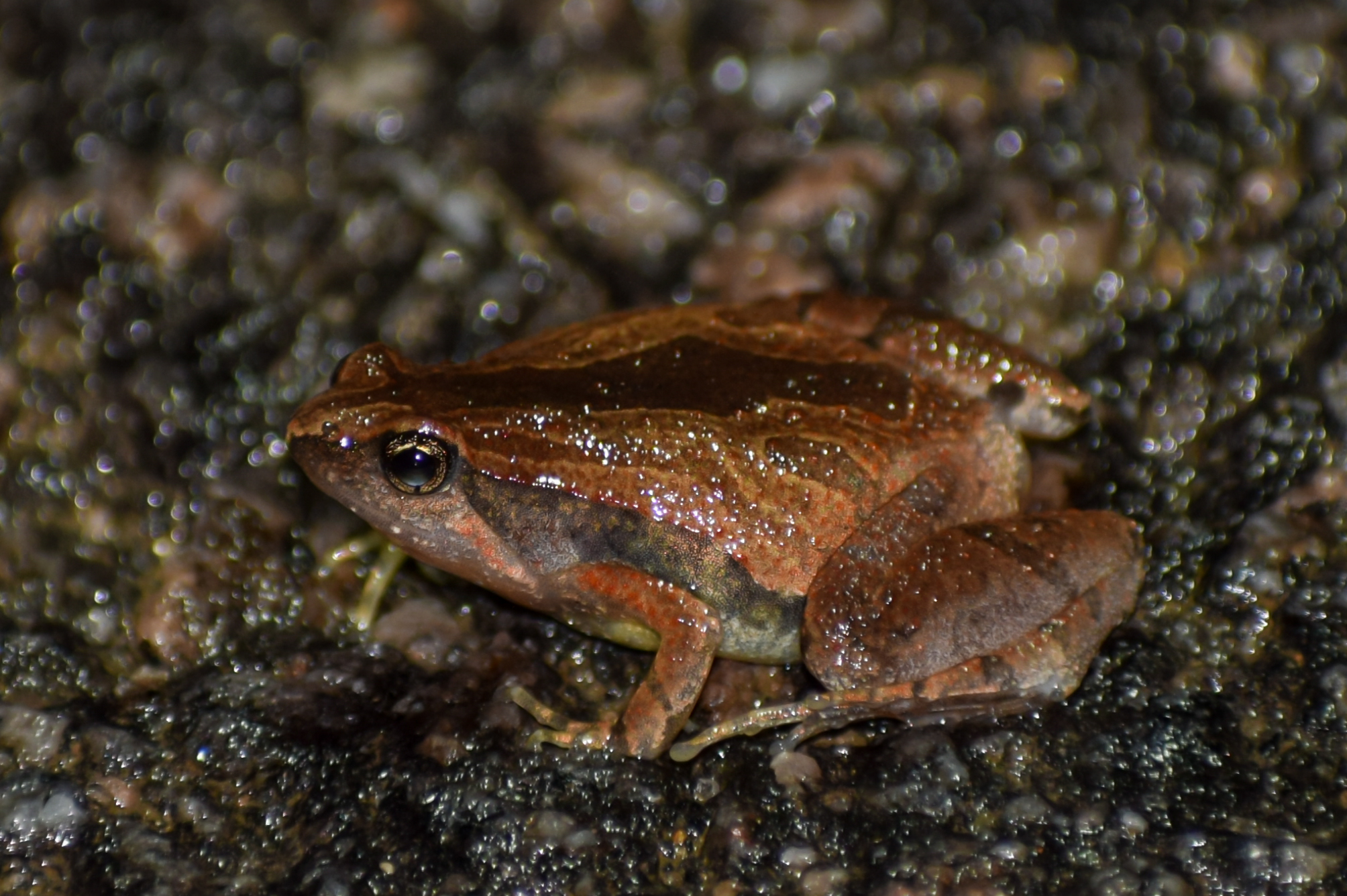
Ornate narrow-mouthed frog

=== Microhylidae ===
Common name	Binomial name	IUCN status	Vernacular name
Ornate narrow-mouthed toad	Microhyla ornata	LC	అలంకృత చిన్న కప్ప
Red narrow-mouthed toad	Microhyla rubra	LC	ఏరుపు ఛిన్న కప్ప
Painted globular frog	Uperodon taprobanicus	LC	చిత్రించిన గలిబుడుగా కప్ప
White-bellied pug snout forg	Uperodon variegatus	LC	రంగురంగుల గలిబుడుగా కప్ప
Indian balloon frog	Uperodon globulosus	LC	సామాన్య గలిబుడుగా కప్ప
Marbled balloon frog	Uperodon systoma	LC	పాలరాతి గలిబుడుగా కప్ప

=== Rhacophoridae ===
Common name	Binomial name	IUCN status	Vernacular name
Chunam tree frog	Polypedates maculatus	LC	సున్నం కప్ప

== Reptiles ==
=== Crocodylia ===
Common name	Binomial name	IUCN status	Vernacular name
Mugger crocodile	Crocodylus palustris	VU	మొసలి

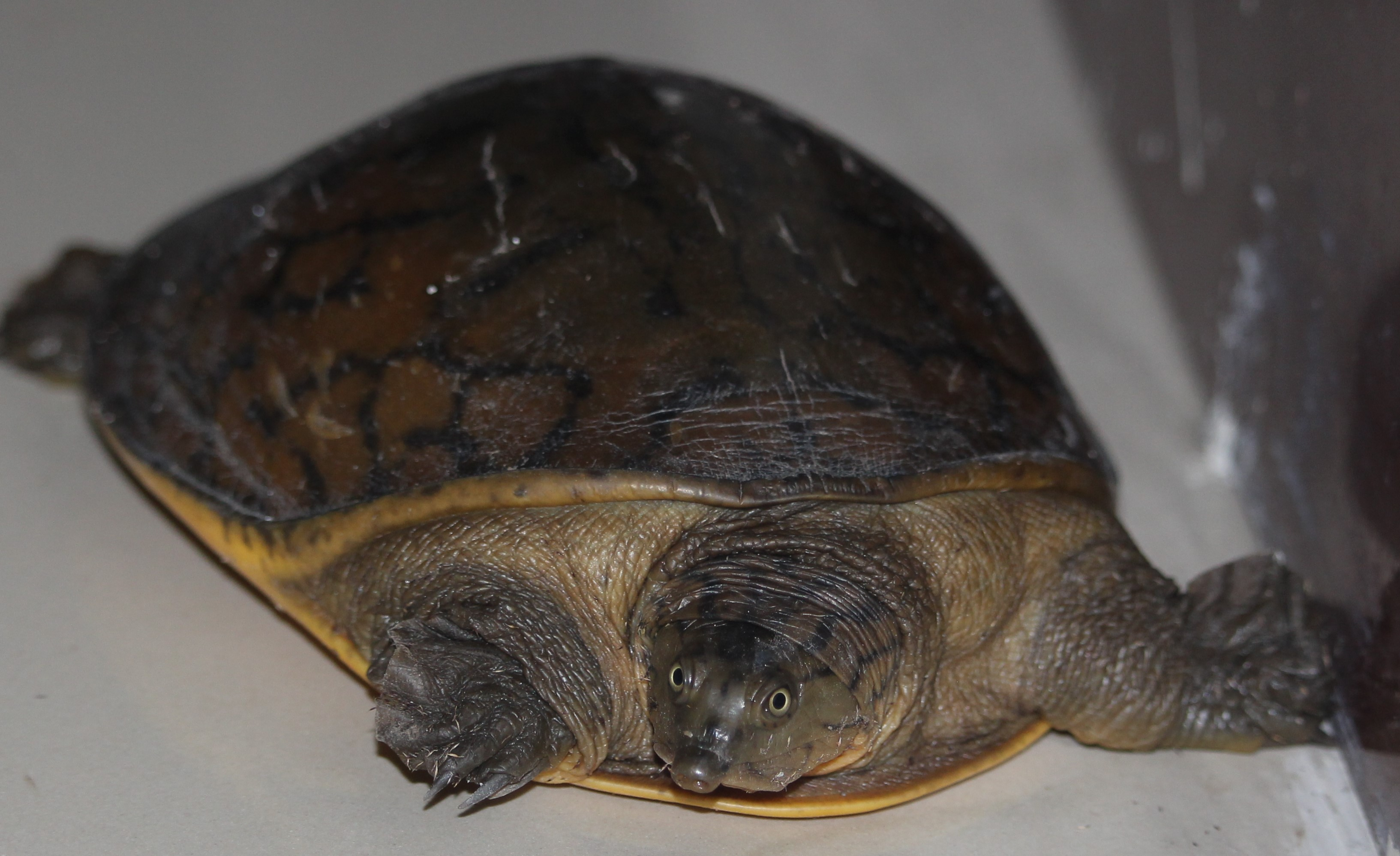
Indian flapshell turtle

=== Testudines ===
Common name	Binomial name	IUCN status	Vernacular name
Indian star tortoise	Geochelone elegans	VU	మొసలి
Indian tent turtle	Pangshura tentoria	LC	సామాన్య డేరా తాబేలు
Indian black turtle	Melanochelys trijuga	NT	నియే తాబేలు
Indian flapshell turtle	Lissemys punctata	LC	రెక్క చిప్ప తాబేలు
Indian softshell turtle	Nilssonia gangetica	VU	గంగమ్మ మతతసి-చిప్ప తాబేలు
Leith's softshell turtle	Nilssonia leithii	VU	లేతన మతతసి-చిప్ప తాబేలు
Pond slider (introduced)	Trachemys scripta	LC	నీటి తాబేలు

=== Sauria ===
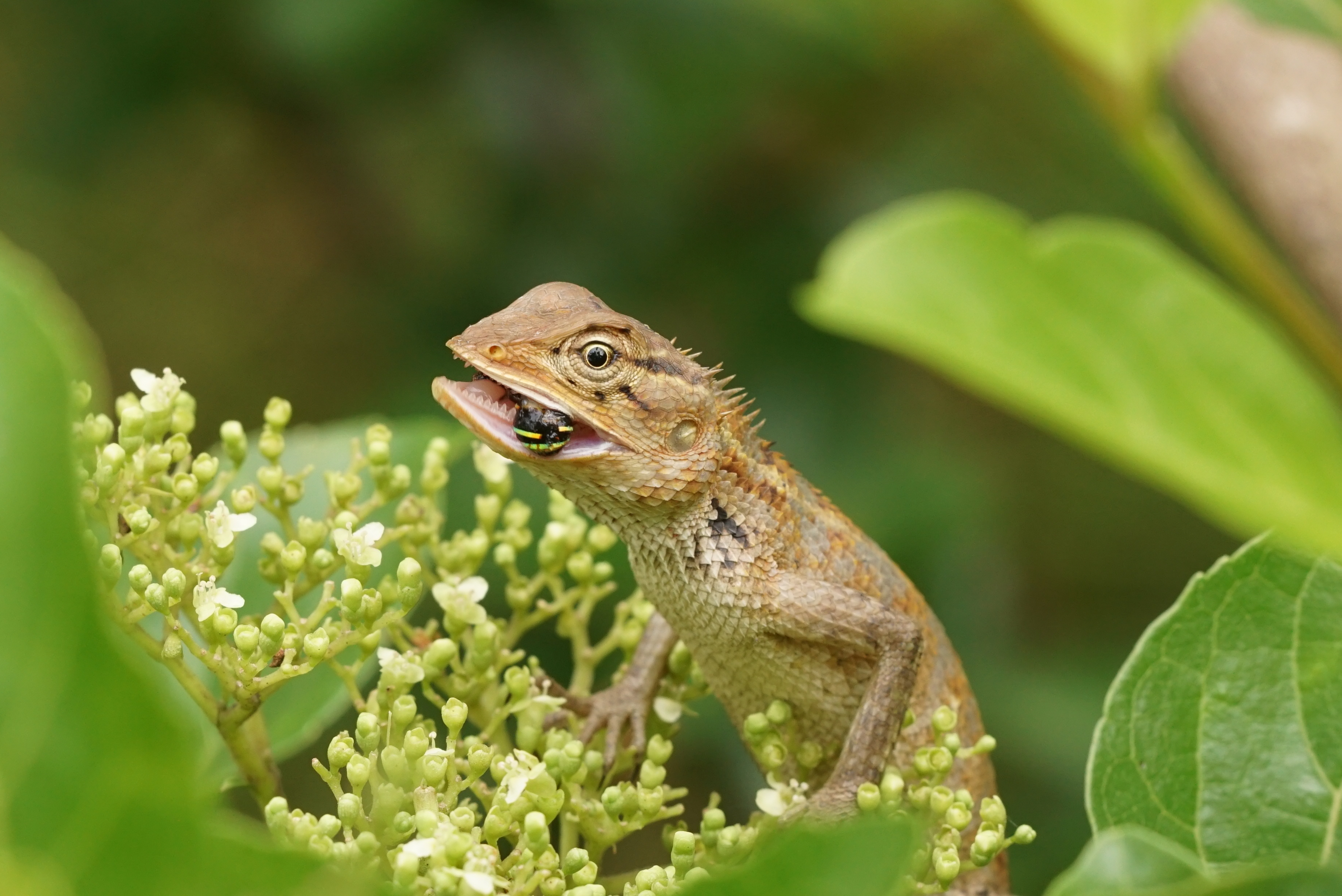
Oriental garden lizard

==== Agamidae ====
Common name	Binomial name	IUCN status	Vernacular name
Roux's forest lizard	Monilesaurus rouxii	LC	అడవి తొండ
Oriental garden lizard	Calotes versicolor	LC	సామాన్య తొండ
Blanford's rock agama	Psammophilus blanfordanus	LC	చిన్న పోలీస్ తొండ
Peninsular rock agama	Psammophilus dorsalis	LC	పోలీస్ తొండ
Spiny-headed fan-throated lizard	Sitana spinaecephalus	NE	సీతమ్మ తొండ
Nagarjuna Sagar fan-throated lizard	Sitana thondalu	NE	నాగార్జునసాగర్ తొండ

==== Chamaeleonide ====
Common name	Binomial name	IUCN status	Vernacular name
Indian chameleon	Chamaeleo zeylanicus	LC	ఊసరవల్లి

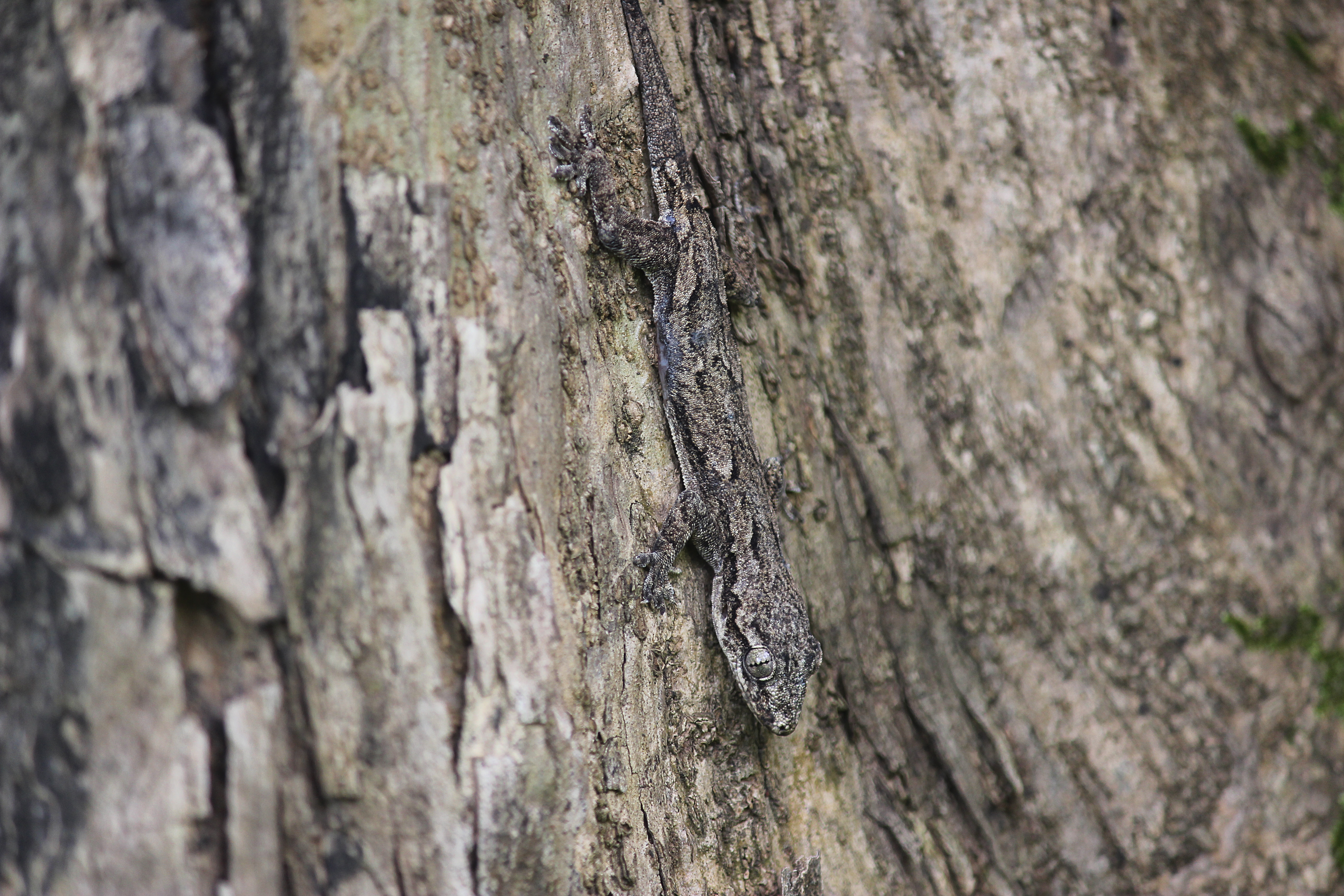
Leschenault's leaf-toed gecko

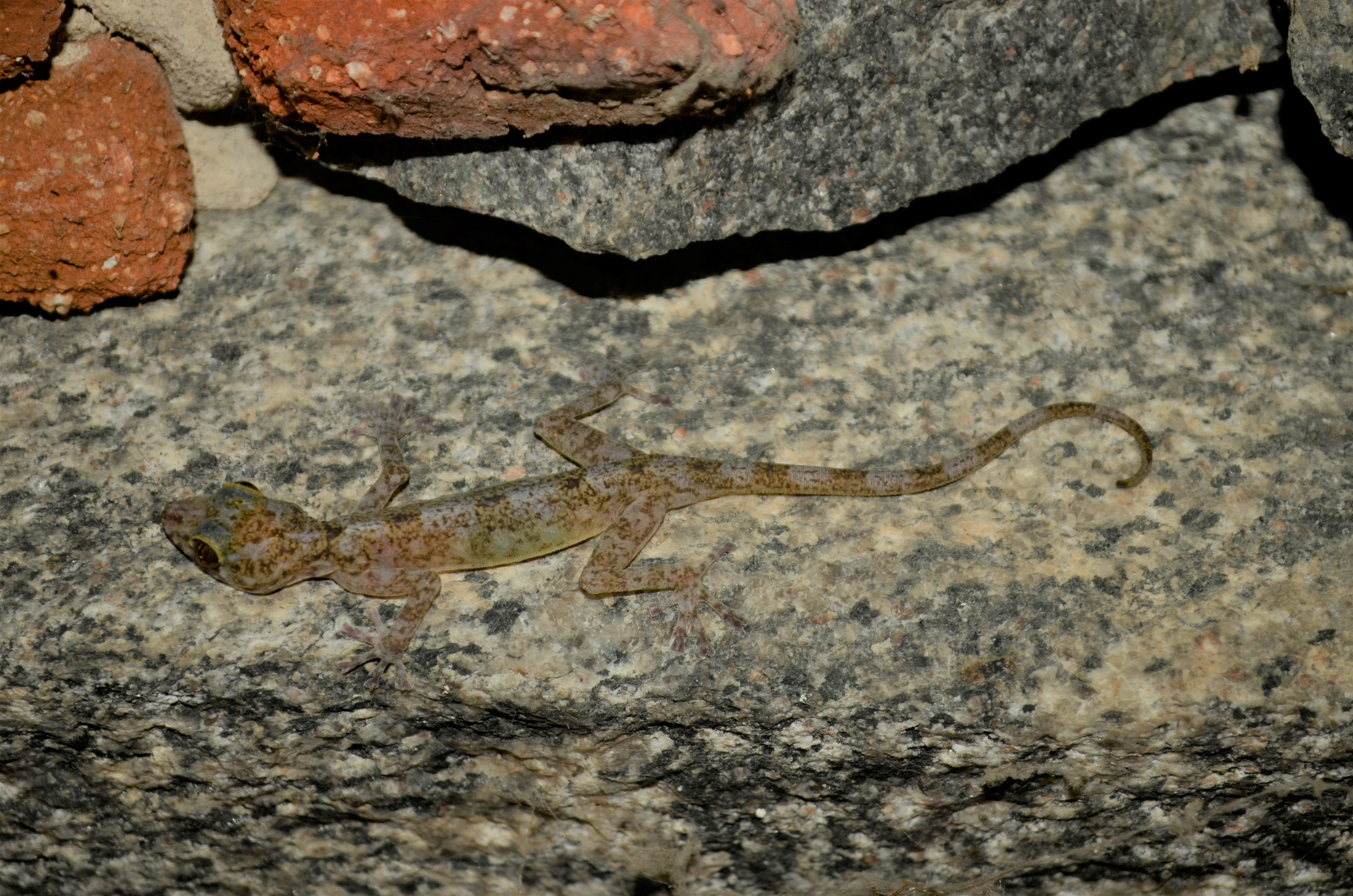
Indian golden gecko

==== Gekkonidae ====
Common name	Binomial name	IUCN status	Vernacular name
Emolous leaf-toed gecko	Hemidactylus aemulus	NE	ఏములుస్ రాతి బల్లి
Mahbubnagar yellow-tailed brookish gecko	Hemidactylus flavicaudus	NE	మహబూబ్నగర్ పశపుతోకగల బల్లి
Northern house gecko	Hemidactylus flaviviridis	NE	పసుపురంగు ఇంటి బల్లి
Asian house gecko	Hemidactylus frenatus	LC	సామాన్య ఇంటి బల్లి
Giant leaft-toed gecko	Hemidactylus giganteus	LC	పేద్ద రాతి బల్లి
Gleadow's house gecko	Hemidactylus gleadowi	NE	గలేడోస్ బల్లి
Graceful leaf-toed gecko	Hemidactylus gracilis	LC	అందమైయాన బల్లి
Kanger Valley rock gecko	Hemidactylus kangerensis	NE	కాంగెర్లోయ బల్లి
Bark gecko	Hemidactylus leschenaultii	NE	లేసేనాలటస్ బల్లి
Murray's house gecko	Hemidactylus murrayi	NE	ముర్రేస్ బల్లి
Spotted house gecko	Hemidactylus parvimaculatus	NE	చుక్కల బల్లి
Reticulate leaf-toed gecko	Hemidactylus reticulatus	LC	సన్న-చారల బల్లి
Sahgal's termite-hill gecko	Hemidactylus sahgali	NE	సెహెగల్స్ చెడ్డలపుట్ట బల్లి
Saxatile leaf-toed gecko	Hemidactylus saxicolus	NE	సాక్షాటయిలే రాతి బల్లి
Treutler's gecko	Hemidactylus treutleri	LC	త్రుతలర్స బల్లి
Blotched house gecko	Hemidactylus triedrus	NE	చెడ్డలపుట్ట బల్లి
Whittaker's termite-hill gecko	Hemidactylus whitakeri	LC	విత్తకేర్స్ చెడ్డలపుట్ట బల్లి
Nalgonda yellow-tailed brookish gecko	Hemidactylus xericolus	NE	నాలగొండ పశపుతోకగల బల్లి
Indian golden gecko	Calodactylodes aureus	LC	బంగారు బల్లి

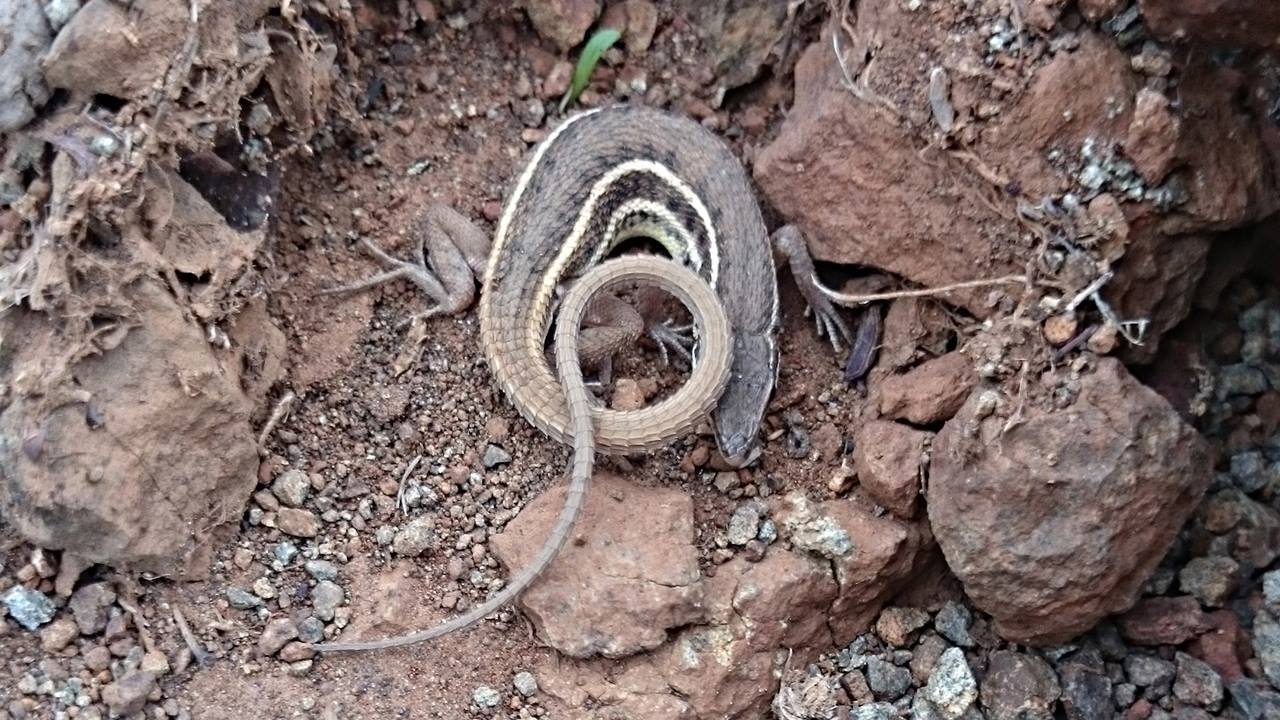
Jerdon's snake-eye

==== Lacertidae ====
Common name	Binomial name	IUCN status	Vernacular name
Leschenault's snake-eye	Ophisops leschenaultii	LC	లేసేనాలటస్ పాము-కనులా బల్లి
Jerdon's snake-eye	Ophisops jerdonii	LC	జరడన్స పాము-కనులా బల్లి
Lesser snake-eye	Ophisops nictans	NE	చిన్న పాము-కనులా బల్లి

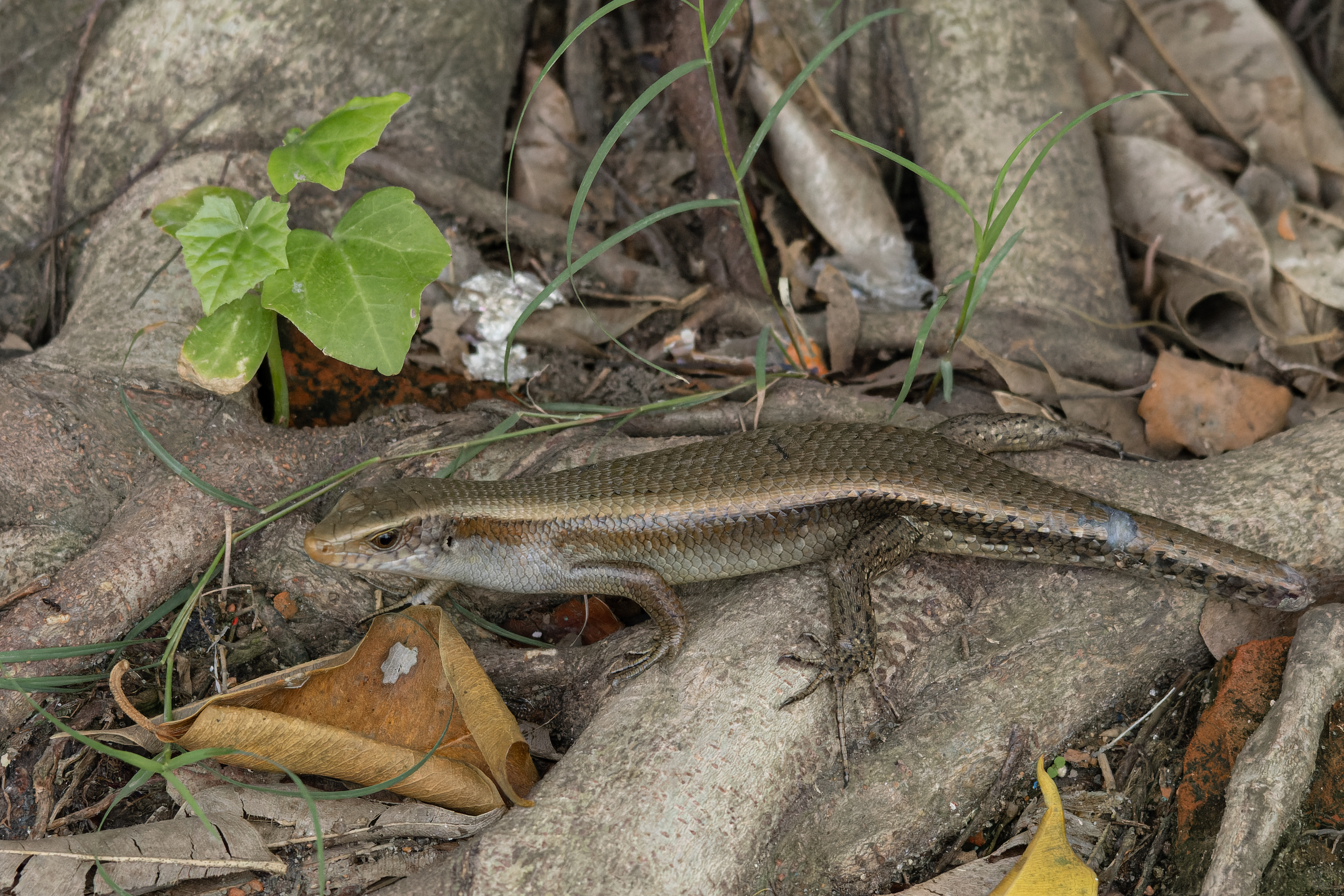
Keeled Indian mabuya

==== Scincidae ====
Common name	Binomial name	IUCN status	Vernacular name
White-spotted supple skink	Hemidactylus aemulus	NE	తెళ-మచ్చలా నలికిరీ
Günther's writhing skink	Riopa guentheri	LC	గుంతర్స నలికిరీ
Common dotted garden skink	Riopa punctata	NE	నలికిరీ
Allapalli grass skink	Eutropis allapallensis	LC	ఆళ్లపల్లి పాలపిందె
Ashwamedha supple skink	Eutropis ashwamedhi	VU	ఆశ్వమేధుని పాలపిందె
Keeled Indian mabuya	Eutropis carinata	LC	పాలపిందె
Bronze mabuya	Eutropis macularia	NE	మచ్చమచ్చల పాలపిందె
Sharma's mabuya	Eutropis nagarjuni	NT	నాగార్జునసాగర్ పాలపిందె

==== Varanidae ====
Common name	Binomial name	IUCN status	Vernacular name
Bengal monitor	Varanus bengalensis	LC	వుదుము

=== Ophidia ===
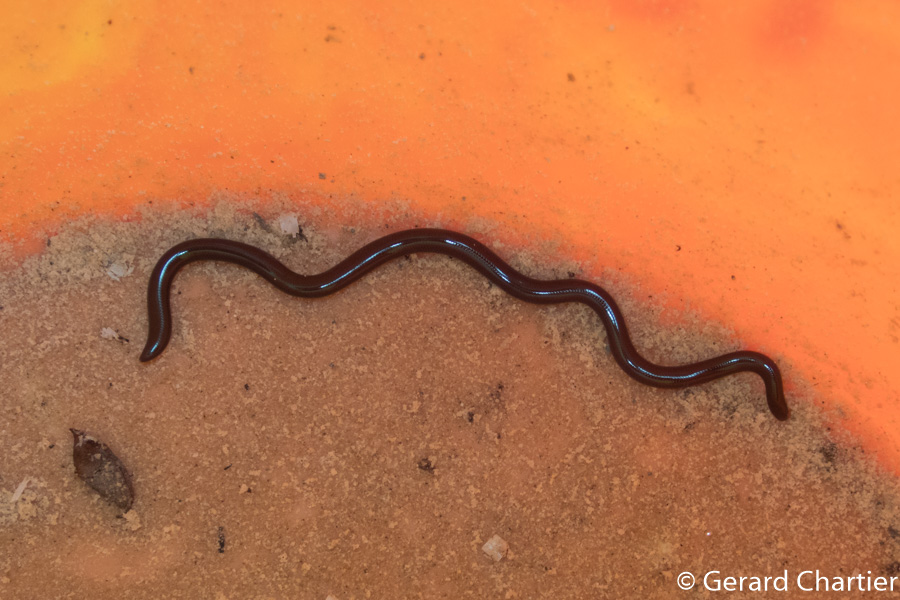
Brahminy blind snake

==== Typhlophidae ====
Common name	Binomial name	IUCN status	Vernacular name
Beaked worm snake	Grypotyphlops acutus	LC	ఎద్దూ ముక్కూ పాము
Brahminy blind snake	Indotyphlops braminus	NE	గుడ్డి పాము

==== Pythonidae ====
Common name	Binomial name	IUCN status	Vernacular name
Indian python	Python molurus	NE	కొండచలువ

==== Boidae ====
Common name	Binomial name	IUCN status	Vernacular name
Rough-scaled sand boa	Eryx conicus	NE	మట్టి పాము
Red sand boa	Eryx johnii	NE	రెండుముతుల పాము

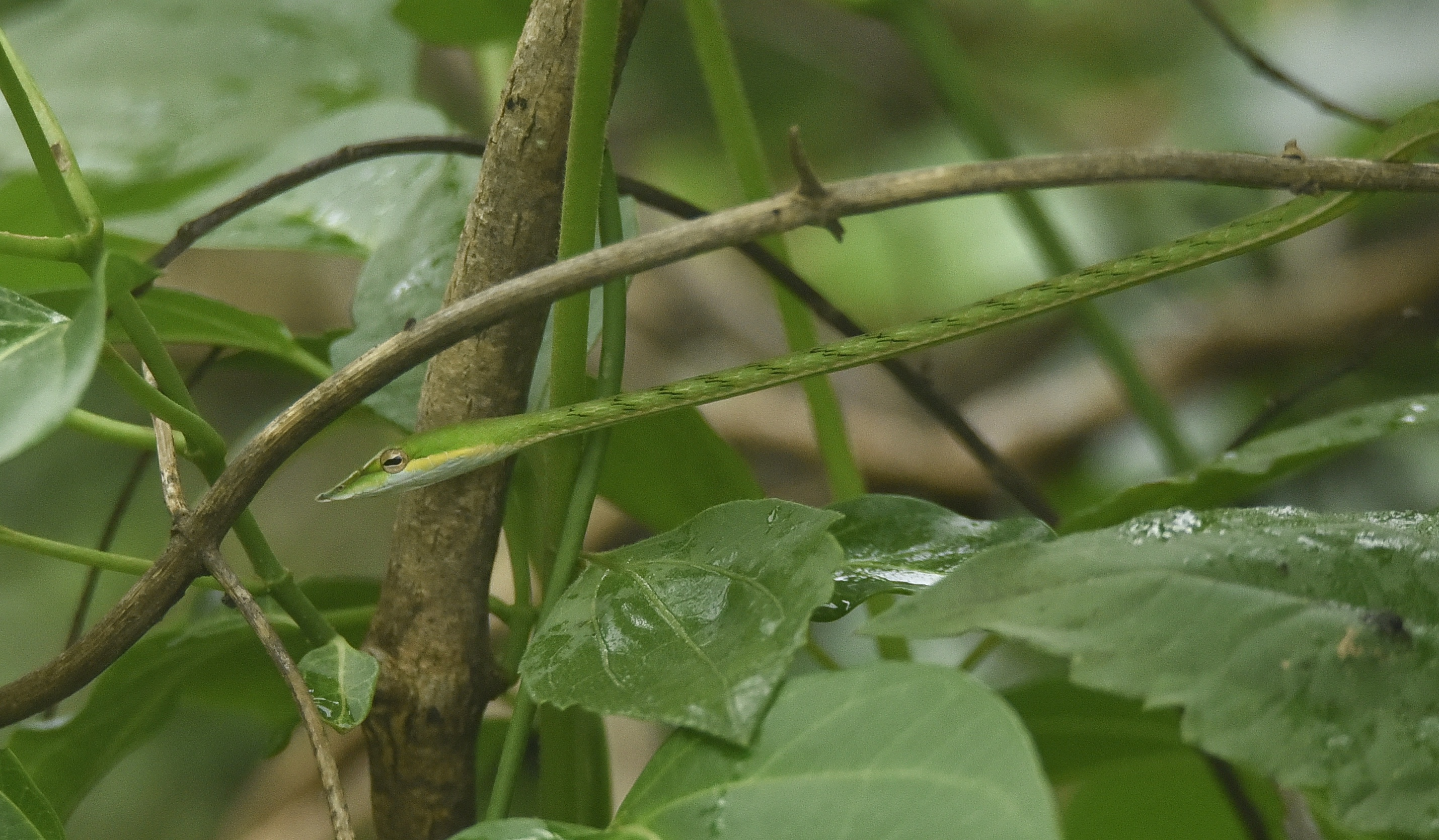
Indian vine snake

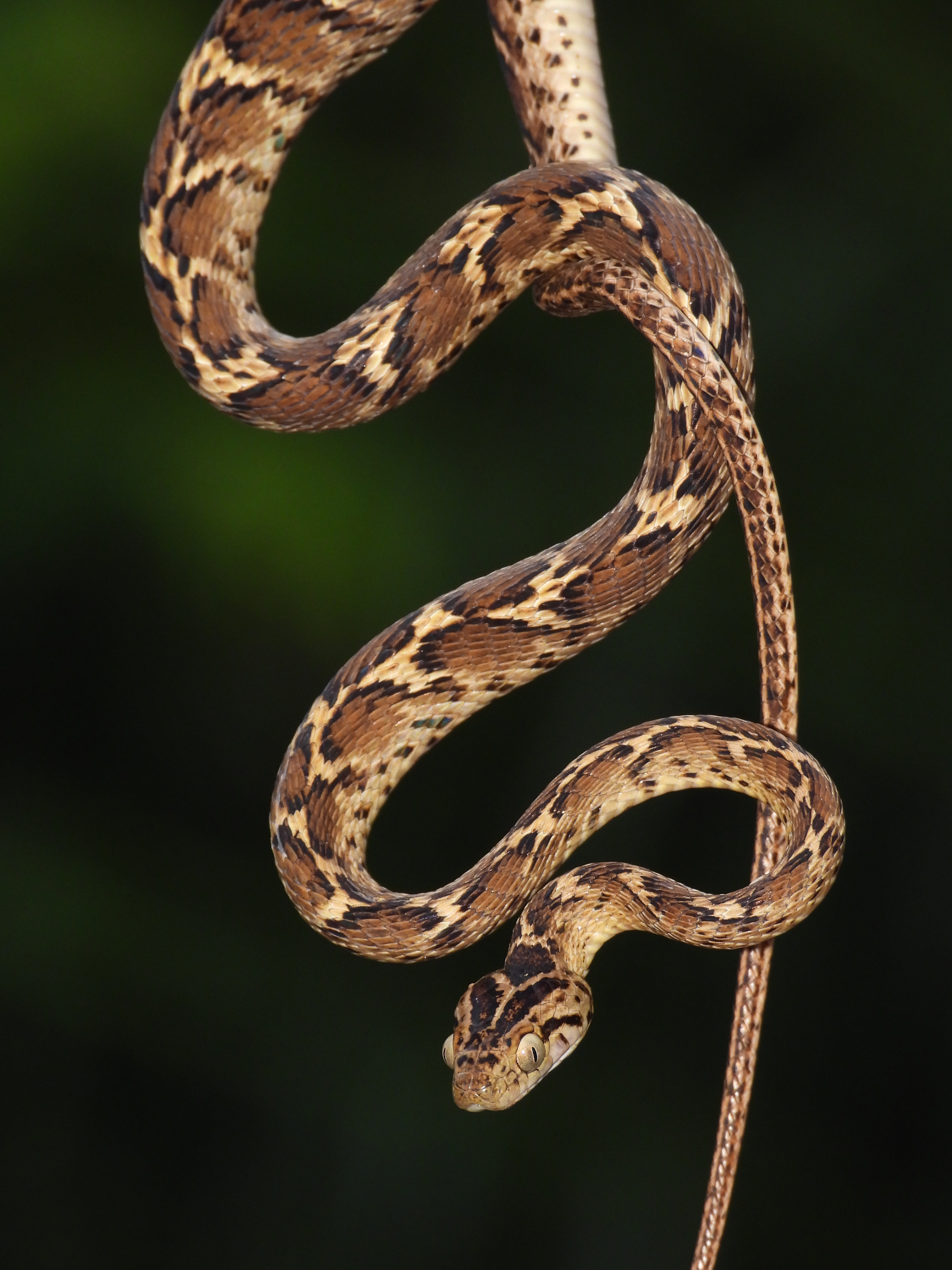
Common cat snake

==== Colubridae ====
Common name	Binomial name	IUCN status	Vernacular name
Indian vine snake	Ahaetulla oxyrhynca	NE	పసరిక
Yellow-green cat snake	Boiga flaviviridis	NE	పసుపుపచ్చ పిల్లి-కన్ను పాము
Forsten's cat snake	Boiga forsteni	LC	ఫోరసటెన్ పిల్లి-కన్ను పాము
Common cat snake	Boiga trigonata	LC	సామాన్య పిల్లి-కన్ను పాము
Indian egg-eating snake	Boiga westermanni	NE	గుడ్డు-తినె పాము
Trinket snake	Coelognathus helena	NE	మెగారేకుల పొద
Indian smooth snake	Wallophis brachyura	NE	మెత్తని పాము
Common bronzeback tree snake	Dendrelaphis tristis	NE	చెత్తరీక
Banded wolf snake	Lycodon fasciolatus	NE	సన్న కట్ల పాము
Indian wolf snake	Lycodon aulicus	NE	చిన్న కట్ల పాము
Yellow-collared wolf snake	Lycodon flavicollis	NE	పసుపు మేడ చిన్న కట్ల పాము
Yellow-spotted wolf snake	Lycodon flavomaculatus	LC	పసుపు మచ్చల చిన్న కట్ల పాము
Vellore bridal snake	Lycodon nympha	NE	వనదేవత పాము
Barred wolf snake	Lycodon striatus	NE	చారల కట్ల పాము
Streaked kukri snake	Oligodon taeniolatus	NE	సామాన్య కుకరీ పాము
Russell's kukri snake	Oligodon russelius	LC	రసెల్స కుకరీ పాము
Sharma's racer	Platyceps bholanathi	DD	నాగార్జునసాగర్ పాము
Banded racer	Platyceps plinii	NE	శ్వేత నాగు
Oriental rat snake	Pytas mucosa	NE	జెర్రిగొద్దు
Duméril's black-headed snake	Sibynophis subpunctatus	NE	చిన్న నలాతల పాము

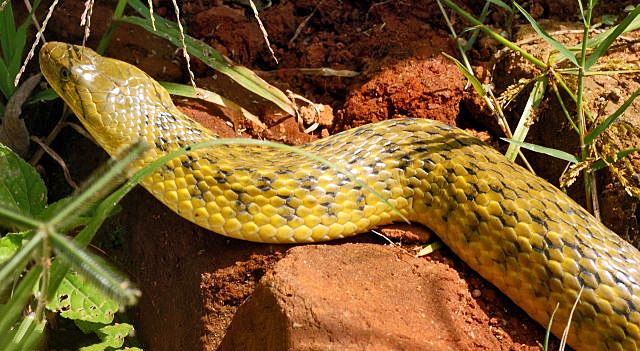
Checkered keelback

==== Natricidae ====
Common name	Binomial name	IUCN status	Vernacular name
Buff striped keelback	Amphiesma stolatum	NE	వాన కోయిలా
Split keelback	Atretium schistosum	LC	వాన పాము
Checkered keelback	Fowlea piscator	NE	నీరుకట్టే పాము
Green keelback	Rhabdophis plumbicolor	NE	వనప పాము

==== Psammophidae ====
Common name	Binomial name	IUCN status	Vernacular name
Stout sand snake	Psammophis longifrons	LC	ఇసుక పాము
Indian sand snake	Psammophis condanarus	LC	బొడ్డు ఇసుక పాము

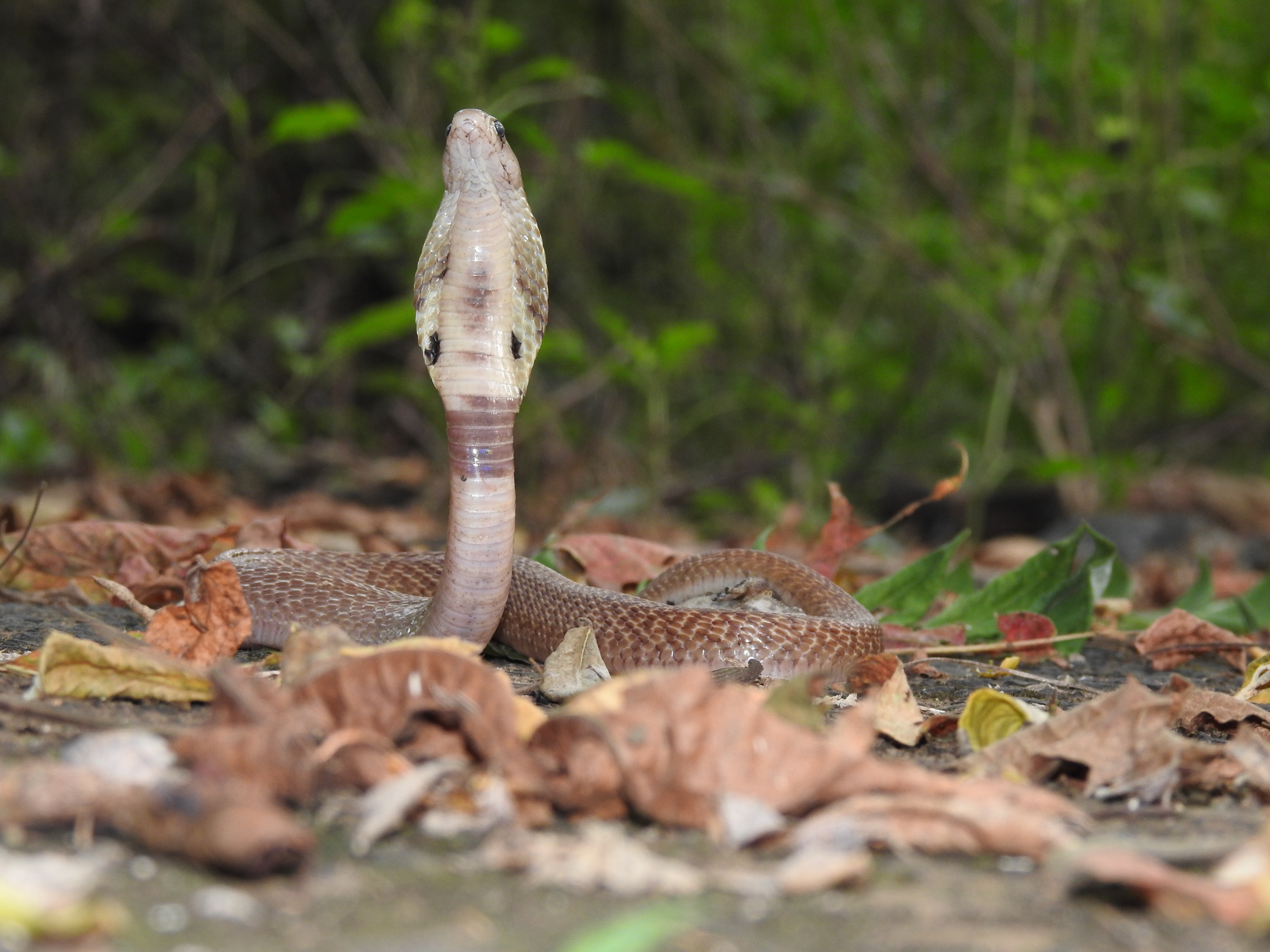
Indian cobra

==== Elapidae ====
Common name	Binomial name	IUCN status	Vernacular name
Common krait	Amphiesma stolatum	NE	కట్ల పాము
Banded krait	Atretium schistosum	LC	బంగారు కట్ల పాము
Slender coralsnake	Calliophis melanurus	NE	సనని పగడపు పాము
Indian cobra	Naja naja	NE	నాగు పాము

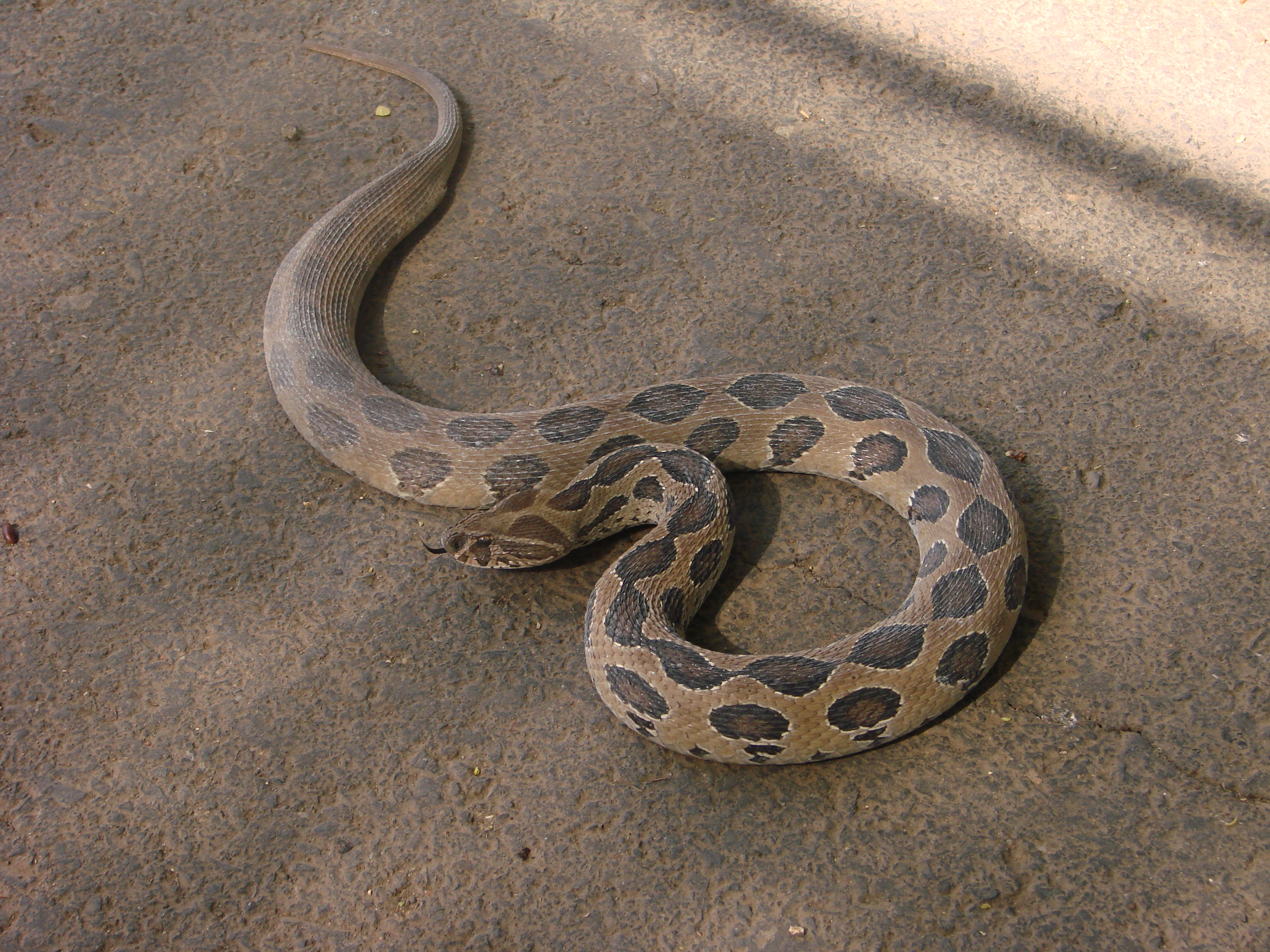
Russell's viper

==== Viperidae ====
Common name	Binomial name	IUCN status	Vernacular name
Russell's viper	Daboia russelli	NE	రక్త పింజర
Saw-scaled viper	Echis carinatus	NE	చిన్న పింజర
Bamboo pit viper	Craspedocephalus gramineus	LC	వెదురు పాము

==== Uropeltidae ====
Common name	Binomial name	IUCN status	Vernacular name
Elliot's earth snake	Uropeltis ellioti	LC	ఎలియట్స్ మన్ను పాము
