= Riopa vosmaerii =

Conservation status
- Data Deficient (IUCN 3.1)

Scientific classification
- Kingdom: Animalia
- Phylum: Chordata
- Class: Reptilia
- Order: Squamata
- Family: Scincidae
- Genus: Riopa
- Species: R. vosmaeri

Binomial name
- Riopa vosmaeri (Gray, 1839)

Synonyms
- Hagria vosmaerii Gray, 1839; Campsodactylus lamarrei A.M.C. Duméril & Bibron, 1839; Lygosoma vosmaeri — Boulenger, 1887; Riopa vosmaeri — M.A. Smith, 1935; Lygosoma vosmaeri — Brygoo, 1985

Species of lizard

Vosmer's writhing skink (Riopa vosmaeri) is a species of skink, a lizard in the family Scincidae. The species is endemic to India.

== Etymology ==
The specific name, vosmaeri, is in honor of Dutch naturalist Arnout Vosmaer (1720–1799).

== Geographic range and habitat ==
R. vosmaerii is found in India. Originally it was known only from the holotype. A second specimen was discovered in 2009 in an open scrub jungle in rocky habitat near Jaggayapet, Andhra Pradesh, some 170 years after the collection of the holotype.

== Description ==
R. vosmaerii resembles L. lineata. However, L. vosmaerii has five digits on each front foot, where R. lineata has only four.
