= Riopa anguina =

Conservation status
- Least Concern (IUCN 3.1)

Scientific classification
- Kingdom: Animalia
- Phylum: Chordata
- Class: Reptilia
- Order: Squamata
- Suborder: Scinciformata
- Infraorder: Scincomorpha
- Family: Scincidae
- Genus: Riopa
- Species: R. anguina

Binomial name
- Riopa anguina (Theobald, 1868)
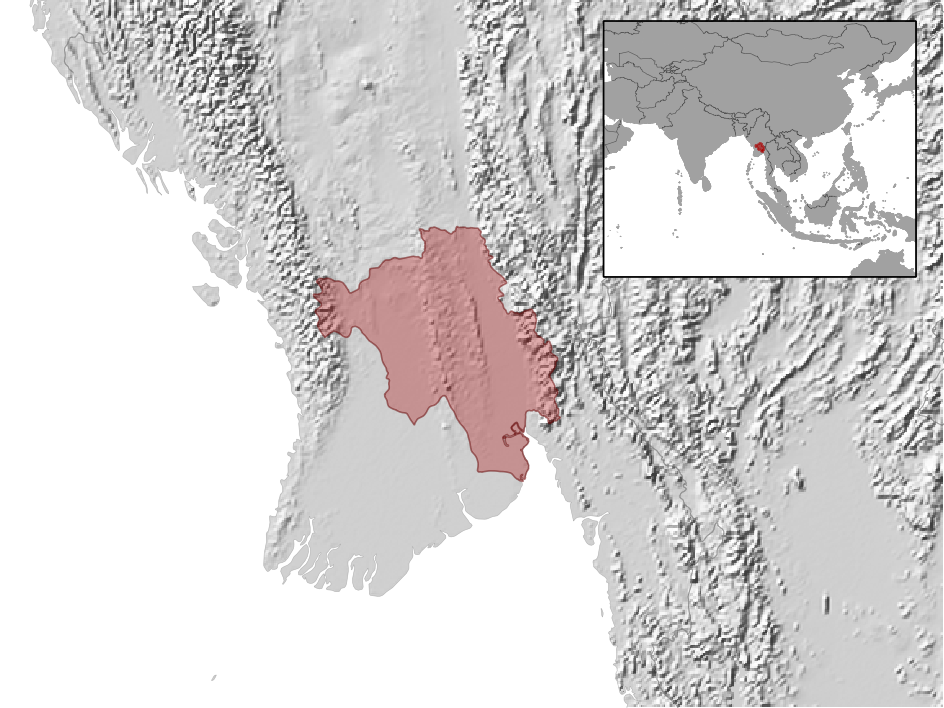

Species of lizard

Riopa anguina is a species of skink found in Myanmar and Thailand.
