= Riopa lineolata =

Conservation status
- Least Concern (IUCN 3.1)

Scientific classification
- Kingdom: Animalia
- Phylum: Chordata
- Class: Reptilia
- Order: Squamata
- Suborder: Scinciformata
- Infraorder: Scincomorpha
- Family: Scincidae
- Genus: Riopa
- Species: R. lineolata

Binomial name
- Riopa lineolata (Stoliczka, 1870)

Species of skink found in Myanmar and Bangladesh

The striped writhing skink (Riopa lineolata) is a species of skink found in Myanmar and Bangladesh.
