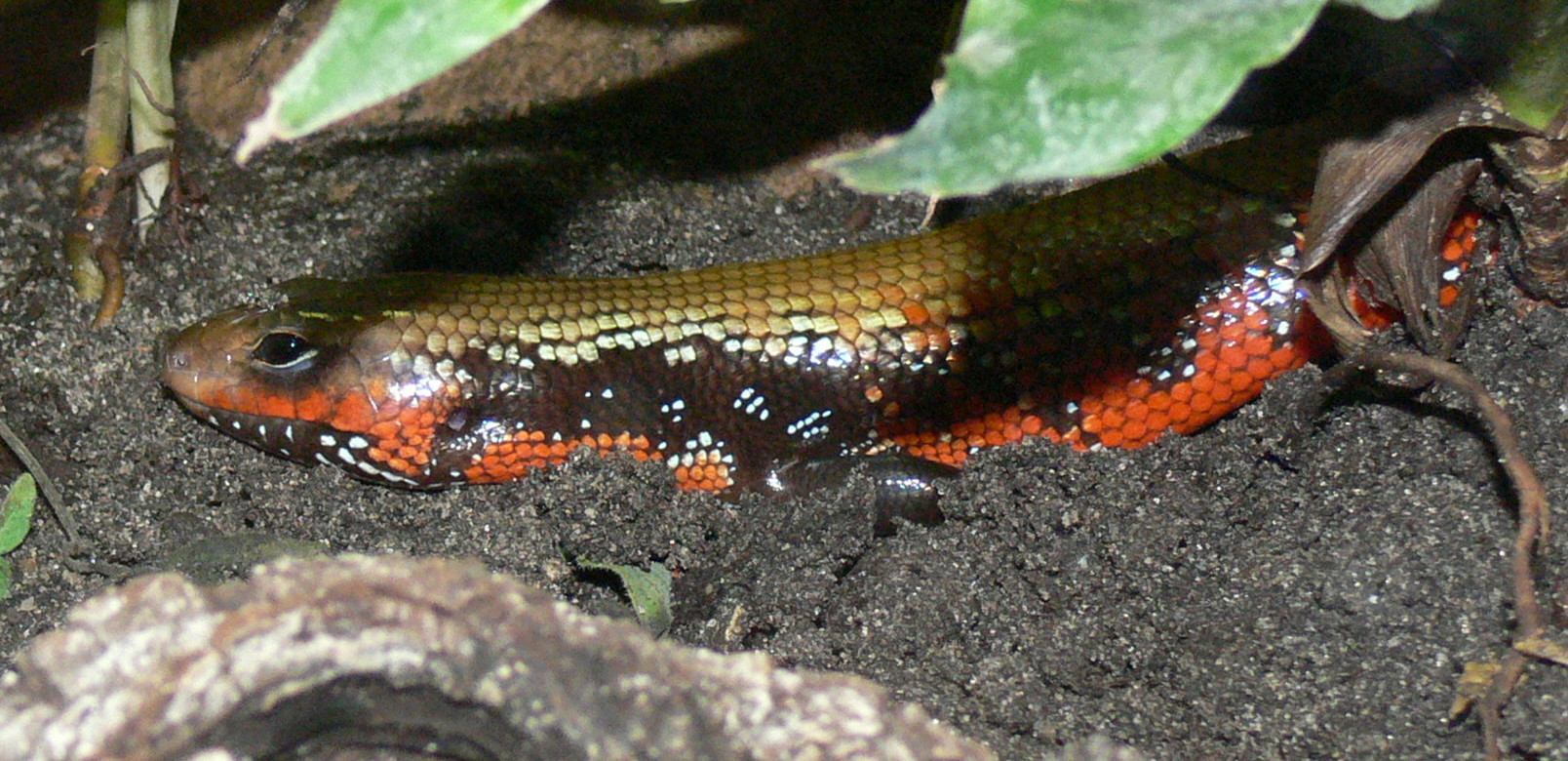

Scientific classification
- Domain: Eukaryota
- Kingdom: Animalia
- Phylum: Chordata
- Class: Reptilia
- Order: Squamata
- Family: Scincidae
- Subfamily: Lygosominae
- Genus: Riopa (Gray, 1839)

= Riopa =

Genus of lizards

Riopa is a genus of skinks. It is easy to tell the species apart from most other skinks by bright red coloring on their sides from which they get their name. They also have a bule that runs down the side of their tail.

== Diet ==
Riopas are omnivorous reptiles. They usually eat insects like crickets or worms, but sometimes they can also eat small pieces of meat, usually little mice.

== Species ==
The following species are recognized.

- Riopa albopunctata (Gray, 1846) – white-spotted supple skink
- Riopa anguina (Theobald, 1868)
- Riopa deccanensis Bhupathi, Ray, Karuthapandi, Jaiswal, Deepak & Mohapatra, 2025 – Deccan Gracile Skink
- Riopa goaensis (Sharma, 1976) – Goan supple skink
- Riopa guentheri (W. Peters, 1879) – Günther's supple skink, Günther's writhing skink
- Riopa lineata Gray, 1839 – lined supple skink
- Riopa lineolata (Stoliczka, 1870) – striped writhing skink
- Riopa popae (Shreve, 1940) – Pope's writhing skink
- Riopa punctata (Gmelin, 1799) – common dotted garden skink, common snake skink, punctate supple skink
- Riopa vosmaerii (Gray, 1839) – Vosmer's writhing skink
