= Riopa deccanensis =

Scientific classification
- Kingdom: Animalia
- Phylum: Chordata
- Order: Squamata
- Family: Scincidae
- Genus: Riopa
- Species: R. deccanensis

Binomial name
- Riopa deccanensis Bhupathi, Ray, Karuthapandi, Jaiswal, Deepak & Mohapatra, 2025

Species of skink

Riopa deccanensis is a species of skink found in India. It was discovered from the forest of Eastern Ghats of Andhra Pradesh.

== Etymology ==
This species is named after the Deccan Plateau where the 2 sites from which it was discovered lies.

== Distribution ==
At the time of describing this species in 2025, this skink has been recorded from the Amrababad Tiger Reserve in Telangana and Seshachalam Biosphere in Andhra Pradesh.

== Description ==
It has16 longitudinal stripes running down the back. Its lower eyelid has a semitransparent disk. The feet has five toes and five fingers and scales covering its ear opening.
