= Riopa popae =

Conservation status
- Least Concern (IUCN 3.1)

Scientific classification
- Kingdom: Animalia
- Phylum: Chordata
- Class: Reptilia
- Order: Squamata
- Suborder: Scinciformata
- Infraorder: Scincomorpha
- Family: Scincidae
- Genus: Riopa
- Species: R. popae

Binomial name
- Riopa popae (Shreve, 1940)

Species of lizard

Pope's writhing skink (Riopa popae) is a species of skink found in Myanmar.
