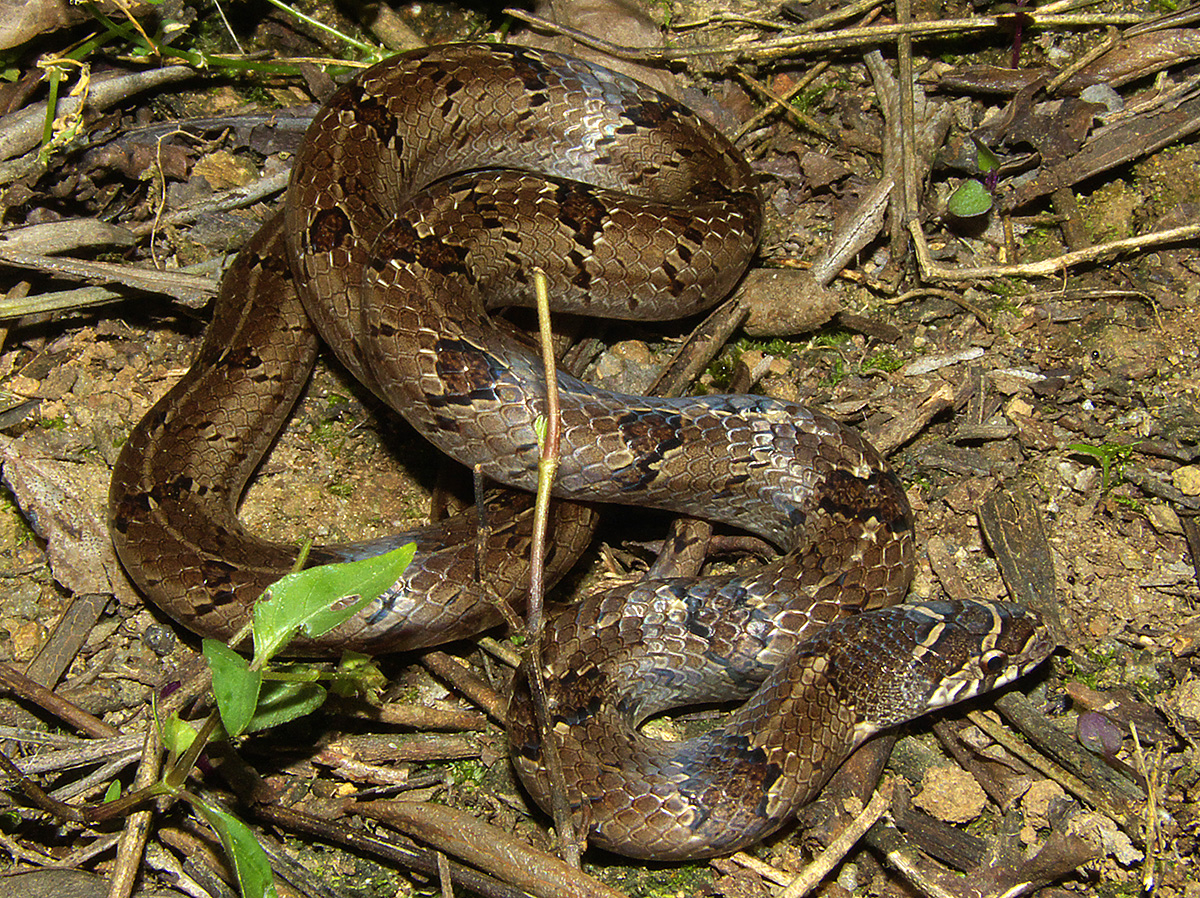
- Oligodon taeniolatus

Conservation status
- Least Concern (IUCN 3.1)

Scientific classification
- Kingdom: Animalia
- Phylum: Chordata
- Class: Reptilia
- Order: Squamata
- Suborder: Serpentes
- Family: Colubridae
- Genus: Oligodon
- Species: O. taeniolatus

Binomial name
- Oligodon taeniolatus (Jerdon, 1853)
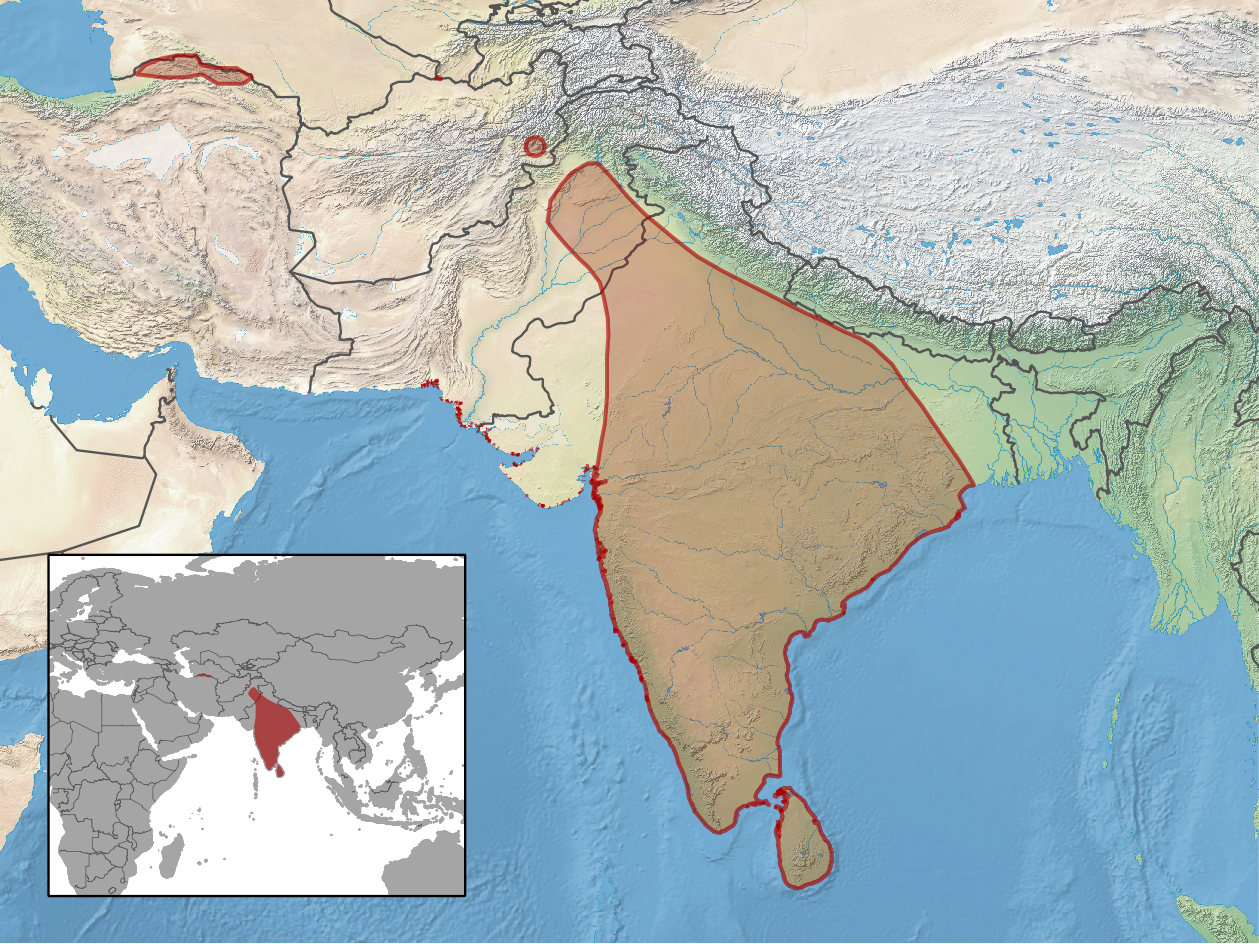

= Oligodon taeniolatus =

Streaked kukri snake

Species of snake

The streaked kukri snake (Oligodon taeniolatus) is a species of nonvenomous snake found in Asia. It is also known as the variegated kukri. The IUCN lists the species as least concern.

== Taxonomy ==
The species was first described by the British physician and zoologist Thomas C. Jerdon in 1853 as Coronella taeniolata.

There are two subspecies:

- Oligodon taeniolatus taeniolatus (Jerdon 1853)
- Oligodon taeniolatus fasciatus (Günther 1864)

== Distribution ==
India, Pakistan, Sri Lanka, S. Turkmenistan, E. Iran, Afghanistan, Bangladesh (Sub-species: fasciatus).

== Literature ==
- Bauer, A.M. 2003 On the status of the name Oligodon taeniolatus (Jerdon, 1853) and its long-ignored senior synonym and secondary homonym, Oligodon taeniolatus (Daudin, 1803). Hamadryad 27: 205–213.
- Boulenger, George A. 1890 The Fauna of British India, Including Ceylon and Burma. Reptilia and Batrachia. Taylor & Francis, London, xviii, 541 pp.
- Dotsenko I B 1984 Morphological characters and ecological peculiarities of Oligodon taeniolatus (Serpentes, Colubridae). Vestnik Zoologii 1984 (4): 23-26
- Jerdon, T.C. 1853 Catalogue of the Reptiles inhabiting the Peninsula of India. Part 2. J. Asiat. Soc. Bengal xxii: 522-534 [1853]
- Wall, Frank 1921 Ophidia Taprobanica or the Snakes of Ceylon. Colombo Mus. (H. R. Cottle, govt. printer), Colombo. xxii, 581 pages
