= Hemidactylus aemulus =

Scientific classification
- Kingdom: Animalia
- Phylum: Chordata
- Class: Reptilia
- Order: Squamata
- Suborder: Gekkota
- Family: Gekkonidae
- Genus: Hemidactylus
- Species: H. aemulus

Binomial name
- Hemidactylus aemulus Kumar, Srinivasulu, & Srinivasulu, 2022

Species of lizard

Hemidactylus aemulus is a species of gecko. It is endemic to India.
