= Gleadow's house gecko =

Scientific classification
- Kingdom: Animalia
- Phylum: Chordata
- Class: Reptilia
- Order: Squamata
- Suborder: Gekkota
- Family: Gekkonidae
- Genus: Hemidactylus
- Species: H. gleadowi

Binomial name
- Hemidactylus gleadowi Murray, 1884

Synonyms
- Hemidactylus gleadovii

Species of lizard

Gleadow's house gecko (Hemidactylus gleadowi) is a species of gecko. It is endemic to India and Pakistan.
