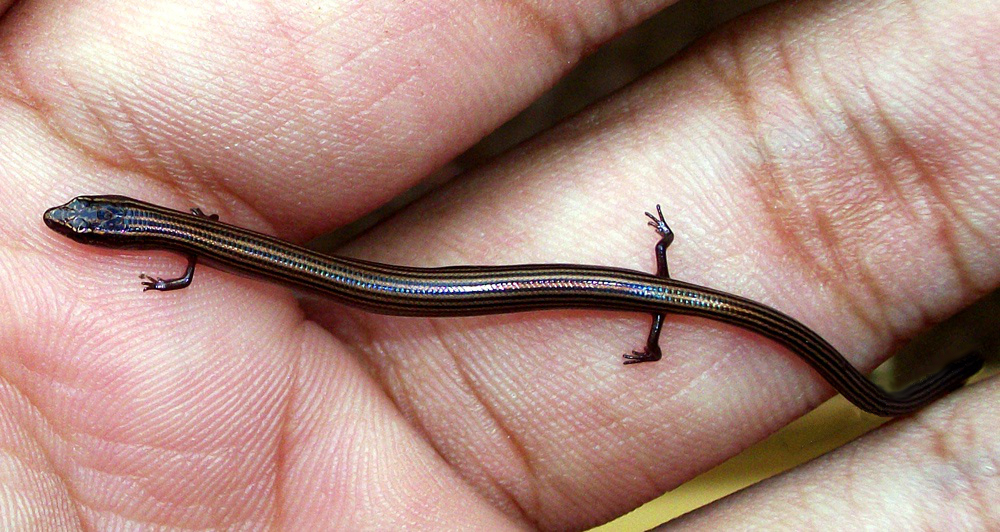

Conservation status
- Least Concern (IUCN 3.1)

Scientific classification
- Kingdom: Animalia
- Phylum: Chordata
- Class: Reptilia
- Order: Squamata
- Suborder: Scinciformata
- Infraorder: Scincomorpha
- Family: Scincidae
- Genus: Riopa
- Species: R. lineata

Binomial name
- Riopa lineata Gray, 1839

= Riopa lineata =

Species of lizard

Riopa lineata, the lined writhing skink or lined supple skink, is a species of writhing skink. It is known from India (the northern Western Ghats), Bangladesh and Myanmar (= Burma). This skink grows to about 6 cm in length. The body colouration is golden and each scale has a black dot forming longitudinal stripes on the body. It is known to occur from Gujarat to north of Karnataka. In Mumbai this skink has been observed in the Sanjay Gandhi National Park and Aarey milk colony. It is often found under rocks, loose soil associated with termite mounds and ant hills. It is crepuscular. A captive individual accepted termites, mosquito, house flies, ant eggs for about 45 days and was released.
