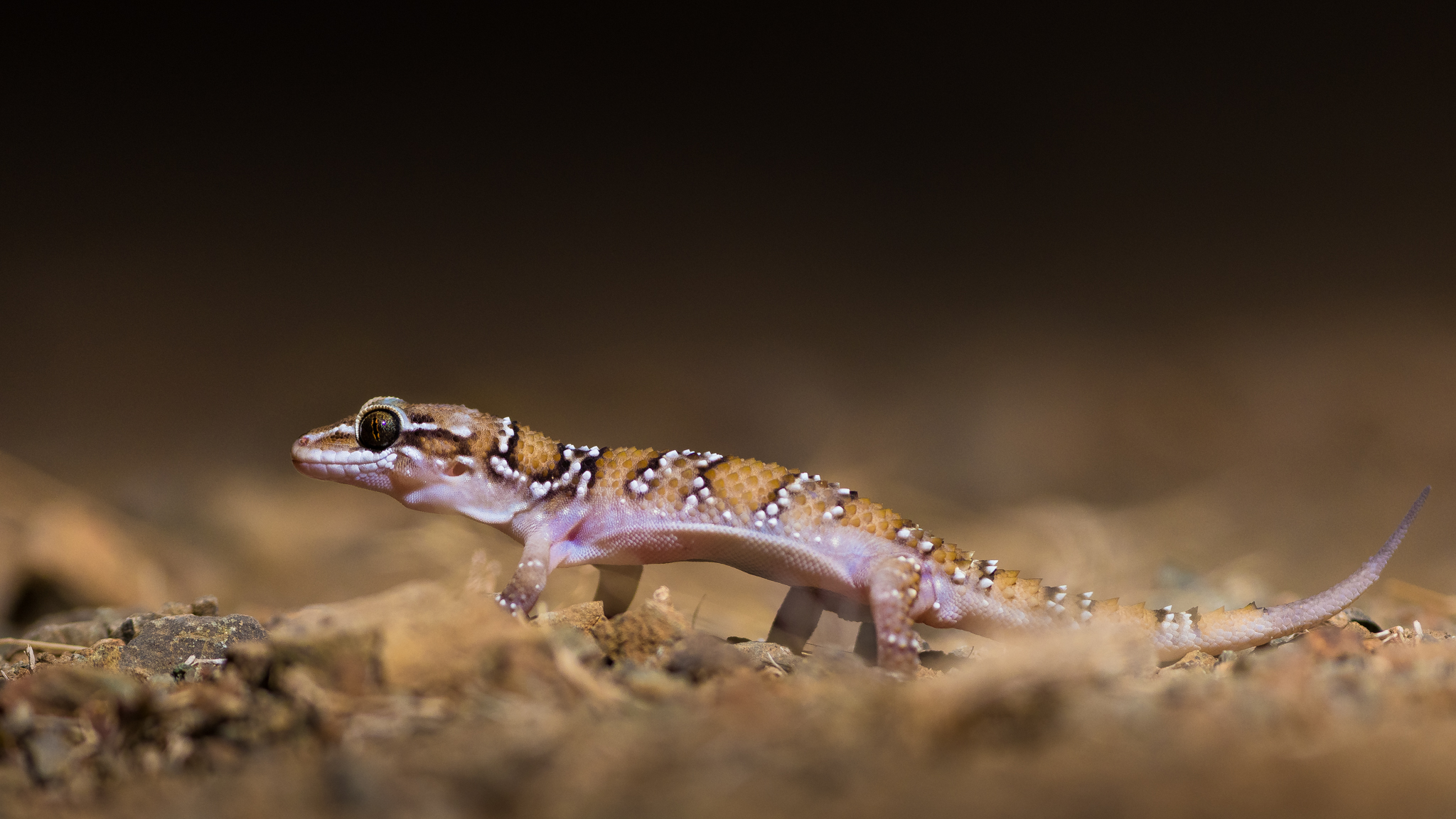

Scientific classification
- Kingdom: Animalia
- Phylum: Chordata
- Class: Reptilia
- Order: Squamata
- Suborder: Gekkota
- Family: Gekkonidae
- Genus: Hemidactylus
- Species: H. sahgali

Binomial name
- Hemidactylus sahgali Mirza, Gowande, Patil, Ambekar, & Patel, 2018

= Hemidactylus sahgali =

Species of house gecko

Hemidactylus sahgali, also known as Sahgal's termite hill gecko, is a species of house gecko from India and Pakistan.
