= Hemidactylus xericolus =

Scientific classification
- Kingdom: Animalia
- Phylum: Chordata
- Class: Reptilia
- Order: Squamata
- Suborder: Gekkota
- Family: Gekkonidae
- Genus: Hemidactylus
- Species: H. xericolus

Binomial name
- Hemidactylus xericolus Lajmi, Giri, Singh, & Agarwal, 2020

Species of lizard

Hemidactylus xericolus the Nalgonda yellow-tailed brookiish gecko, is a species of house gecko from India.
