= Hemidactylus kangerensis =

Kanger valley rock gecko

Scientific classification
- Kingdom: Animalia
- Phylum: Chordata
- Class: Reptilia
- Order: Squamata
- Suborder: Gekkota
- Family: Gekkonidae
- Genus: Hemidactylus
- Species: H. kangerensis

Binomial name
- Hemidactylus kangerensis (Bhosale, Mirza & Patil, 2017)

Species of lizard

Hemidactylus kangerensis is a species of large geckos found in the Eastern Ghats of India.

Hemidactylus kangerensis named after the type location Kanger Ghati National Park.
