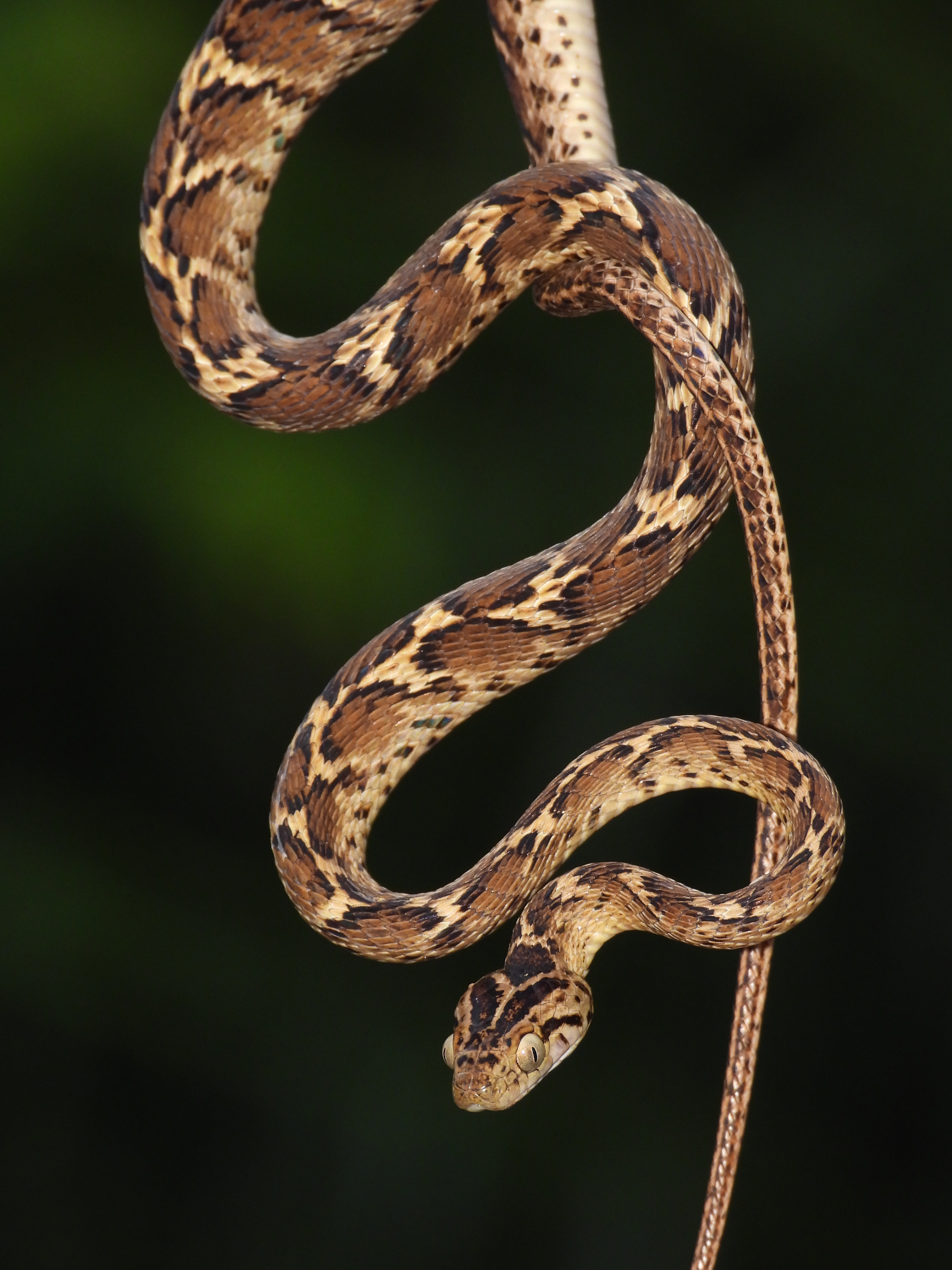
- Common cat snake from Raigad

Conservation status
- Least Concern (IUCN 3.1)

Scientific classification
- Kingdom: Animalia
- Phylum: Chordata
- Class: Reptilia
- Order: Squamata
- Suborder: Serpentes
- Family: Colubridae
- Genus: Boiga
- Species: B. trigonata

Binomial name
- Boiga trigonata (Schneider, 1802)
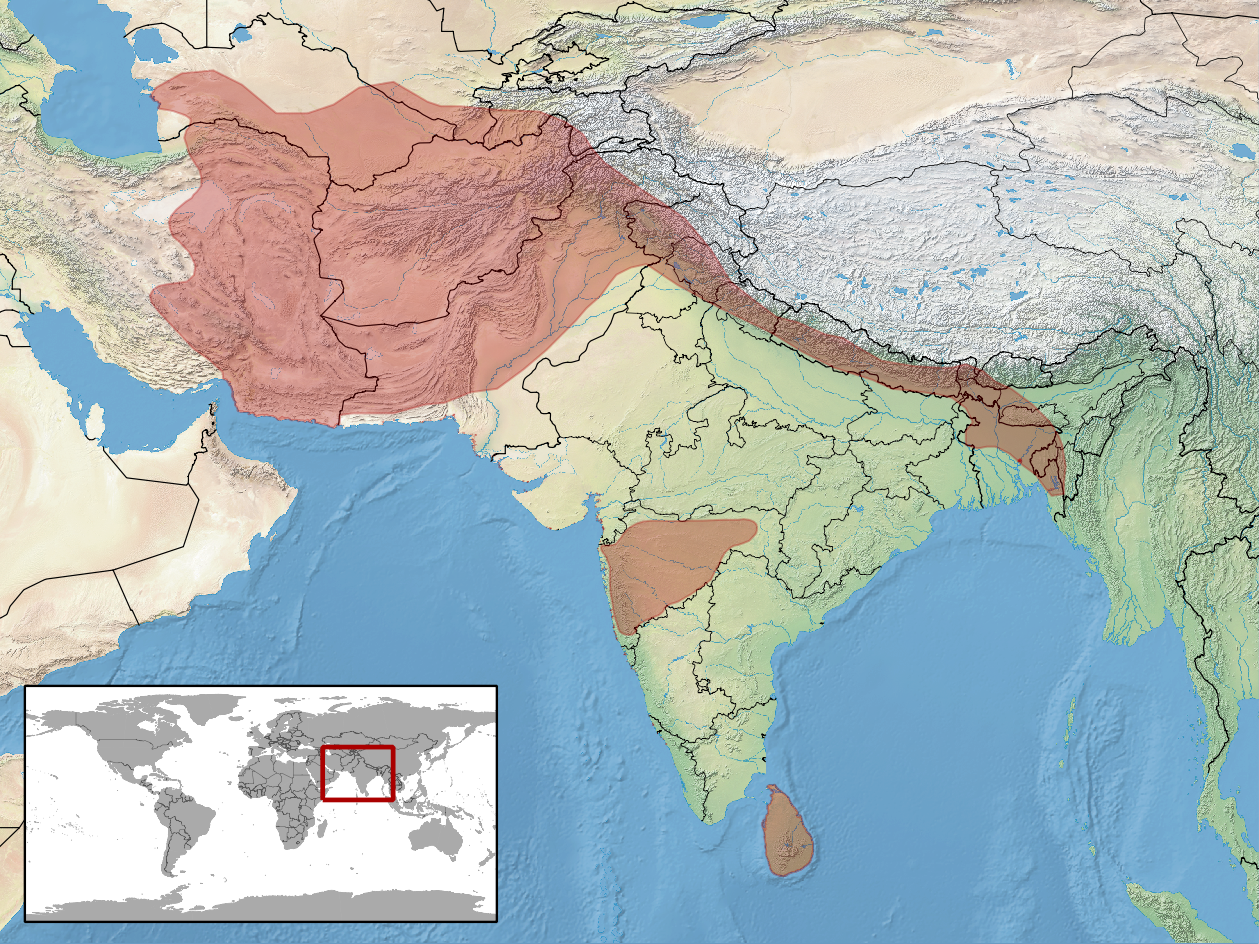

Synonyms
- Coluber trigonatus Schneider, 1802; Dipsas trigonata — F. Boie, 1827; Dipsadomorphus trigonatus — Günther, 1858; Boiga trigonata — M.A. Smith, 1943

= Boiga trigonata =

Species of snake

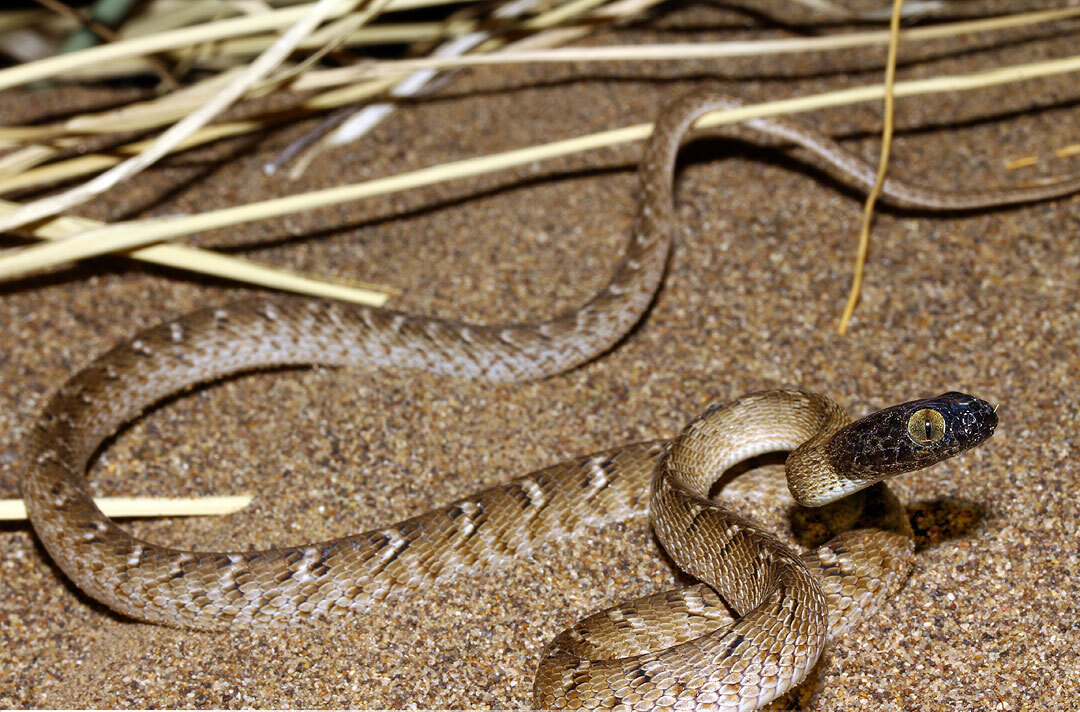

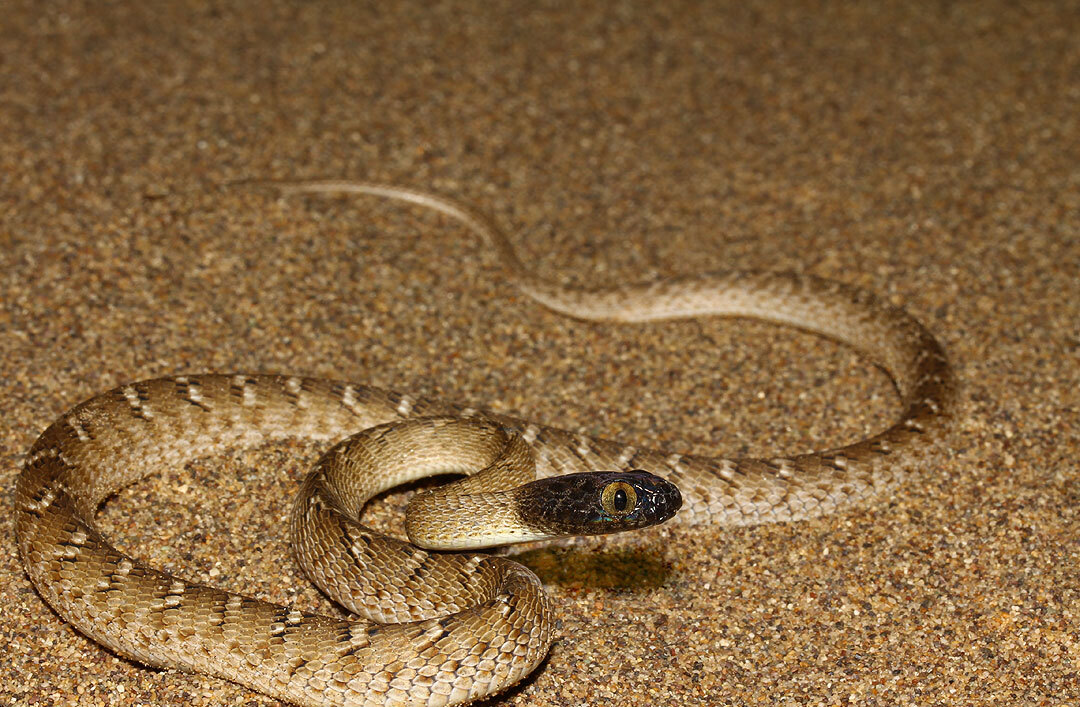

Boiga trigonata, commonly known as the Indian gamma snake or common cat snake, is a species of rear-fanged colubrid endemic to South Asia.

== Description ==
See snake scales for terms used

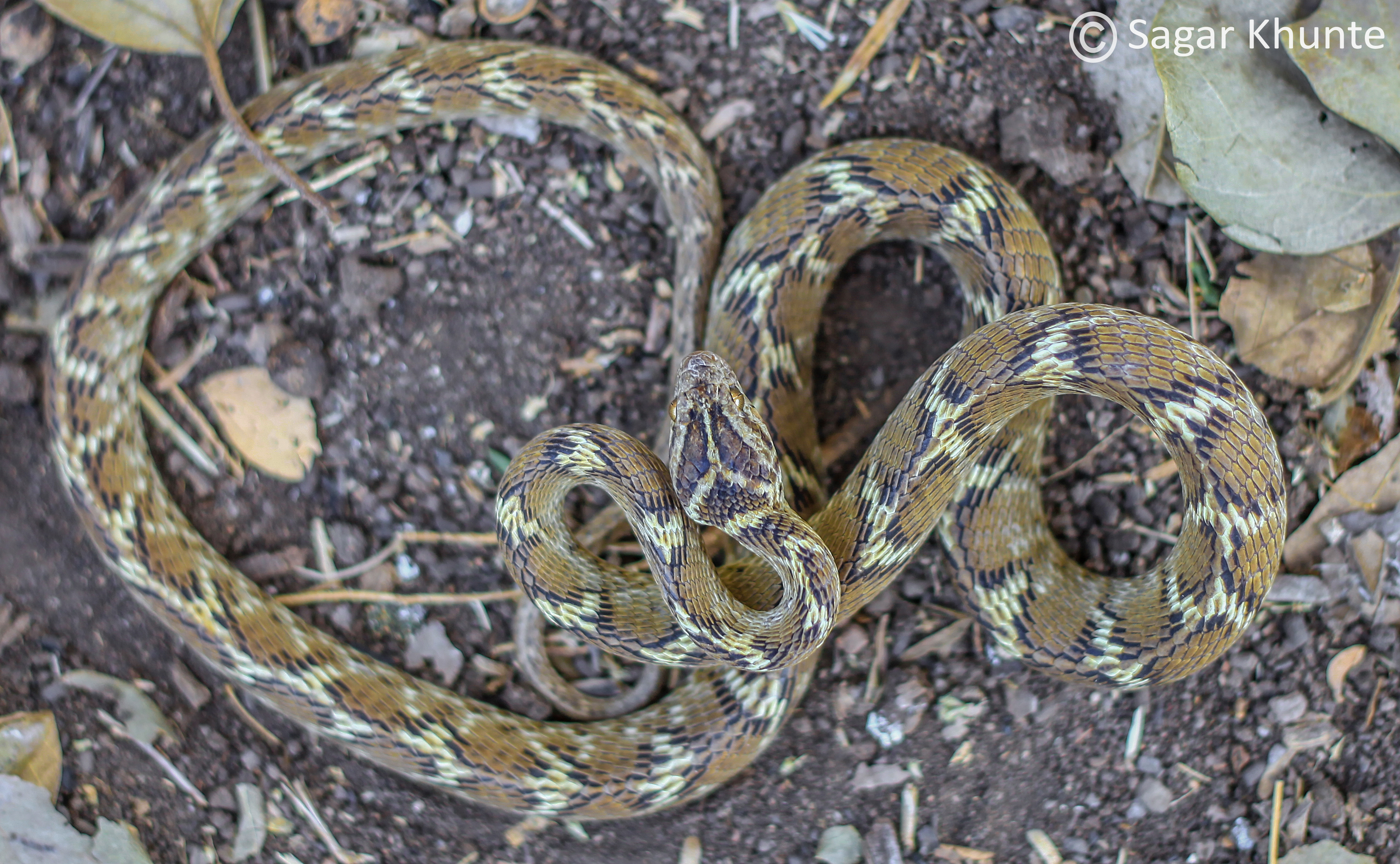
boiga trigonata (lonand, maharashtra)

Boiga trigonata has anterior palatine and mandibular teeth scarcely larger than the posterior. Its eyes are as long as the distance from its nostril, large and has vertical pupil; the rostral is broader than deep with the internasal scales shorter than the prefrontal scales. The frontal scales are longer than their distance from the end of the snout and shorter than the parietal scales. The loreals are as long as they are deep, or, they can be deeper than they are long. B. trigonata's one preocular does not extend to the upper surface of the head. The species has two postoculars, temporals 2+3, and 8 upper labials, with the third, fourth, and fifth entering the eye. They can have 4 or 5 lower labials in contact with the anterior chin-shields, which are about as long as the posterior. B. trigonata's body is moderately laterally compressed with smooth dorsal scales in 21 (or rarely 19) rows, with apical pits, disposed obliquely, with the vertebrals very feebly enlarged. There are 229–269 ventral scales, 79–92 divided subcaudal scales, and a single anal scale.

Boiga trigonata has a yellowish-olive or pale grey colour along the back and a white black-edged zigzag markings which may be connected. Top of head has a distinct, pale Y shaped mark, which is sometimes black-edged. Scales on top of head large, smooth, and of different shapes. The belly is white or tan and can have a series of small brown spots along each side.

The total length is around 3 feet (91 cm) with a 7-inch (18 cm) tail.

== Geographic range ==
Boiga trigonata type locality is the Perso-Baluchistan frontier.

It is distributed throughout Sri Lanka, India, Pakistan, Nepal, Bangladesh, Afghanistan (Leviton 1959: 461), southern Turkmenistan, southern Uzbekistan, southeastern Tajikistan, and Iran.

The race melanocephala is found in Pakistan; this form is variously considered as a subspecies, color variant, or full species.

== Mimicry ==
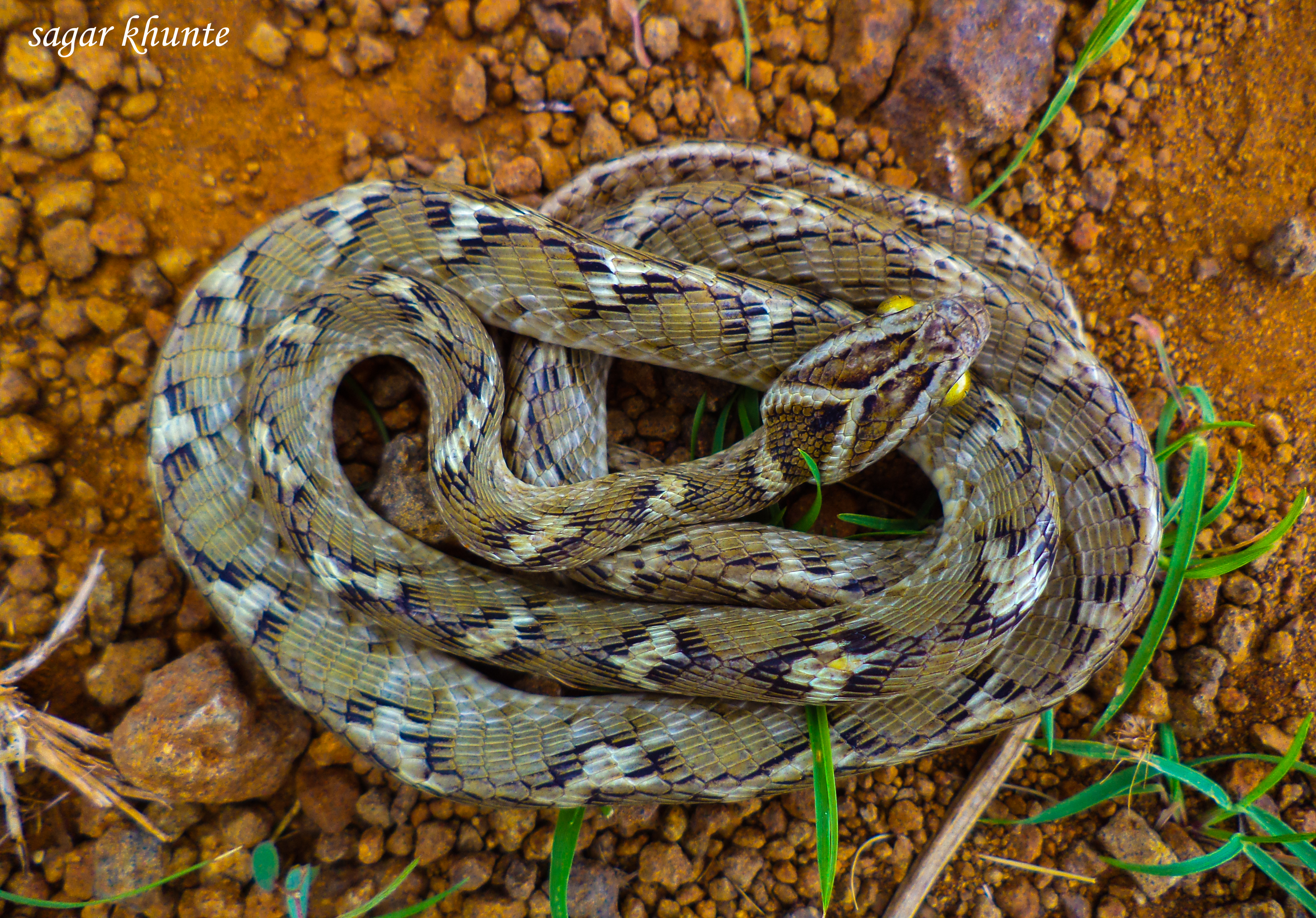
Boiga trigonata (satara, maharashtra)

Boiga trigonata strongly resembles venomous Echis carinatus in coloration and shape. Also, in India, these two species have almost identical geographic ranges.

== Diet and behavior ==
It is nocturnal and spends the day coiled up in palmyra fronds, among bushes, in thatched roofs, under tree bark or stones. Is an excellent climber. Common in many areas, often in houses, but, like other nocturnal snakes, it is rarely seen.

Rear-fanged. Mild venom can paralyze small prey (lizards, mice, and small birds). When disturbed, may coil tightly, strike repeatedly, and vibrate tail.
