= Hemidactylus flavicauda =

Scientific classification
- Kingdom: Animalia
- Phylum: Chordata
- Class: Reptilia
- Order: Squamata
- Suborder: Gekkota
- Family: Gekkonidae
- Genus: Hemidactylus
- Species: H. flavicauda

Binomial name
- Hemidactylus flavicauda Lajmi, Giri, Singh, & Agarwal, 2020

Species of lizard

Hemidactylus flavicauda the Mahabubnagar yellow-tailed brookiish gecko, is a species of house gecko from India.
