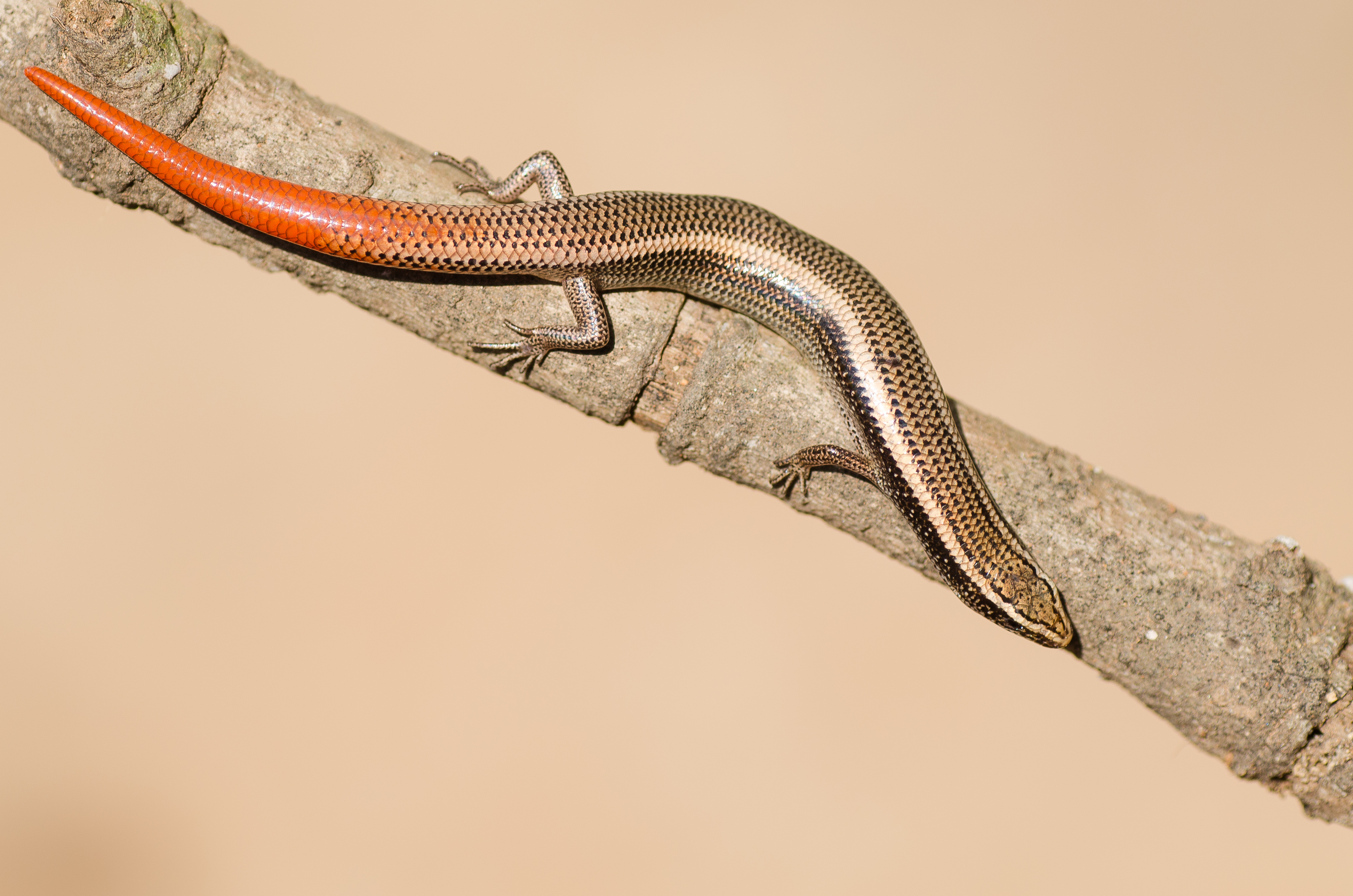
- juvenile.

Scientific classification
- Kingdom: Animalia
- Phylum: Chordata
- Class: Reptilia
- Order: Squamata
- Family: Scincidae
- Genus: Riopa
- Species: R. punctata

Binomial name
- Riopa punctata (Linnaeus, 1758)

Synonyms
- Riopa punctata

= Riopa punctata =

Species of lizard

Riopa punctata, also known as the common dotted garden skink, common snake skink, punctate supple skink, or spotted supple skink is a species of skink found in Bangladesh, India, Nepal, Pakistan, Vietnam and Sri Lanka.

== Description ==
Young skinks of this species have a distinctive red tail, but this colour is lost in adults. The red tail is replaced by small spots and these spots coalesce to form continuous lines as the individual ages. The dots are present on the head and extends to the snout.

Distance between the end of snout and the fore-limb about 2 to 2/3 of the distance between axilla and groin; the snout is obtuse; lower eyelid has an undivided semitransparent disc; supranasals entire and are in contact with one another behind the rostral; frontal longer than the frontoparietals and interparietal together; a pair of nuchals, rarely absent; an enlarged temporal scale borders the outer margin of the parietal; ear-opening about half as large as the eye-opening, with one or two minute lobules anteriorly; 7 supralabials. the fifth below the middle of the eye, longer than the adjacent labials body covered with smooth subequal scales, 24 or 20, rarely 28, round the body; 62 to 76 down the middle of the hack; marginal preanals slightly enlarged. The adpressed limbs fail to meet by nearly twice the length of the fore-limb; digits long, fourth toe distinctly longer than the third; 11 to 14 keeled lamellae under the fourth toe. Tail thick at the base, a little longer than the head and body. Brown above and on the side. Each scale with a dark basal spot. In the young the spots are joined into 4 or 6 longitudinal lines down the back. A yellowish dorsolateral streak beginning on the canthus rostralis strongly marked in the young. Lower surfaces yellowish-white, uniform, or each scale with a black central dot; tail reddish in the young.

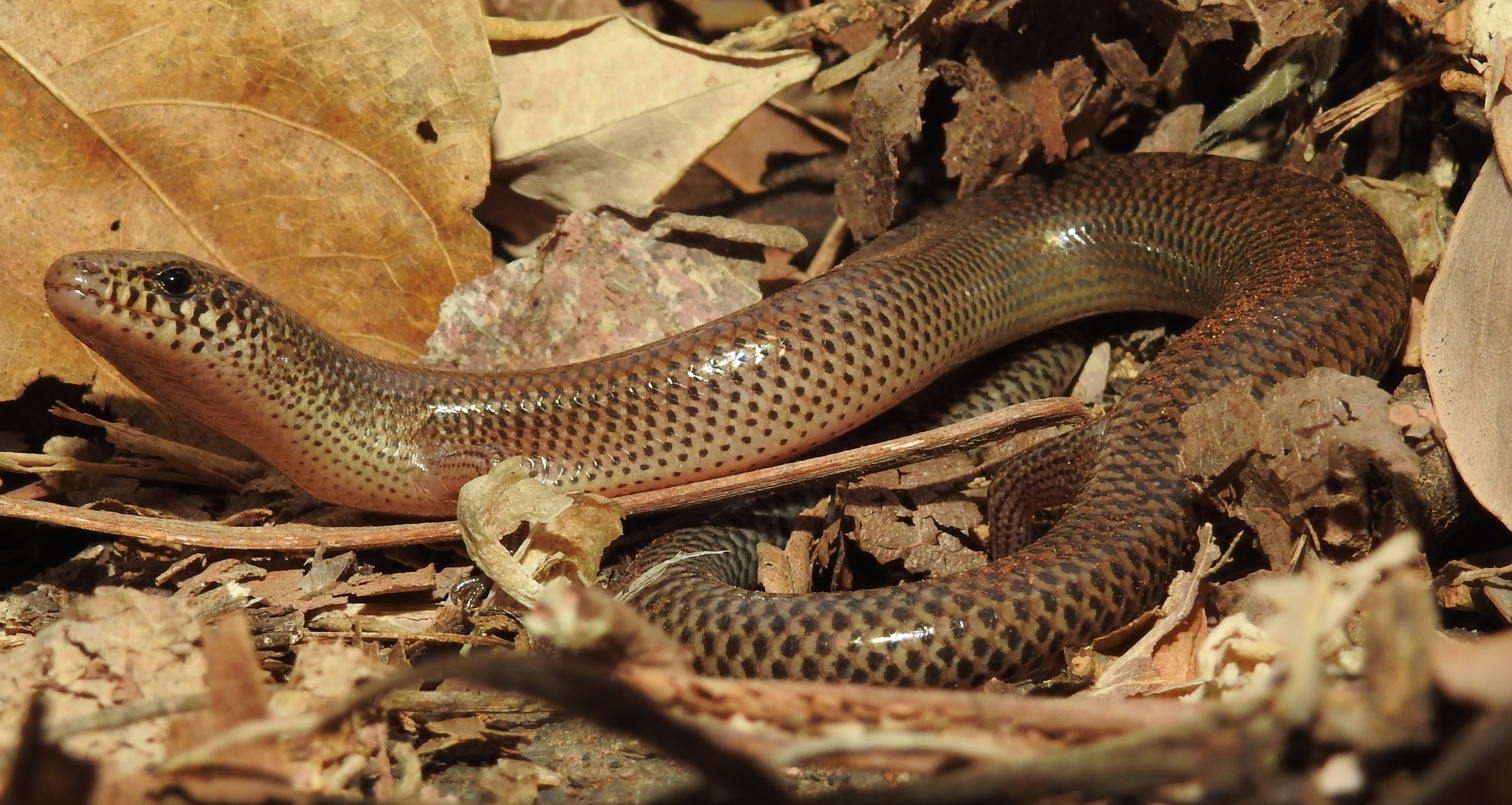
Adult in BNHS Conservation Education Centre, Goregaon, Mumbai. Sanjay Gandhi National Park.

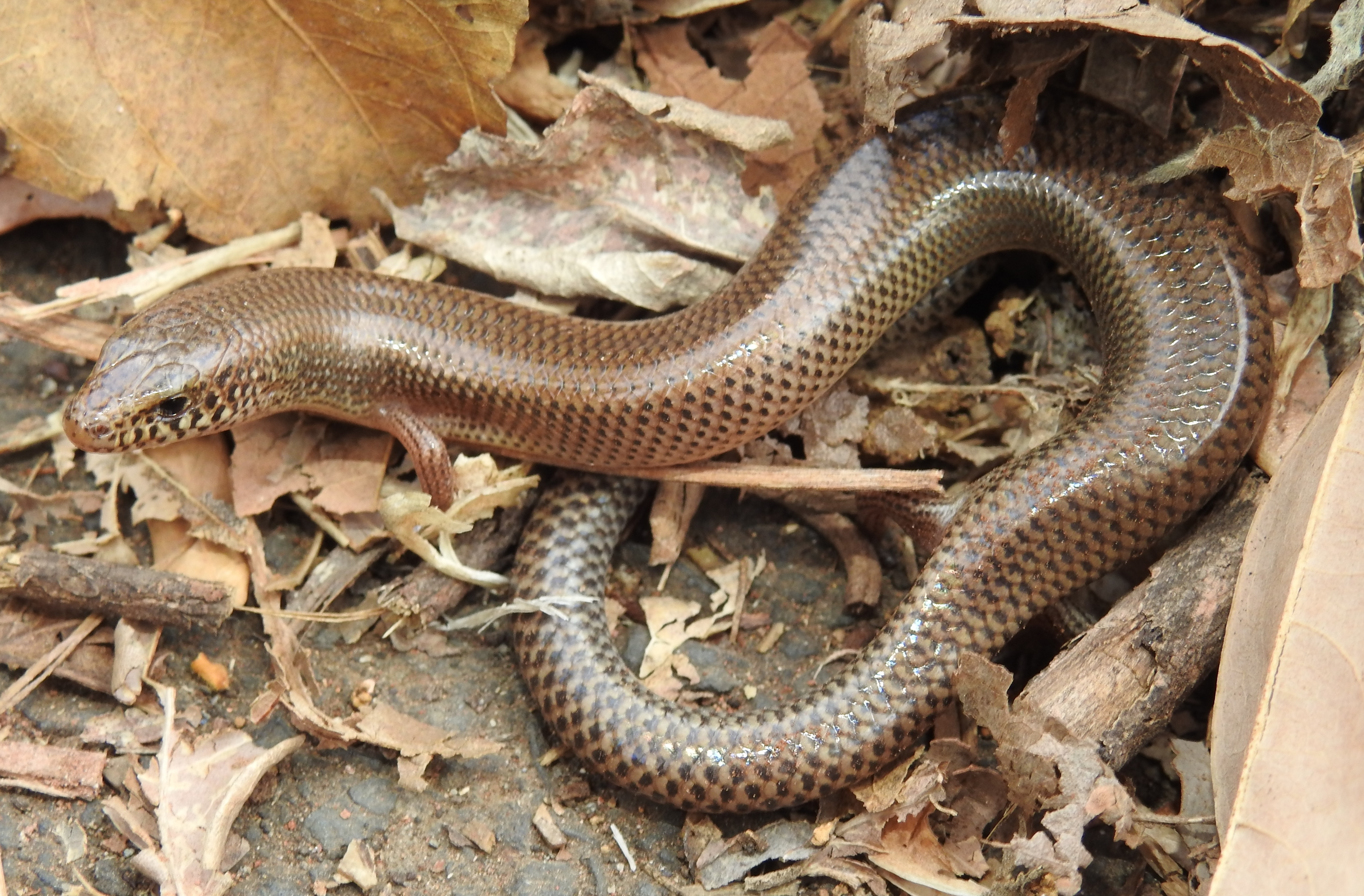
Same adult in BNHS Conservation Education Centre

== Distribution ==
Found in Bangladesh, Nepal, Pakistan, Vietnam, India and Sri Lanka, mostly in hilly regions such as the Yelagiris, Nilgiris, Sivagiris, Shevaroy Hills, Nilambur, Madurai, Cuddapah, Salem, Belgaum, Godavari districts. Chaibassa, Bilaspur, Rewa, Allahabad, Hazara, Meerut, Subathu (Simla).

== Taxonomic history ==
When Carl Linnaeus first described the species Lacerta punctata in the 1758 10th edition of Systema Naturae, he based his description on material from two different species. In 2003, a lectotype was chosen to stabilise the nomenclature, separating the Asian species now called Lygosoma punctata from the African species which had previously been known by that name, but which must now be referred to as Mabuya homalocephala.
