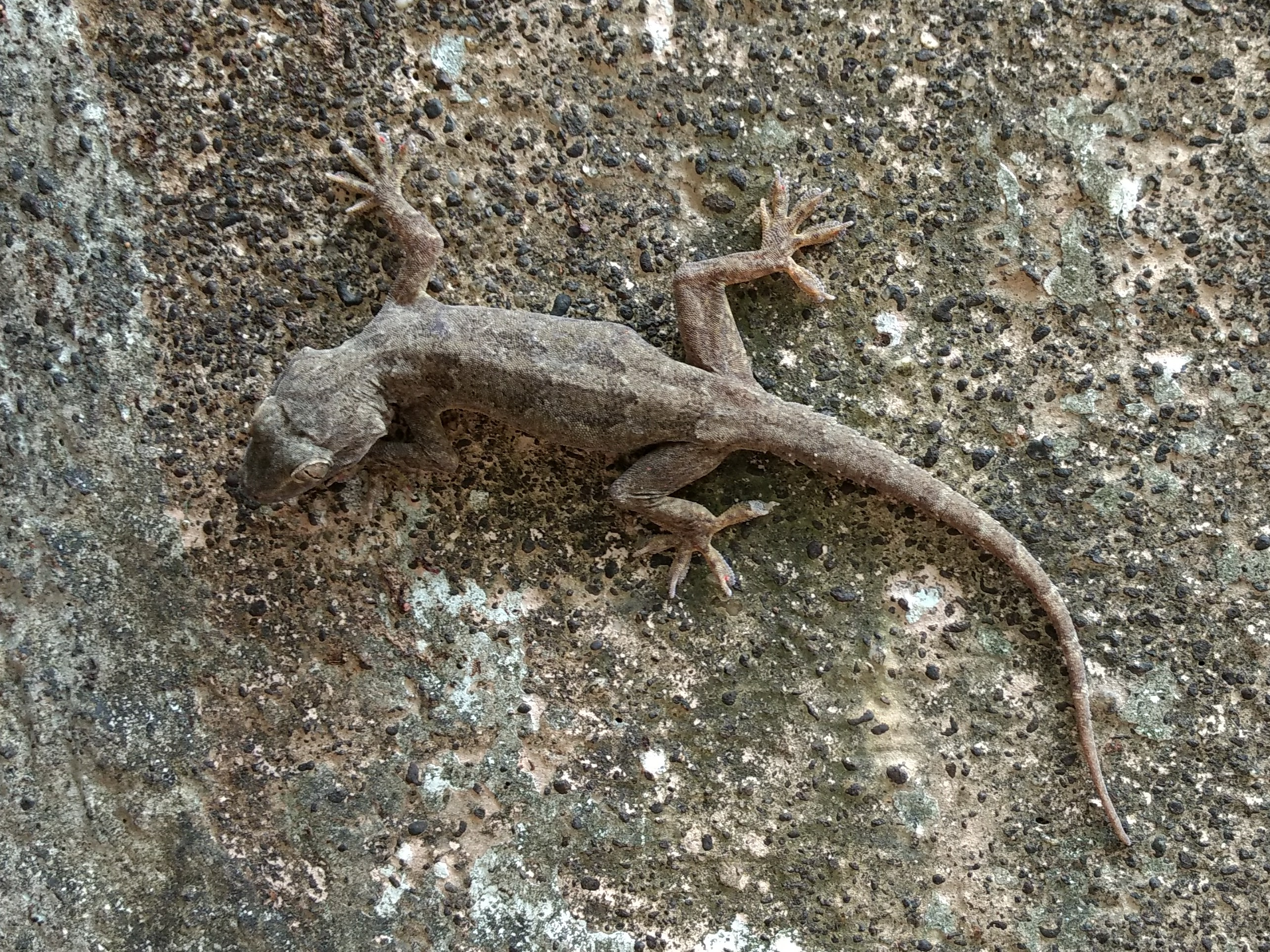

Conservation status
- Least Concern (IUCN 3.1)

Scientific classification
- Kingdom: Animalia
- Phylum: Chordata
- Class: Reptilia
- Order: Squamata
- Suborder: Gekkota
- Family: Gekkonidae
- Genus: Hemidactylus
- Species: H. leschenaultii

Binomial name
- Hemidactylus leschenaultii A.M.C. Duméril & Bibron, 1836

Synonyms
- Hemidactylus leschenaultii A.M.C. Duméril & Bibron, 1836; Hemidactylus bellii Gray, 1845; Hemidactylus pustulosus Lichtenstein & von Martens, 1856; Hemidactylus kelaartii Theobald, 1868; Hemidactylus marmoratus Blanford, 1870; Hemidactylus leschenaultii — Boulenger, 1885

= Leschenault's leaf-toed gecko =

Species of lizard

Leschenault's leaf-toed gecko (Hemidactylus leschenaultii) is a species of gecko, a lizard in the family Gekkonidae. The species is native to South Asia and parts of West Asia. It is often found inside homes. Its scientific name commemorates French botanist Jean Baptiste Leschenault de la Tour.

== Description ==
H. leschenaultii has the following characters. Snout longer than the distance between the eye and the ear-opening, 1.33 to 1.40 times the diameter of the orbit; forehead concave, the supraorbital ridges prominent in full-grown specimens; ear-opening rather large, oval, vertical. Body and limbs moderate. A slight fold of the skin on the side of the belly, from axilla to groin. Digits free, strongly dilated, inner well developed; 6 or 7 (rarely 5) lamellae under the inner digits, 9 to 11 under the median. Head covered with minute granules posteriorly, with larger ones anteriorly; rostral four-sided, not twice as broad as deep, with median cleft above; nostril pierced between the rostral, three nasals, and generally the first labial; 10 to 12 upper and 8 or 9 lower labials; mental large, triangular or pentagonal; two pairs of chin-shields, the inner the larger and in contact behind the mental. Upper surface of body covered with small granules, uniform or intermixed with more or less numerous scattered round tubercles. Abdominal scales moderate, cycloid, imbricate. Male with a series of femoral pores interrupted on the preanal region; 12 to 16 pores on each side. Tail depressed, flat below, covered above with small smooth scales and six longitudinal series of conical tubercles; beneath with a median series of transversely dilated plates.

Grey above, with darker markings, forming undulating cross-bars, rhomboidal spots on the middle of the back, or regular longitudinal bands; a dark band from the eye to the shoulder; lower surfaces white.

From snout to vent 3.20 in (8.1 cm); tail 3.25 in (8.3 cm).

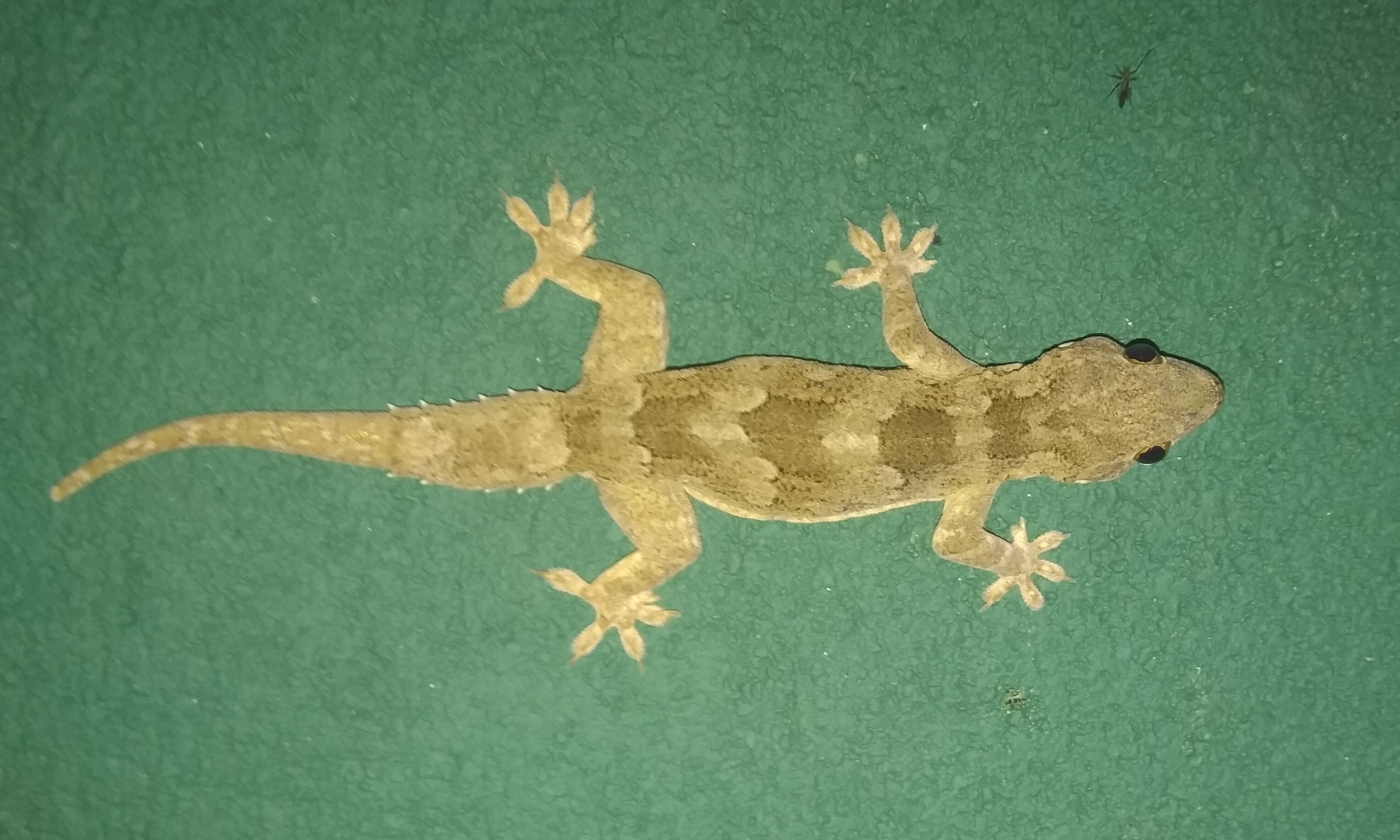
from Sri Lanka

== Geographic range ==
H. leschenaultii is found in southern India, Sri Lanka, Pakistan, and Oman.

Type locality: Ceylon.

== Habitat ==
The preferred natural habitat of H. leschenaultii is forest, at altitudes from sea level to 1,000 m (3,280 ft).

== Behavior ==
H. leschenaulti is arboreal.

== Reproduction ==
H. leschenaultii is oviparous.
