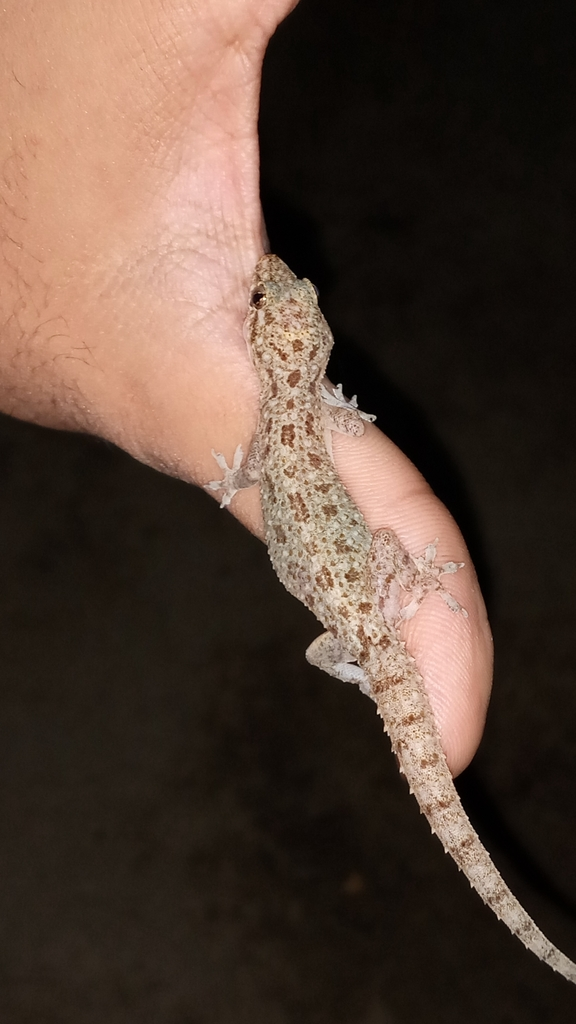

Scientific classification
- Kingdom: Animalia
- Phylum: Chordata
- Class: Reptilia
- Order: Squamata
- Suborder: Gekkota
- Family: Gekkonidae
- Genus: Hemidactylus
- Species: H. murrayi

Binomial name
- Hemidactylus murrayi Gleadow, 1887

= Murray's house gecko =

Species of lizard

Murray's house gecko (Hemidactylus murrayi) is a species of gecko. It is found in western India, Myanmar, and Malaysia. It was previously considered conspecific with Hemidactylus brookii but revalidated by Lajmi and colleagues in 2016. Its status remains unclear because the types are lost.

The specific name murrayi honours James A. Murray, a British zoologist.
