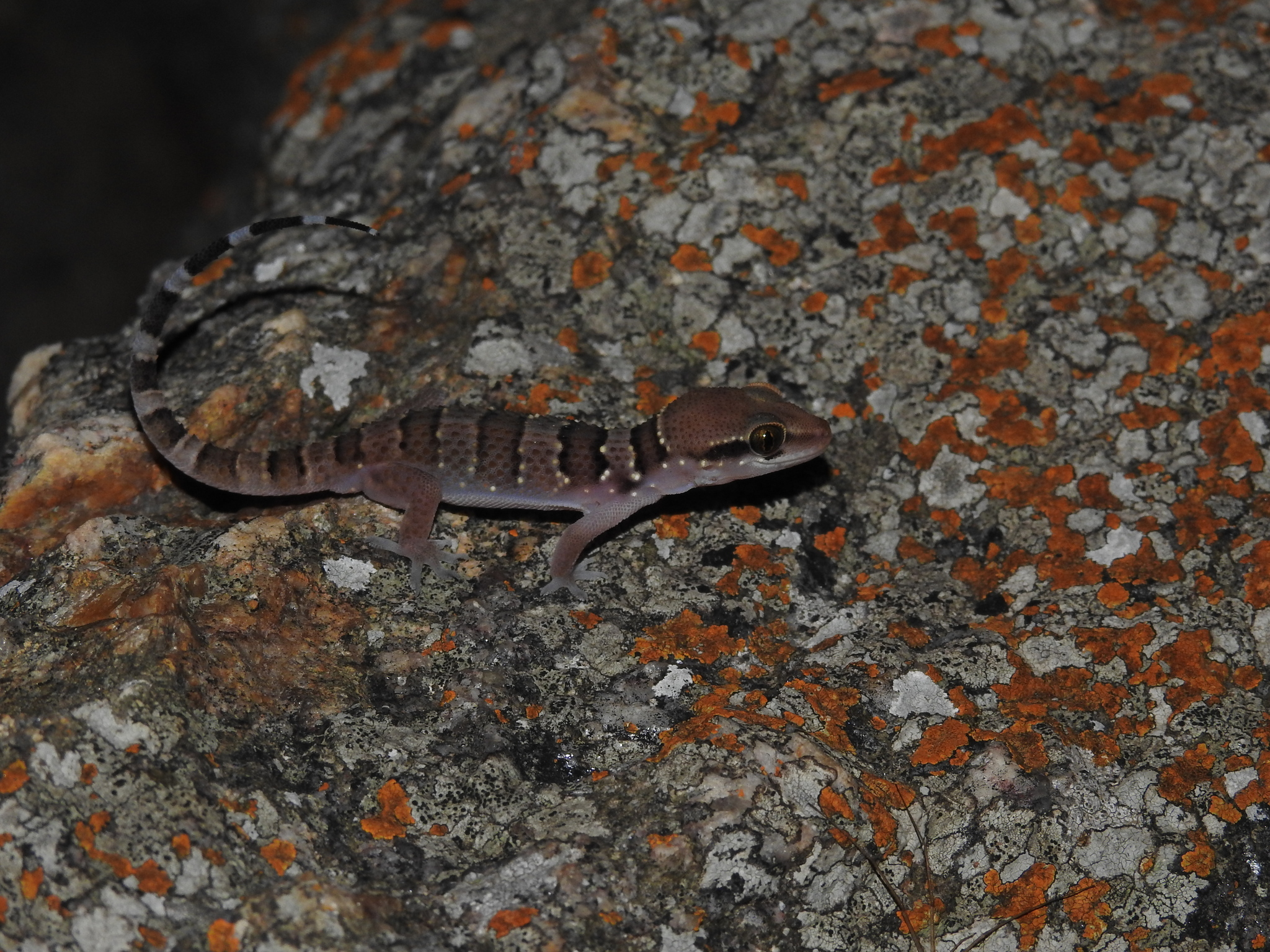
- From Nandi Hills, Karnataka, India.

Conservation status
- Least Concern (IUCN 3.1)

Scientific classification
- Kingdom: Animalia
- Phylum: Chordata
- Class: Reptilia
- Order: Squamata
- Suborder: Gekkota
- Family: Gekkonidae
- Genus: Hemidactylus
- Species: H. whitakeri

Binomial name
- Hemidactylus whitakeri Mirza, Gowande, Patil, Ambekar, & Patel, 2018

= Hemidactylus whitakeri =

Species of house gecko

Hemidactylus whitakeri, also known as Whitaker's termite hill gecko, is a species of house gecko from India.
