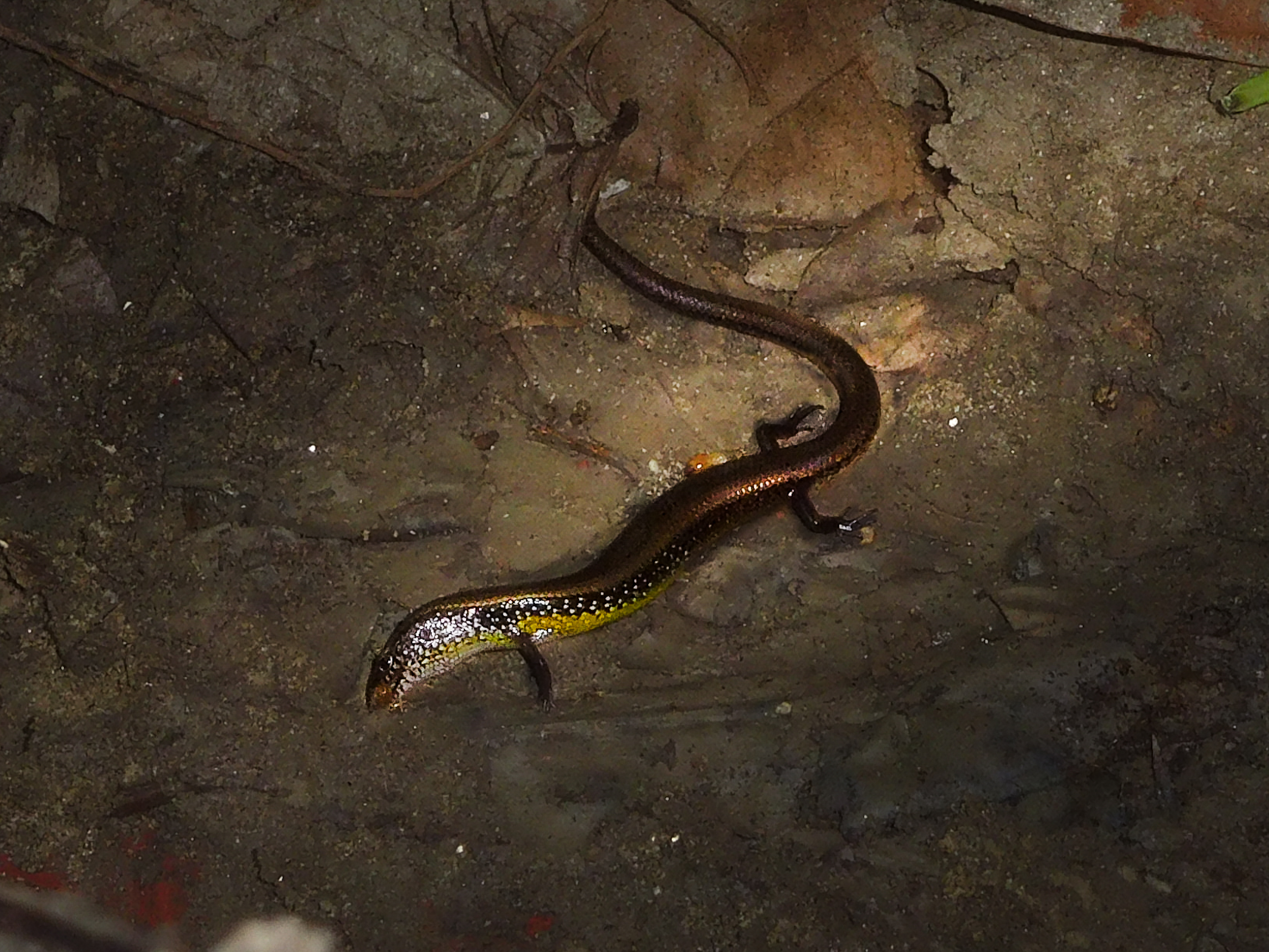

Scientific classification
- Kingdom: Animalia
- Phylum: Chordata
- Class: Reptilia
- Order: Squamata
- Family: Scincidae
- Genus: Riopa
- Species: R. albopunctata

Binomial name
- Riopa albopunctata (Gray, 1846)

= White-spotted supple skink =

Species of lizard

The white-spotted supple skink (Riopa albopunctata) is a species of diurnal, terrestrial, insectivorous skink found in parts of tropical Asia. This species was first described by John Edward Gray based on type specimen collected by T. C. Jerdon from Madras, in the Coromandel Coast of South India.

== Description ==
The white-spotted supple skink is a small lizard found in South Asia, especially in countries like India, Bangladesh, Nepal, and Sri Lanka.

Appearance

This skink has a long, slender body with small and weak legs. Its head is short and rounded. The area between its nose and front legs is about 2 to 2.5 times longer than the area between its front and back legs.

Its lower eyelids are covered with scales, unlike some lizards that have clear lower eyelids. The scales on its head have special names and shapes, used by scientists to identify the species. It has:

- A short snout.
- Four supraoculars (scales above the eyes).
- Seven or eight supraciliaries (scales above the eyelid), with the first and last being the largest.
- A small ear opening that is oval-shaped, with tiny lobes in front.
- There are 26 or 28 smooth scales around the middle of the body, and the preanal scales (near the vent) are not very different from the other body scales.

Its legs are short:

- The front leg, when stretched, can reach the ear or just beyond
- The hind leg is short, fitting 2.3 to 3 times between the front and back legs
- The fourth toe is longer than the third
- There are 12 to 15 tiny plates (lamellae) under the fourth toe, with faint ridges
- The tail is thick and slightly longer than the head and body combined.

Color

- The top side of the body is light brown or reddish-brown
- The sides are dotted with tiny black spots
- Each back scale has a small dark dot, forming lines along the back
- The sides of the neck and front body have white spots
- The belly is pale yellow or white

== Distribution ==
It is found in mainland India except perhaps the Thar Desert and Himalayas; distribution continues and on to Bhutan, Bangladesh, Nepal, Indochina, Vietnam, Malaysia and even the islands of Maldives.
