= Treutler's gecko =

Conservation status
- Least Concern (IUCN 3.1)

Scientific classification
- Kingdom: Animalia
- Phylum: Chordata
- Class: Reptilia
- Order: Squamata
- Suborder: Gekkota
- Family: Gekkonidae
- Genus: Hemidactylus
- Species: H. treutleri

Binomial name
- Hemidactylus treutleri Mahony, 2009

Species of lizard

Treutler's gecko (Hemidactylus treutleri) is a species of lizard in the family Gekkonidae. The species is endemic to India.

== Etymology ==
The specific name, treutleri, is in honor of German-born Irish herpetoculturist Uli Treutler (1951–2006).

== Geographic range ==
H. treutleri is found in the southern Indian states of Andhra Pradesh and Telangana.

== Habitat ==
The preferred natural habitats of H. treutleri are forest and shrubland, at altitudes of 350–720 m (1,150–2,360 ft).
