= List of reptiles of South Asia =

The following is a list of reptiles in and around the Indian subcontinent, primarily covering the South Asian countries of India, Pakistan, Nepal, Sri Lanka, Bangladesh, Bhutan, Afghanistan, parts of Myanmar and the Andaman and Nicobar Island chains.

== Order Crocodilia ==
=== Family Crocodilidae ===
- Mugger crocodile (Crocodylus palustris) India, Pakistan, Nepal, Sri Lanka, Bangladesh, Myanmar
- Saltwater crocodile (Crocodylus porosus) India (east coast and the Andamans), Sri Lanka, Myanmar, Thailand, Malaysia, Bangladesh

=== Family Gavialiidae ===
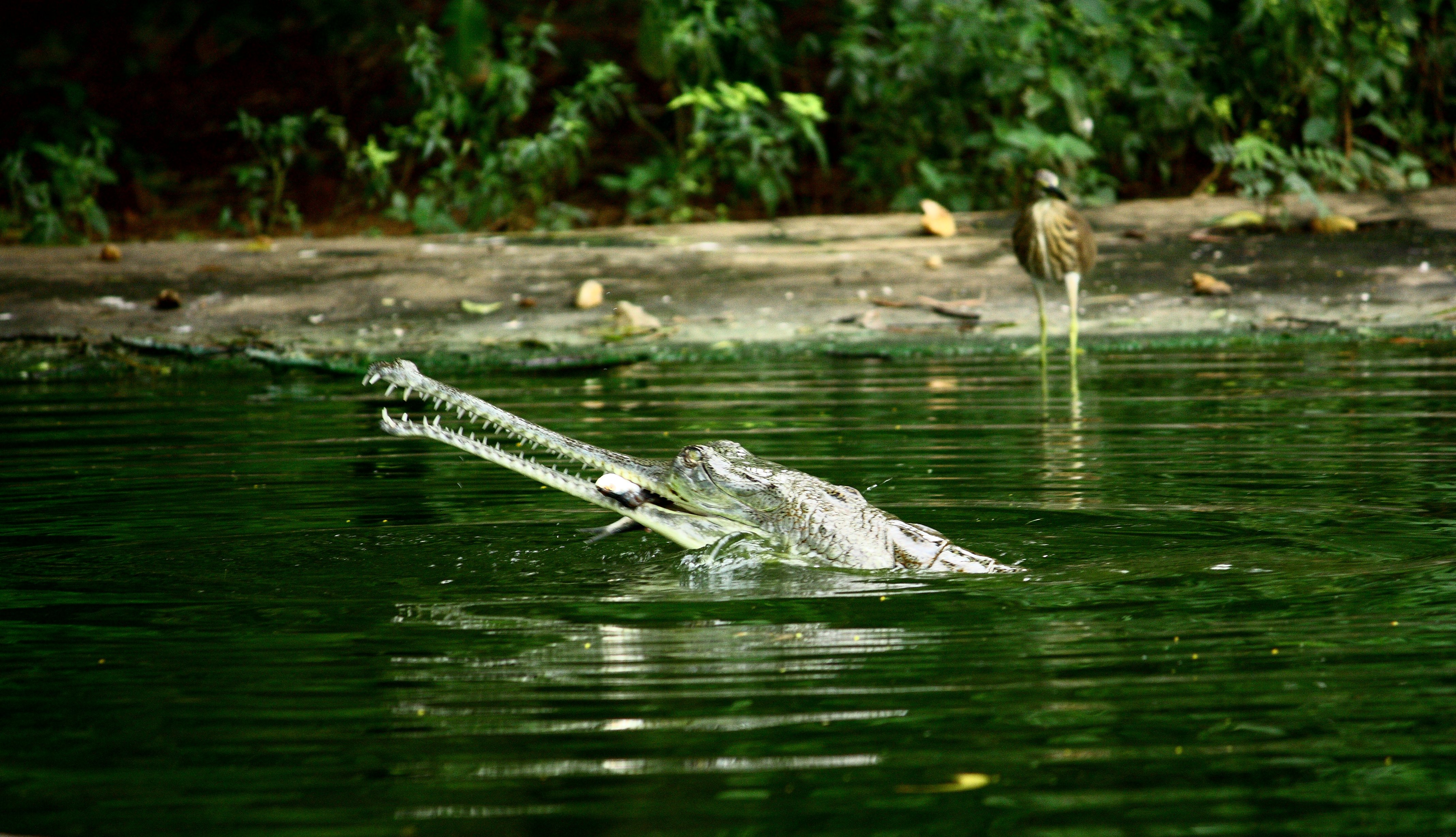
Gharial (Gavialis gangeticus)

- Gharial Gavialis gangeticus India, Pakistan, Nepal, Bangladesh

== Order Testudines ==
=== Family Dermochelyidae ===
- Leatherback sea turtle Dermochelys coriacea global

=== Family Cheloniidae ===
- Loggerhead sea turtle Caretta caretta tropical regions
- Green turtle Chelonia mydas tropical regions
- Hawksbill sea turtle Eretmochelys imbricata tropical regions
- Olive ridley sea turtle Lepidochelys olivacea tropical regions
- Flatback sea turtle Natator depressus south-east Indonesia

=== Family Testudinidae ===
- Indian star tortoise (Geochelone elegans) India
- Elongated tortoise (Indotestudo elongata) India, Nepal, Bangladesh, Myanmar, Malay peninsula, Indo-China
- Travancore tortoise (Indotestudo travancorica) Western Ghats
- Asian brown tortoise (Manouria emys) India, Bangladesh, Malay region
- Impressed tortoise (Manouria impressa) India (Arunachal Pradesh)
- Central Asian tortoise (Testudo horsfieldii) Pakistan, Afghanistan

=== Family Geoemydidae ===
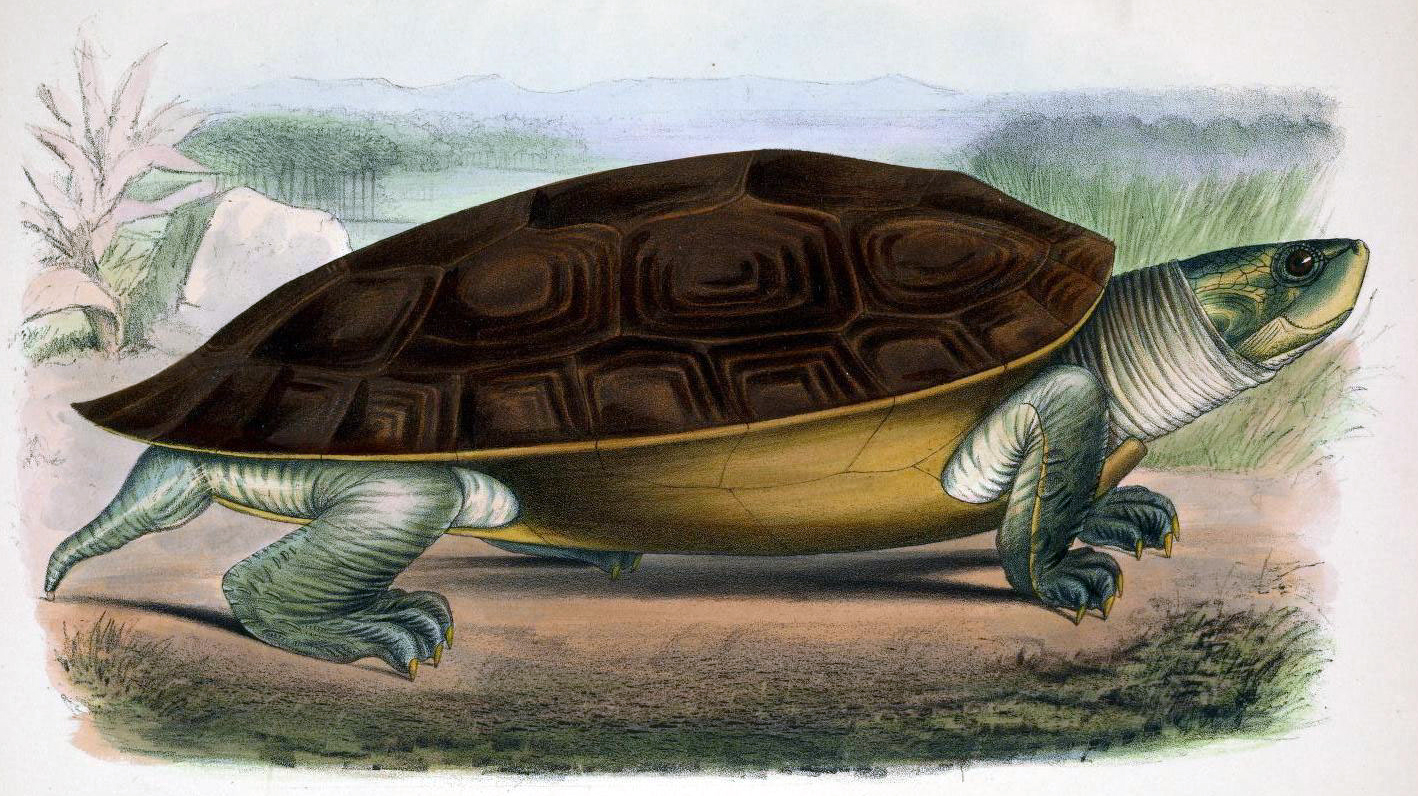
River terrapin (Batagur baska)

- River terrapin Batagur baska India (Sundarbans, Bhitarkanika), Bangladesh, Malay peninsula, Indo-China, Sumatra
- Malayan box turtle Cuora amboinensis India (Northeast, Nicobar Islands) Bangladesh, Malay peninsula, Indo-China, the Sundas, Maluku, Philippines
- Asian leaf turtle Cyclemys dentata Northeast India, Bangladesh, China, Indo-China, Malay peninsula, Indo-Malay, the Sundas, Philippines
- Oldham's leaf turtle Cyclemys oldhami Bangladesh, Cambodia, China, India, Indonesia, Laos, Malaysia, Myanmar, Thailand & Vietnam
- Spotted pond turtle Geoclemys hamiltonii Pakistan, India, Bangladesh, Nepal
- Cochin forest cane turtle Vijayachelys silvatica (=Geoemyda silvatica) Southwest India
- Crowned river turtle Hardella thurjii Pakistan, India, Bangladesh
- Three-striped roofed turtle Kachuga dhongoka North India, Nepal, Bangladesh
- Painted roofed turtle Kachuga kachuga North India, Nepal, Bangladesh
- Brown roofed turtle Kachuga smithii Pakistan, North India, Nepal, Bangladesh
- Assam roofed turtle Kachuga sylhetensis Northeast India, Bangladesh
- Indian roofed turtle Kachuga tecta Pakistan, North India, Nepal, Bangladesh
- Indian tent turtle Kachuga tentoria India, Bangladesh
- Tricarinate hill turtle Melanochelys tricarinata India, Nepal, Bangladesh
- Indian black turtle Melanochelys trijuga India, Nepal, Sri Lanka, Bangladesh, Myanmar, Thailand
- Indian eyed turtle Morenia petersi Eastern India, Bangladesh
- Malayan flat-shelled turtle Notochelys platynota
- Keeled box turtle Pyxidea mouhotii
- Arakan forest turtle Heosemys depressa

=== Family Trionychidae ===
- Indian softshell turtle Aspideretes gangeticus Pakistan, India, Nepal, Bangladesh
- Indian peacock softshell turtle Aspideretes hurum India, Nepal, Bangladesh
- Leith's softshell turtle Aspideretes leithii Peninsular India
- Black softshell turtle Aspideretes nigricans Chittagong city tank in southeast Bangladesh
- Narrow-headed softshell turtle Chitra indica Pakistan, India, Nepal, Bangladesh
- Indian flapshell turtle Lissemys punctata Pakistan, India, Nepal, Bangladesh, Sri Lanka, Myanmar
- Asian giant softshell turtle Pelochelys cantorii India (coasts), Malay peninsula, Indo-China, South China

== Order Squamata ==
=== Suborder Lacertilia ===
==== Family Eublepharidae ====
- Indian fat-tailed gecko Eublepharis fuscus Western India
- Hardwicke's fat-tailed gecko Eublepharis hardwickii Eastern and central India
- Pakistani leopard gecko Eublepharis macularius Pakistan, Northwest India

==== Family Gekkonidae ====
- Böhme's mountain gecko Alsophylax boehmei
- Baluch rock gecko Bunopus tuberculatus Afghanistan, Pakistan, India, Nepal
- Indian golden gecko Calodactylodes aureus Eastern Ghats
- Sri Lankan golden gecko Calodactylus illingworthi Sri Lanka
- Assamese day geckoCnemaspis assamensis, Assam
- Beddome's day gecko Cnemaspis beddomei
- Boie's day gecko Cnemaspis boiei
- Goan day gecko Cnemaspis goaensis
- Gund day gecko Cnemaspis heteropholis
- Indian day gecko Cnemaspis indica
- Indraneil day gecko Cnemaspis indraneildasii
- Jerdon's day gecko Cnemaspis jerdonii
- Kandy day gecko, Cnemaspis kandiana
- Kolhapur day gecko, Cnemaspis kolhapurensis
- Coastal day gecko Cnemaspis littoralis
- Ponmudi day gecko Cnemaspis nairi
- Ornate day gecko Cnemaspis ornata
- Cnemaspis otai
- Sispara day gecko Cnemaspis sisparensis
- Rough-bellied day gecko Cnemaspis tropidogaster
- Wynaad day gecko Cnemaspis wynadensis
- Yercaud day gecko Cnemaspis yercaudensis
- Flat-tailed gecko Cosymbotus platyurus Bhutan, India, Nepal, Sri Lanka, China, Indo-China, Malay region
- Sind gecko Crossobamon orientalis
- Cyrtodactylus adleri
- Cyrtodactylus aravallensis
- Kollegal ground gecko Geckoella collegalensis
- Gunther's Indian gecko Cyrtodactylus deccanensis
- Giant forest gecko Cyrtodactylus frenatus Sri Lanka
- Sikkim bent-toed gecko Cyrtodactylus gubernatoris
- Khasi Hills bent-toed gecko Cyrtodactylus khasiensis
- Jammu bent-toed gecko Cyrtodactylus mansarulus
- Geckoella nebulosa (=Gymnodactlus nebulosus, Cyrtodactylus nebulosus)
- Cyrtodactylus nepalensis
- Malayan forest gecko Cyrtodactylus pulchellus
- Andamans bent-toed gecko Cyrtodactylus rubidus India (Andamans)
- Frontier bow-fingered gecko Cyrtodactylus stoliczkai
- Mediodactylus walli
- Cyrtopodion baturensis
- Banded bent-toed gecko Cyrtopodion fasciolatus
- Himalayan bent-toed gecko Cyrtopodion himalayanus
- Kutch gecko Cyrtopodion kachhensis
- Lawder's bent-toed gecko Cyrtopodion lawderanus
- Rough-tailed gecko Cyrtopodion scabrum
- Siamese leaf-toed gecko Dixonius siamensis
- Patinghe Indian gecko Geckoella jeyporensis
- Devil gecko Geckoella yakhuna Sri Lanka
- Four-clawed gecko Gehyra mutilata South India, Sri Lanka, Myanmar, Indo-China, Malay region
- Tokay gecko Gekko gekko Northeast India, Indo-China, China, Malay region
- Smith's giant gecko Gekko smithii India (Nicobar), Myanmar, Thailand, Malay region
- Andamanese giant gecko Gekko verreauxi India (Andamans)
- White-striped viper gecko Hemidactylus albofasciatus
- Hemidactylus anamallensis
- Bowring's gecko Hemidactylus bowringii Eastern India, Myanmar, China
- Brook's gecko Hemidactylus brookii Pakistan, India, Sri Lanka, Nepal, Bhutan, Myanmar, Singapore, Malay region
- Depressed gecko Hemidactylus depressus Sri Lanka
- Yellow-spotted gecko Hemidactylus flaviviridis Pakistan, India, Iran
- Asian house gecko Hemidactylus frenatus South India, Sri Lanka, Indo-China, China, Malay region, tropical areas
- Giant leaf-toed gecko Hemidactylus giganteus
- Garnott's gecko Hemidactylus garnotii Northeast India, Bhutan, Nepal, Malay region
- Graceful leaf-toed gecko Hemidactylus gracilis
- Carrot-tail viper gecko Hemidactylus imbricatus
- Marbled tree gecko Hemidactylus leschenaultii Pakistan, India, Sri Lanka
- Burmese leaf-toed gecko Hemidactylus karenorum
- Spotted rock gecko Hemidactylus maculatus Southwest India, Sri Lanka
- Hemidactylus mahendrai
- Smith's bent-toed gecko Hemidactylus malcolmsmithi
- Persian leaf-toed gecko Hemidactylus persicus
- Hemidactylus porbandarensis
- Bombay leaf-toed gecko Hemidactylus prashadi
- Reticulate leaf-toed gecko Hemidactylus reticulatus
- Scaly gecko Hemidactylus scabriceps South India, Sri Lanka
- Hemidactylus subtriedrus
- Termite hill gecko Hemidactylus triedrus Pakistan, India
- Mediterranean house gecko Hemidactylus turcicus
- Hemiphyllodactylus aurantiacus
- Indopacific tree gecko Hemiphyllodactylus typus
- Mourning gecko Lepidodactylus lugubris
- Andaman day gecko Phelsuma andamanense India (Andamans)
- Nicobar gliding gecko Ptychozoon nicobarensis India (Nicobar)
- Smooth-backed gliding gecko Ptychozoon lionotum

==== Family Agamidae ====
- Laungwala long-headed lizard (Bufoniceps laungwalaensis) Rajasthan
- Green crestless forest lizard (Calotes andamanensis) Andaman and Nicobar Islands, India
- Orange-lipped forest lizard (Calotes aurantolabium) Southern Western Ghats, sp. nov.
- Green forest lizard (Calotes calotes) South India, Sri Lanka
- Emma gray's forest lizard (Calotes emma) northeast India.
- Large scaled forest lizard (Calotes grandisquamis) Western Ghats
- Jerdon's forest lizard (Calotes jerdoni) India (Khasi hills, Meghalaya), Myanmar, China
- Khasi Hills forest lizard (Calotes maria) India, Bangladesh
- Indo-Chinese forest lizard (Calotes mystaceus) Northeast India, Myanmar, Thailand, Cambodia, Vietnam
- Nilgiri forest lizard (Calotes nemoricola) India
- Black-lipped forest lizard (Calotes nigrilabris) Sri Lanka
- Oriental garden lizard (Calotes versicolor) Afghanistan, Pakistan, India (Andamans), Sri Lanka, Nepal, Bangladesh, Malay peninsula, Indo-China, China, Sumatra
- Rough-horned lizard (Ceratophora aspera) Sri Lanka
- Small-horned lizard (Cophotis ceylanica) Sri Lanka
- Bay Islands forest lizard (Coryphophylax subcristatus) India (Andaman and Nicobar islands)
- Blanford's flying lizard (Draco blanfordii) Northeast India, Bangladesh, Myanmar, Thailand, Malay peninsula
- South Indian flying lizard (Draco dussumieri) Western Ghats, India
- Tubercled agama (Laudakia tuberculata) Afghanistan, Pakistan, India, Nepal
- Hump-nosed lizard (Lyriocephalus scutatus) Sri Lanka
- Elliot's forest lizard (Monilesaurus ellioti) India.
- Roux forest lizard (Monilesaurus rouxii) India
- Indian kangaroo lizard (Otocryptis beddomei) India
- Sri Lankan kangaroo lizard (Otocryptis wiegmanni) Sri Lanka
- Rock lizard (Psammophilus dorsalis) South India
- Blanford's rock lizard (Psammophilus blanfordanus) South India
- Horsfield's spiny lizard (Salea horsfieldii) South India
- Anaimalai spiny lizard (Salea anamallayana) South India
- Fan-throated lizard (Sitana ponticeriana) India
- Sitana visiri
- Sitana laticeps
- Sitana spinaecephalus
- Sarada darwini
- Sarada superba
- Sitana marudhamneydhal
- Agile agama (Trapelus agilis) Iran, Afghanistan, Pakistan, Northwest India
- Indian spiny-tailed lizard (Uromastyx hardwickii) Pakistan, Northwest India

==== Family Chamaeleonidae ====
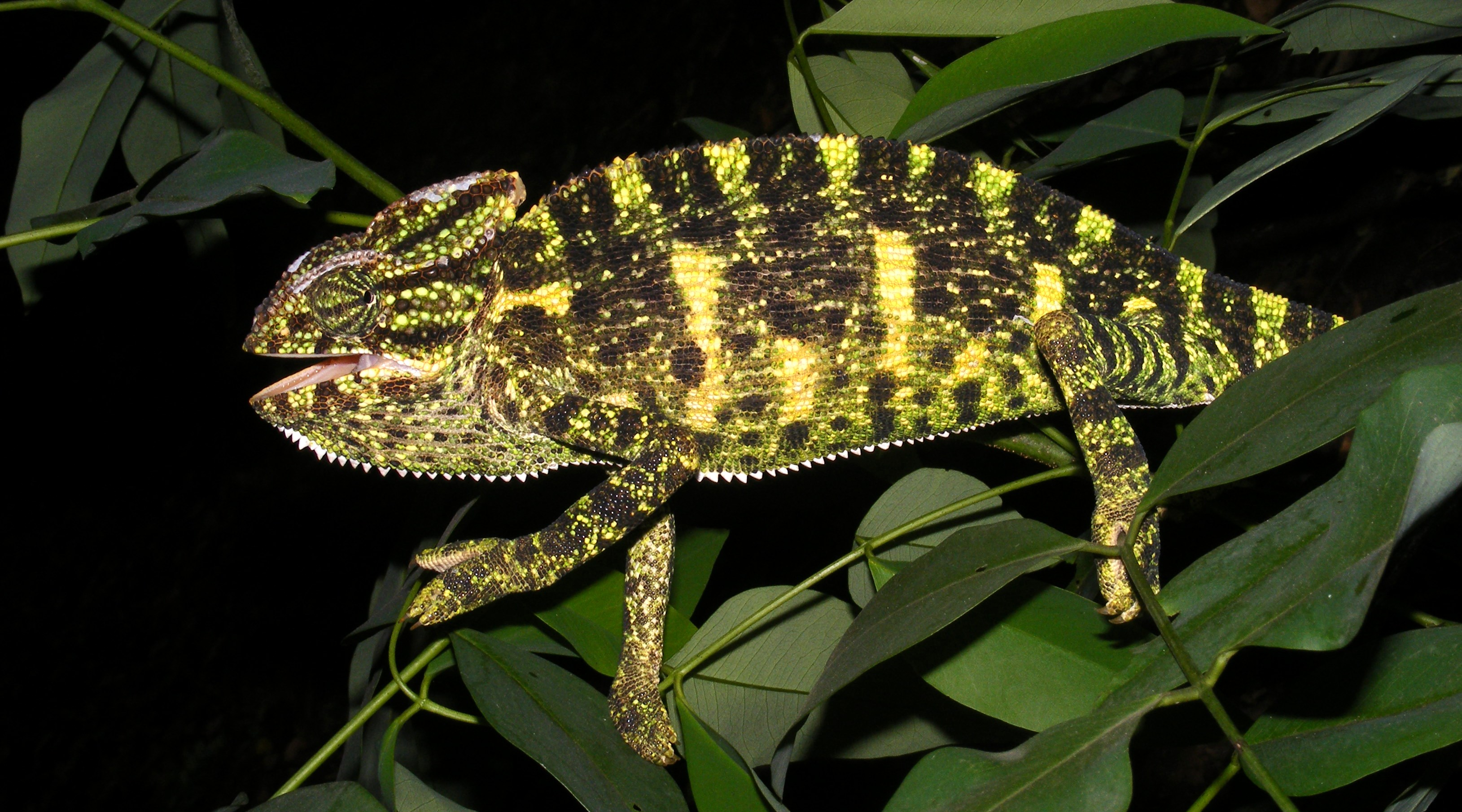
Indian chameleon (Chamaeleo zeylanicus)

- Indian chamaeleon Chamaeleo zeylanicus Pakistan, India, Sri Lanka

==== Family Dibamidae ====
- Dibamus nicobaricum

==== Family Anguidae ====
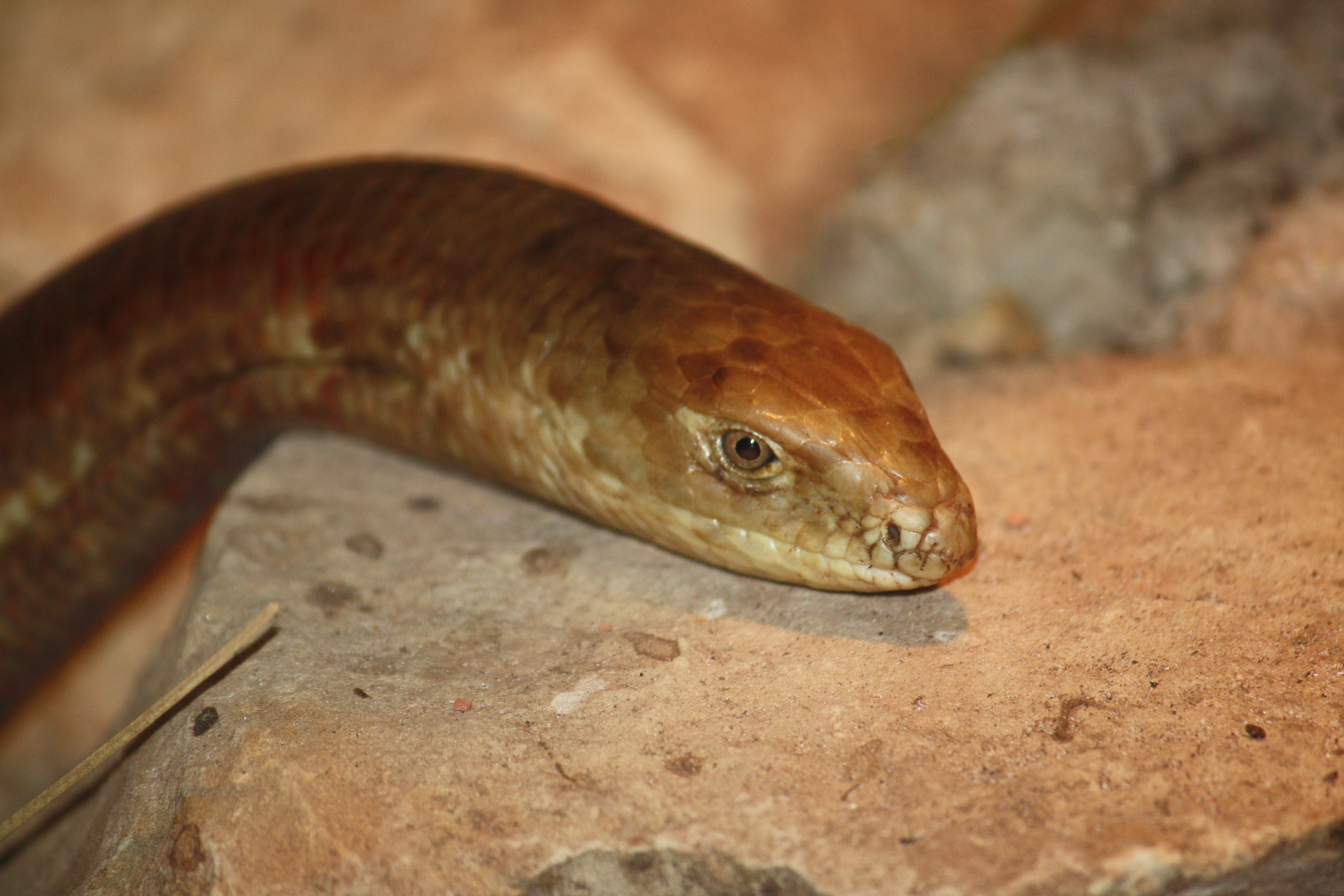
Armoured glass snake (Ophisaurus apodus)

- Armoured glass snake Ophisaurus apodus Eurasia, Afghanistan, Pakistan
- Eastern glass snake Dopasia gracilis India (Himalayas, Northeast), Myanmar

==== Family Scincidae ====
Note: Some authors move the Asian skinks of the genus Mabuya to Eutropis.

- Minor snake-eyed skink Ablepharus grayanus
- Asian snake-eyed skink Ablepharus pannonicus
- Asymblepharus tragbulense
- Barkud limbless skink Barkudia insularis India (East coast)
- Barkudia melanosticta
- Four-toed snake skink Chalcidoseps thwaitesii Sri Lanka
- Chalcides pentadactylus
- Dasia subcaeruleum Southwest India
- Dasia johsinghi Southwest India,
- Tree skink Dasia haliana Sri Lanka
- Olive tree skink Dasia olivacea India (Nicobars), Myanmar, Indo-China, Malay region
- Dasia nicobarensis
- Olive tree skink Dasia olivacea
- Boulenger's dasia Dasia subcaerulea
- Schneider's skink Eumeces schneiderii (Daudin, 1802)
- Eumeces blythianus
- Poona skink Eurylepis poonaensis (Sharma, 1970)
- Alpine Punjab skink Eurylepis taeniolatus Blyth, 1854
- Sharma's mabuya Eutropis nagarjuni (Sharma, 1969) Andhra Pradesh
- Kelaart's slender skink Lankascincus taprobanensis Sri Lanka
- Big-eared lipinia Lipinia macrotympanum (Stoliczka, 1873)
- Four-striped lipinia Lipinia quadrivittata (Peters, 1867)
- White-spotted supple skink Lygosoma albopunctatum (Gray, 1846)
- Lygosoma ashwamedhi Sharma, 1969
- Christmas Island grass-skink Lygosoma bowringii (Günther, 1864)
- Lygosoma goaensis (Sharma, 1976)
- Günther's writhing skink Lygosoma guentheri (Günther, 1864)
- Lygosoma lineata (Gray, 1839)
- Lygosoma pruthi (Sharma, 1977)
- Lygosoma punctata (Gmelin, 1799)
- Vosmer's writhing skink Lygosoma vosmaeri (Gray, 1839)
- Gunther's spotted skink Lygosoma guentheri Southwest India
- Mabuya allapallensis Schmidt, 1926
- Mabuya andamanensis Smith, 1935
- Beddome's skink Mabuya beddomii (Jerdon, 1870) Southwest India, Sri Lanka
- Bibron's skink Mabuya bibronii (Gray, 1838) Southeast India, Sri Lanka
- Common keeled skink Mabuya carinata (Schneider, 1801) Pakistan, India, Nepal, Bangladesh
- Inger's mabuya Mabuya clivicola Inger, Shaffer, Koshy & Bakde, 1984
- Striped grass skink Mabuya dissimilis (Hallowell, 1857) Pakistan, North India
- Mabuya gansi Das, 1991
- Blanford's mabuya Mabuya innotata (Blanford, 1870)
- Little Indian skink or bronze skink Mabuya macularia (Blyth, 1853) Bangladesh, India, Nepal, Pakistan, Sri Lanka, Myanmar, Thailand, Vietnam, Malay peninsula
- Many-lined skink Mabuya multifasciata (Kuhl, 1820) Northeast India (Nicobars), China, Malay region
- Nine-keeled skink Mabuya novemcarinata (Anderson, 1871) Northeast India, Myanmar, Malay peninsula
- Four-keeled skink Mabuya quadricarinata Boulenger, 1887 Northeast India, Myanmar
- Rough mabuya Mabuya rudis (Boulenger, 1887)
- Nicobar Island skink Mabuya rugifera (Stoliczka, 1870)
- Three-banded mabuya Mabuya trivittata (Hardwicke & Gray, 1827)
- Tytler's mabuya Mabuya tytleri (Tytler, 1868)
- Gray's snake skink Nessia burtonii Sri Lanka
- Deraniyagala's snake skink Nessia deraniyagalai Sri Lanka
- Two-toed snake skink Nessia didactylus Sri Lanka
- Shark-headed snake skink Nessia hickanala Sri Lanka
- Layard's snake skink Nessia layardi Sri Lanka
- One-toed snake skink Nessia monodactylus Sri Lanka
- Sarasin's snake skink Nessia sarasinorum Sri Lanka
- Eastern sandfish Ophiomorus raithmai Anderson & Leviton, 1966 Pakistan, Northwest India
- Three-toed snake skink Ophiomorus tridactylus (Blyth, 1853)
- Ristella beddomii Boulenger, 1887
- Günther's ristella Ristella guentheri Boulenger, 1887
- Rurk's ristella Ristella rurkii Gray, 1839
- Travancore ristella Ristella travancorica (Beddome, 1870)
- Scincella beddomei (Boulenger, 1887)
- Two-lined ground skink Scincella bilineata (Gray, 1846)
- Ladakh supple skink Scincella ladacensis (Günther, 1864) North India, Nepal
- Scincella macrotis (Steindachner, 1867)
- Scincella palnica (Boettger, 1892)
- Reeves' smooth gecko Scincella reevesii (Gray, 1838)
- Sikkimese supple skink Scincella sikkimensis (Blyth, 1854) Eastern India, Bangladesh, Bhutan, Nepal
- Scincella travancorica (Beddome, 1870)
- Sepsophis punctatus Beddome, 1870
- North Indian litter skink Sphenomorphus indicus (Gray, 1853) Tibet, India (Himalayas), Nepal, Bhutan, Myanmar, Thailand, Indo-China, China, Malay peninsula
- Sphenomorphus courcyanum (Annandale, 1912)
- Dussumier's forest skink Sphenomorphus dussumieri (Duméril & Bibron, 1839)
- Spotted forest skink Sphenomorphus maculatus (Blyth, 1853)

==== Family Lacertidae ====
- Blanford's fringe-fingered lizard Acanthodactylus blanfordii
- Indian fringe-fingered lizard Acanthodactylus cantoris
- Small-spotted lizard Mesalina guttulata
- Beddome's snake-eye Ophisops beddomei
- Snake-eyed lizard Ophisops elegans
- Jerdon's snake-eye Ophisops jerdonii
- Leschenault's snake-eye Ophisops leschenaultii
- Ophisops microlepis
- Deraniyagala's striped lacerta Ophisops minor India, Sri Lanka
- Goalpara grass lizard Takydromus haughtonianus
- Java grass lizard Takydromus khasiensis
- Asian grass lizard Takydromus sexlineatus

==== Family Varanidae ====
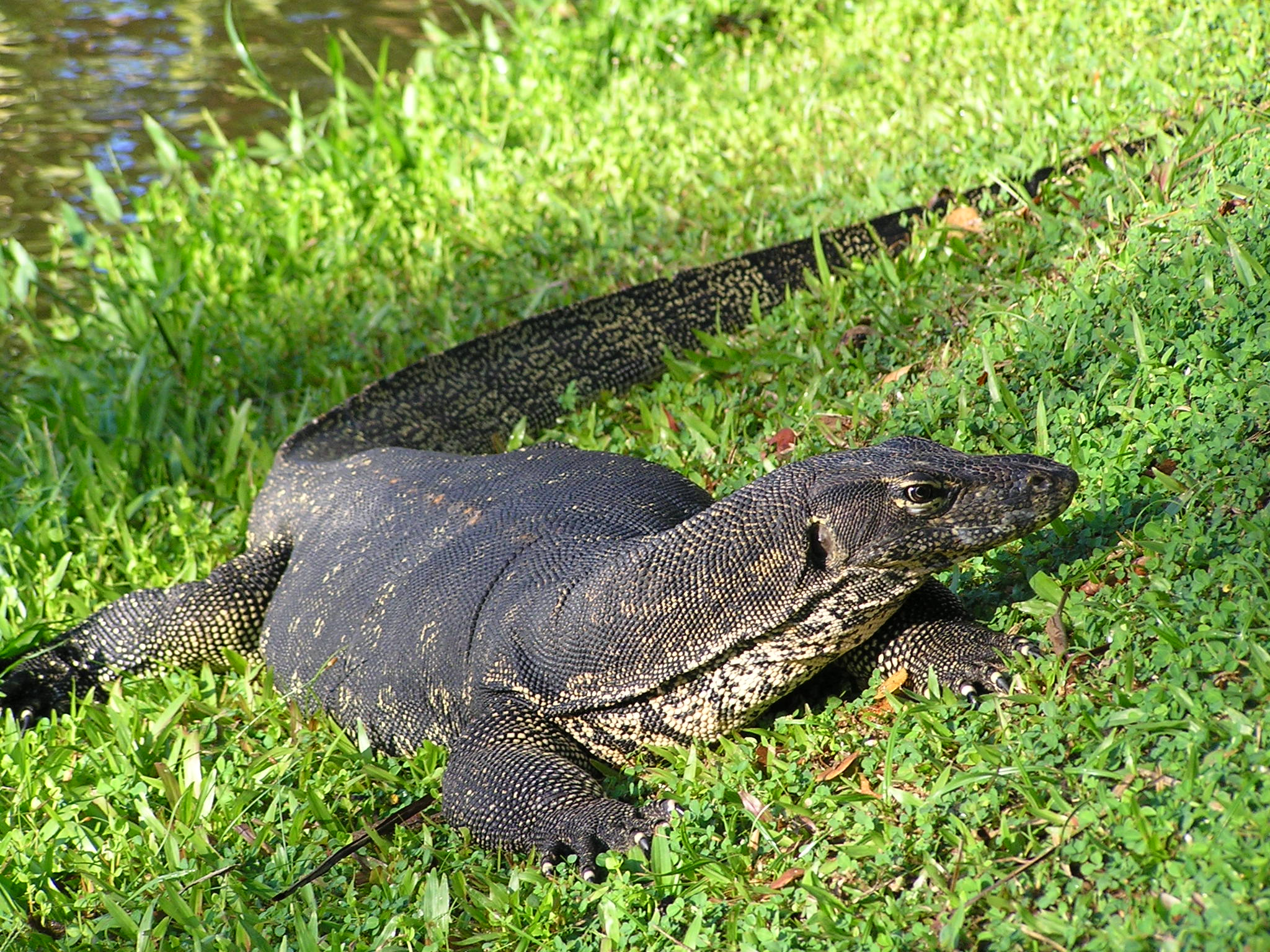
Water monitor (Varanus salvator)

- Bengal monitor (Varanus bengalensis) Iran, Afghanistan, Pakistan, India, Nepal, Bangladesh, Sri Lanka, Myanmar
- Yellow monitor (Varanus flavescens) Pakistan, India, Nepal
- Desert monitor (Varanus griseus) Caspian Sea, Pakistan, Northwest India
- Water monitor (Varanus salvator) India, Sri Lanka, Indo-China, Malay region, Philippines

=== Suborder Sauria ===
==== Family Gymnothalmidae ====
- Vanzosaura rubricauda (Boulenger, 1902)

=== Suborder Serpentes ===
See List of snakes of South Asia

== See also ==
- Wildlife of India
