= Viper gecko =

Viper gecko can refer to:

- Hemidactylus imbricatus, the carrot-tail viper gecko, found in India and Pakistan
- Hemidactylus albofasciatus, the white-striped viper gecko, found in India
