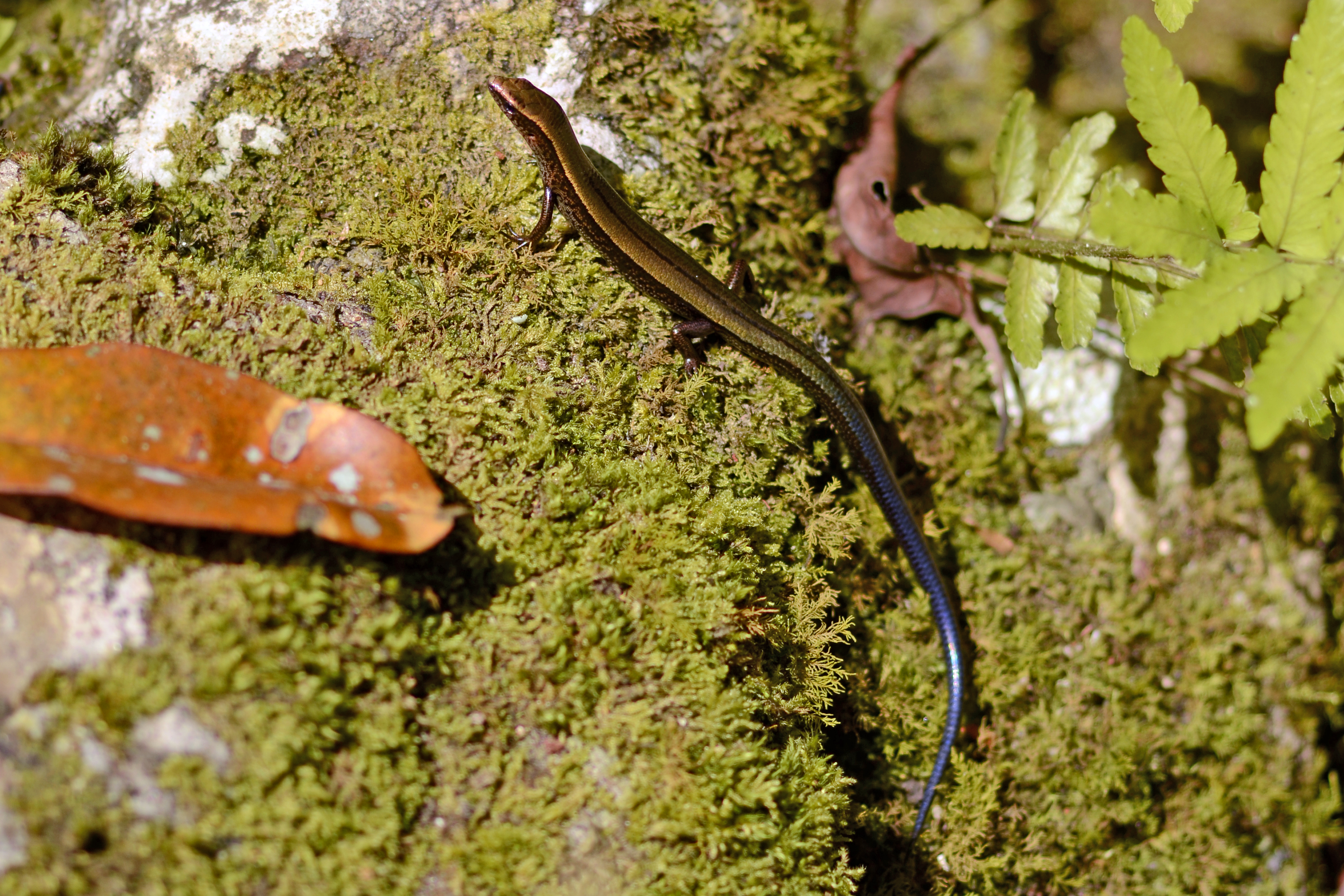
- Kaestlea travancorica

Scientific classification
- Kingdom: Animalia
- Phylum: Chordata
- Class: Reptilia
- Order: Squamata
- Family: Scincidae
- Subfamily: Sphenomorphinae
- Genus: Kaestlea; Eremchenko & Das, 2004

Species
- 5 sp., see text

= Kaestlea =

Genus of lizards

Kaestlea is a genus of skinks. These skinks are small, shiny, smooth-scaled species. They are diurnal, terrestrial and insectivorous. They lay eggs to reproduce. These skinks are identified by their distinct blue tail colour. They live in tropical rainforest and montane forest habitats. These secretive skinks silently move through thick leaf-litter on forest floor. They are all endemic to the Western Ghats mountains and in some parts of Eastern Ghats (Shevaroys) of South India.

== Species ==
The following 5 species, listed alphabetically by specific name, are recognized as being valid:

- Kaestlea beddomii (Boulenger, 1887) - Beddome's ground skink
- Kaestlea bilineata (Gray, 1846) - two-lined ground skink
- Kaestlea laterimaculata (Boulenger, 1887)
- Kaestlea palnica (Boettger, 1892) - Palni Hills ground skink
- Kaestlea travancorica (Beddome, 1870) - Travancore ground skink

Nota bene: A binomial authority in parentheses indicates that the species was originally described in a genus other than Kaestlea.
