= Kaestlea palnica =

Conservation status
- Data Deficient (IUCN 3.1)

Scientific classification
- Kingdom: Animalia
- Phylum: Chordata
- Class: Reptilia
- Order: Squamata
- Suborder: Scinciformata
- Infraorder: Scincomorpha
- Family: Sphenomorphidae
- Genus: Kaestlea
- Species: K. palnica

Binomial name
- Kaestlea palnica (Boettger, 1892)

Species of lizard

The Palni Hills ground skink (Kaestlea palnica) is a species of skink found in India.
