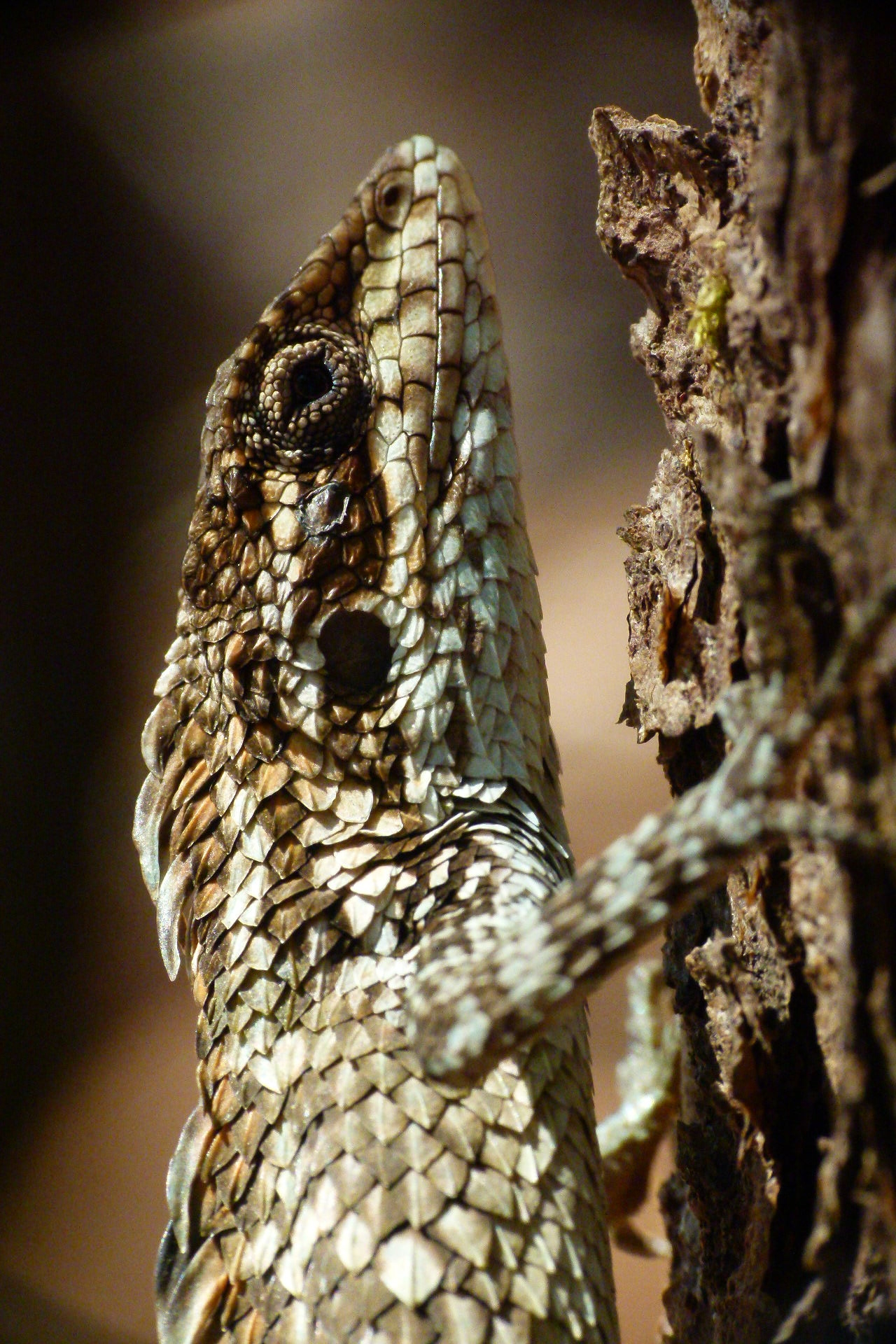
- Side view of the head

Conservation status
- Least Concern (IUCN 3.1)

Scientific classification
- Kingdom: Animalia
- Phylum: Chordata
- Class: Reptilia
- Order: Squamata
- Suborder: Iguania
- Family: Agamidae
- Genus: Salea
- Species: S. horsfieldii

Binomial name
- Salea horsfieldii Gray, 1845
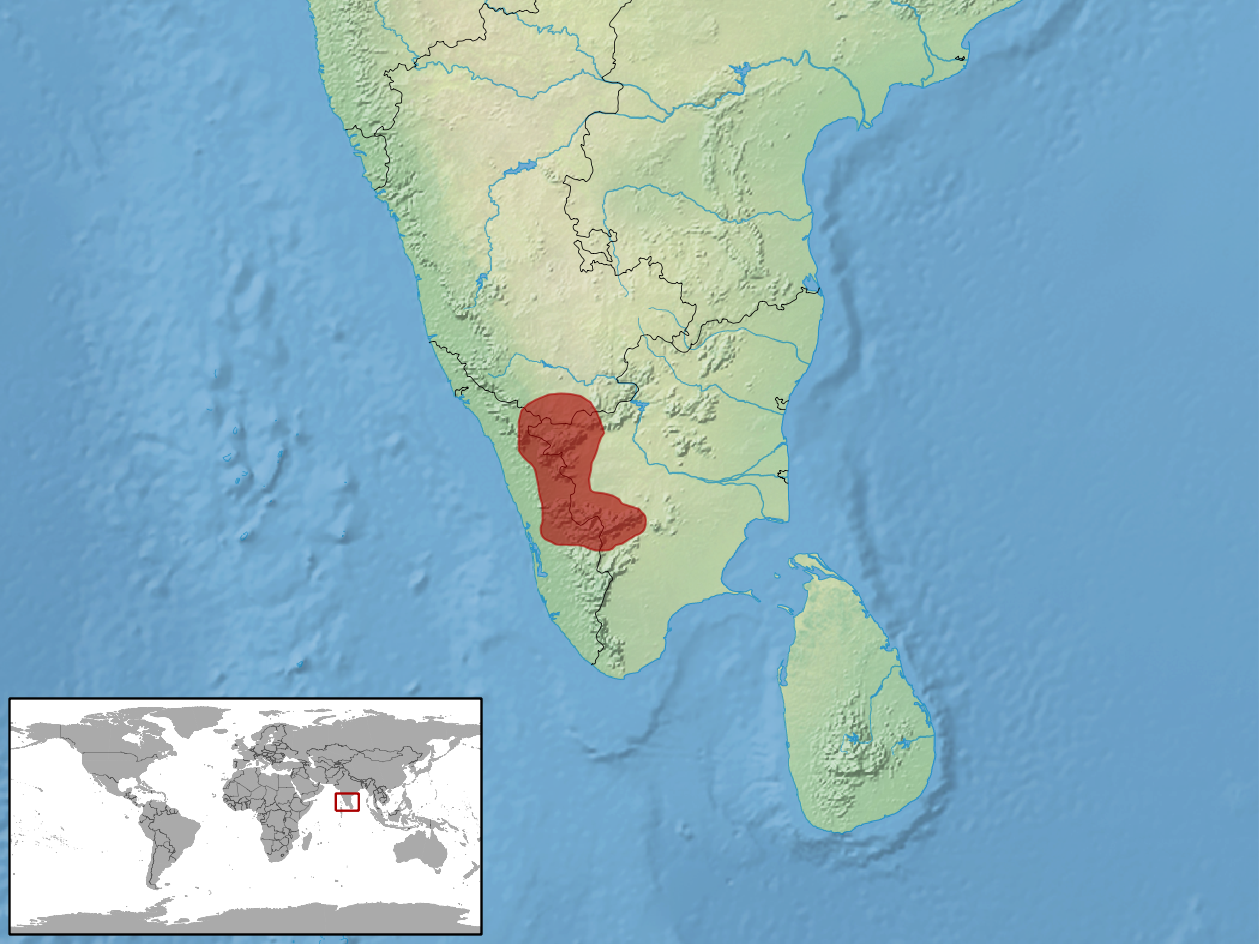

= Salea horsfieldii =

Species of lizard

Salea horsfieldii, commonly known as Horsfield's spiny lizard or the Nilgiri salea, is a species of lizard in the family Agamidae. The species is endemic to the Nilgiri Hills of India.

It is found mainly in the high altitude grassy hills. A related species, Salea anamallayana, is found in the grassy hills of the Anaimalai Hills.

== Etymology ==
The specific name, horsfieldii, is in honor of American naturalist Thomas Horsfield.

== Habitat ==
The preferred natural habitat of S. horsfieldii is forest, at altitudes of 1,600–2,500 m (5,200–8,200 ft).

== Description ==
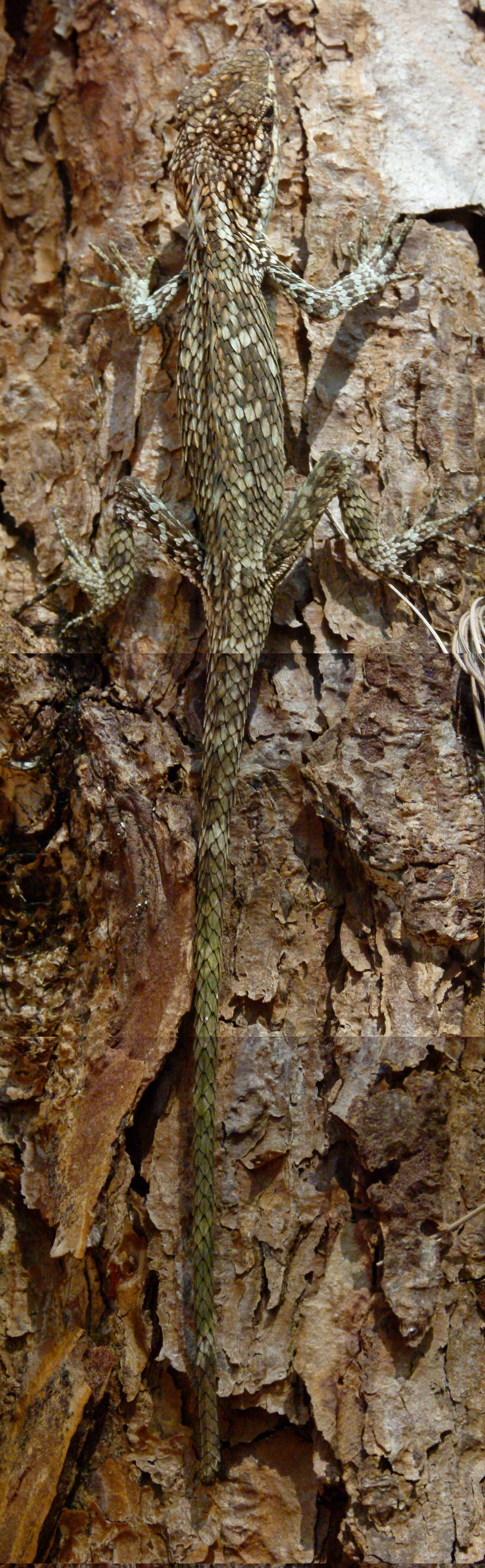
Salea horsfieldii

S. horsfieldii is an olive brown to green lizard, with a white banded appearance. The snout is about 1.5 times as long as the eye diameter which is about twice the diameter of the ear opening. The scales on the head are large and rough. Some scales around the brow above the eye are curved. A row of three or four large scales is found between the eye and the ear opening. The scales on the throat are lanceolate, keeled and sharp tipped. The male has a crest on the back of the neck made up of a few lanceolate spines facing backwards. The dorsal crest continues after a break behind the nuchal crest. The scales on the upper surface are large, rhomboidal, strongly keeled, pointing straight backwards; these are nearly always of unequal size, larger ones being scattered on the sides. The ventral scales are very strongly imbricate, strongly keeled and ending in a spine, nearly as large as the dorsals. The limbs are somewhat long, and when the hind limb is held along the body, the toes reach between the shoulder and ear opening. The tail, which is compressed, has a small crest in the male, but is crestless in the female. The caudal scales are sub-equal and strongly keeled.

The colour is pale olive above but varies from green to brown, with irregular dark-brown cross bands, often broken up by a band of light-brown colour running along the sides of the back. The larger scales on the sides are frequently white, and a blackish band edged below in white extends from the eye, through the tympanum, to the foreleg. The tail is banded with regular dark brown and creamy bands. The length from snout to vent (SVL) is about 3.75 inches (9.5 cm) and the tail measures 9.75 inches (24.8 cm).

== Reproduction ==
S. horsfieldii is oviparous.
