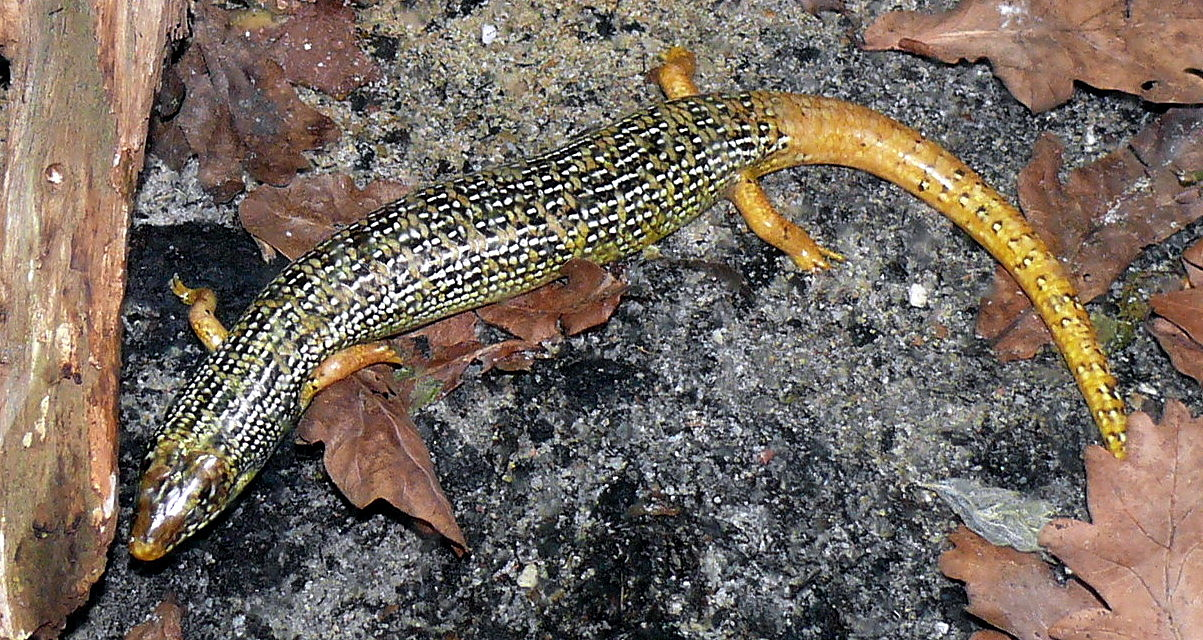
- Eurylepis taeniolata

Scientific classification
- Domain: Eukaryota
- Kingdom: Animalia
- Phylum: Chordata
- Class: Reptilia
- Order: Squamata
- Family: Scincidae
- Subfamily: Scincinae
- Genus: Eurylepis; Blyth, 1854

= Eurylepis =

Genus of lizards

Eurylepis is a genus of skinks found in Asia.

== Species ==
There are two species:

- Eurylepis poonaensis – Poona skink
- Eurylepis taeniolata ribbon-sided skink, alpine Punjab skink, yellow-bellied mole skink
