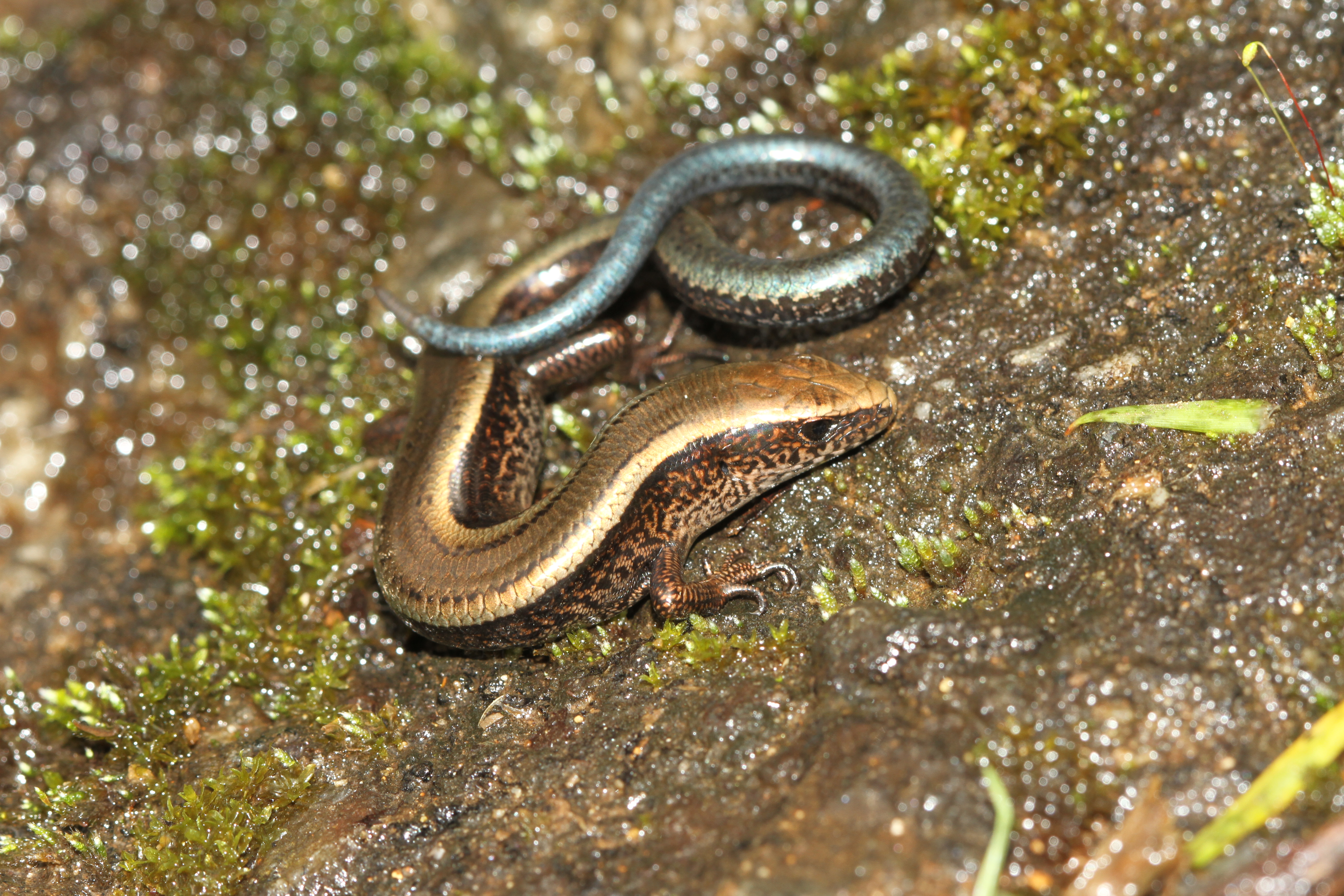

Conservation status
- Vulnerable (IUCN 3.1)

Scientific classification
- Kingdom: Animalia
- Phylum: Chordata
- Class: Reptilia
- Order: Squamata
- Suborder: Scinciformata
- Infraorder: Scincomorpha
- Family: Sphenomorphidae
- Genus: Kaestlea
- Species: K. laterimaculata

Binomial name
- Kaestlea laterimaculata (Boulenger, 1887)

= Kaestlea laterimaculata =

Species of lizard

Kaestlea laterimaculata is a species of skink found in India.
