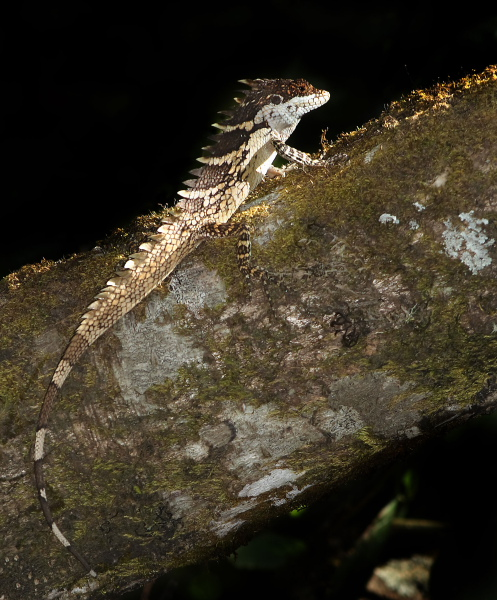
- Salea anamallayana

Scientific classification
- Kingdom: Animalia
- Phylum: Chordata
- Class: Reptilia
- Order: Squamata
- Suborder: Iguania
- Family: Agamidae
- Subfamily: Draconinae
- Genus: Salea; Gray, 1845

Diversity
- 2 species (see text)

= Salea =

Genus of lizards

Salea is a genus of arboreal, slow-moving, diurnal, insectivorous, egg-laying agamid lizards endemic to the Western Ghats of South India. It has two species, each inhabiting very high mountainous tracts of the Western Ghats in the Shola forest ecosystems.

== Description ==
Albert Günther, in his treatise "The Reptiles of British India", described Salea as follows:

The tympanum naked. Back and sides covered with strongly keeled scales of moderate size; several larger scales are intermixed with the others on the side; the scales form longitudinal series, and their tips arc directed backwards; bead without any spines. A crest on the back; gular sac: none. Tail slightly compressed at the base, with keeled scales below, which arc almost as broad as long. The head is tetrahedral, covered with small irregular shields above, which are nearly as large as the labials. Nostrils lateral, in the hinder part of a small shield. Canthus rostralis is very distinct; superciliary edge not prominent; eye of moderate size; tympanum as large as the eye. The trunk is slightly compressed, and covered with scales of moderate size which are sharply keeled and acutely pointed, the keels forming continuous longitudinal lines; the ventral and gular scales are similar in shape and size to those on the sides. There arc three larger scales, separate from one another, and placed in the same longitudinal line somewhat below the middle of the sides. Throat without pouch or fold; dorsal crest more or less developed. Tail long, tapering, slightly compressed at the base, uniformly covered with rhombic keeled scales, those at its lower side having very strong keels. The limbs are well developed; the fourth hind toe is not much longer than the third.

== Species ==
There are only two confirmed species of Salea.

Image	Scientific name	Common name	Distribution
	Salea anamallayana (Beddome, 1878)	Anaimalai spiny lizard	Upper Palni Hills and Anaimalai.
	Salea horsfieldii Gray, 1845	Horsfield's spiny lizard	Upper Nilgiri Hills.

The Palakkad Gap is believed to have played a significant role in causing speciation of these lizards on these mountain tops.

A doubtful 'third' taxon Salea gularis is often associated with this genus.
