= Eurylepis poonaensis =

Conservation status
- Endangered (IUCN 3.1)

Scientific classification
- Domain: Eukaryota
- Kingdom: Animalia
- Phylum: Chordata
- Class: Reptilia
- Order: Squamata
- Family: Scincidae
- Genus: Eurylepis
- Species: E. poonaensis

Binomial name
- Eurylepis poonaensis (Sharma, 1970)

Synonyms
- Eumeces poonaensis

Species of lizard

Eurylepis poonaensis, the Poona skink, is a species of skink found only in Maharashtra, India.
