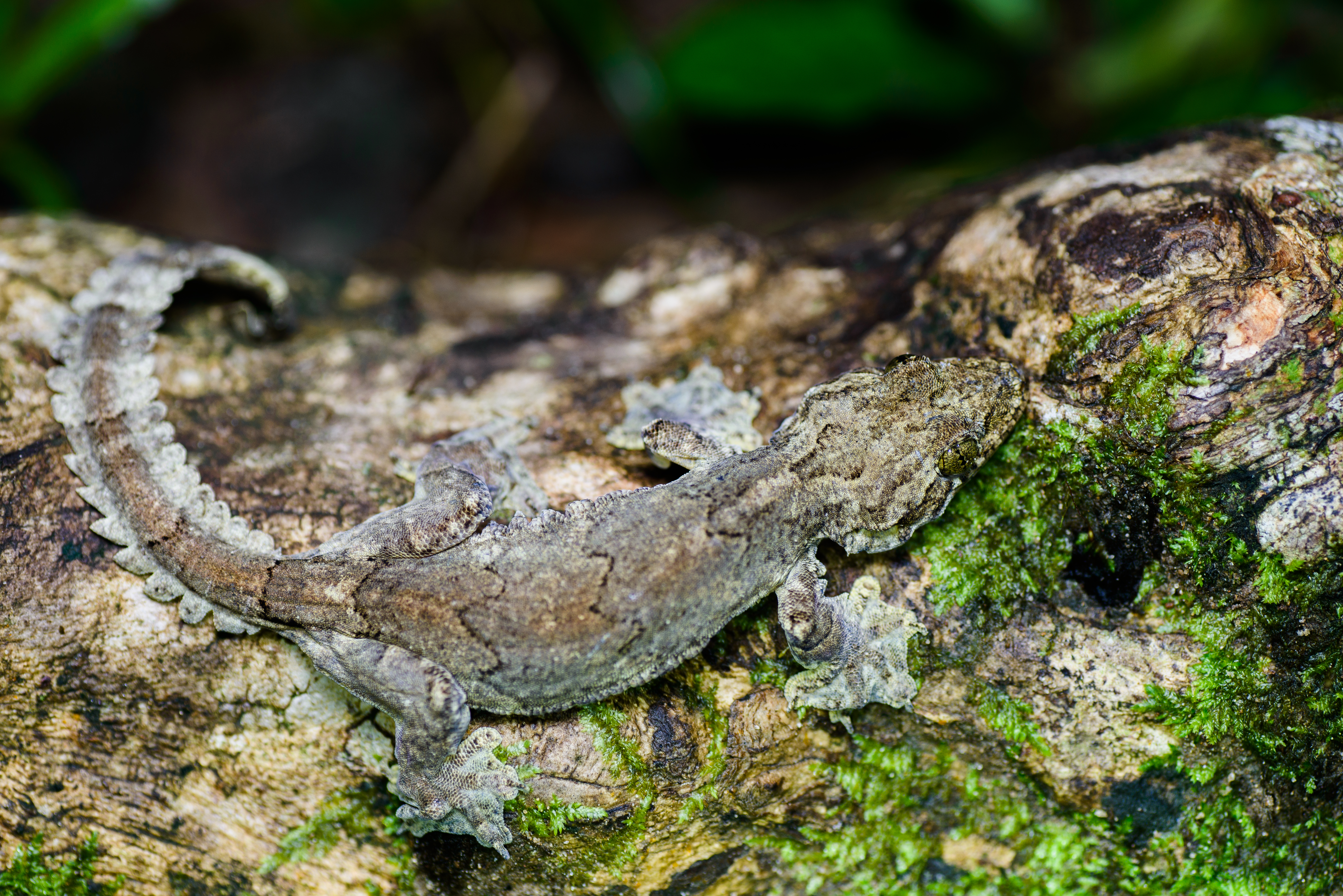

Conservation status
- Least Concern (IUCN 3.1)

Scientific classification
- Kingdom: Animalia
- Phylum: Chordata
- Class: Reptilia
- Order: Squamata
- Suborder: Gekkota
- Family: Gekkonidae
- Genus: Gekko
- Species: G. lionotum

Binomial name
- Gekko lionotum (Annandale, 1905)
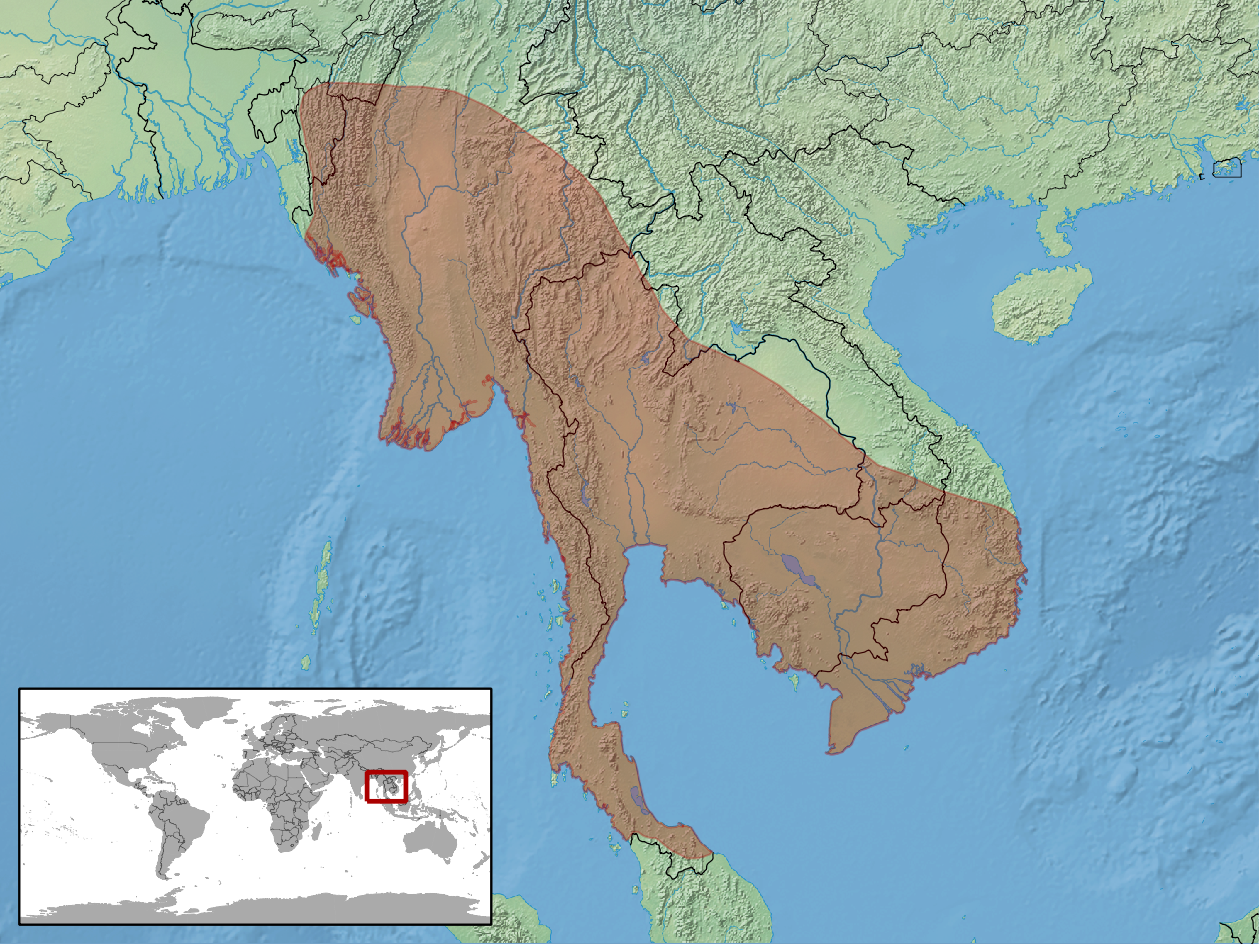

Synonyms
- Ptychozoon homalocephalum var. lionotum; Ptychozoon lionotum

= Gekko lionotum =

Species of lizard

Gekko lionotum, commonly known as smooth-backed gliding gecko or Burmese flying gecko, is a species of gecko found in Southeast Asia.

== Distribution ==
It is found in southern Myanmar, Thailand (Ramri, Phang Nga Province, Bangnon, Ranong Province), Pegu, Western Malaysia, Johor: Pulau Sibu; India and Bangladesh. The type locality is from Pegu, Myanmar.
