= Anderson's mabuya =

Conservation status
- Least Concern (IUCN 3.1)

Scientific classification
- Kingdom: Animalia
- Phylum: Chordata
- Class: Reptilia
- Order: Squamata
- Family: Scincidae
- Genus: Toenayar; Karin, Metallinou, Weinell, Jackman, & Bauer, 2016
- Species: T. novemcarinata

Binomial name
- Toenayar novemcarinata (Anderson, 1871)
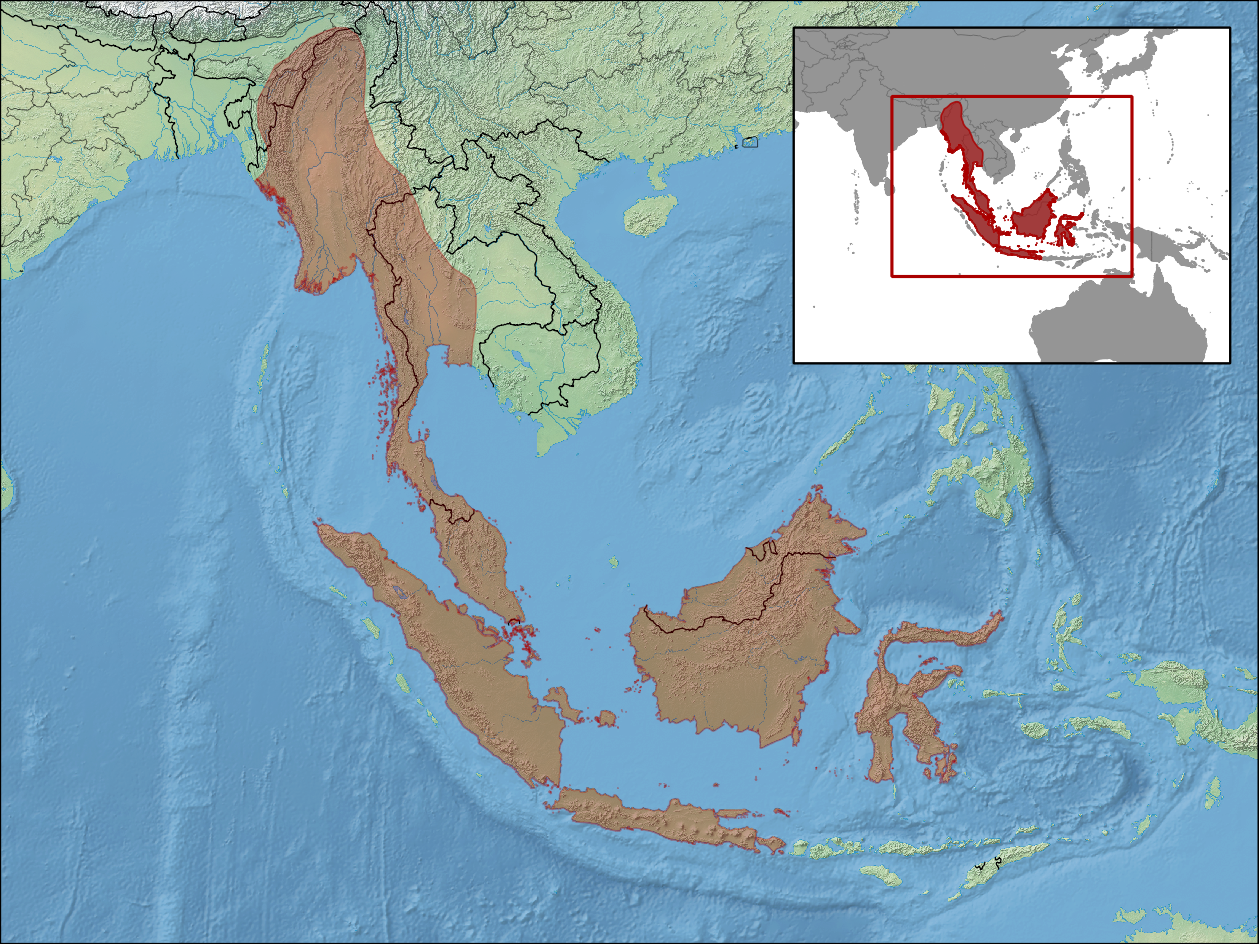

Synonyms
- Eutropis novemcarinata (Anderson, 1871); Euprepes novemcarinata Anderson, 1871; Mabuya novemcarinata (Anderson, 1871)

Species of lizard

Anderson's mabuya or nine-keeled sun skink (Toenayar novemcarinata) is a species of skink found in Asia. It is monotypic in the genus Toenayar.

== Distribution ==
Found in the Sunda Islands, India, Thailand and Myanmar.
