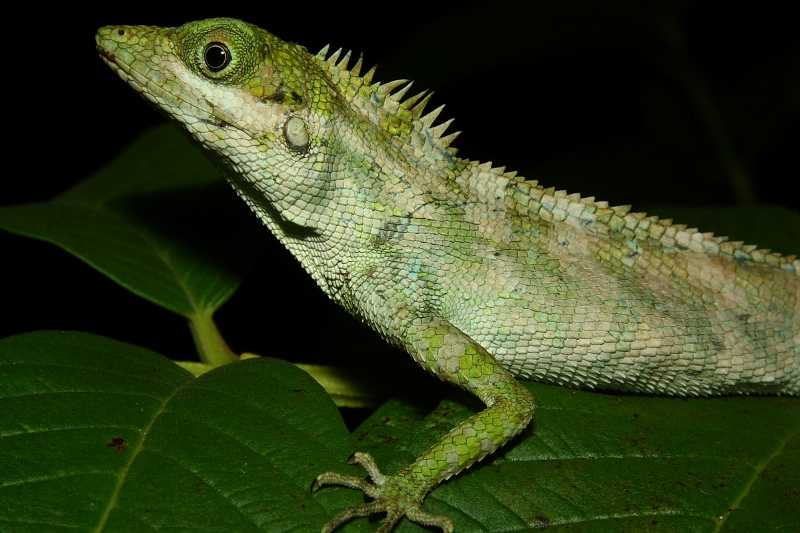
- Male

Scientific classification
- Kingdom: Animalia
- Phylum: Chordata
- Class: Reptilia
- Order: Squamata
- Suborder: Iguania
- Family: Agamidae
- Genus: Pseudocalotes
- Species: P. andamanensis

Binomial name
- Pseudocalotes andamanensis (Boulenger, 1891)

Synonyms
- Calotes andamanensis Boulenger, 1891

= Pseudocalotes andamanensis =

Species of lizard

Pseudocalotes andamanensis is an agamid lizard found on the Nicobar Islands and the Andaman Islands in India. It is also known as the green crestless forest lizard, Andaman and Nicobar forest lizard, Andaman lizard, or Andaman green calotes. This species is an almost exclusive canopy dweller, and is rarely seen.

The holotype of Pseudocalotes andamanensis is an adult male from the Andaman Islands collected by Frederick Adolph de Roepstorff in 1882. It was recently rediscovered in the Andaman Islands.

== Taxonomy ==
This species formerly included Microauris aurantolabium from southern India, now reclassified as a distinct species.
