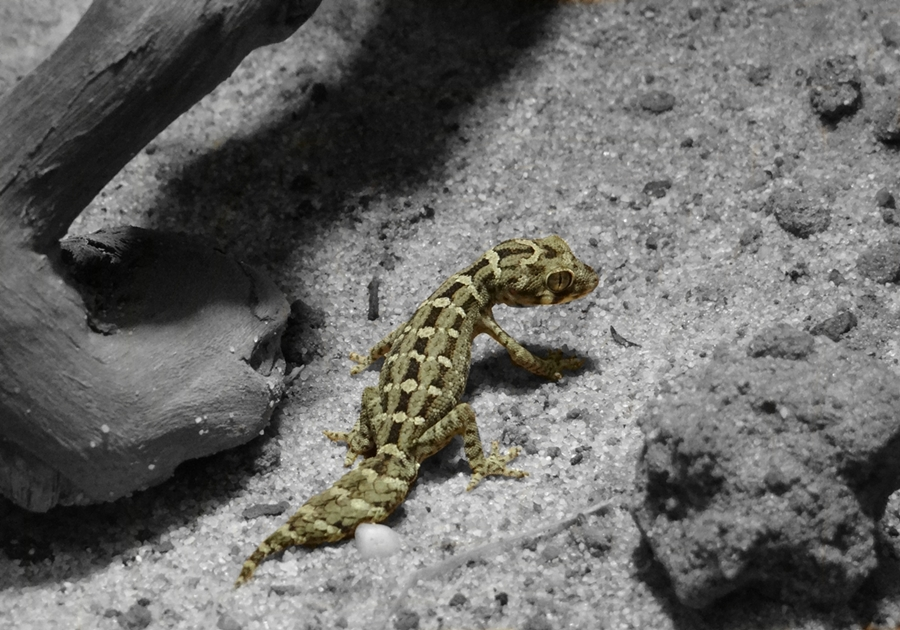

Conservation status
- Least Concern (IUCN 3.1)

Scientific classification
- Kingdom: Animalia
- Phylum: Chordata
- Order: Squamata
- Suborder: Gekkota
- Family: Gekkonidae
- Genus: Hemidactylus
- Species: H. imbricatus

Binomial name
- Hemidactylus imbricatus (Bauer, Giri, Greenbaum, Jackman, Dharne, and Schouche, 2008)
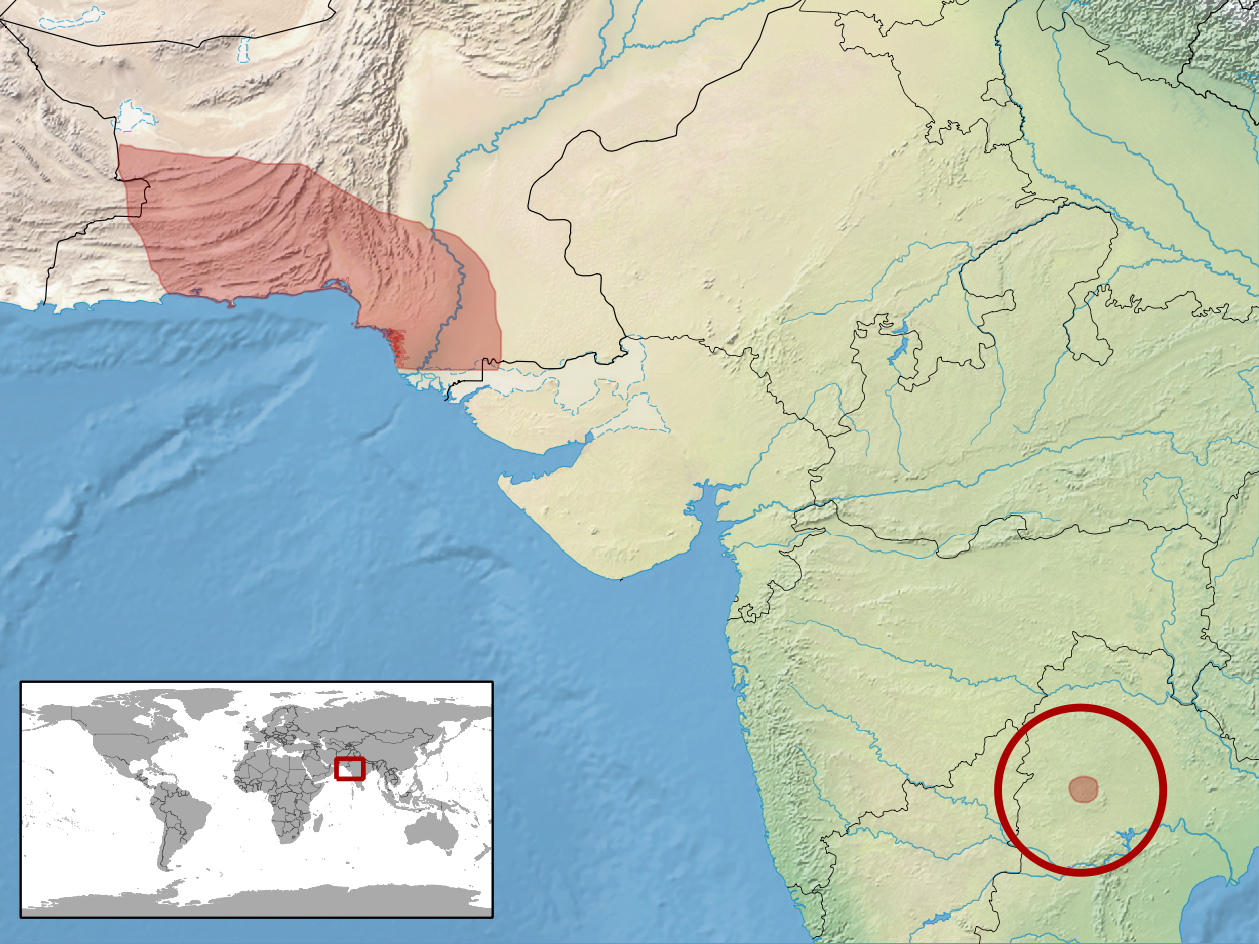

Synonyms
- Homonota fasciata Jerdon, 1854; Teratolepis fasciata – Günther, 1869

= Carrot-tail viper gecko =

Species of lizard

The carrot-tail viper gecko (Hemidactylus imbricatus) is a species of gecko. It is found in Iran, Pakistan and possibly India, although the Indian records are questionable.

== Taxonomy ==
This species was formerly known as Teratolepis fasciata, but after Teratolepis was brought to synonymy with Hemidactylus, this species would have become a junior secondary homonym of Hemidactylus fasciatus Gray 1842. Thus a nomen novum was needed.

== Description ==
Body somewhat depressed; limbs rather long and slender. Head covered with polygonal flat scales. Seven lower labials; mental large, triangular; two larger anterior chin-shields, in contact behind the mental, followed by others passing gradually into the small gular granules. Dorsal scales large, lozenge-shaped, slightly keeled; ventral scales much smaller, smooth. Tail depressed, swollen, tapering at the end, covered with imbricate irregular scales, some of those of the upper surface being extremely large. Greyish above, with five brown longitudinal bands, which at regular intervals are interrupted by white spots forming cross bands; seven of these cross bands on the neck and trunk.

The head and body are 1.5 inches (38 mm) in length. The species has been noted from Jalna in the Deccan according to Boulenger, but this may refer to the white-striped viper gecko.
