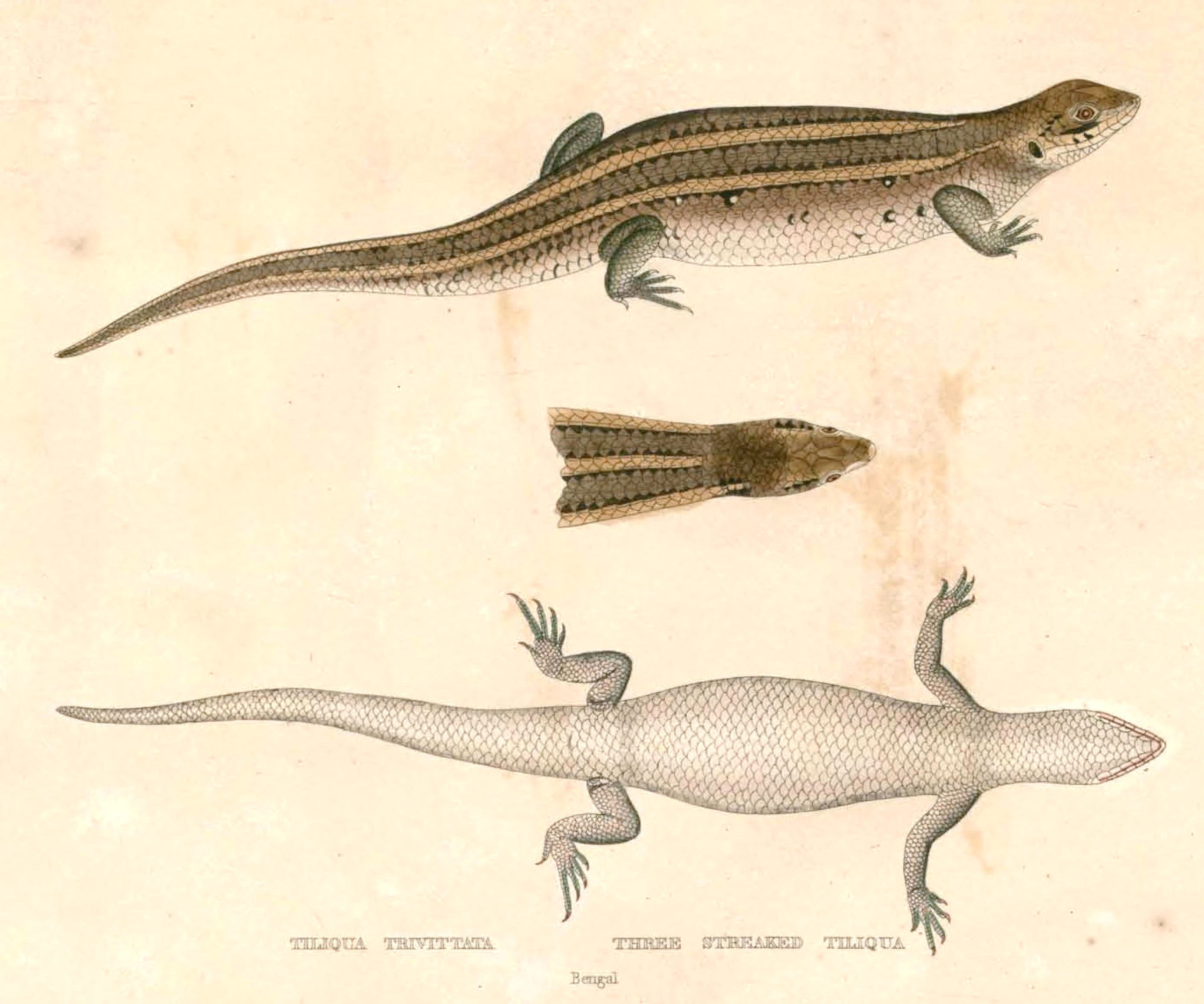

Conservation status
- Least Concern (IUCN 3.1)

Scientific classification
- Kingdom: Animalia
- Phylum: Chordata
- Class: Reptilia
- Order: Squamata
- Suborder: Scinciformata
- Infraorder: Scincomorpha
- Family: Mabuyidae
- Genus: Eutropis
- Species: E. trivittata

Binomial name
- Eutropis trivittata (Hardwicke & Gray, 1827)

Synonyms
- Mabuya trivittata (Hardwicke & Gray, 1827)

= Eutropis trivittata =

Species of lizard

Eutropis trivittata (Indian three-banded skink) is a species of skink found in India.

== Description ==
Supranasals in contact with one another; fronto-nasal broader than long; prefrontantal in contact with one another; a pair of nuchal present or absent. No postnasal, anterior loreal higher than long. Half as long as the posterior; lower eyelid scaly; ear opening subcircular, smaller than a lateral scale with a short, pointed lobulous anteriorly. Dorsal and lateral scales subequal, with 5, sometime in adults 7, strong keels; 34 or 36 scales round the middle of the body. Digits moderately long, with smooth lamellae, 13 or 14 beneath the fourth toe; the hind-limb reaches to the wrist or the elbow. Palm of the heel and sole of the feet with enlarged sub conical tubercles intermixed with much smaller one.

== Distribution ==
Central and western India (Bombay, Madras, Hyderabad, Madhya Pradesh, Bihar).
