= Kaestlea travancorica =

Conservation status
- Least Concern (IUCN 3.1)

Scientific classification
- Kingdom: Animalia
- Phylum: Chordata
- Class: Reptilia
- Order: Squamata
- Family: Scincidae
- Genus: Kaestlea
- Species: K. travancorica

Binomial name
- Kaestlea travancorica (Beddome, 1870)

Synonyms
- Mocoa travancorica Beddome,1870; Lygosoma travancoricum (Beddome,1870); Scincella travancorica (Beddome,1870)

Species of lizard

Kaestlea travancorica, also known as the Travancore ground skink or Barbour's ground skink, is a species of skink endemic to southern Western Ghats.

== Description ==
A medium-sized (3.8 cm), blue-tailed forest skink. Earlier placed in the genus Scincella, it is now included in the genus Kaestlea. It is diurnal and known to feed on insects on the forest floor.

== Distribution ==
Restricted to the Western Ghats, India. Mainly known from Travancore regions of Tamil Nadu and Kerala states. Studies conducted in Kalakkad Mundanthurai Tiger Reserve show that this species occurs mainly in high-altitude rain forest habitat at elevations between 1,000–1,700 m (3,300–5,600 ft) above sea level.

== Notes ==
- Ouboter, P.E. 1986 A revision of the genus Scincella (Reptilia: Sauria: Scincidae) of Asia, with some notes on its evolution. Zoologische Verhandelingen (Leiden) (No. 229) 1986: 1-66 PDF
- Smith, M.A. 1937 A review of the genus Lygosoma (Scincida Reptilia) and its allies. Rec. Ind. Mus. 39 (3): 213-234
