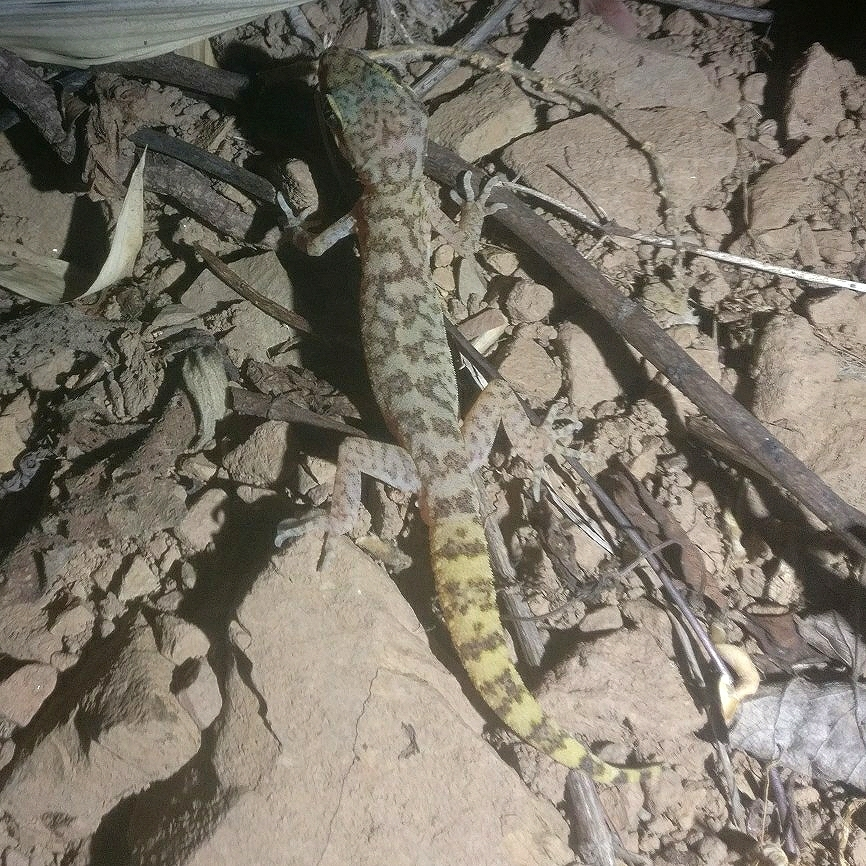

Conservation status
- Data Deficient (IUCN 3.1)

Scientific classification
- Kingdom: Animalia
- Phylum: Chordata
- Class: Reptilia
- Order: Squamata
- Suborder: Gekkota
- Family: Gekkonidae
- Genus: Cyrtodactylus
- Species: C. lawderanus

Binomial name
- Cyrtodactylus lawderanus (Stoliczka, 1871)

Synonyms
- Gymnodactylus lawderanus Stoliczka, 1871; Alsophylax himalayensis Annandale, 1913; Cyrtodactylus lawderanus — Underwood, 1954; Gonydactylus lawderanus — Kluge, 1991; Cyrtopodion lawderanus — Rösler, 2000; Siwaligekko lawderanus — Khan, 2003; Cyrtopodion lawderanum — Frost, 2007; Cyrtodactylus lawderanum — Agarwal et al., 2014

= Lawder's bent-toed gecko =

Lawder's bent-toed Gecko

Species of lizard

Lawder's bent-toed gecko (Cyrtodactylus lawderanus) is a species of gecko, a lizard in the family Gekkonidae. The species is endemic to northern India (western Himalayas, Kumaon). Its type locality is "Kumaon", restricted to Almora by Malcolm Arthur Smith. It is named after Mr. A. Lawder who collected the holotype. His identity is not known for sure, but he is likely to have been A.W. Lawder who was a member of the Geological Society of London, as was Ferdinand Stoliczka who described the species. It is sometimes placed in the genus Cyrtopodion.

== Description ==
The body of C. lawderanus is rather slender and elongate, depressed, and covered above with numerous granules intermixed with small roundish tubercles. The upper side of the head is equally granular, with the granular scales being somewhat larger on the snout. The rostral is large, and broad, with the nostril pierced between the rostral, the first labial, and two nasals. It has 9 upper and 8 lower labials. The mental is triangular, partially wedged in between two elongate chin-shields, forming a suture below it. Each of the chin-shields is followed along the labials by three other somewhat rounded shields. The ear-opening is small and rounded. The ventral scales are small. Two pairs of preanal pores occur in the male, are close together, and form an angle. The general colour above is greyish brown, very densely marbled and spotted with dark brown, with some indistinct undulating, whitish cross bands on the body, and margined on the anterior edges with blackish brown. A somewhat indistinct dark band runs from the nostril through the eye to the ear. The front and hind edges of the eye are white. The labials are spotted and speckled with brown. The underside of the body is whitish. The length of the body is nearly 2 inches.

== Reproduction ==
C. lawderanus is oviparous.
