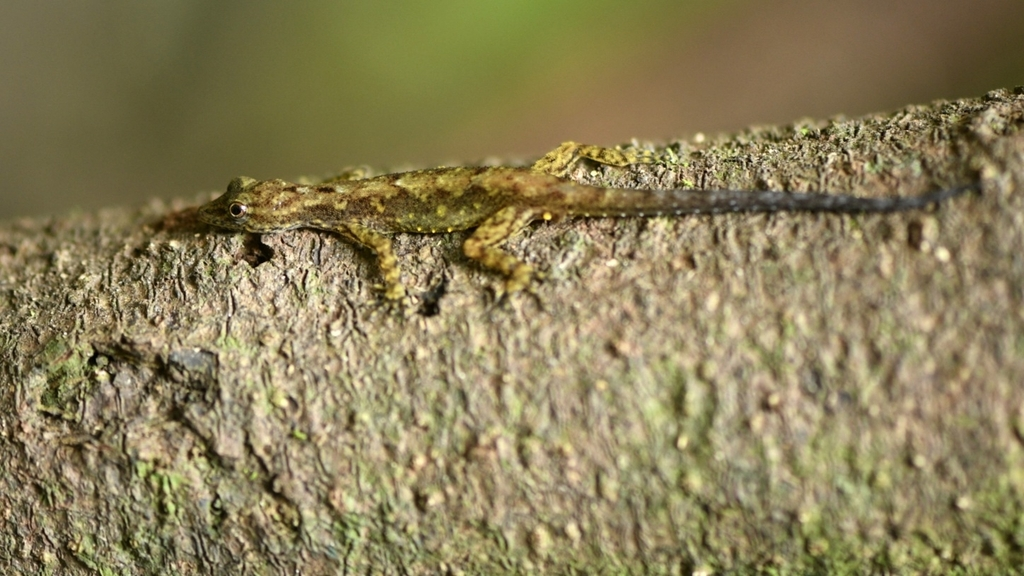

Conservation status
- Endangered (IUCN 3.1)

Scientific classification
- Kingdom: Animalia
- Phylum: Chordata
- Class: Reptilia
- Order: Squamata
- Suborder: Gekkota
- Family: Gekkonidae
- Genus: Cnemaspis
- Species: C. goaensis

Binomial name
- Cnemaspis goaensis Sharma, 1976

Synonyms
- Cnemaspis indraneildasii Bauer, 2002

= Goan day gecko =

Species of lizard

The Goan day gecko (Cnemaspis goaensis) is a species of lizard in the family Gekkonidae. The species is native to southwestern India.

== Geographic range ==
C. goaensis is found in the Indian states of Goa and Karnatka.

== Reproduction ==
C. goaensis is oviparous.
