= Microauris =

Conservation status
- Endangered (IUCN 3.1)

Scientific classification
- Kingdom: Animalia
- Phylum: Chordata
- Class: Reptilia
- Order: Squamata
- Suborder: Iguania
- Family: Agamidae
- Genus: Microauris; Pal et al, 2018
- Species: M. aurantolabium

Binomial name
- Microauris aurantolabium (Krishnan, 2008)

Synonyms
- Calotes aurantolabium Krishnan, 2008

Genus of lizards

Microauris is a monotypic genus of agamid lizard. Its only species is Microauris aurantolabium, also known as the small-eared dragon or orange-lipped forest lizard, found in the forests of the southern Western Ghats and is currently known from the Kalakkad Mundanthurai Tiger Reserve. The species was formerly included in Pseudocalotes andamanensis of the Andaman Islands, but recognized as distinct in 2008. It was also classified under Calotes until 2018, where it was transferred to its own genus, Microauris, on the basis of its divergence from Calotes.

== Description ==
This species is diagnosed by having orange colored upper lips, green body; acutely keeled scales over body (dorsally and ventrally), head, and throat; postero-ventral orientation of the dorsal scales; antehumeral pit absent; 63 scales around midbody; small tympanum (5.5% HL); toe III and IV subequal. Distinguished from Pseudocalotes andamanensis in having acutely keeled dorsals, all of which are directed posteroventrally; antehumeral pit absent; acutely keeled ventrals, limb and head scales; smaller occipital, nuchal, temporal regions. Distinguished from all known species of the Calotes versicolor group in having posteroventral orientation of dorsal scales (posterodorsal in C. versicolor group). Distinguished from species of the Calotes liocephalus group in lacking antehumeral pit, and in having a proportionately smaller head, ulnar length proportionately longer, tibial length proportionately shorter. Distinguished from Monilesaurus rouxii and Monilesaurus ellioti in lacking an antehumeral fold and spines, toe-IV and III subequal.

The species was eventually moved to its own genus, Microauris, on the basis of its extremely small tympanum, making it different from members of Calotes.

Holotype: Bombay Natural History Society (BNHS) 1436 (Orange-lipped forest lizard) an adult female, collected by N. M. Ishwar at Kakkachi in Kalakkad Mundanthurai Tiger Reserve, Tamil Nadu, India in 1997.
