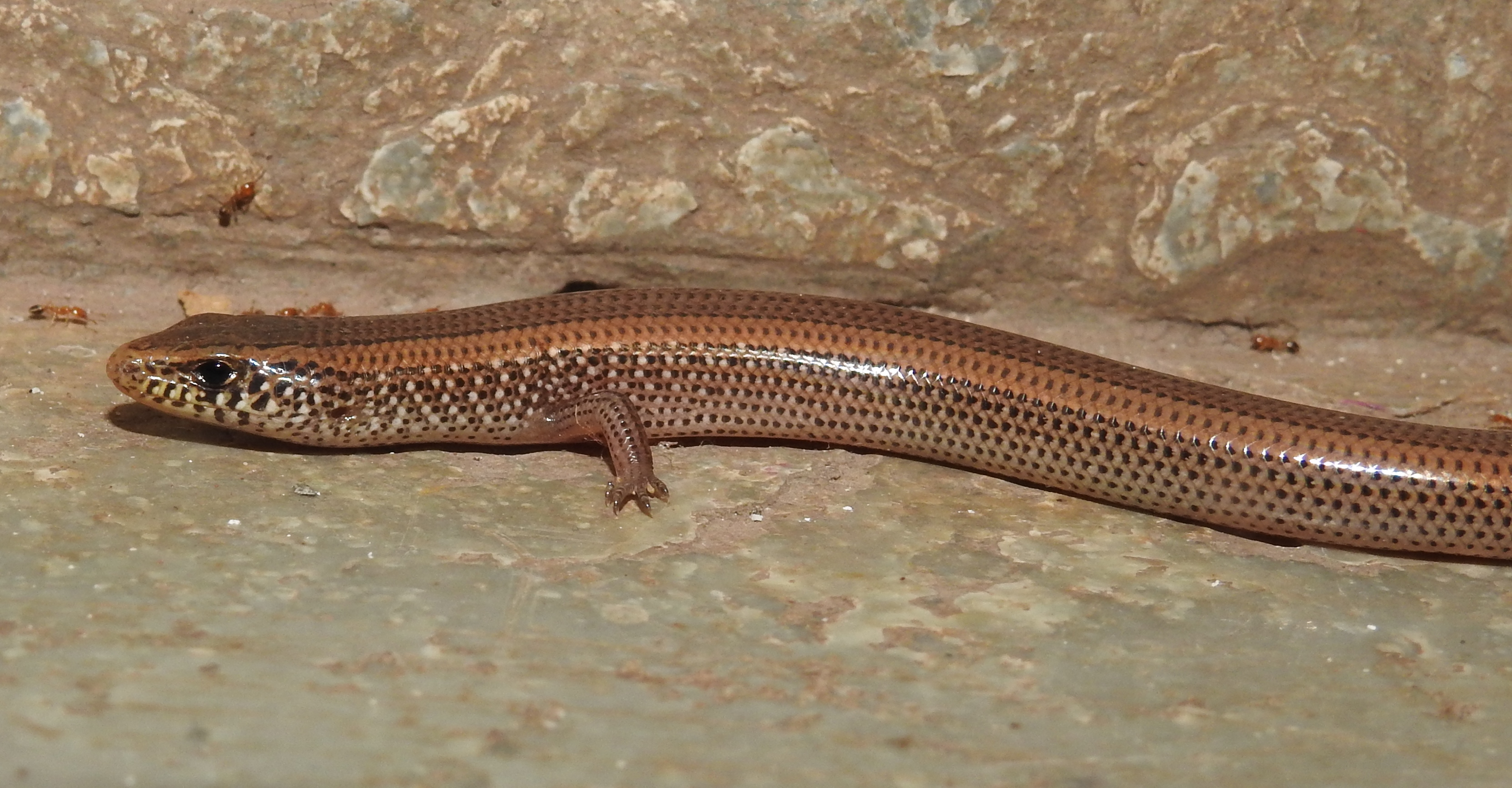

Conservation status
- Least Concern (IUCN 3.1)

Scientific classification
- Kingdom: Animalia
- Phylum: Chordata
- Class: Reptilia
- Order: Squamata
- Family: Scincidae
- Genus: Riopa
- Species: R. guentheri

Binomial name
- Riopa guentheri (W. Peters, 1879)

Synonyms
- Eumeces punctatus Günther, 1864 (nomen nudum); Eumeces Güntheri W. Peters, 1879 (nomen substitutum); Lygosoma guentheri — Boulenger, 1887; Riopa guentheri — M.A. Smith, 1935; Lygosoma guentheri — Das, 1996; Riopa guentheri — Freitas et al., 2019

= Riopa guentheri =

Species of lizard

Riopa guentheri, commonly known as Günther's supple skink and Günther's writhing skink, is a species of lizard in the family Scincidae. The species is endemic to India.

== Etymology ==
The specific name, guentheri, is in honor of German-born British herpetologist Albert Günther.

== Geographic range ==
R. guentheri has been known to occur in localities of erstwhile Bombay Presidency such as Matheran, Sholapur, Kurduwadi, Belgaum, and Uttara Kannada.

== Habitat ==
The preferred natural habitat of R. guentheri is forest, at altitudes of 50–1,800 m (160–5,910 ft).

== Diet ==
R. guentheri preys upon ants, termites, and other insects.

== Reproduction ==
The mode of reproduction of R. guentheri is unknown.
