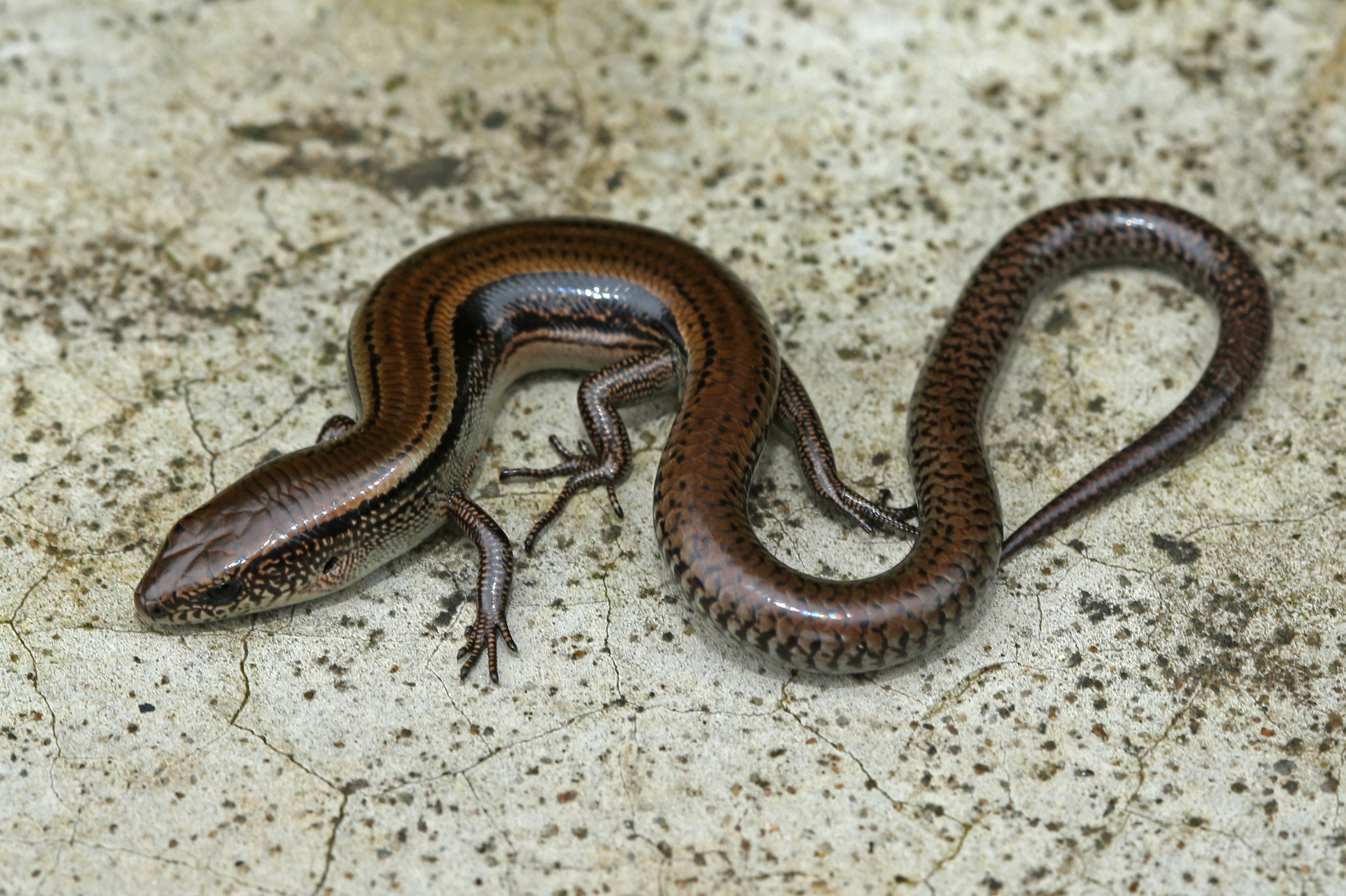

Conservation status
- Least Concern (IUCN 3.1)

Scientific classification
- Kingdom: Animalia
- Phylum: Chordata
- Class: Reptilia
- Order: Squamata
- Suborder: Scinciformata
- Infraorder: Scincomorpha
- Family: Sphenomorphidae
- Genus: Kaestlea
- Species: K. bilineata

Binomial name
- Kaestlea bilineata (Gray, 1846)

Synonyms
- Mocoa bilineata; Eumeces bilineatus; Lygosoma bilineatum; Leiolopisma bilineatum; Scincella bilineata; Scincella bilineatum

= Two-lined ground skink =

Species of reptile

The two-lined ground skink (Kaestlea bilineata) is a species of skink. It is found in the Nilgiri Hills and Travancore Hills of India.
