= Scincella palnica =

Scientific classification
- Kingdom: Animalia
- Phylum: Chordata
- Class: Reptilia
- Order: Squamata
- Family: Scincidae
- Genus: Scincella
- Species: S. palnica

Binomial name
- Scincella palnica (Boettger, 1892)

Species of lizard

Scincella palnica is a species of skink found in India (Travancore, Anaimalai, Palni Hills, Coimbatore, and Madras Presidency).
