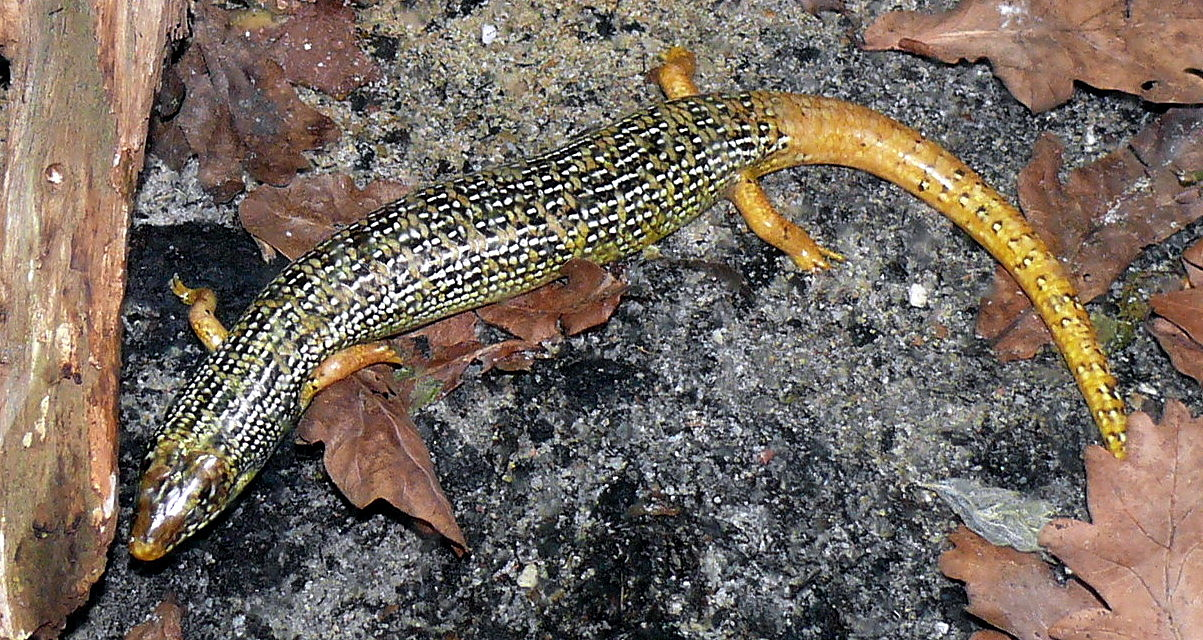

Conservation status
- Least Concern (IUCN 3.1)

Scientific classification
- Kingdom: Animalia
- Phylum: Chordata
- Class: Reptilia
- Order: Squamata
- Family: Scincidae
- Genus: Eurylepis
- Species: E. taeniolata

Binomial name
- Eurylepis taeniolata Blyth, 1854

Synonyms
- Eurylepis taeniolatus; Eumeces taeniolatus; Mabouia taeniolata; Plestiodon scutatus; Eumeces scutatus; Eurylepis scutatus

= Eurylepis taeniolata =

Species of lizard

Eurylepis taeniolata, the ribbon-sided skink, alpine Punjab skink, or yellow-bellied mole skink, is a species of skink found in Central Asia, South Asia, and West Asia. It is the type species of the genus Eurylepis.

== Description ==
Diagnosis of the genus Eurylepis (Griffith et al. 2000): Elongate, 35 or more presacral vertebrae (convergent with many other scincid groups). Limbs relatively slender, lamellae not expanded. Head somewhat conical, dorsal surface convex in lateral view, parietal bone with clear lateral indentations and supratemporal fontanelle open. Sexual dimorphism in head proportions not distinct. Scales shiny, separated by shallow sutures. Two loreals, followed by two presuboculars. Post-nasal scales present. Palpebral scales and superciliaries not separated by groove. Four or five pairs of nuchal scales, followed by several pairs of broadened mid-dorsal scales and broad row of fused mid-dorsal scales. Large medial preanal scales overlie small lateral pair. Ear lobules conspicuous, but not covering ear opening. Color pattern consists of gray-brown background, with pale, broad dorsolateral stripes, more distinct anteriorly, brown rectangular spots dominating posteriorly.

== Distribution ==
Eurylepis taeniolata is found in Jordan, the Arabian Peninsula (NW/W Saudi Arabia, southern Yemen), Iraq, northeastern Iran, Afghanistan, Pakistan, western and northern India (Kashmir, Gujarat, Rajasthan, Punjab, Himachal Pradesh, Jammu and Kashmir), and southern Turkmenistan.

== Subspecies ==
There are three subspecies:

- Eurylepis taeniolata arabicus (Szczerbak, 1990) – Saudi Arabia
- Eurylepis taeniolata parthianicus (Szczerbak, 1990) – Turkmenistan, Iran, and Afghanistan, common name Parthian skink
- Eurylepis taeniolata taeniolata Blyth, 1854
