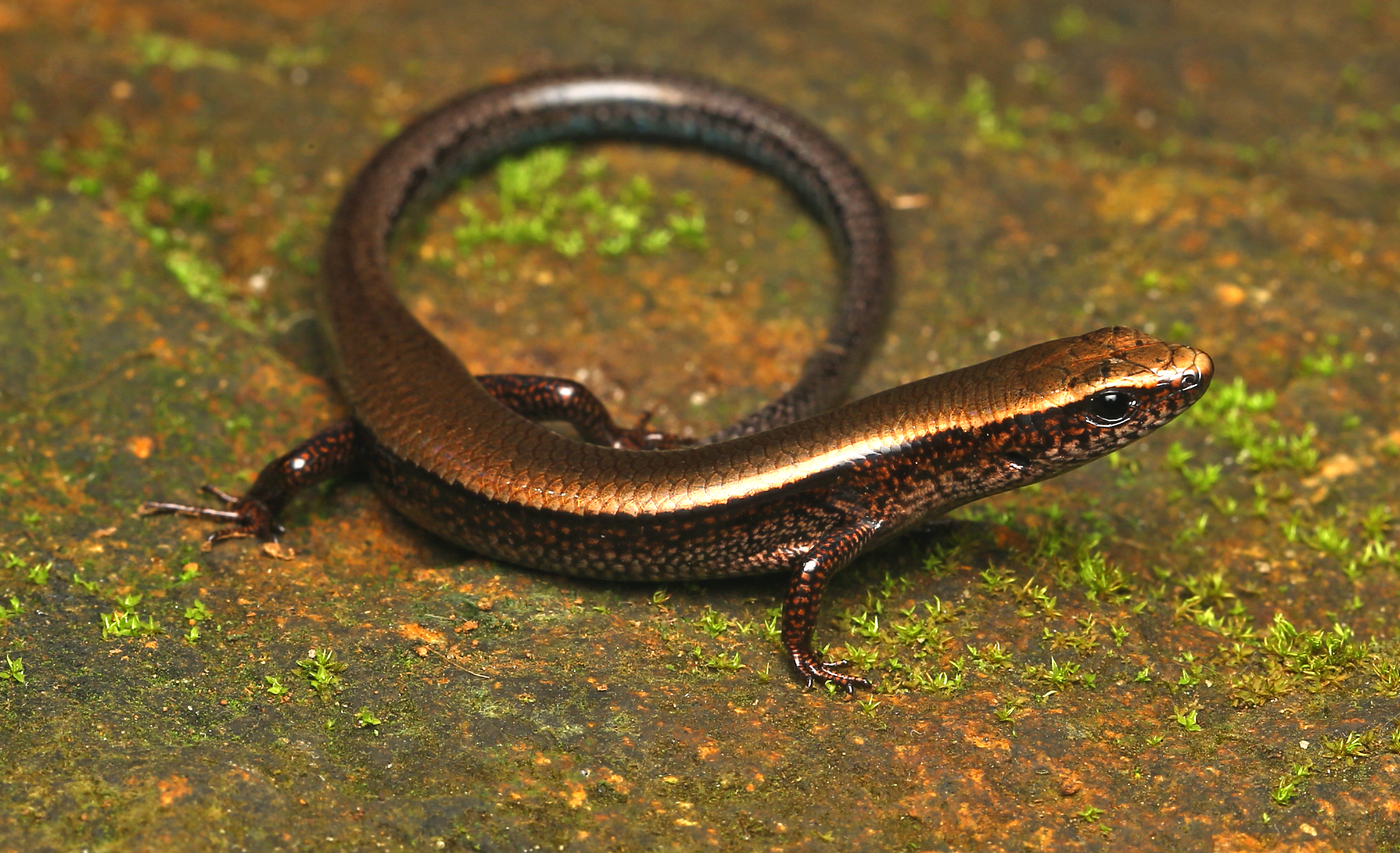

Conservation status
- Least Concern (IUCN 3.1)

Scientific classification
- Kingdom: Animalia
- Phylum: Chordata
- Class: Reptilia
- Order: Squamata
- Family: Scincidae
- Genus: Kaestlea
- Species: K. beddomii

Binomial name
- Kaestlea beddomii (Boulenger, 1887)

Synonyms
- Lygosoma beddomii Boulenger, 1887; Leiolopisma beddomei — M.A. Smith, 1935; Scincella beddomi — Greer, 1974; Kaestlea beddomii — Eremchenko & Das, 2004

= Kaestlea beddomii =

Species of lizard

Kaestlea beddomii, also known as Beddome's ground skink, is a species of lizard in the family Scincidae. The species is endemic to the Western Ghats of India.

== Etymology ==
K. beddomii is named after Richard Henry Beddome, a British army officer and botanist.

== Distribution and habitat ==
The preferred natural habitat of Kaestlea beddomii is forest at elevations of 700–2,000 m (2,300–6,600 ft).
