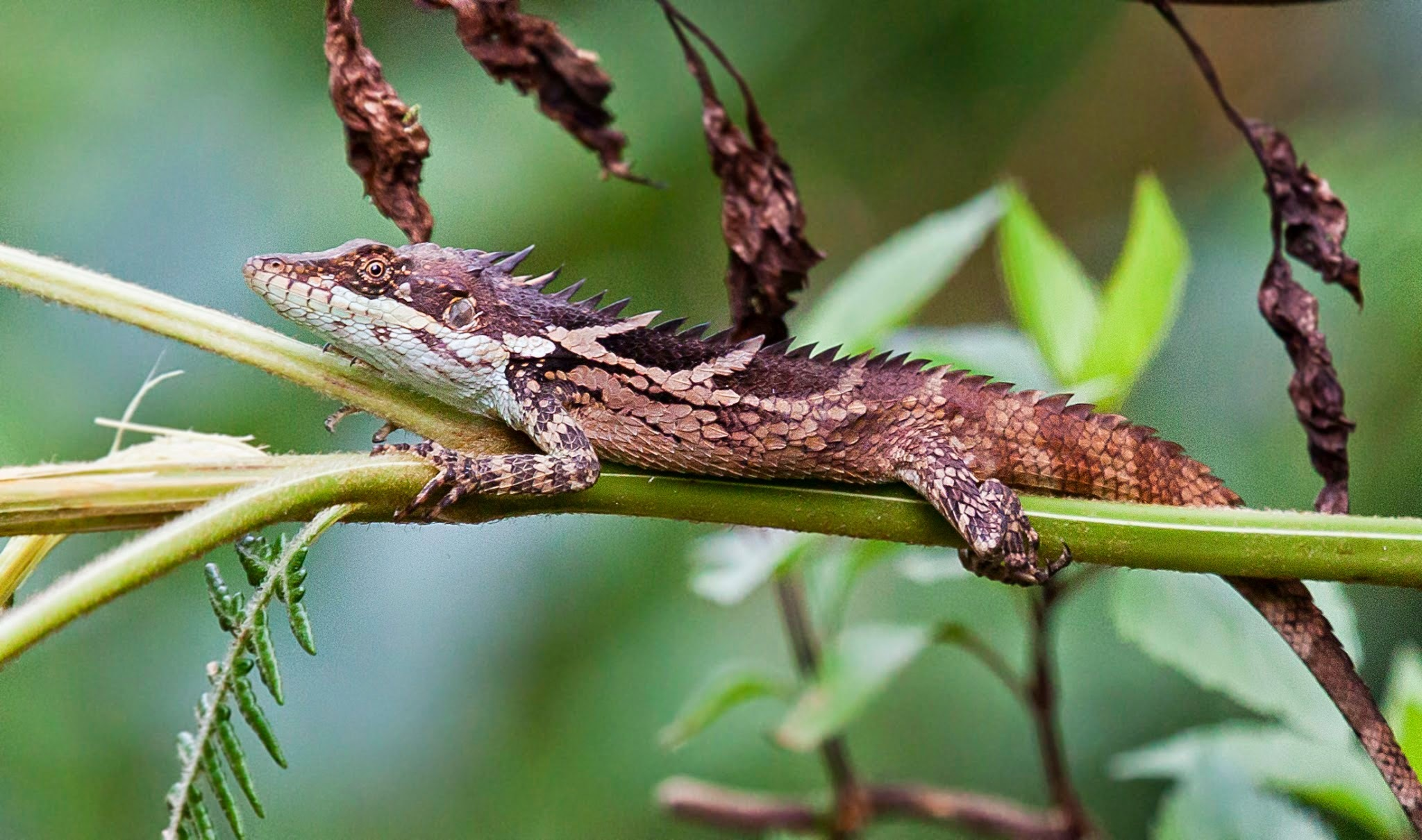

Conservation status
- Least Concern (IUCN 3.1)

Scientific classification
- Kingdom: Animalia
- Phylum: Chordata
- Class: Reptilia
- Order: Squamata
- Suborder: Iguania
- Family: Agamidae
- Genus: Salea
- Species: S. anamallayana

Binomial name
- Salea anamallayana (Beddome, 1878)

Synonyms
- Lophosalea anamallayana Beddome, 1878

= Salea anamallayana =

Anaimalai spiny lizard

Species of lizard

The Anaimalai spiny lizard or Anaimalais salea (Salea anamallayana) is a species of agamid lizard endemic to the southern Western Ghats, India. Specifically, it is found on the Anaimalai Hills (its type locality) and Meghamalai in the Kerala and Tamil Nadu states.

== Description ==
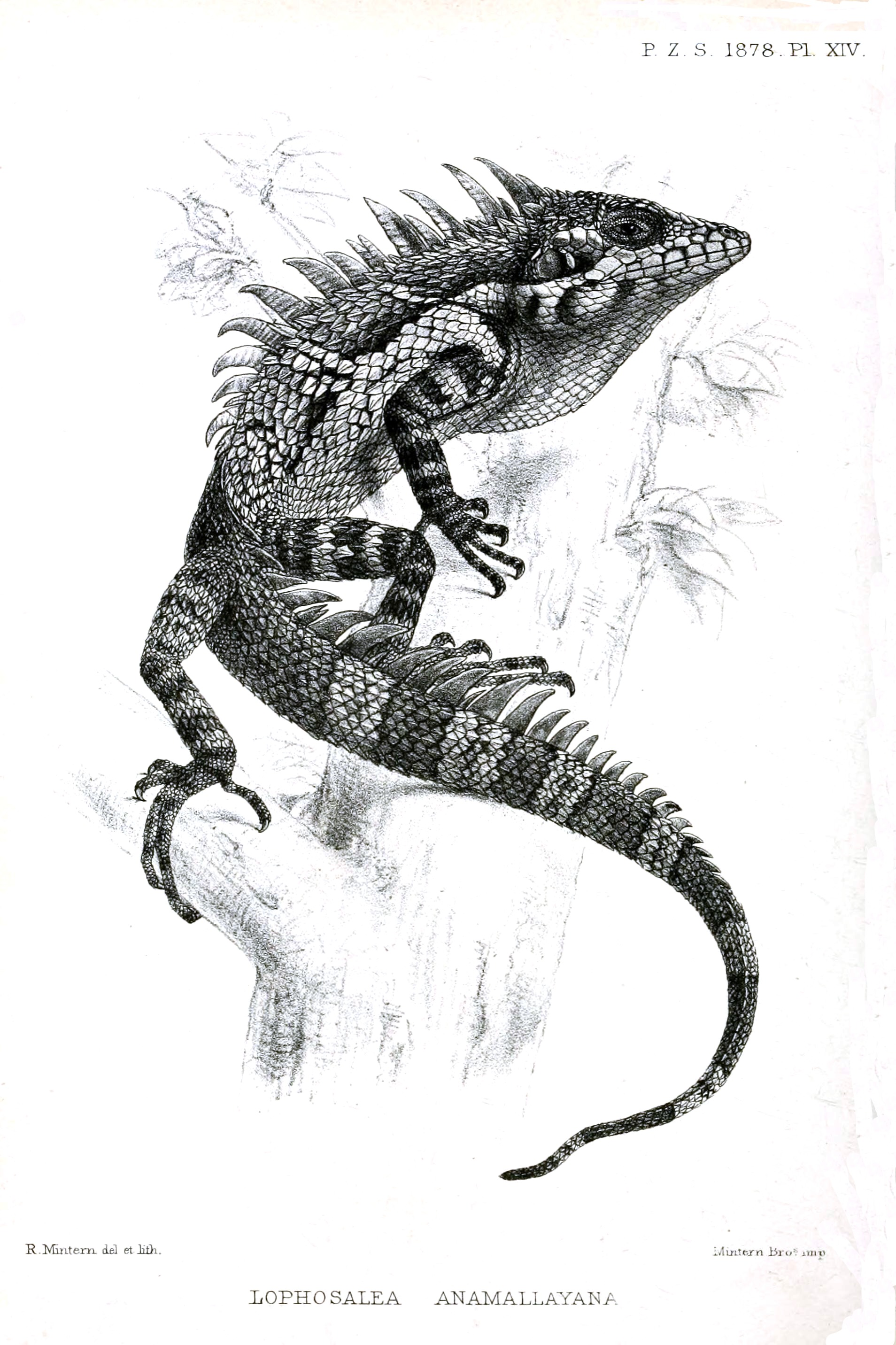
Illustration accompanying the original description of 1878

The snout long and pointed is about twice as long as the diameter of the eye. The ear opening is 1.6 times the diameter of the eye. The scales on the top of the head are large with a curved series of large scales bordering the region above the eye. An enlarged tubercle is present behind the edge of the brow ridge and a few on the back of the head. A row of 3 or four large scales is present from the eye to above the ear opening. The scales of the chin are larger than the ventral and can be smooth or keeled. A curved fold on each side of the neck, in front of the shoulders is well marked and the crest on top of the back of the head is made up large lance like spines of unequal size. The scales on the underside are imbricate and keeled and end in a spine. The hind legs are long and when held along the body they reach until the nick. The tail is compressed with a crest on the anterior part. The scales on the underside of the tail are unequal, keeled and pale olive. There are usually four broad angular bands on the back which are dark brown. The head to lip is dark brown with light spots.

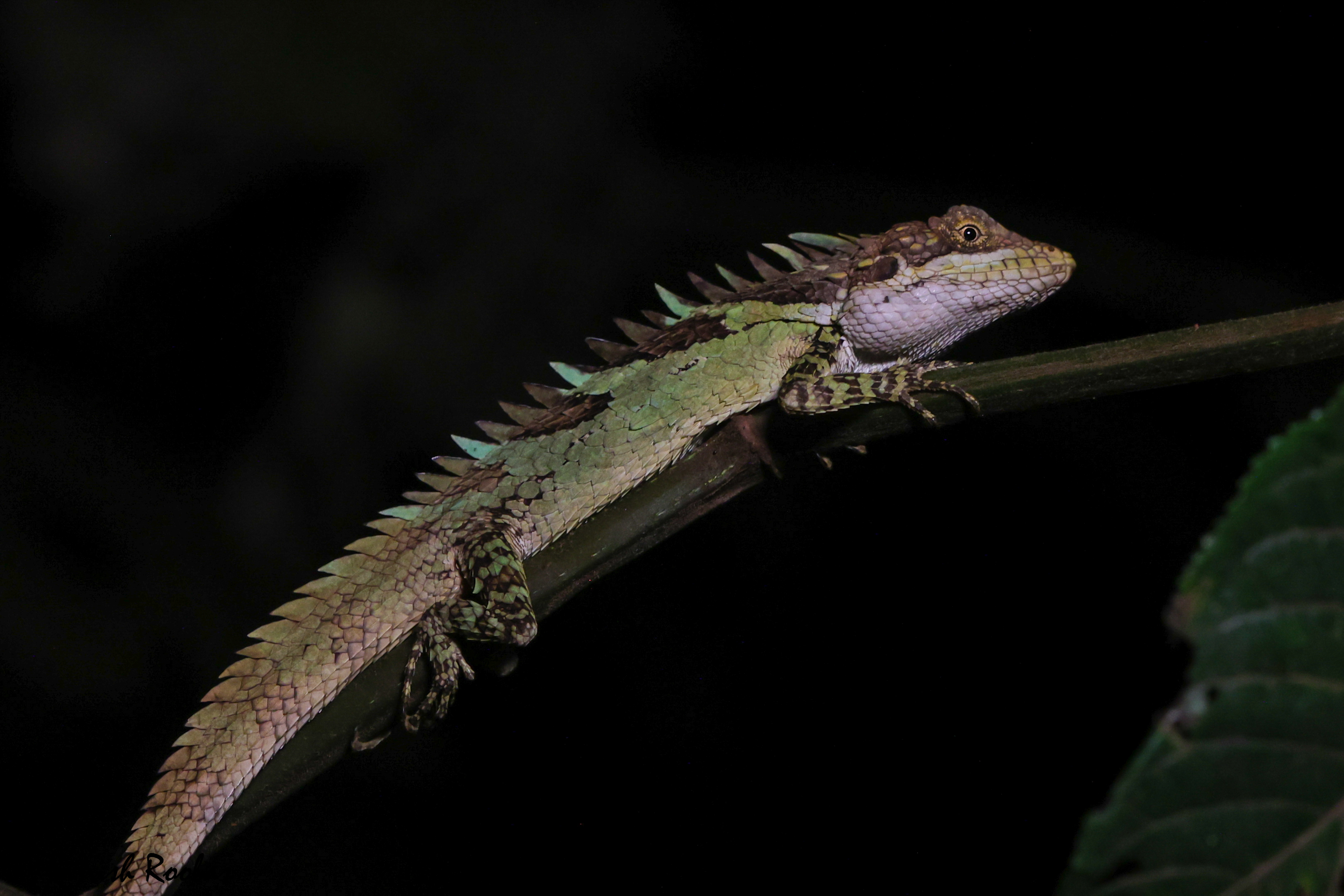
Salea anamallayana from Munnar, South Western Ghats

From snout to vent the adult is about 4.3 inches long.

== Habitat ==
Salea anamallayana occurs in moist montane forests, and also on bushes, hedges and in gardens. On the Anaimalai Hills it is common in montane shola forests and tea plantations. It lives at relatively high altitudes, 1,700–2,300 m (5,600–7,500 ft) asl.
