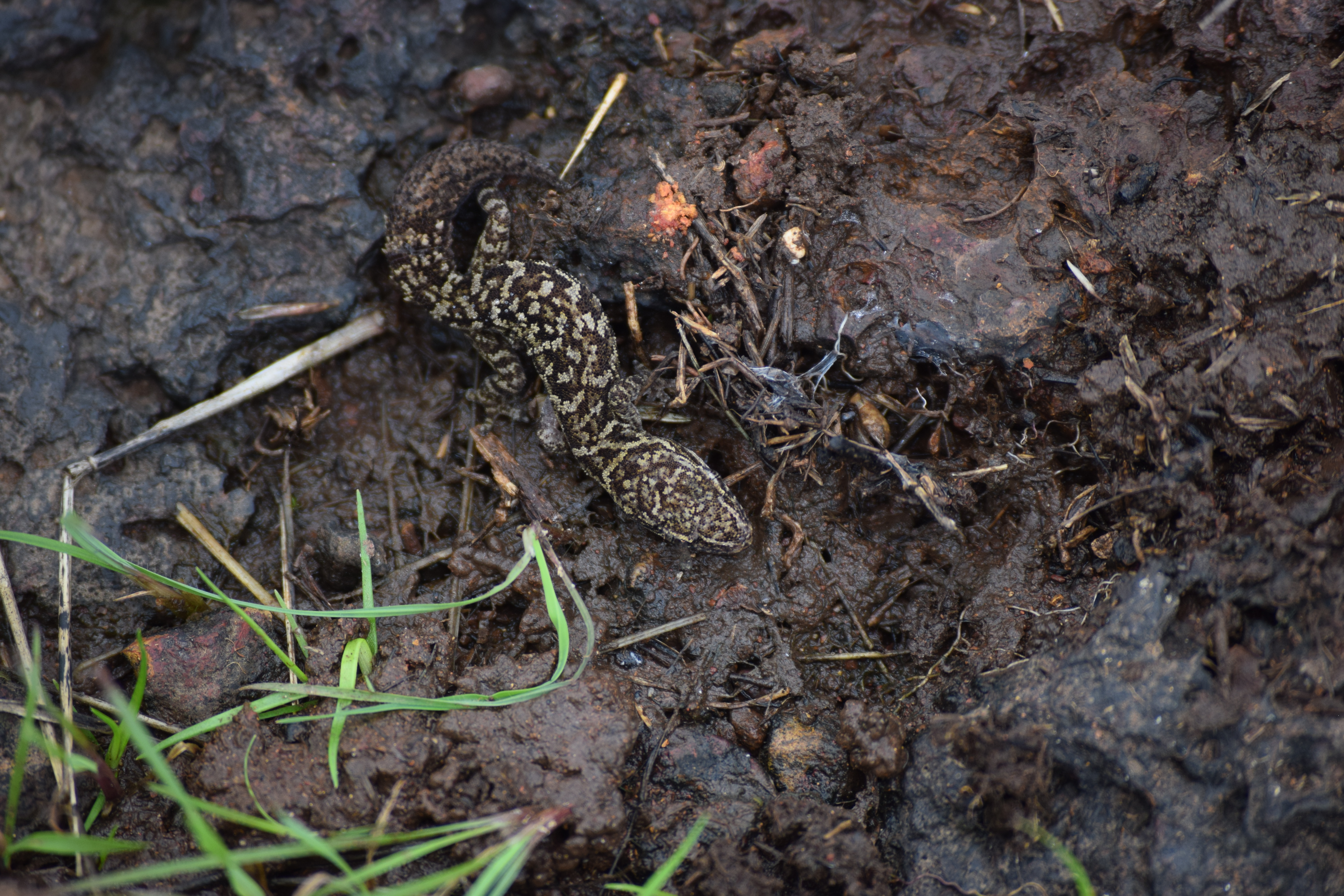

Conservation status
- Vulnerable (IUCN 3.1)

Scientific classification
- Kingdom: Animalia
- Phylum: Chordata
- Class: Reptilia
- Order: Squamata
- Suborder: Gekkota
- Family: Gekkonidae
- Genus: Hemidactylus
- Species: H. albofasciatus

Binomial name
- Hemidactylus albofasciatus Grandison and Soman, 1963

Synonyms
- Teratolepis albofasciatus (Grandison and Soman, 1963)

= White-striped viper gecko =

Species of lizard

The white-striped viper gecko (Hemidactylus albofasciatus) is a species of gecko endemic to India. The species, mostly found under the loose rocks on rock outcrops of the Konkan region is known to be threatened by the land-use changes. This is an uncommon, slender gecko found only in the lateritic plateaus of Maharashtra. This patchily distributed ground-dwelling species hides generally under the rocks during the daytime

== Distribution ==
The species is currently known from few localities in the Maharashtra state. The type locality is Dorle Village in Rajapur Taluka, Ratnagiri district, Maharashtra. Its distribution is poorly known, and it could be more widely spread. The conversion of lateritic plateaus to mango orchards, due to the increasing culinary popularity of the Alphononso mango varietal, has decreased populations of specialist species such as the white-striped viper gecko in their endemic region.

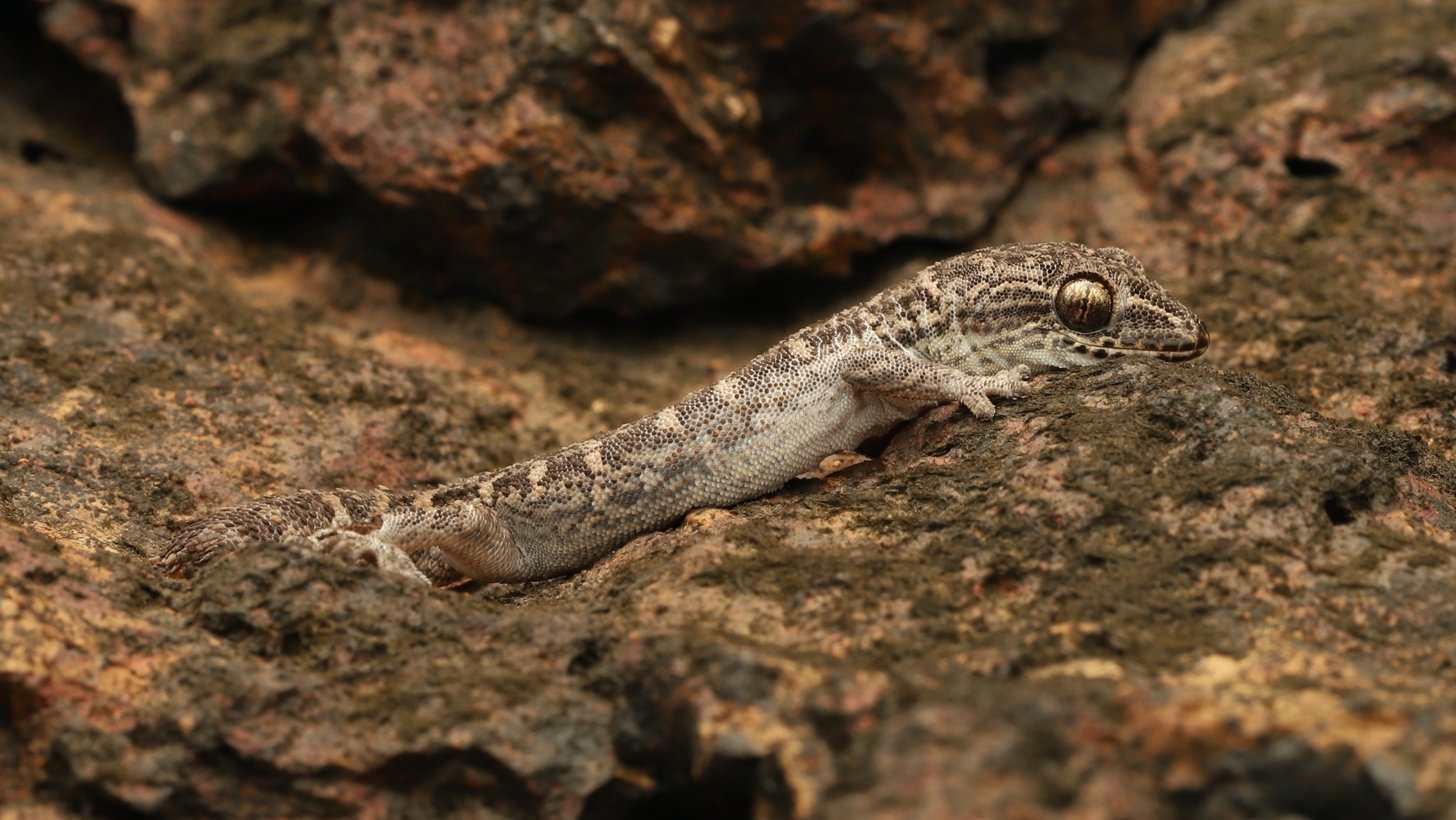
Close-up view of Hemidactylus albofasciatus from Maharashtra, India
