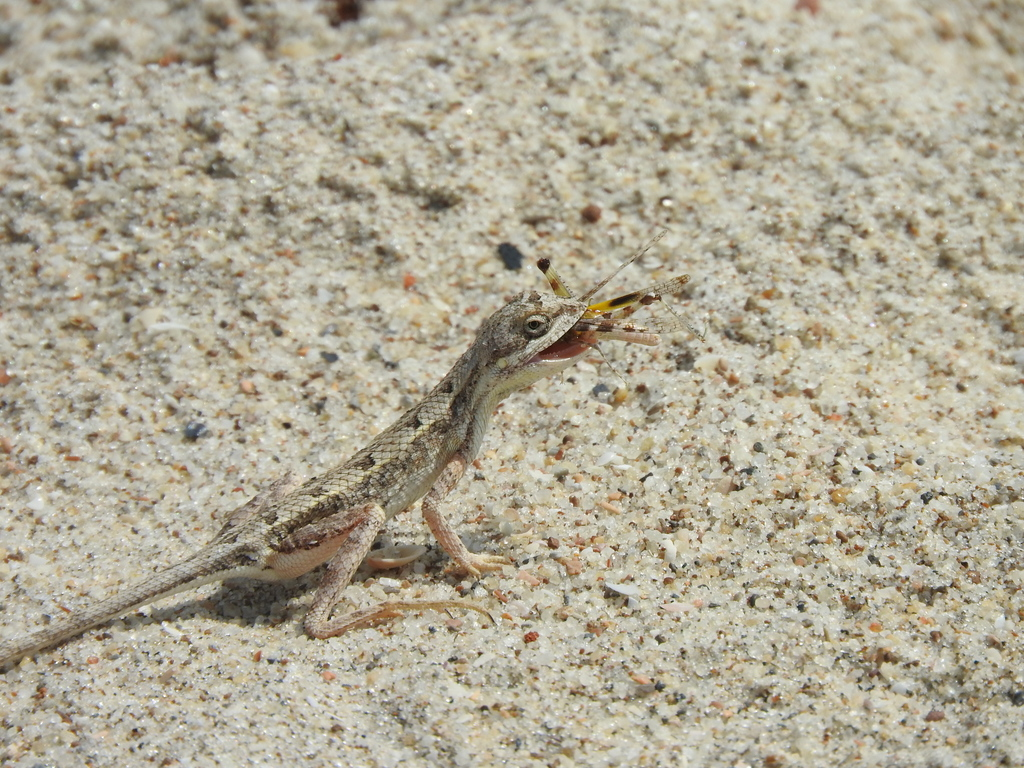

Conservation status
- Vulnerable (IUCN 3.1)

Scientific classification
- Kingdom: Animalia
- Phylum: Chordata
- Class: Reptilia
- Order: Squamata
- Suborder: Iguania
- Family: Agamidae
- Genus: Sitana
- Species: S. visiri

Binomial name
- Sitana visiri Deepak, 2016

= Sitana visiri =

Species of lizard

Sitana visiri, the palm leaf fan-throated lizard, is a species of agamid lizard. It is endemic to the Tamil Nadu region of India.

== Etymology ==
Sitana visiri's species epithet is derived from the regional Tamil language word for a hand-crafted fan made from palm leaf (also the source of the common name), because the dewlap of S. visiri resembles a local palm-leaf fan.

== Description ==
Sitana visiri can be distinguished from other members of the Sitana genus in the spinaecephalus clade by a strongly serrated dewlap with a large orange spot surrounded by extensive blue color. The dewlap of S. visiri extends up to 56% of its trunk, which is proportionally larger than that of Sitana ponticeriana, S. bahiri, and S. devakai. S. visiri is differentiated from the species in the ponticeriana clade in having a larger snout-vent length.

== Ecology ==
Sitana visiri is endemic to the Tamil Nadu region of India where it lives in coastal sand dunes, grasslands, plains, and areas dominated by Prosopis juliflora. S. visiri occurs in similar regions alongside Eutropis carinata, Eutropis bibronii, and Calotes versicolor. S. virisi is a oviparous or egg laying species, with breeding males been observed in fall (September and October) and hatchlings observed in January.
