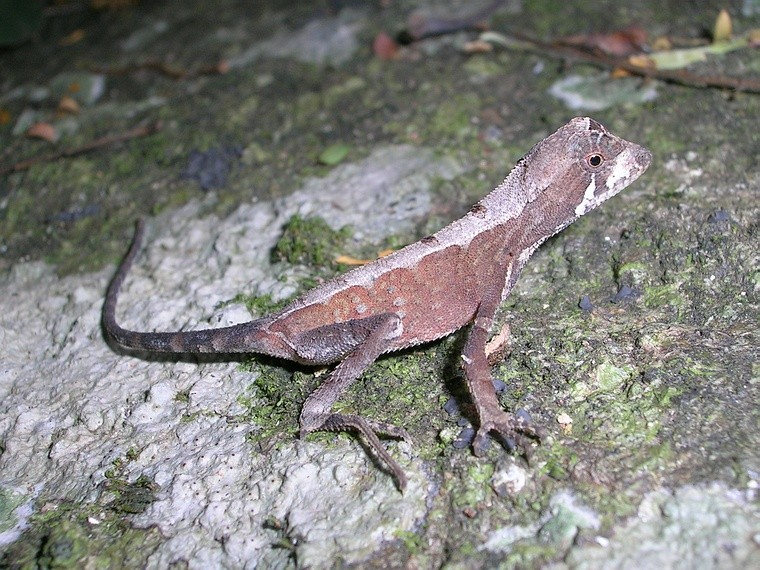
- Agasthyagama beddomii

Scientific classification
- Kingdom: Animalia
- Phylum: Chordata
- Order: Squamata
- Suborder: Iguania
- Family: Agamidae
- Subfamily: Draconinae
- Genus: Agasthyagama; Srikanthan, Adhikari, Ganesh, Deuti, Das, Kulkarni, Gowande, & Shanker, 2021

Type species
- Otocryptis beddomii Boulenger, 1885

Synonyms
- Otocryptis in part

= Agasthyagama =

Genus of Indian lizard

Agasthyagama is a genus of agamid lizards known as kangaroo lizards that are endemic to the Western Ghats of South India. Two species are known.

- Agasthyagama beddomii
- Agasthyagama edge

The type species A. beddomii was formerly placed in the genus Otocryptis which has two species Otocryptis wiegmanni Wagler, 1830 from the wet zone of Sri Lanka and Otocryptis nigristigma Bahir & Silva, 2005 from dry forests. A DNA phylogeny study found that the Sri Lankan species O. wiegmanni was closer to the peninsular Indian genus Sitana than to A. beddomii which led to the establishment of the new genus. A. beddomii is found largely to the south of the Shencottah Gap while A. edge was found in Idukki.
