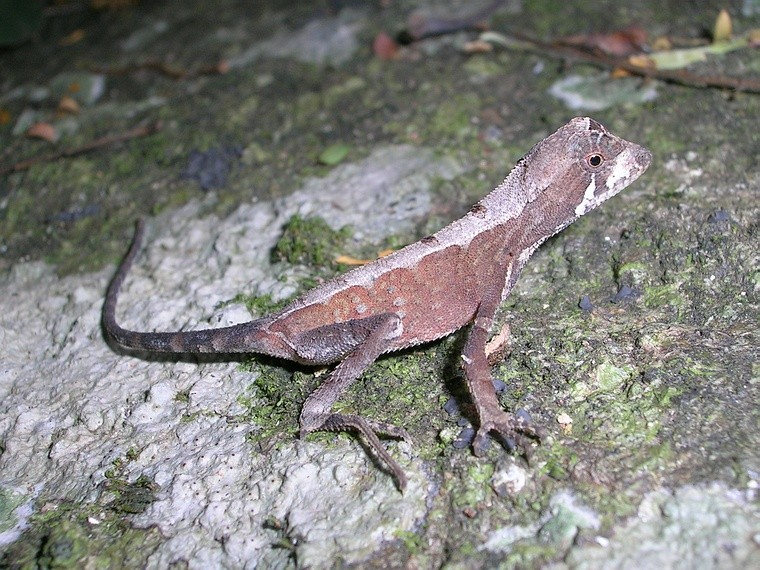

Conservation status
- Endangered (IUCN 3.1)

Scientific classification
- Kingdom: Animalia
- Phylum: Chordata
- Class: Reptilia
- Order: Squamata
- Suborder: Iguania
- Family: Agamidae
- Genus: Agasthyagama
- Species: A. beddomii

Binomial name
- Agasthyagama beddomii Boulenger, 1885

= Agasthyagama beddomii =

Species of Indian lizard

Agasthyagama beddomii, commonly known as the Indian kangaroo lizard, is a diurnal, terrestrial, insectivorous agamid lizard, endemic to the Western Ghats of South India.

== Etymology ==
The specific name, beddomii, is in honor of British army officer and botanist Richard Henry Beddome (1830–1911).

The common name, Indian kangaroo lizard, is derived from the lizard's habit of running on its hind legs with the body held upright.

== Geographic range ==
A. beddomii is endemic to Western Ghats, where it is known from Sivagiri Hills (type locality), Agasthyamalai, Cardamom Hills and Travancore hills in Tamil Nadu and Kerala states.

== Description ==
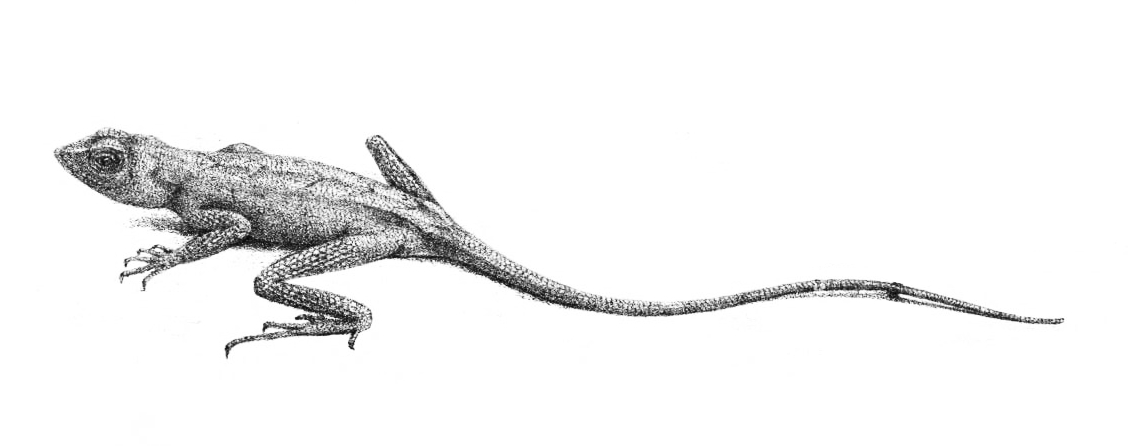

From snout to vent A. beddomii is about 1.75 inches (4.4 cm) long with a tail of about 3 inches (7.6 cm). The head is covered in scales that have a sharp keel running along the centre, a feature also found in the Sri Lankan species (O. nigristigma and O. wiegmanni ). The scales on the head between the eyes are smaller and form about two or three longitudinal series. An inverted Y shape is formed by the keels of the scales but is indistinct. The canthus rostralis (or snout) is not prominent. There are 9 or 10 scales on the upper and lower lip. There are small pits on each side of the neck and in front of the shoulder. The scales on the back are unequal in size with the larger ones forming regular V-shaped marks with the point facing backwards, enlarged ones sometimes forming regular chevrons on the back, with the point facing backward. The scales on the underside are larger than those above. The scales on the side are small but with large scales interspersed. The scales on the upper side of the legs are large and keeled. When the hind leg is held along the body, the tip of the foot reaches the snout, the heel reaching the ear opening. The tail is round and slender and about two times the length of the head and body. The tail is covered by strongly keeled scales. The colour is olive brown with patches of dark brown on the back and limbs. A dark oblique band runs below the eye to the mouth. The underside is whitish, and young lizards have a brown throat.

== Habitat ==
The preferred habitat of A. beddomii is moist leaf litter on the forest floor of both evergreen and deciduous forests, but it may also climb onto low tree trunks and shrubs.

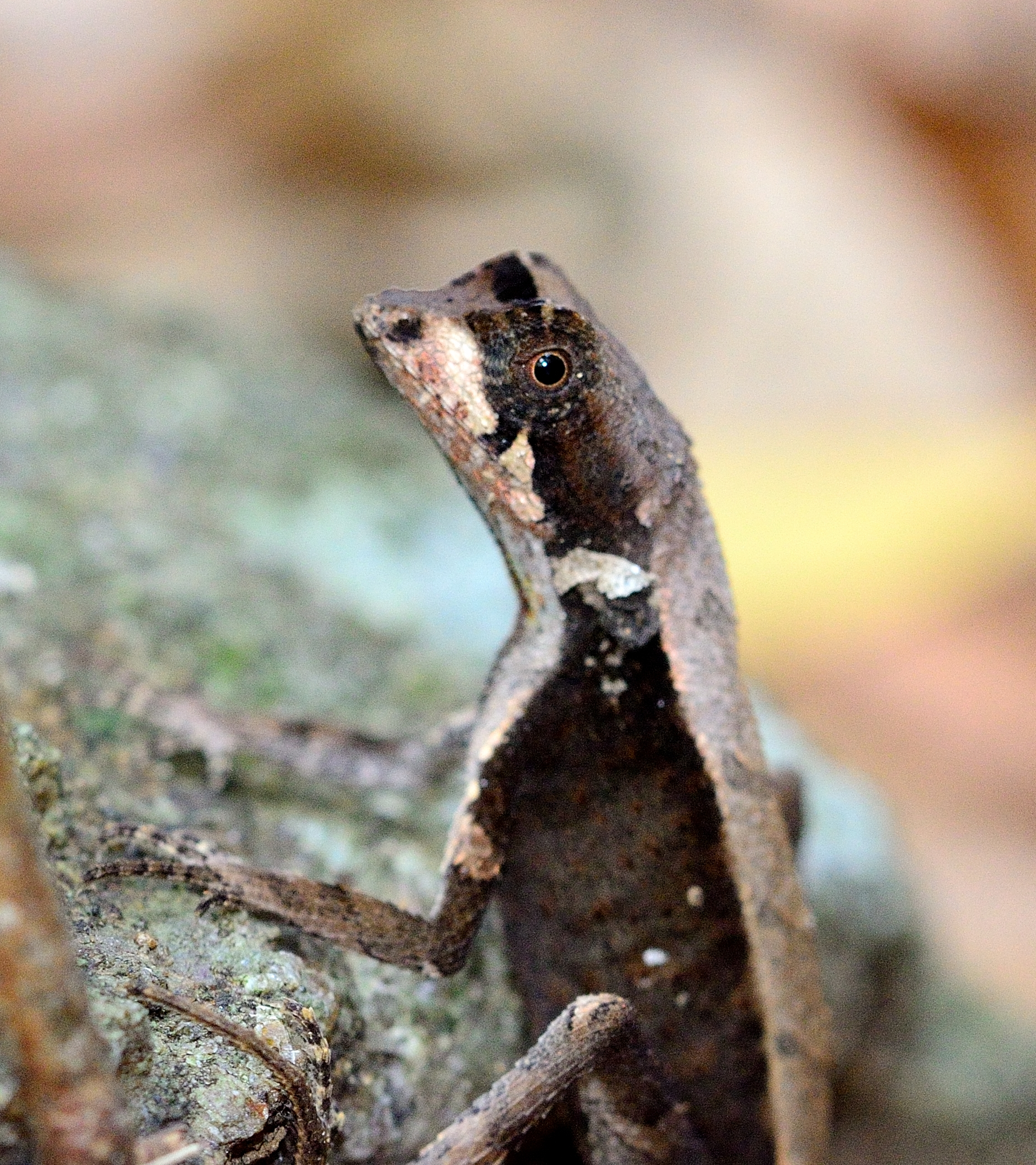
Picture taken at Shendurney Wildlife Sanctuary, Kollam, Kerala

== Reproduction ==
A. beddomii is an oviparous species, with adult females laying clutches of 3–5 eggs.

== Conservation status ==
The distribution of A. beddomii is highly fragmented in patches of dense forest in the Western Ghats from and south of the Shencottah Gap. The species appears to be sensitive to human disturbance. A record from Kodaikanal has been considered to be in error.
