= Sarada deccanensis =

Conservation status
- Least Concern (IUCN 3.1)

Scientific classification
- Kingdom: Animalia
- Phylum: Chordata
- Class: Reptilia
- Order: Squamata
- Suborder: Iguania
- Family: Agamidae
- Genus: Sarada
- Species: S. deccanensis

Binomial name
- Sarada deccanensis (Jerdon, 1870)

Species of lizard

The Deccan fan-throated lizard (Sarada deccanensis) is a species of agamid lizard endemic to India.

== Descriptions ==
Deccan fan-throated lizard is a small-sized lizard found in South Asia. Genus Sarada is a sister group to genus Sitana endemic to India, described by researchers after studying the scale patterns, skeletal structure and other external features. The male of this species displays a brightly colored dewlap during the mating season. Males are mostly active during the hot summer months. Currently, there are 3 different types of fan-throated lizards from genus Sarada described from India. Out of which, including Sarada deccanensis, Sarada superba is found in the Western Ghats.
