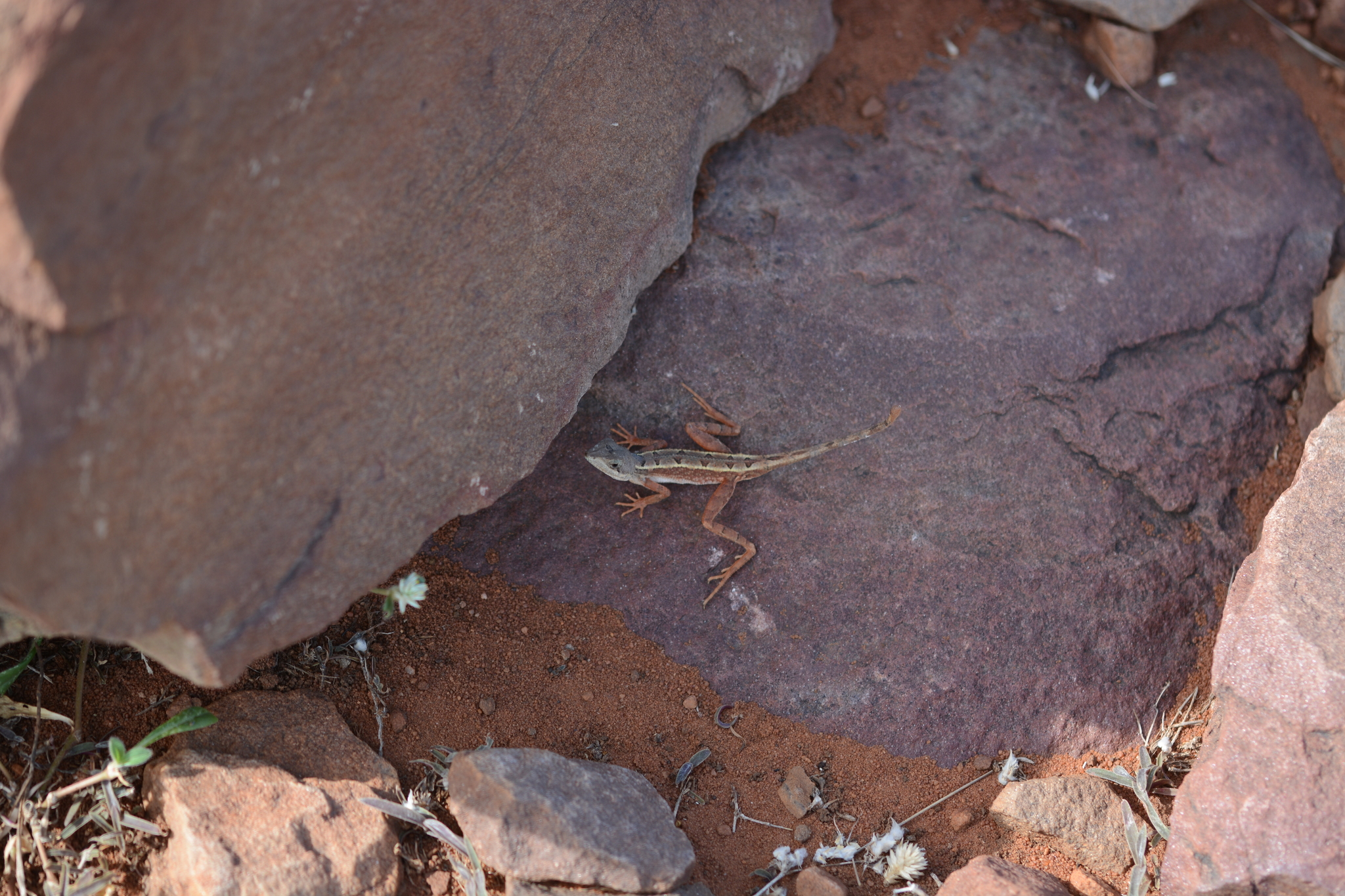
- From Gokak, Karnataka, India.

Conservation status
- Data Deficient (IUCN 3.1)

Scientific classification
- Kingdom: Animalia
- Phylum: Chordata
- Class: Reptilia
- Order: Squamata
- Suborder: Iguania
- Family: Agamidae
- Genus: Sitana
- Species: S. gokakensis

Binomial name
- Sitana gokakensis Deepak, Khandekar, Chaitanya, & Karanth, 2018

= Sitana gokakensis =

Species of lizard

Sitana gokakensis, the Gokak fan-throated lizard, is a species of cryptic agamid lizard which is endemic to India.

== Description ==
Sitana gokakensis has a darker head compared to its body, with a dark brown dorsum and blue and dark pink coloration. Its iris is yellow with cream-colored tympanum. The dorsal side has five black blotches, with brick-red flanks and cream-colored enlarged scales on the flank and thigh. The belly is off-white with brown speckles. Limbs are dark brown with red suffusion dorsally and cream-colored ventrally. The lower jaw is mostly cream, with dark blue coloration starting from the mentum and extending to the midline of the dewlap, which is white with brown-speckled scales.

== Distribution ==
Sitana gokakensis is endemic to Gokak plateau in Belagavi district of Karnataka. The samples collected from north and south outside the plateau (Nipani, Ramdurga, Bagalkot) were of S. laticeps. The Ghataprabha is a rocky river and serves as a potential geographical barrier for S. gokakensis.

== Etymology ==
The specific epithet "gokakensis" is an adjectival toponym and refers to the Gokak plateau, to which Sitana gokakensis is endemic.

== Habitat and Ecology ==
Sitana gokakensis is only known from the open rocky habitat in Gokak plateau. The habitat is xeric and is dominated by thorny and dwarf succulent species. Breeding males were recorded during May and August months.
