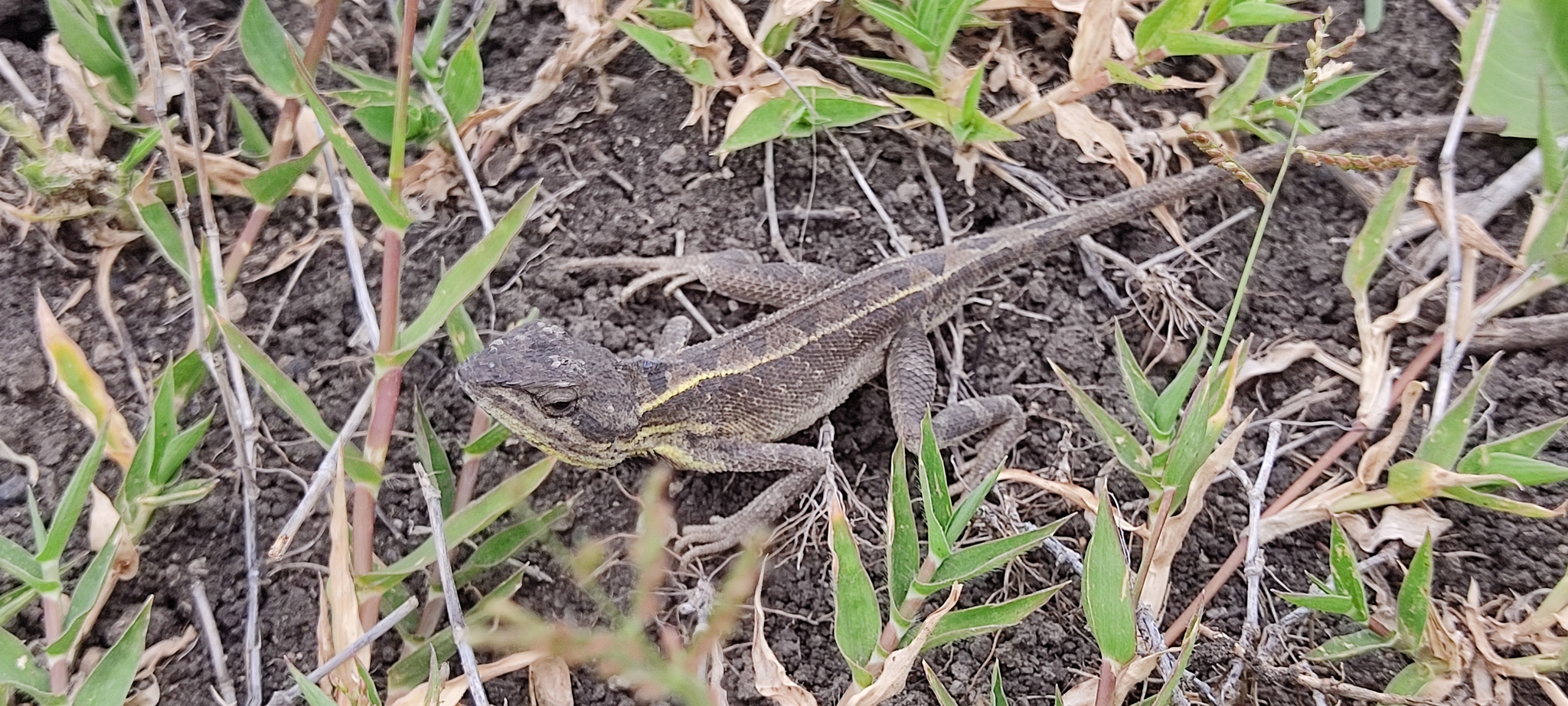

Conservation status
- Least Concern (IUCN 3.1)

Scientific classification
- Kingdom: Animalia
- Phylum: Chordata
- Class: Reptilia
- Order: Squamata
- Suborder: Iguania
- Family: Agamidae
- Genus: Sarada
- Species: S. darwini

Binomial name
- Sarada darwini Deepak, Karanth, Dutta, & Giri, 2016

= Sarada darwini =

Species of lizard

Sarada darwini, Darwin's large fan-throated lizard, is a species of agamid lizard. It is endemic to India.
