= Sitana dharwarensis =

Scientific classification
- Kingdom: Animalia
- Phylum: Chordata
- Class: Reptilia
- Order: Squamata
- Suborder: Iguania
- Family: Agamidae
- Genus: Sitana
- Species: S. dharwarensis

Binomial name
- Sitana dharwarensis Ambekar, Murthy, & Mirza, 2020

Species of lizard

Sitana dharwarensis is a species of agamid lizard. It is endemic to India.
