= Sitana thondalu =

Conservation status
- Near Threatened (IUCN 3.1)

Scientific classification
- Kingdom: Animalia
- Phylum: Chordata
- Class: Reptilia
- Order: Squamata
- Suborder: Iguania
- Family: Agamidae
- Genus: Sitana
- Species: S. thondalu

Binomial name
- Sitana thondalu Deepak, Khandekar, Chaitanya, & Karanth, 2018

Species of lizard

Sitana thondalu, the Nagarjuna Sagar fan-throated lizard, is a species of agamid lizard. It is endemic to India.
