= Sitana sivalensis =

Siwalik Sitana

Conservation status
- Least Concern (IUCN 3.1)

Scientific classification
- Kingdom: Animalia
- Phylum: Chordata
- Class: Reptilia
- Order: Squamata
- Suborder: Iguania
- Family: Agamidae
- Genus: Sitana
- Species: S. sivalensis

Binomial name
- Sitana sivalensis Schleich, Kästle and Shah, 1998

Species of lizard

Sitana sivalensis is a species of agamid lizard endemic to Nepal. Its common name is the Siwalik sitana

== Other references ==
- Schleich & Kästle, 1998: Sitana fusca spec. nov., a further species from the Sitana sivalensis- complex. Contributions to the herpetology of south-Asia (Nepal, India), Fuhlrott-Museum, Wuppertal, (pp. 207–226).
- Kelaart, Edward Fred 1854 Catalogue of reptiles collected in Ceylon. Ann. Mag. Nat. Hist. (2) 13: 137–140
