= Sitana fusca =

Dark sitana

Conservation status
- Critically Endangered (IUCN 3.1)

Scientific classification
- Kingdom: Animalia
- Phylum: Chordata
- Class: Reptilia
- Order: Squamata
- Suborder: Iguania
- Family: Agamidae
- Genus: Sitana
- Species: S. fusca

Binomial name
- Sitana fusca Schleich & Kästle, 1998

Species of lizard

Sitana fusca, the dark sitana, is a species of agamid lizard endemic to Nepal. Only known from Bardibas (Mahottari District, at an altitude of 316 m (1,040 ft).

== Other references ==
- Cuvier, G. J. L. N. F. D. 1829 Le Règne Animal Distribué d'après son Organisation, pour servir de base à l'Histoire naturelle des Animaux et d'introduction à l'Anatomie Comparée. Nouvelle Edition. Vol. 2. Les Reptiles. Déterville, Paris, i-xvi, 1-406
- Jerdon, T.C. 1870 Notes on Indian Herpetology. P. Asiatic Soc. Bengal March 1870: 66-85
- Kelaart, Edward Fred 1854 Catalogue of reptiles collected in Ceylon. Ann. Mag. Nat. Hist. (2) 13: 137-140
