= Sitana sushili =

Scientific classification
- Kingdom: Animalia
- Phylum: Chordata
- Order: Squamata
- Suborder: Iguania
- Family: Agamidae
- Genus: Sitana
- Species: S. sushili

Binomial name
- Sitana sushili Deepak, Tillack, Kar, Sarkar, & Mohapatra, 2021

Species of lizard

Sitana sushili, Sushil's fan-throated lizard, is a species of agamid lizard. It is endemic to India.
