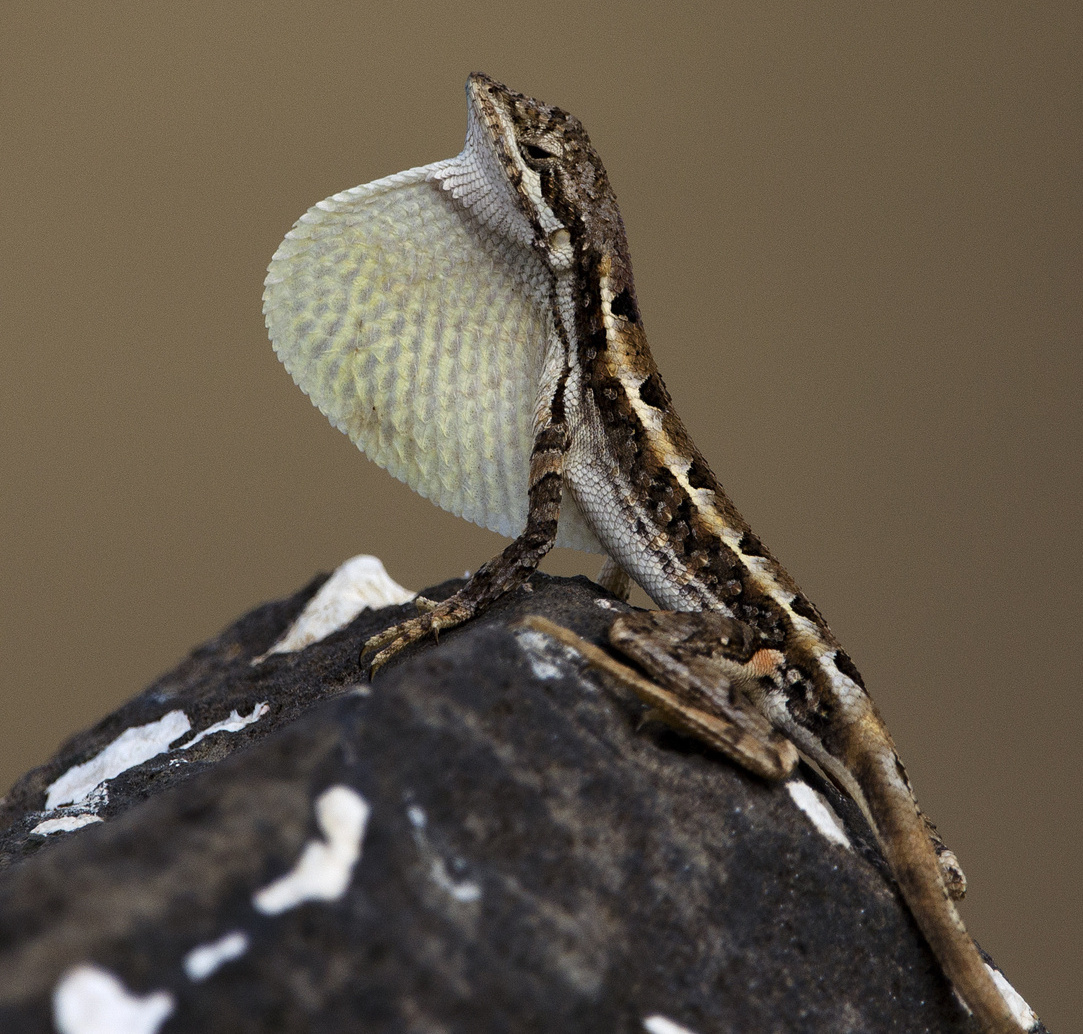

Conservation status
- Least Concern (IUCN 3.1)

Scientific classification
- Kingdom: Animalia
- Phylum: Chordata
- Order: Squamata
- Suborder: Iguania
- Family: Agamidae
- Genus: Sitana
- Species: S. spinaecephalus

Binomial name
- Sitana spinaecephalus Deepak, Vyas, & Giri, 2016

= Sitana spinaecephalus =

Species of lizard

Sitana spinaecephalus, the spiny-headed fan-throated lizard, is a species of agamid lizard. It is endemic to India. It is found in scrublands and forests occurring in the west-central states of Gujarat, Rajasthan, Maharashtra and Madhya Pradesh.

== Description ==
S. spinaecephalus are medium sized lizards; males (48.5 ± 2.9), females (44.8 ± 4.2). The lizards are oviparous.

Like the rest of the genus Sitana, It primarily feeds on arthropods. When disturbed, the male members of the species may trigger its dewlap to intimidate the predator, it may also use its dewlap for communication during the breeding season.

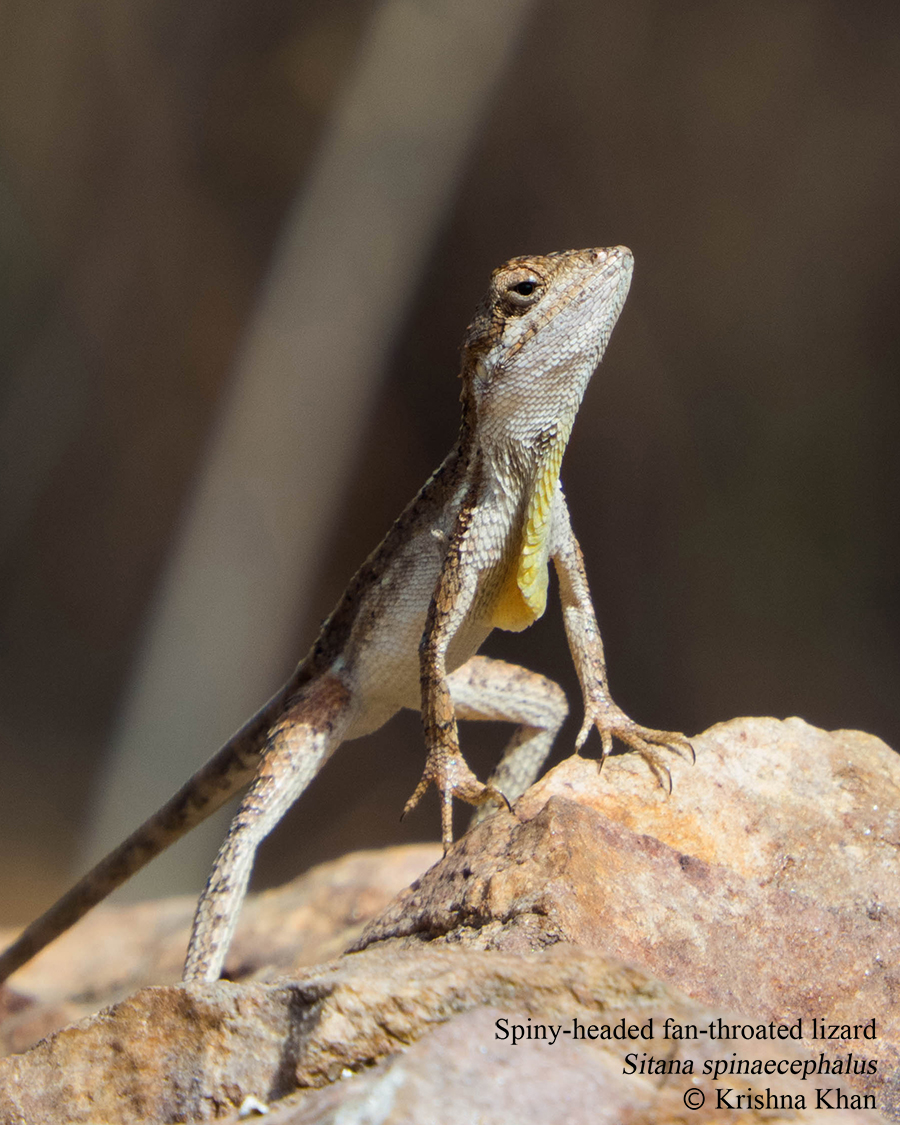
Spiny-headed fan-throated lizard Sitana spinaecephalus by Ashahar alias Krishna Khan Amravati

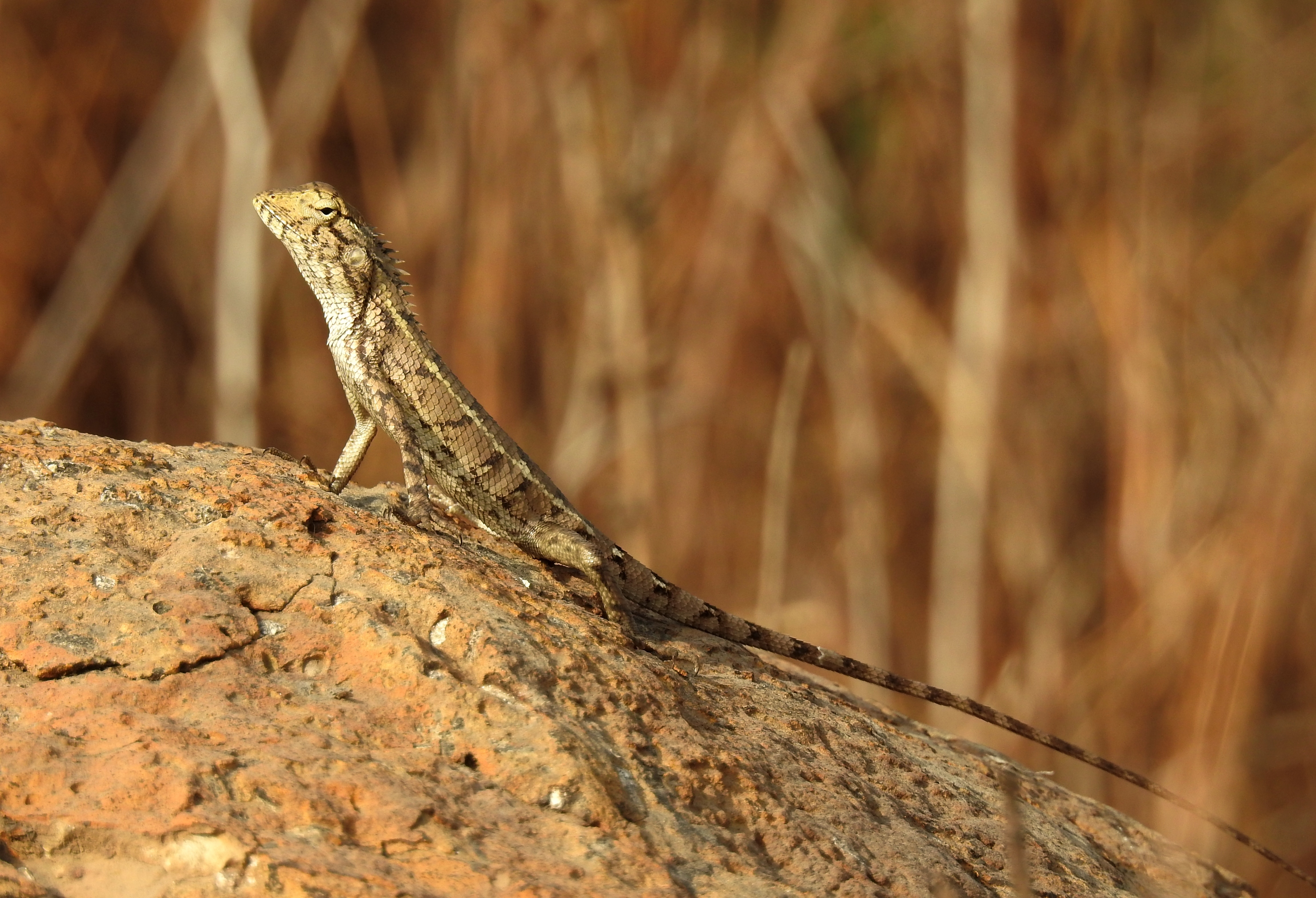
Spiny-headed Fan-throated Lizard Sitana spinaecephalus. Photographed by Dr. Raju Kasambe near Dombivi, distt. Thane, Maharashtra.

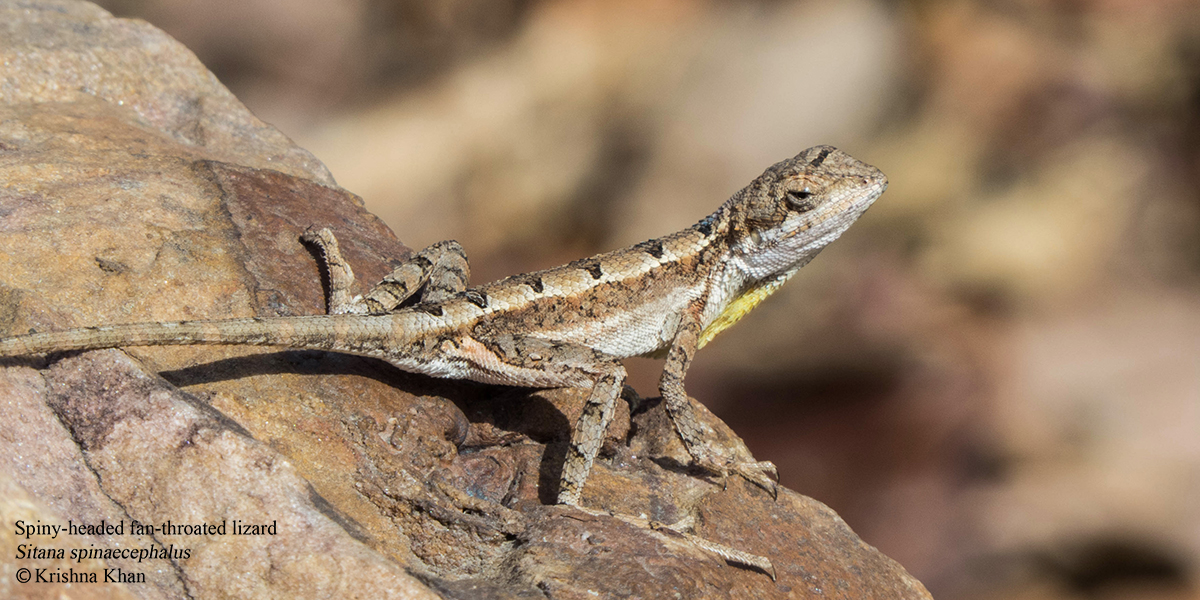
Spiny-headed fan-throated lizard Sitana spinaecephalus by Ashahar alias Krishna Khan Amravati
