= Sitana schleichi =

Conservation status
- Endangered (IUCN 3.1)

Scientific classification
- Kingdom: Animalia
- Phylum: Chordata
- Class: Reptilia
- Order: Squamata
- Suborder: Iguania
- Family: Agamidae
- Genus: Sitana
- Species: S. schleichi

Binomial name
- Sitana schleichi Anders & Kästle, 2002

Species of lizard

Sitana schleichi, the Suklaphantah sitana, is a species of agamid lizard endemic to Nepal.

== Etymology ==
The species is named in honor of German herpetologist Hans Hermann Schleich (born 1952).

== Other references ==
- Schleich, Hans Hermann; Kästle, Werner (1998). "Sitana fusca spec. nov., a further species from the Sitana sivalensis-complex". Contributions to the herpetology of south-Asia (Nepal, India). Wuppertal: Fuhlrott-Museum. pp. 207–226.
- Anders C, Kästle W (2002). In: Schleich HH, Kästle W (editors) (2002). Amphibians and Reptiles of Nepal. A.R.G. Gantner Verlag Kommanditgesellsch. 1,200 pp. ISBN 978-3904144797. (Sitana schleichi, new species).
- Kelaart, Edward Frederick (1854). "Catalogue of reptiles collected in Ceylon". Ann. Mag. Nat. Hist. (2) 13: 137–140.
