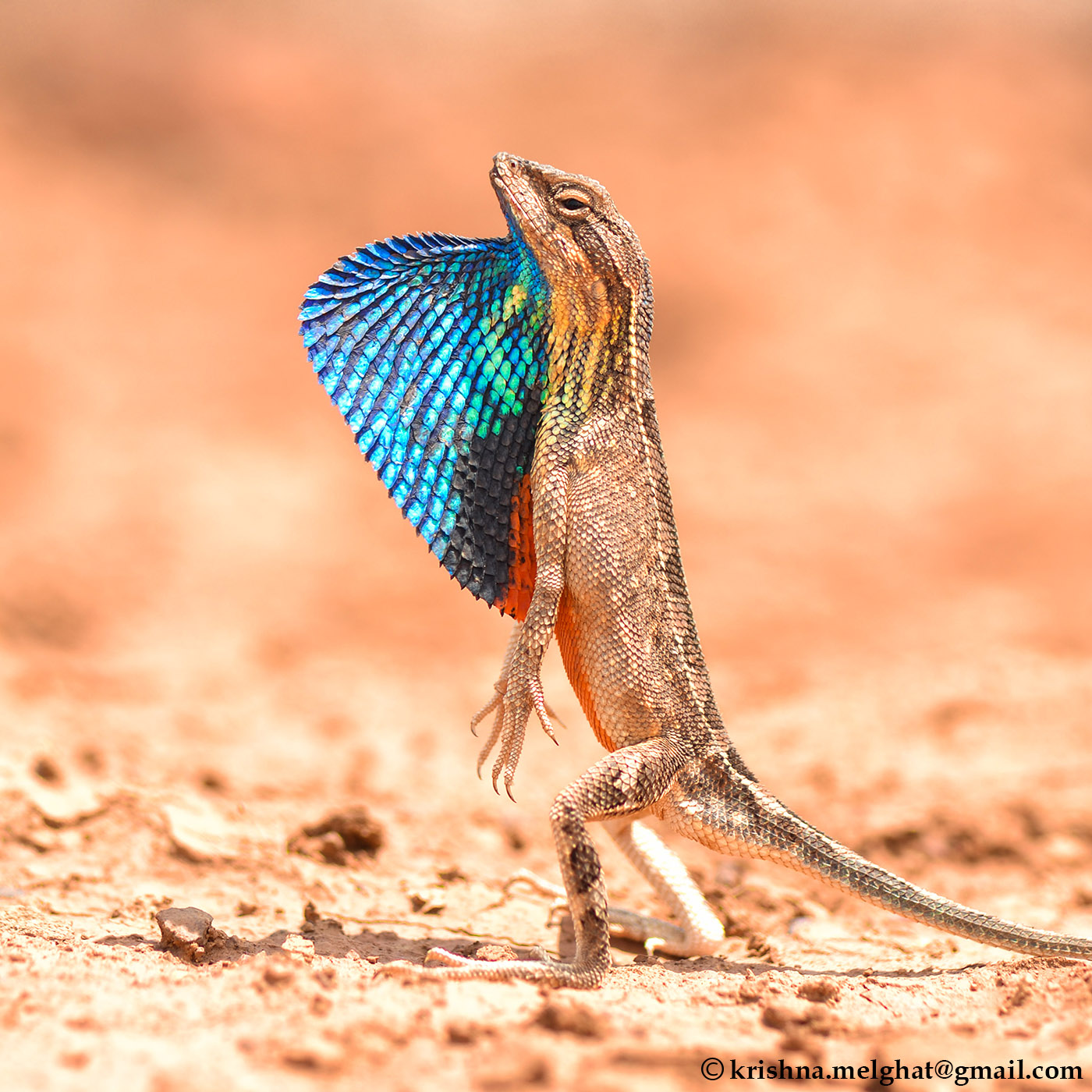

Conservation status
- Critically Endangered (IUCN 3.1)

Scientific classification
- Kingdom: Animalia
- Phylum: Chordata
- Order: Squamata
- Suborder: Iguania
- Family: Agamidae
- Genus: Sarada
- Species: S. superba

Binomial name
- Sarada superba Deepak, Zambre, Bhosale and Giri, 2016

= Sarada superba =

Species of lizard

Sarada superba, the superb large fan-throated lizard, is a species of agamid lizard found in Maharashtra, India. It was described in 2016 and in the past was part of a complex that included Sitana ponticeriana.
