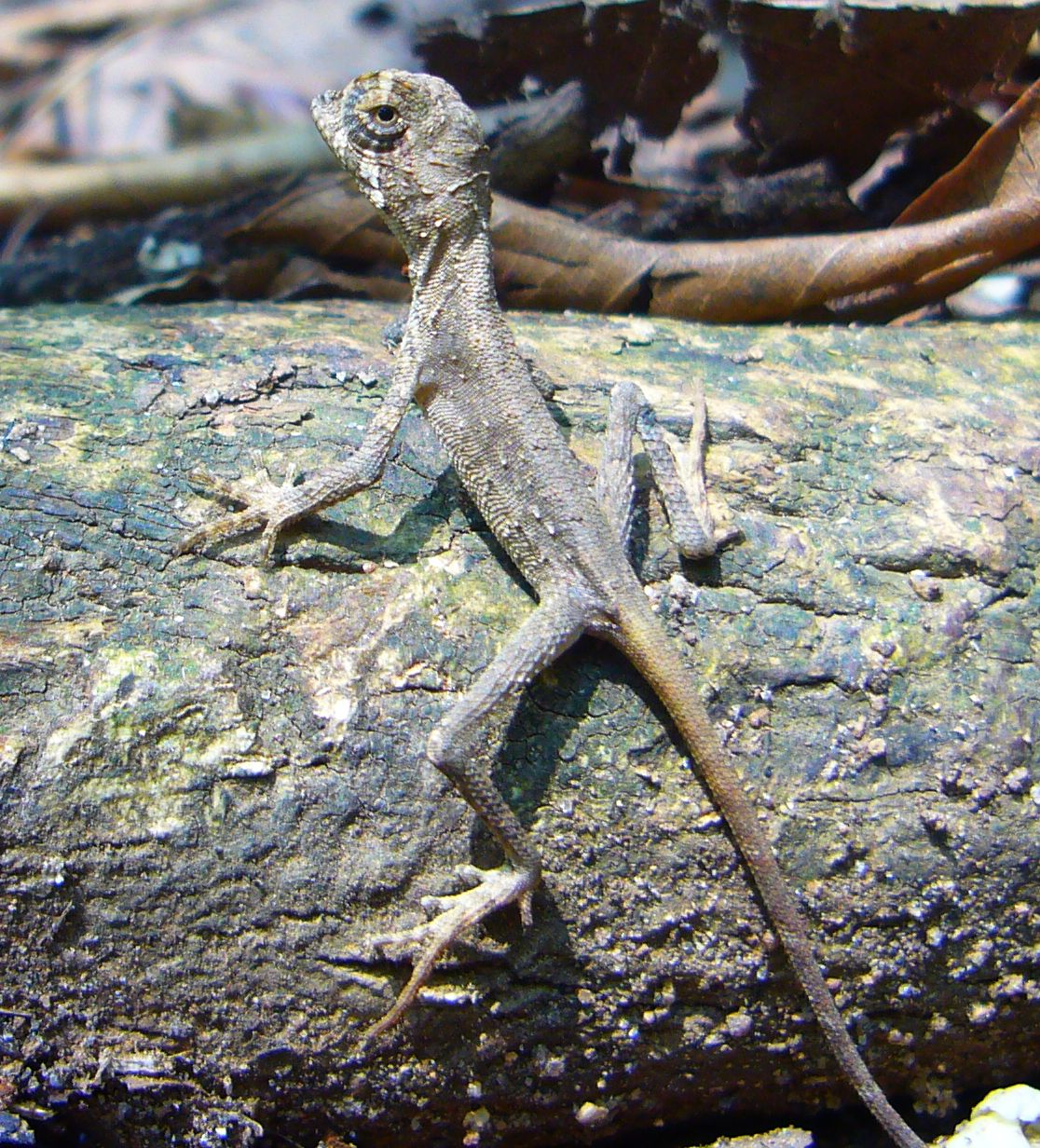
- Otocryptis wiegmanni

Scientific classification
- Kingdom: Animalia
- Phylum: Chordata
- Class: Reptilia
- Order: Squamata
- Suborder: Iguania
- Family: Agamidae
- Subfamily: Draconinae
- Genus: Otocryptis; Wagler, 1830

Type species
- Otocryptis wiegmanni Wagler, 1830

= Otocryptis =

Genus of lizards

Otocryptis is a genus of agamid lizards from the Indian subcontinent. It is the sister group for the clade formed by Sitana and Sarada. The divergence is estimated to have occurred about 12 million years ago.

Otocryptis are terrestrial lizards that can use bipedal locomotion.

== Species ==
There are two species:

Image	Scientific name	Common name	Distribution
	Otocryptis nigristigma Bahir and Silva, 2005	Black-spotted kangaroo lizard or black-patched kangaroo lizard	Sri Lanka
	Otocryptis wiegmanni Wagler, 1830	Wiegmann's agama	Sri Lanka
