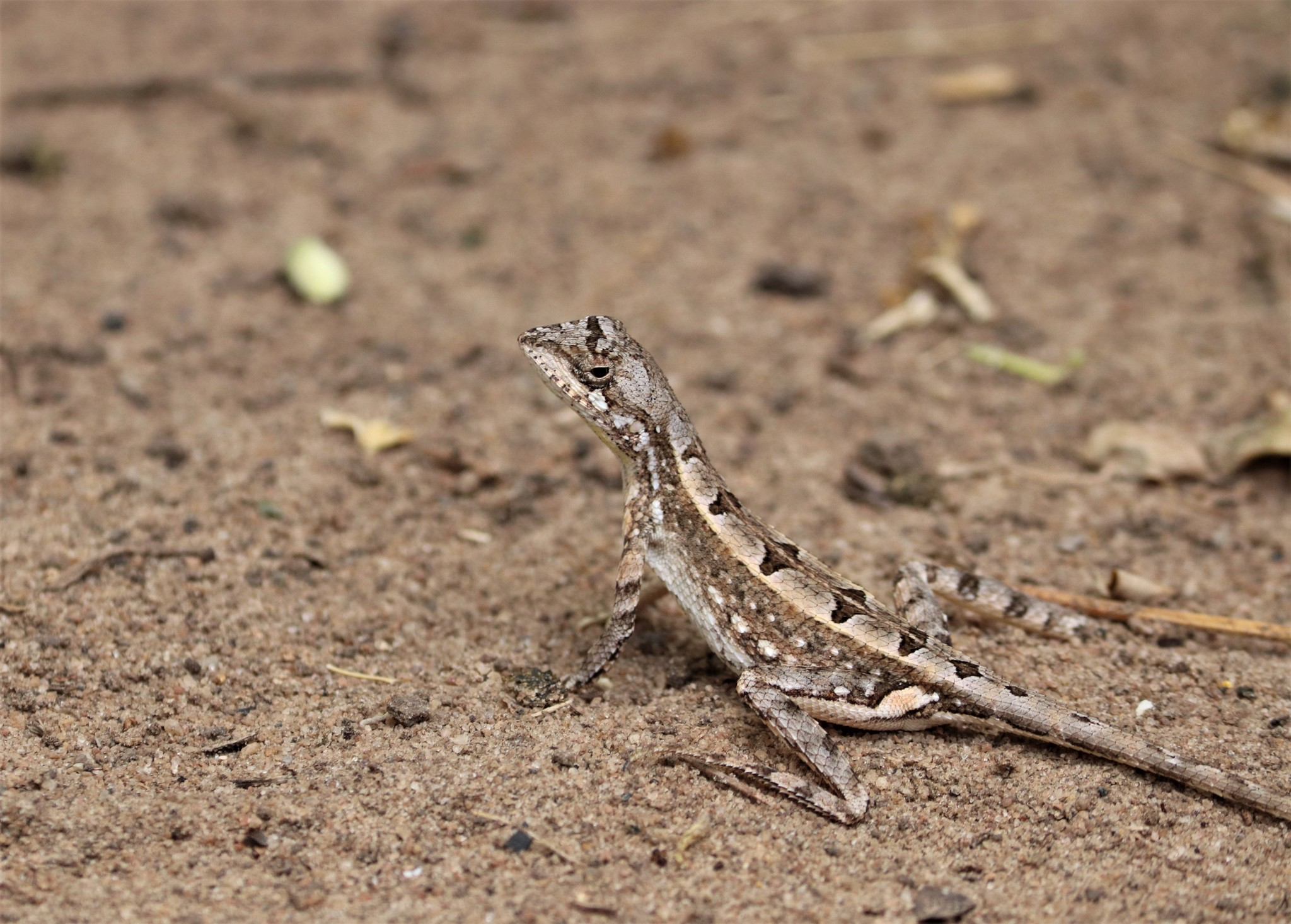

Conservation status
- Vulnerable (IUCN 3.1)

Scientific classification
- Kingdom: Animalia
- Phylum: Chordata
- Class: Reptilia
- Order: Squamata
- Suborder: Iguania
- Family: Agamidae
- Genus: Sitana
- Species: S. devakai

Binomial name
- Sitana devakai Amarasinghe, Ineich & Karunaratna, 2014

Synonyms
- Litana ponticereana Kelaart (1854) [ partim]; Sitana ponticereana Smith (1935) [partim]; Sitana ponticereana Taylor (1957) [partim]; Sitana ponticereana Wermuth (1967) [partim]; Sitana ponticereana Manamendra-Arachchi & Liyanage (1994) [partim]; Sitana ponticereana Erdelen (1998) [partim]; Sitana ponticereana Das & De Silva (2005) [partim]; Sitana ponticereana De Silva (2006) [partim]; Sitana ponticereana Somaweera & Somaweera (2009) [partim]; Sitana ponticereana Manthey (2010) [partim]; Sitana ponticereana Ponticereana Deraniyagala (1953) [partim]; Sitana ponticereana [sic] Bahir & Surasinghe (2005) [partim]

= Sitana devakai =

Devaka's Fan-throated lizard

Species of lizard

Sitana devakai (Devaka's fan-throated lizard) is an endemic species of agamid lizards recently found from Sri Lanka. The species was first found from Puttalama district. The lizard is also known to found in Tamil Nadu of India, but not given valid identification. The species was named in honor of Dr. Devaka K. Weerakoon, who is a conservation biologist. He is a Professor of Zoology in University of Colombo.

== Descriptions ==
The species was considered mainly as a subspecies or a color variation of much broader distributed Sitana ponticeriana. The lizard can be found in open scrub jungles.

== Other references ==
- Lanka newsline
- https://window2nature.wordpress.com/2015/03/
