= Sitana kalesari =

Conservation status
- Data Deficient (IUCN 3.1)

Scientific classification
- Kingdom: Animalia
- Phylum: Chordata
- Class: Reptilia
- Order: Squamata
- Suborder: Iguania
- Family: Agamidae
- Genus: Sitana
- Species: S. kalesari

Binomial name
- Sitana kalesari Bahuguna, 2015

Species of lizard

Sitana kalesari is a species of agamid lizard. It is endemic to India.
