= Sitana bahiri =

Bahir's Fan-throated lizard

Conservation status
- Endangered (IUCN 3.1)

Scientific classification
- Kingdom: Animalia
- Phylum: Chordata
- Class: Reptilia
- Order: Squamata
- Suborder: Iguania
- Family: Agamidae
- Genus: Sitana
- Species: S. bahiri

Binomial name
- Sitana bahiri Amarasinghe, Ineich & Karunaratna, 2014

Synonyms
- Litana ponticereana [sic] Kelaart (1854) [partim]; Sitana ponticereana Smith (1935) [partim]; Sitana ponticereana Taylor (1957) [partim]; Sitana ponticereana Wermuth (1967) [partim]; Sitana ponticereana Manamendra-Arachchi & Liyanage (1994) [partim]; Sitana ponticereana Erdelen (1998) [partim]; Sitana ponticereana Das & De Silva (2005) [partim]; Sitana ponticereana De Silva (2006) [partim]; Sitana ponticereana Somaweera & Somaweera (2009) [partim]; Sitana ponticereana Manthey (2010) [partim]; Sitana ponticereana Ponticereana Deraniyagala (1953) [partim]; Sitana ponticereana [sic] Bahir & Surasinghe (2005) [partim]

Species of lizard

Sitana bahiri (Bahir's fan-throated lizard) is an endemic species of agamid lizards recently found from Sri Lanka. The species was first found from Yala national park. The species was named in honor of M.M Bahir, who is one of a leading wildlife conservationist of Sri Lanka.

== Descriptions ==
The species was considered mainly as a subspecies or a color variation of much broader distributed Sitana ponticeriana. The lizard can be found in open scrub jungles.

== Other references ==
- Lanka newsline
- https://window2nature.wordpress.com/2015/03/
