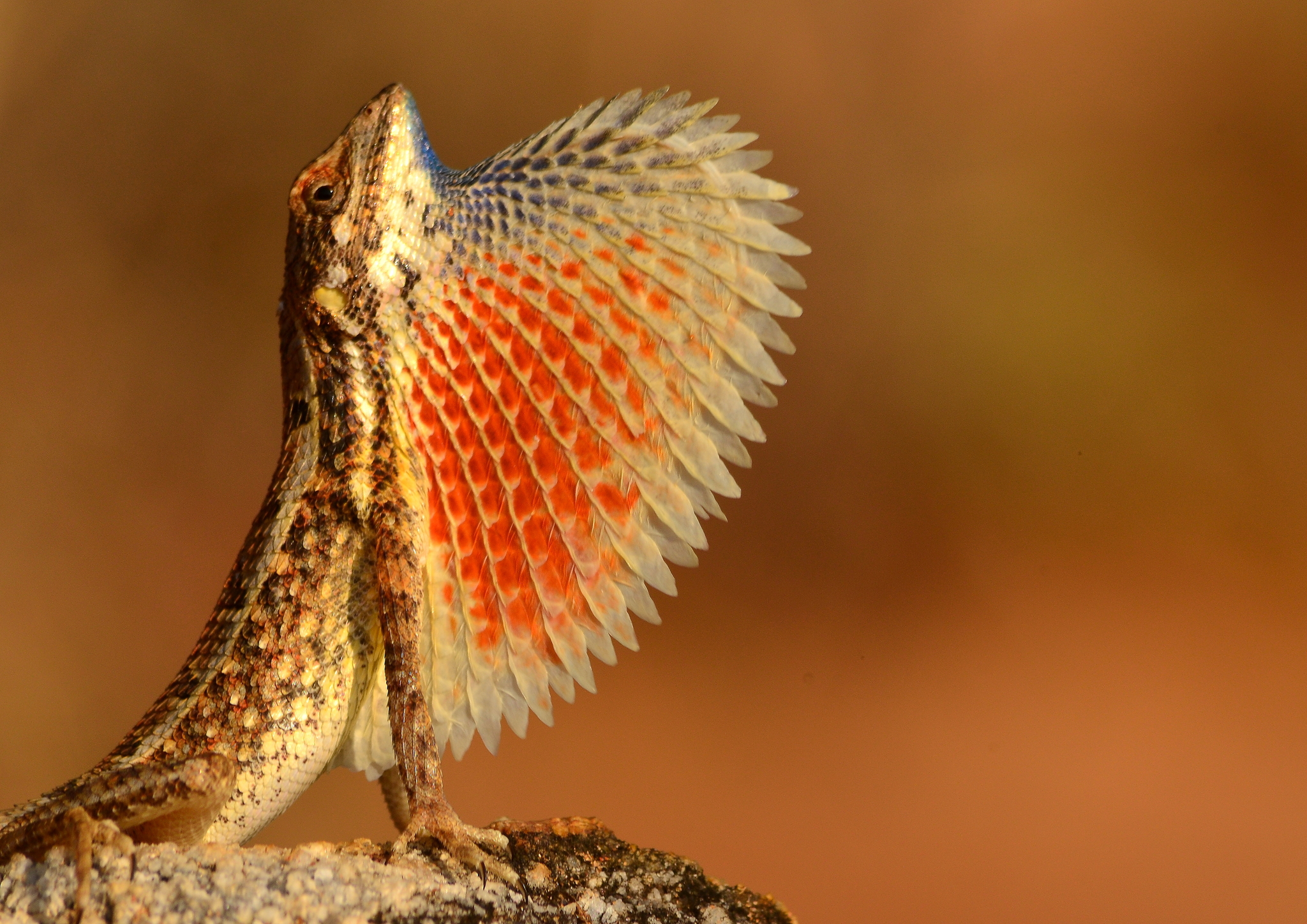

Conservation status
- Endangered (IUCN 3.1)

Scientific classification
- Kingdom: Animalia
- Phylum: Chordata
- Class: Reptilia
- Order: Squamata
- Suborder: Iguania
- Family: Agamidae
- Genus: Sitana
- Species: S. marudhamneydhal

Binomial name
- Sitana marudhamneydhal Deepak, Khandekar, Varma, & Chaitanya, 2016

Synonyms
- Sitana attenboroughii Sadasivan, Ramesh, Palot, Ambekar, & Mirza, 2018

= Sitana marudhamneydhal =

Species of lizard

Sitana marudhamneydhal is a species of agamid lizard. It is endemic to India.

In 2021, the species Sitana attenboroughii was synonymised with S. marudhamneydhal.
