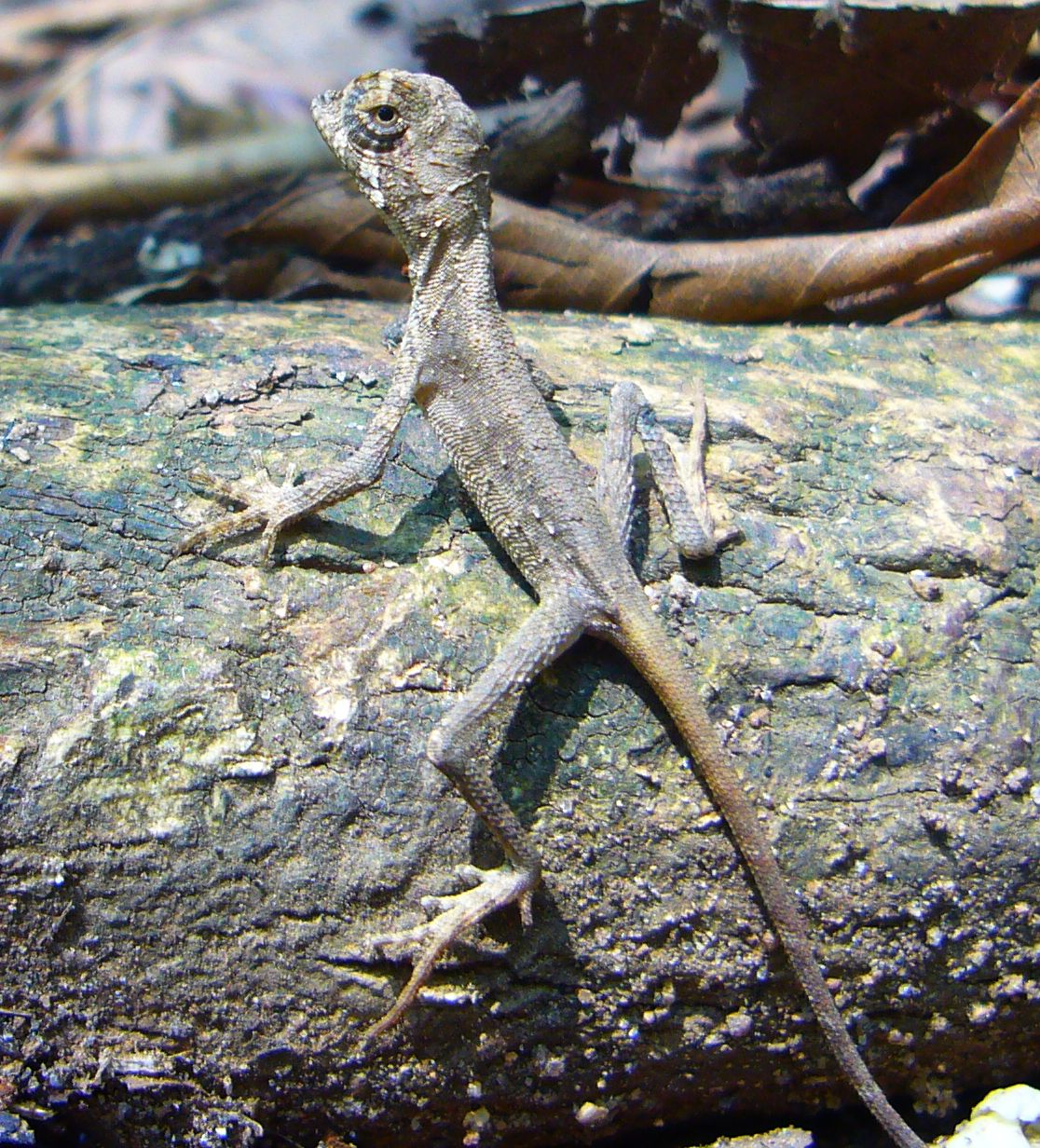
- Otocryptis wiegmanni at Udawattakele, Kandy, Sri Lanka.

Scientific classification
- Kingdom: Animalia
- Phylum: Chordata
- Class: Reptilia
- Order: Squamata
- Suborder: Iguania
- Family: Agamidae
- Genus: Otocryptis
- Species: O. weigmanni

Binomial name
- Otocryptis weigmanni Wagler, 1830

Synonyms
- Otocryptis wiegmanni Wagler, 1830; Otocryptis bivittata Wiegmann, 1831; Cophotis wiegmanni — Janzen, 2003; Otocryptis wiegmanni — Janzen et al., 2007

= Otocryptis wiegmanni =

Species of lizard

Otocryptis wiegmanni, commonly called the brown-patched kangaroo lizard, Sri Lankan kangaroo lizard or Wiegmann's agama, is a small, ground-dwelling agamid lizard endemic to Sri Lanka.In Sinhalese language it is known as "Kala Katussa - කලා කටුස්සා", "Pinum Katussa - පිනුම් කටුස්සා" and "Gomu Thali Katussa - ගොමු තැලි කටුස්සා"

== Etymology ==
The specific name, wiegmanni, is in honour of German herpetologist Arend Friedrich August Wiegmann.

== Habitat ==
The preferred habitat of O. wiegmanni is the wet zone forests and lower mountain forests (rainfall >2000 mm), up to 1,300 m (4,300 ft), of Sri Lanka. It is commonly seen in the leaf litter of shady rain forests.

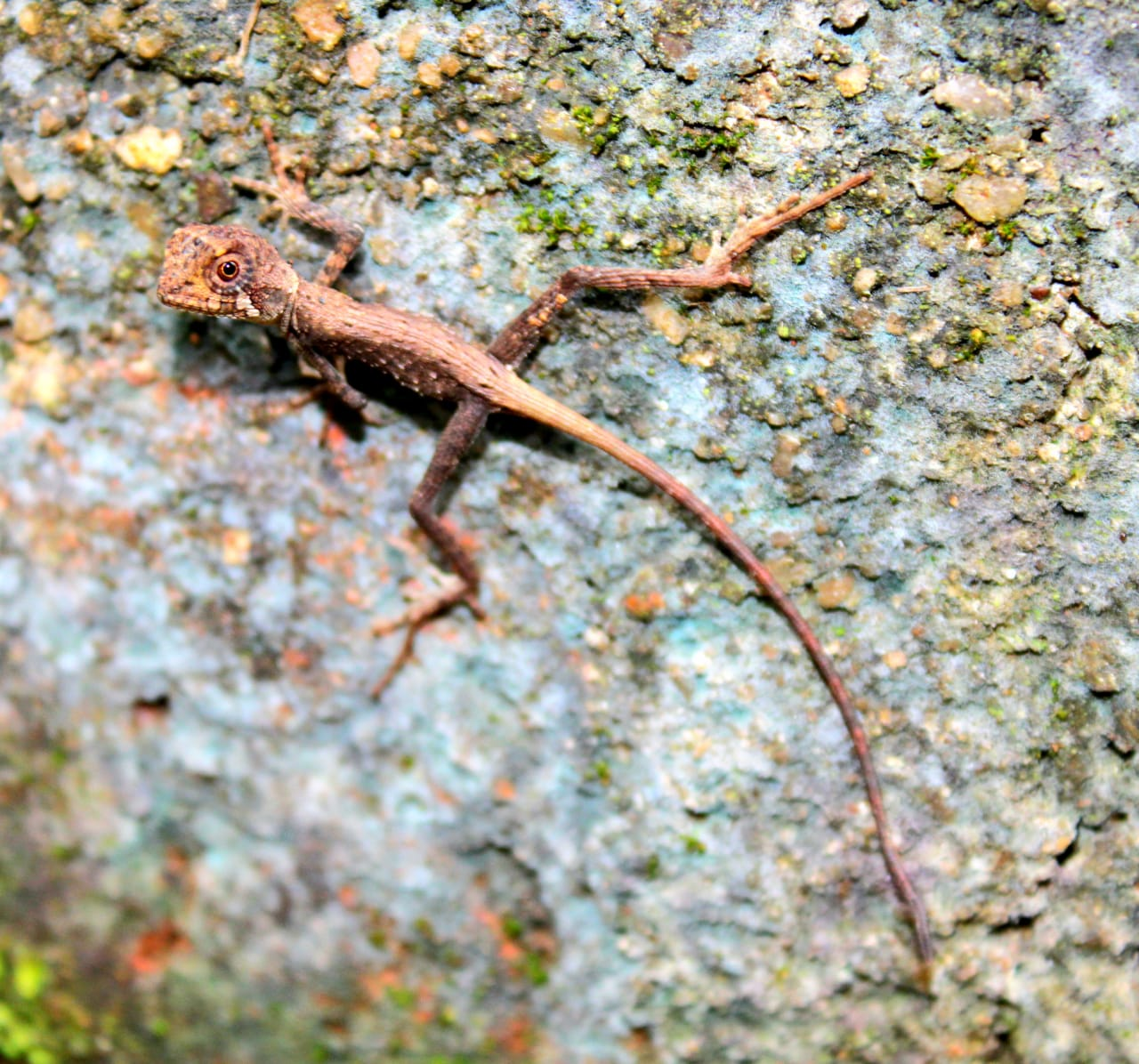

== Defensive behaviour ==
When perceiving danger, O. wiegmanni spurts away quickly on its large hind legs and might eventually climb up a sapling or tree.

== Diet ==
O. wiegmanni feeds on small insects, grubs, and tender shoots.

== Taxonomy ==
O. wiegmanni is closely related to the Indian kangaroo lizard (O. beddomii ) of the rain forests of South India.

== Description ==
O. wiegmanni may grow to an adult body size of about 7 cm (2.8 in) snout-to-vent length (SVL), plus a tail 15 cm (5.9 in) long. Its colour ranges from dark reddish brown to dull brown. Males are darker than females. Males have a maroon patch on their gular sac.

== Reproduction ==
Male O. wiegmanni are territorial and can defend their territory against intruders through displays and fights. Females lay between three and five eggs in a nest in the ground between July and January, with a peak between October and January. The eggs are ellipsoidal, measuring 7 mm–7.5 mm × 10 mm–17 mm (0.28 in–0.30 in × 0.39 in–0.67 in). Hatchlings emerge after 57–70 days.
