= Dewlap =

Skin hanging below the jaw of animals

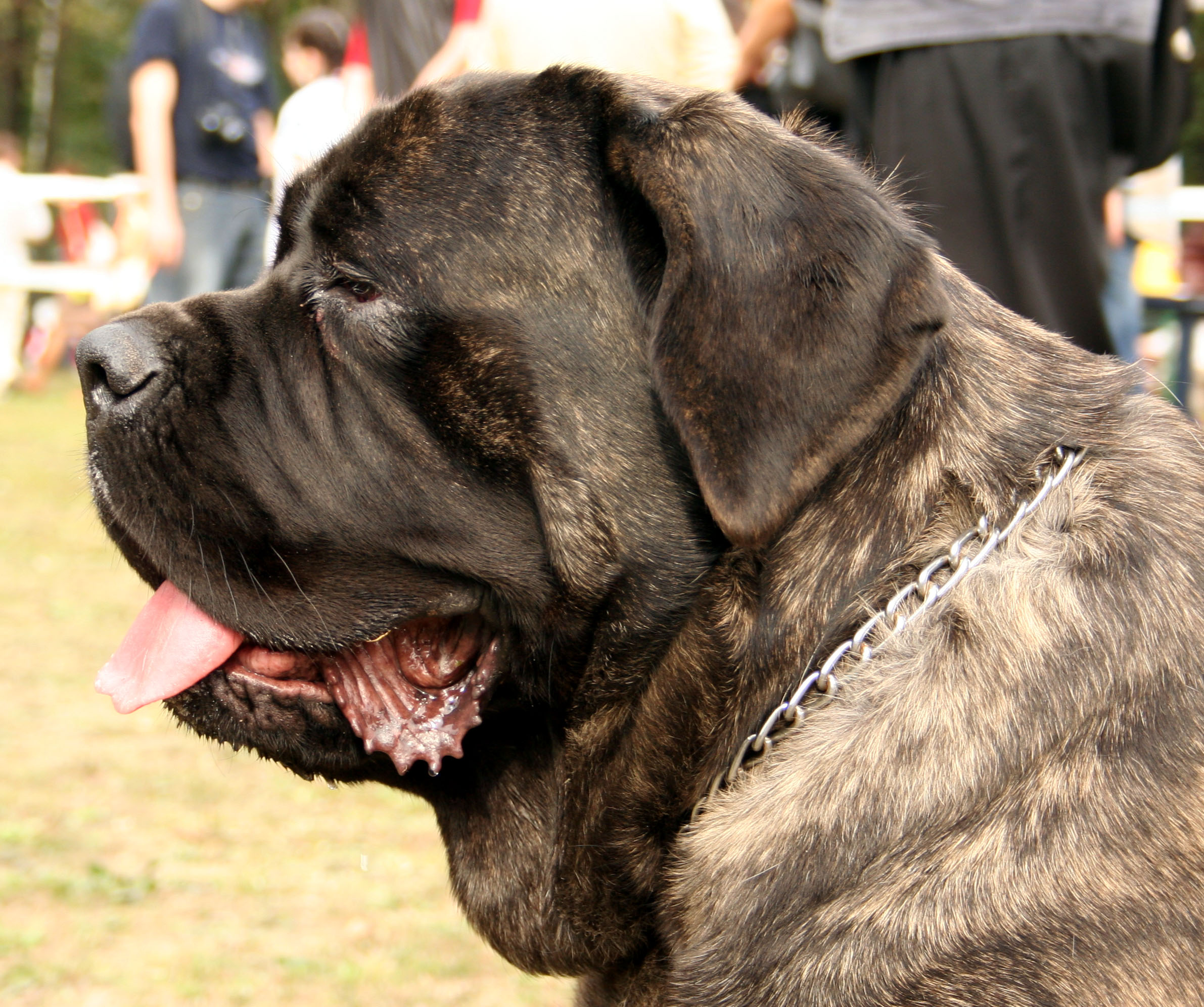
A mastiff with a dewlap, seen connecting from the neck to the lower jaw.

A dewlap is a longitudinal flap of skin or similar flesh that hangs beneath the lower jaw or neck of many vertebrates. More loosely, it can be various similar structures in the neck area, such as those caused by a double chin or the submandibular vocal sac of a frog. More generally, it can be any hanging mass of skin, such as a fold of loose skin on an elderly person's neck, or the wattle of a bird. Dewlaps can be considered as a caruncle, defined as "a small, fleshy excrescence that is a normal part of an animal's anatomy".

== Etymology ==
The word is first attested in the mid 1300s as dewelappe ("fold of skin that hangs from the throat of oxen and kine"), from lappe ("loose piece", from Old English læppa), but the first element *dew(e)- is of nebulous origin and meaning; it probably was altered by folk etymology with "dew". Old English had fræt-læppa in the aforementioned sense (and Middle English fresh-lappe). There also seems to be a cognate to Danish dialectal doglæp ("flap of skin that sweeps dew from grass, especially on the neck of an ox"), but this might be a parallel independent development. A comparison to dewclaw (also of elusive origin of prefix) has been drawn.

From the 1580s onward, it was attested to be used for the fleshy fold or wattle of a turkey, and also to a flaccid, elderly human throat.

== Mammals ==
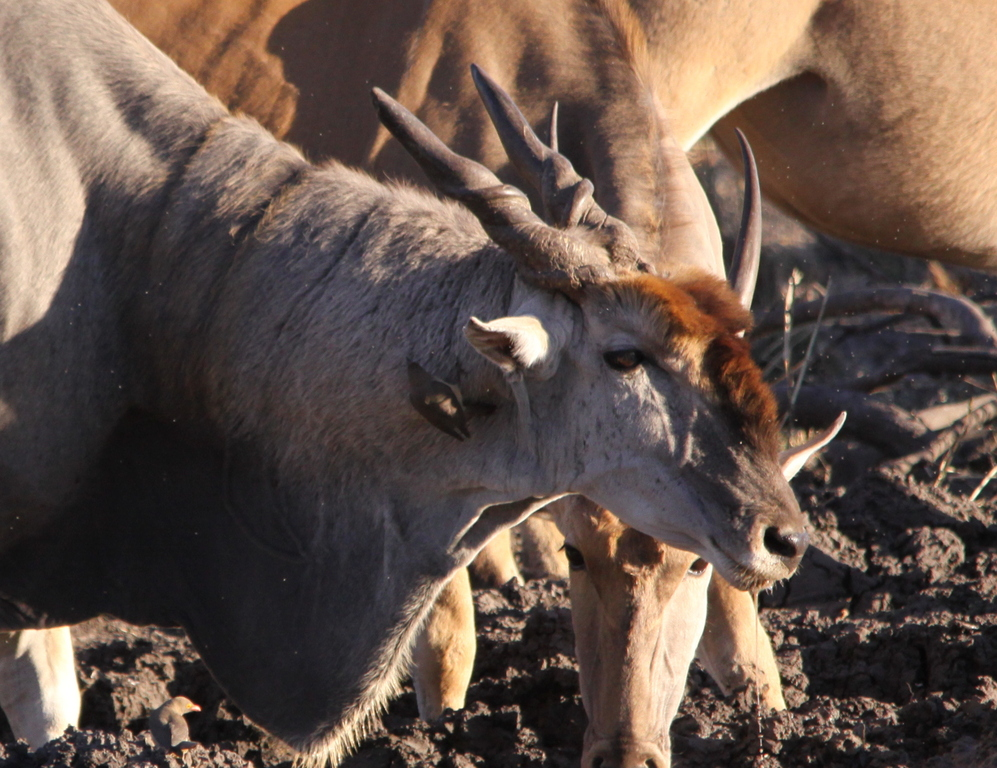
Eland in Mapungubwe National Park

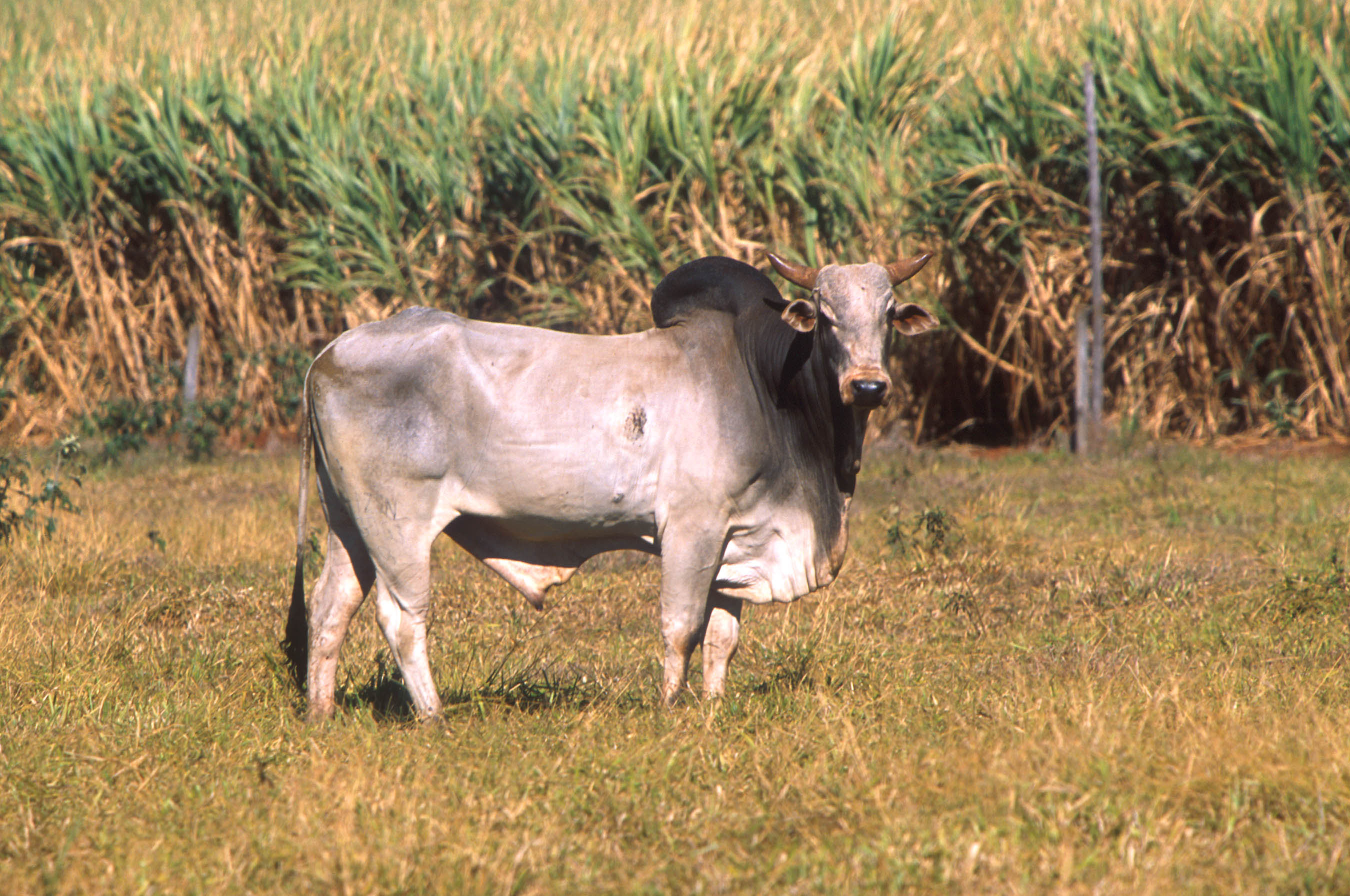
A zebu with a large dewlap.

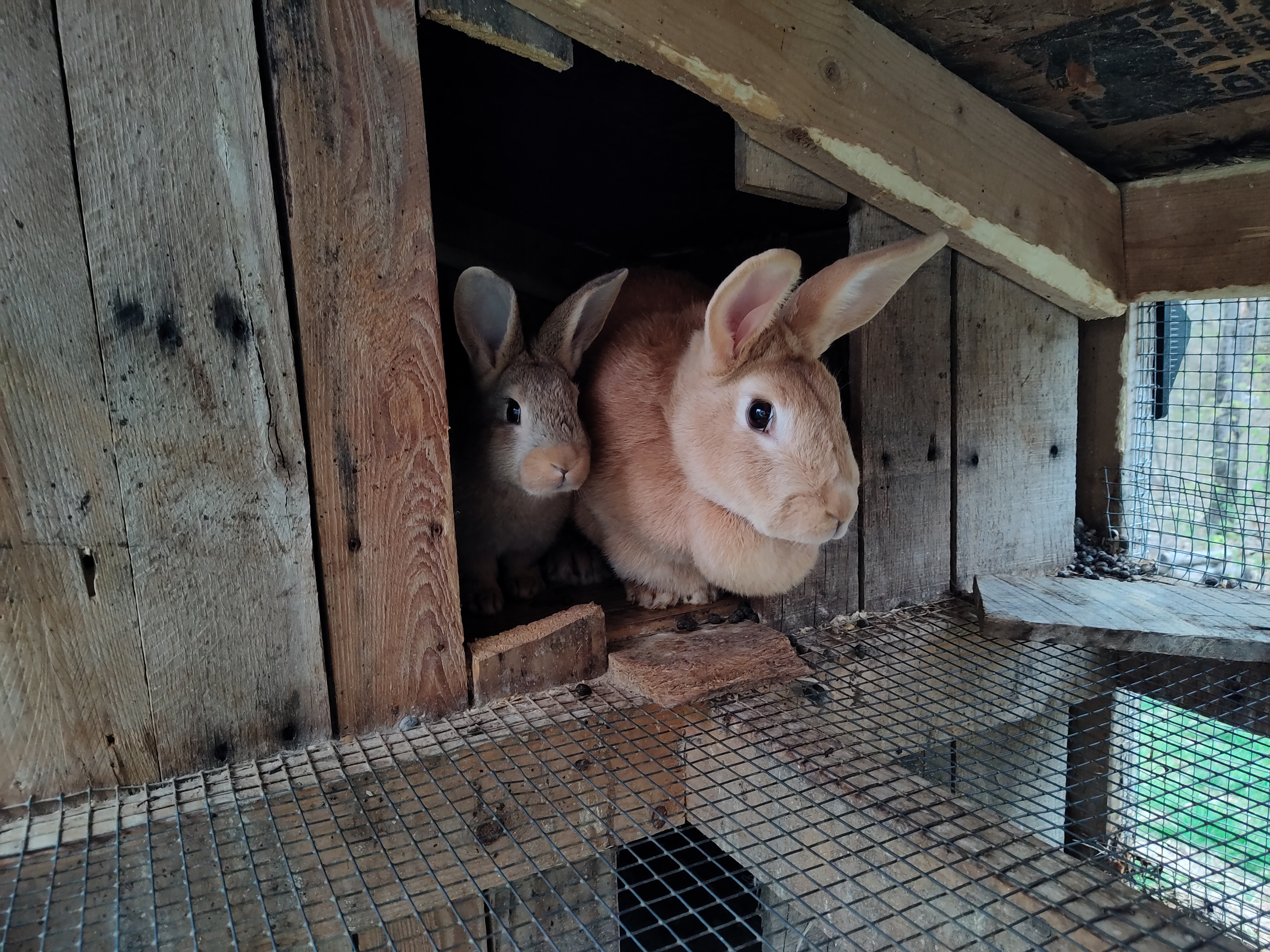
A palomino rabbit displaying her dewlap beside a month-old kit

Many mammals such as dogs, rabbits and moose possess dewlaps. The dewlap is also seen in both sexes of moose.

The giant eland and common eland both have skin flaps to aide in thermoregulation. Due to its high surface area to volume ratio, it may allow for efficient thermoregulation in larger common elands with larger dewlaps.

=== Rabbits ===
In rabbits, the dewlap is a secondary sex characteristic of female rabbits which grows once the doe reaches sexual maturity. In laboratory conditions, when a butyl alcohol extract of the urine of pregnant women was administered to male rabbits, they developed a dewlap, which then gradually disappeared once the administration ceased. If a female rabbit is ovarectomized before reaching maturity, the dewlap never develops, and even when an ovarectomy is performed on a mature female rabbit with a dewlap, the dewlap disappears gradually afterwards. Near the end of pregnancy, the female rabbit will pluck fur from the dewlap to line a nest for her young.

== Reptiles and birds ==
An anole lizard in Costa Rica repeatedly protracting and retracting its dewlap.

Many reptiles have dewlaps, sometimes called throat fans, most notably the anole family and Sitana genus of lizards, which have large skin dewlaps they can extend and retract. The anole family has been found to have enhanced vision for color and depth perception. This family is able to see dewlap coloration from a distance, giving the dewlap use and importance. These dewlaps are usually of a different color from the rest of their body and, when enlarged, make the lizard seem much bigger than it really is. The dewlap is primarily used when indicating territorial boundaries and for males to attract females during the mating season. The pigments generating this color are pterins and carotenoids. These two pigments are the most easily seen through the anole's eyes. Pterin and carotenoid pigments are located throughout the tissue of the dewlap, creating yellow and red hues. Lizards usually accompany dewlap movement with head bobs and other displays. The dewlap moves through extension and contraction. The muscles creating this movement are the ceratohyoid muscles and are connected to the hyoid apparatus in the throat and larynx area. Though the purpose of these displays is unclear, the colors of the dewlap and the movements during the displays are thought to be a way of standing out against visual background noise.

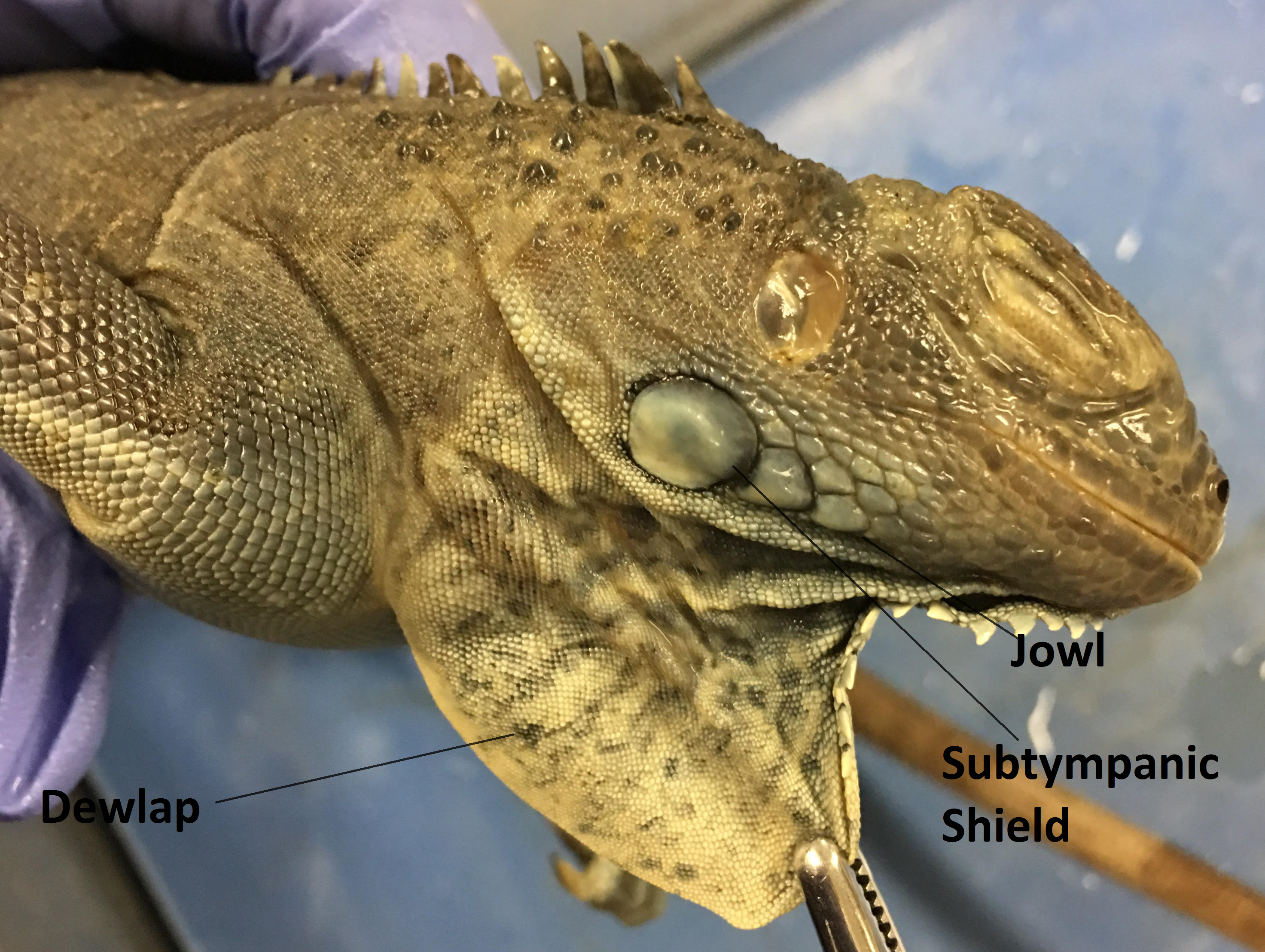
An iguana with an extended dewlap.

Many birds also have dewlaps, including domestic chickens, some cracids and some guans.

== See also ==
- Crest
- Double chin
- Neck frill
- Wattle
