= Sitana laticeps =

Conservation status
- Least Concern (IUCN 3.1)

Scientific classification
- Kingdom: Animalia
- Phylum: Chordata
- Order: Squamata
- Suborder: Iguania
- Family: Agamidae
- Genus: Sitana
- Species: S. laticeps

Binomial name
- Sitana laticeps Deepak & Giri, 2016

Species of lizard

Sitana laticeps, the broad-headed fan-throated lizard, is a species of agamid lizard. It is endemic to India.
