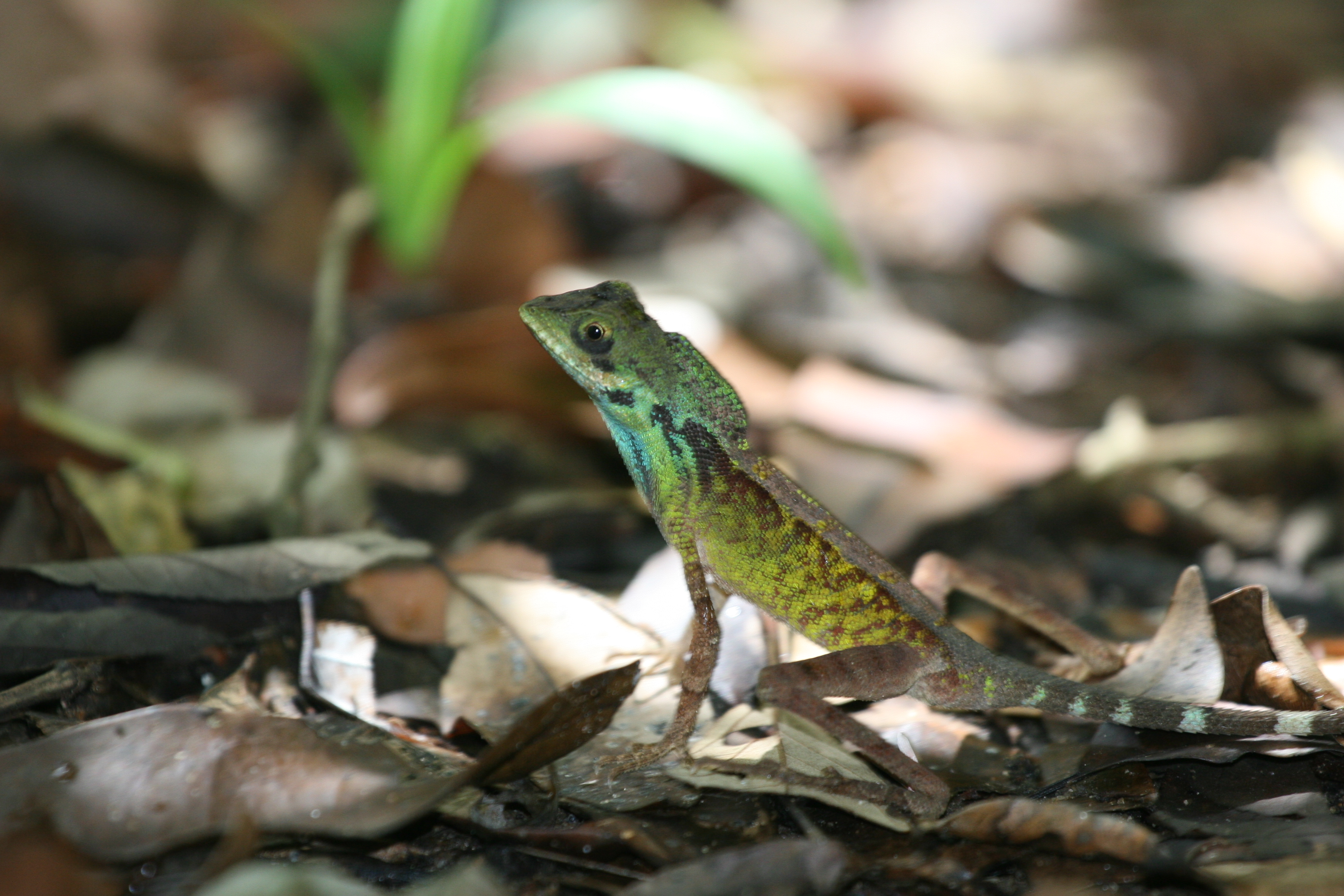
- At Kaludiya Pokuna, Kandalama, Sri Lanka.

Scientific classification
- Kingdom: Animalia
- Phylum: Chordata
- Class: Reptilia
- Order: Squamata
- Suborder: Iguania
- Family: Agamidae
- Genus: Otocryptis
- Species: O. nigristigma

Binomial name
- Otocryptis nigristigma Bahir & Silva, 2005

= Otocryptis nigristigma =

Black-spotted kangaroo lizard

Species of lizard

The black-spotted kangaroo lizard or black-patched kangaroo lizard (Otocryptis nigristigma), is a small, ground dwelling agamid lizard endemic to Sri Lanka.In Sinhalese, language it is known as "Pahatharata Pinum Katussa - පහතරට පිනුම් කටුස්සා" and "Viyali Pinum Katussa - වියළි පිනුම් කටුස්සා"
