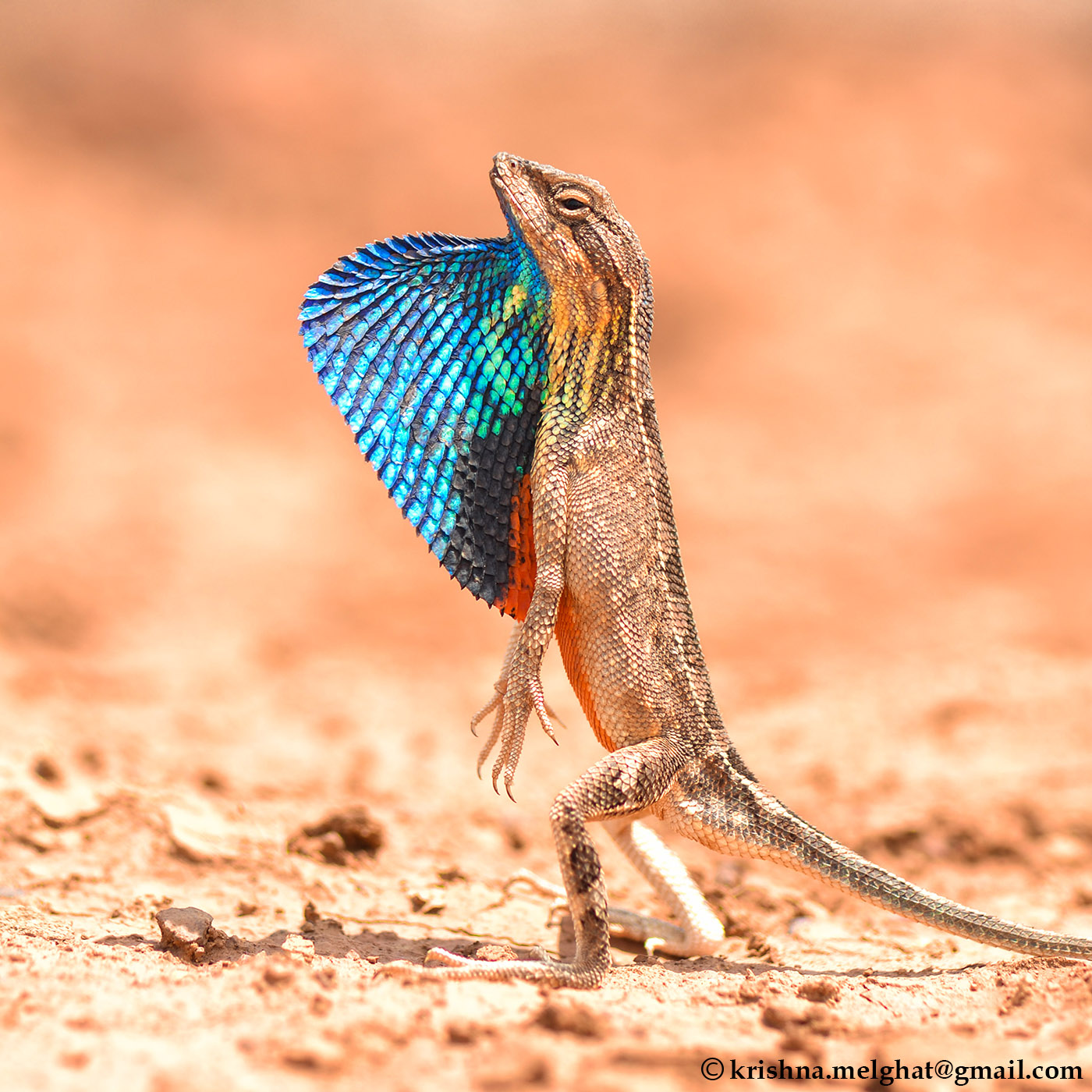
- Sarada superba adult male.

Scientific classification
- Kingdom: Animalia
- Phylum: Chordata
- Class: Reptilia
- Order: Squamata
- Suborder: Iguania
- Family: Agamidae
- Subfamily: Draconinae
- Genus: Sarada; Deepak, Karanth and Giri, 2016

Type species
- Sitana deccanensis Jerdon, 1870

= Sarada (lizard) =

Genus of lizards

Sarada is a genus of lizards in the family Agamidae. The common name large fan-throated lizards has been coined for this genus. It is the sister genus of Sitana; together they form a group known as the fan-throated lizards. The genus, consisting of three species, was erected in 2016 on the basis of molecular phylogenetic studies from across peninsular India.

The scientific name Sarada finds its origin in a Marathi word (सरडा IAST: saraḍā) used to refer to Agamidae. All known members of this genus are restricted to two Indian states, Maharashtra and northern parts of Karnataka.

== Species ==
The three species are listed here alphabetically:

- Sarada darwini Deepak, Karanth, Dutta and Giri, 2016 – Darwin's large fan-throated lizard
- Sarada deccanensis (Jerdon, 1870) – Deccan fan-throated lizard
- Sarada superba Deepak, Zambre, Bhosale and Giri, 2016 – superb large fan-throated lizard
