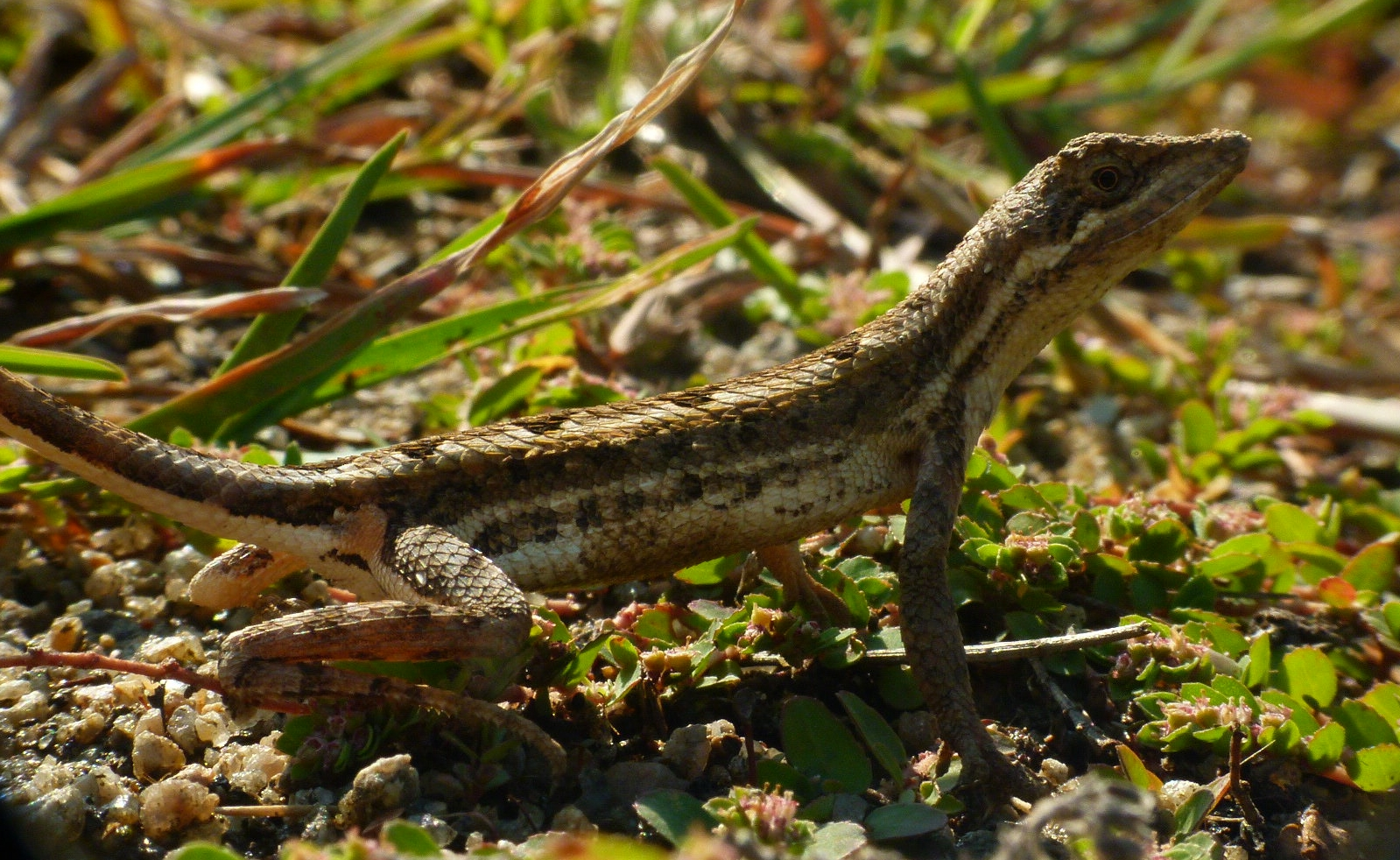

Conservation status
- Least Concern (IUCN 3.1)

Scientific classification
- Kingdom: Animalia
- Phylum: Chordata
- Class: Reptilia
- Order: Squamata
- Suborder: Iguania
- Family: Agamidae
- Genus: Sitana
- Species: S. ponticeriana

Binomial name
- Sitana ponticeriana Cuvier, 1829
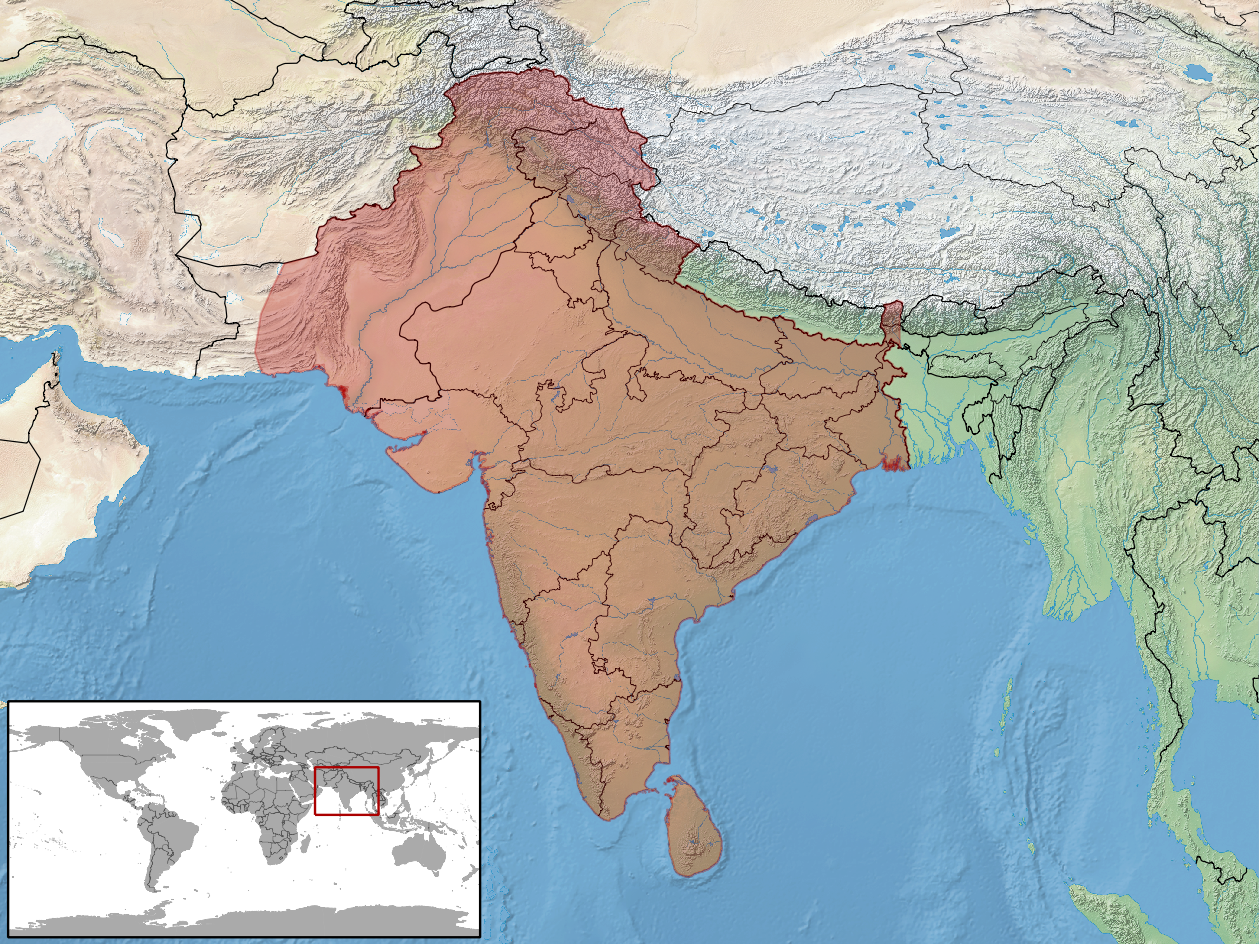

= Sitana ponticeriana =

Species of lizard

Sitana ponticeriana, the Pondichéry fan-throated lizard, is a species of agamid lizard found in eastern peninsular India. It was earlier thought to be widespread but studies in 2016 resulted in the splitting of the group into several species placed in two genera. The genus Sitana has an enlarged projecting scale on the posterior side of the hind thigh which is absent in the sister genus Sarada.

The species is found mostly on the ground in open ground patches in thin forests. When disturbed this lizard sometimes runs with a bipedal gait.

== Descriptions ==
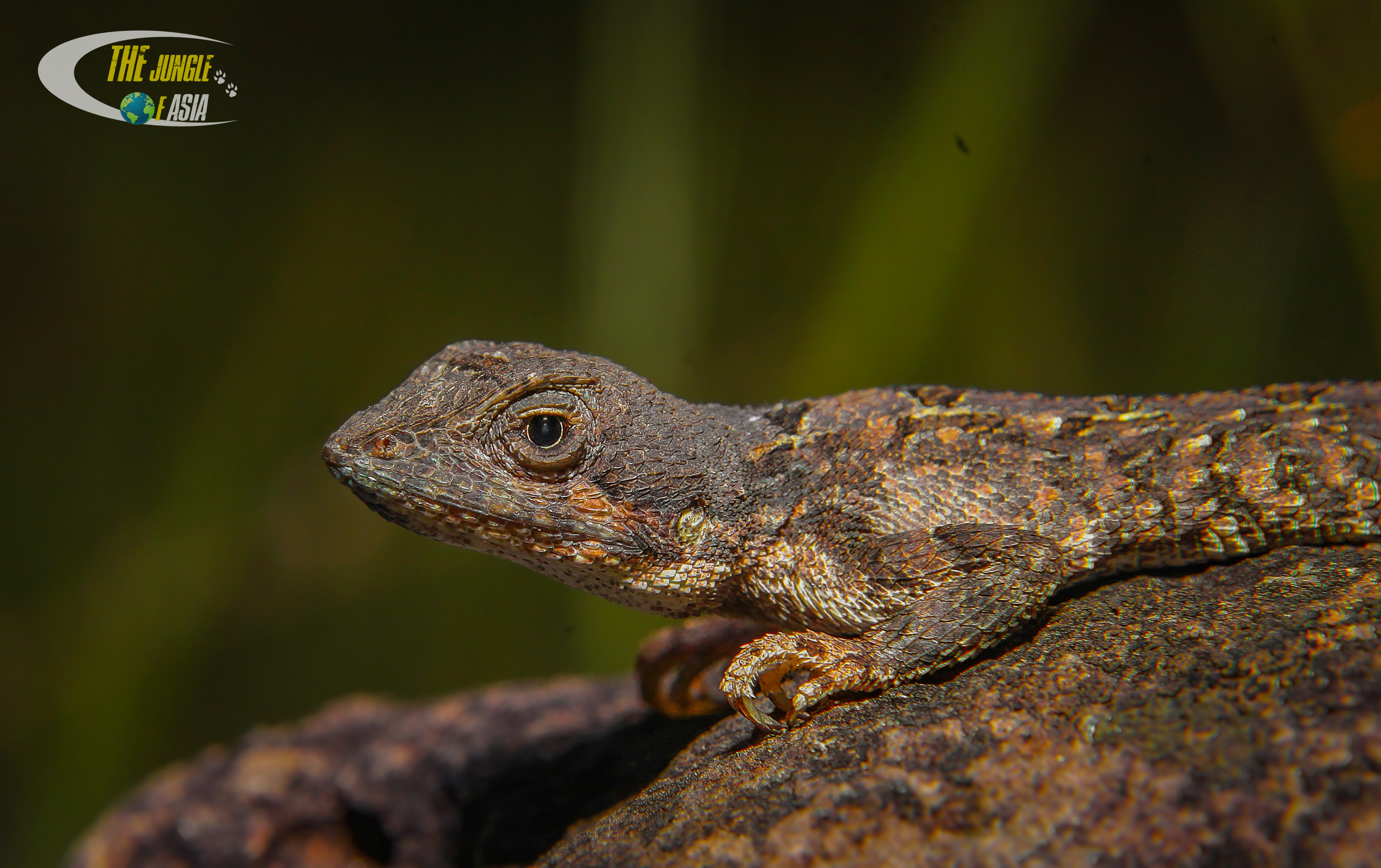
A specimen of Sitana ponticeriana found in Lonand, Maharashtra

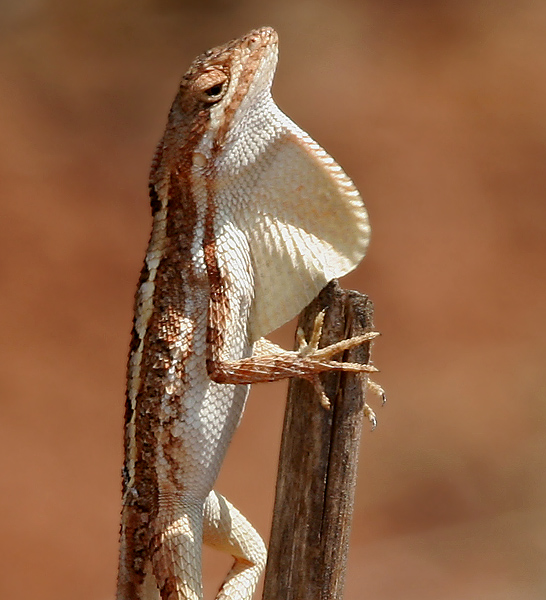
in Hyderabad, India

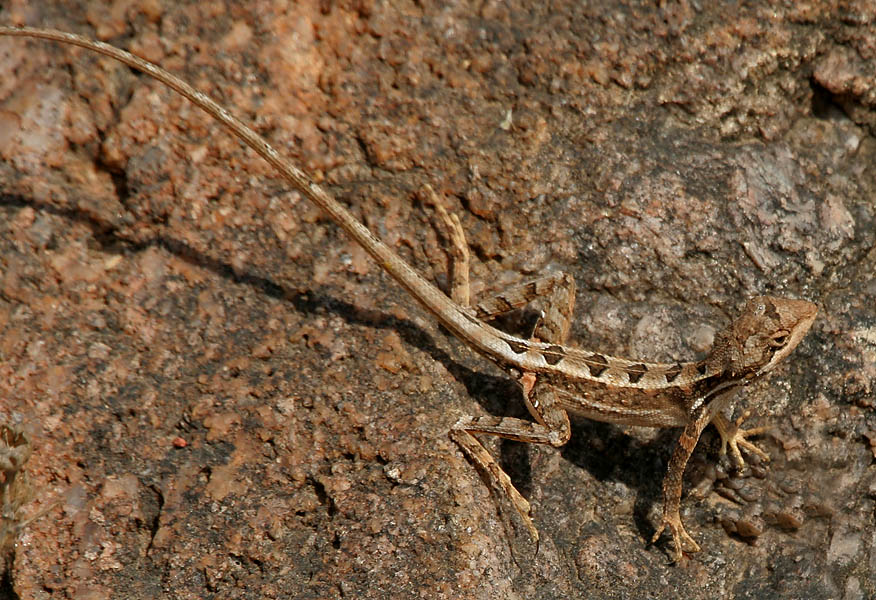
in Hyderabad

Upper head-scales small, sharply keeled; canthus rostralis and supraciliary edge sharp, with much enlarged scales. Dorsal scales larger than ventrals, with sharp keels forming straight longitudinal lines; lateral scales smallest, uniform or intermixed with scattered enlarged ones. The fore limb does not extend on to the vent, if laid backwards; the hind limb reaches to the orbit, if laid forwards; the lower thigh is rather shorter than the foot (measured from the heel to the tip of the longest toe), the length of which is only three-fourths of the distance between the shoulder and hip joints. Limbs above with uniform strongly keeled scales. The length of the limbs varies very much: in some specimens the hind limb stretched forwards does not extend beyond the orbit, in others it reaches the end of the snout or even considerably beyond. Brown, with a series of dark spots along the middle of the back, the spot on the neck being the darkest; a whitish band along each side of the back. The gular (throat) appendage is tricolored— black, blue, and red.

Tail round, slender, once and a half to twice as long as the head and body, covered with equal keeled scales. Olive-brown above, with a series of rhomboidal spots along the middle of the back; a more or less distinct light band along each side of the back. Dewlap color in this species is very variable. Typically the gular appendage is tricoloured— black, blue, and red; It is more developed in the breeding-season, and in the majority of individuals, at all events, is not coloured at other times. Males are typically distinguished as coloured-fanned, intermediate-fanned, and white-fanned.

This species attains a maximum length of 8 inches (200 mm), of which the tail makes 5 inches (130 mm). From snout to vent 3–5 inches (76–127 mm). Ebanasar (1989) reported the histomorphology of thyroid gland and thyroid activity in Sitana ponticeriana in juveniles, males and females with different ovary maturation stages. He has also reported ovoviviparity in females from Madurai and Virudhunagar areas of Tamil Nadu.

M. A. Smith noted that there were variants with intermediates that were separated in 2016. Jerdon had described a form from near Bombay called deccanensis which is now included in the genus Sarada.

The diet of Sitana ponticeriana is mostly insects, and the most common types were Formicidae, Lepidopteran larvae, and Termitidae, with all of these found in 80% or more of the stomachs of Sitana ponticeriana.

== Distribution ==
This species occurs in eastern parts of peninsular India, along the Coromandel Coast. It may be distributed in parts of Sri Lanka.

Researchers discovered a new species of colourful fan-throated lizard from the coastal areas of Thiruvananthapuram. This new species belongs to the genus Sitana, and has been named Sitana attenboroughii after David Attenborough, veteran broadcaster and naturalist, and Sitana marudhamneydhal.

== Reproductive Behavior ==
Breeding in Sitana ponticeriana occurs during the warmer months, where males engage in an impressive mating display to attract females and ward off rivals. They extend their colorful throat fan (dewlap), bob their heads, and chase competitors. After successful mating, females dig small holes in soft soil to lay their eggs, leaving them in the nest to hatch after a few weeks.

== Ecological Importance ==
The Fan-Throated Lizard plays a crucial role in maintaining the balance of ecosystems like grasslands and scrublands. One of its key contributions is insect control, as it feeds on ants, beetles, and other small insects. By managing insect populations, the lizard prevents them from overwhelming plant life, ensuring the health and stability of these habitats.

Additionally, the lizard contributes to soil health. When it digs small holes to lay its eggs, it helps aerate the soil, allowing water and nutrients to penetrate more easily to plant roots. This process supports overall plant growth and soil quality, further promoting a balanced ecosystem.

In the food chain, the Fan-Throated Lizard acts both as prey and predator. It is a food source for various birds, snakes, and larger reptiles, making it an important link in predator-prey dynamics. On the other hand, by feeding on insects, it keeps their populations in check, preventing potential pest outbreaks.
