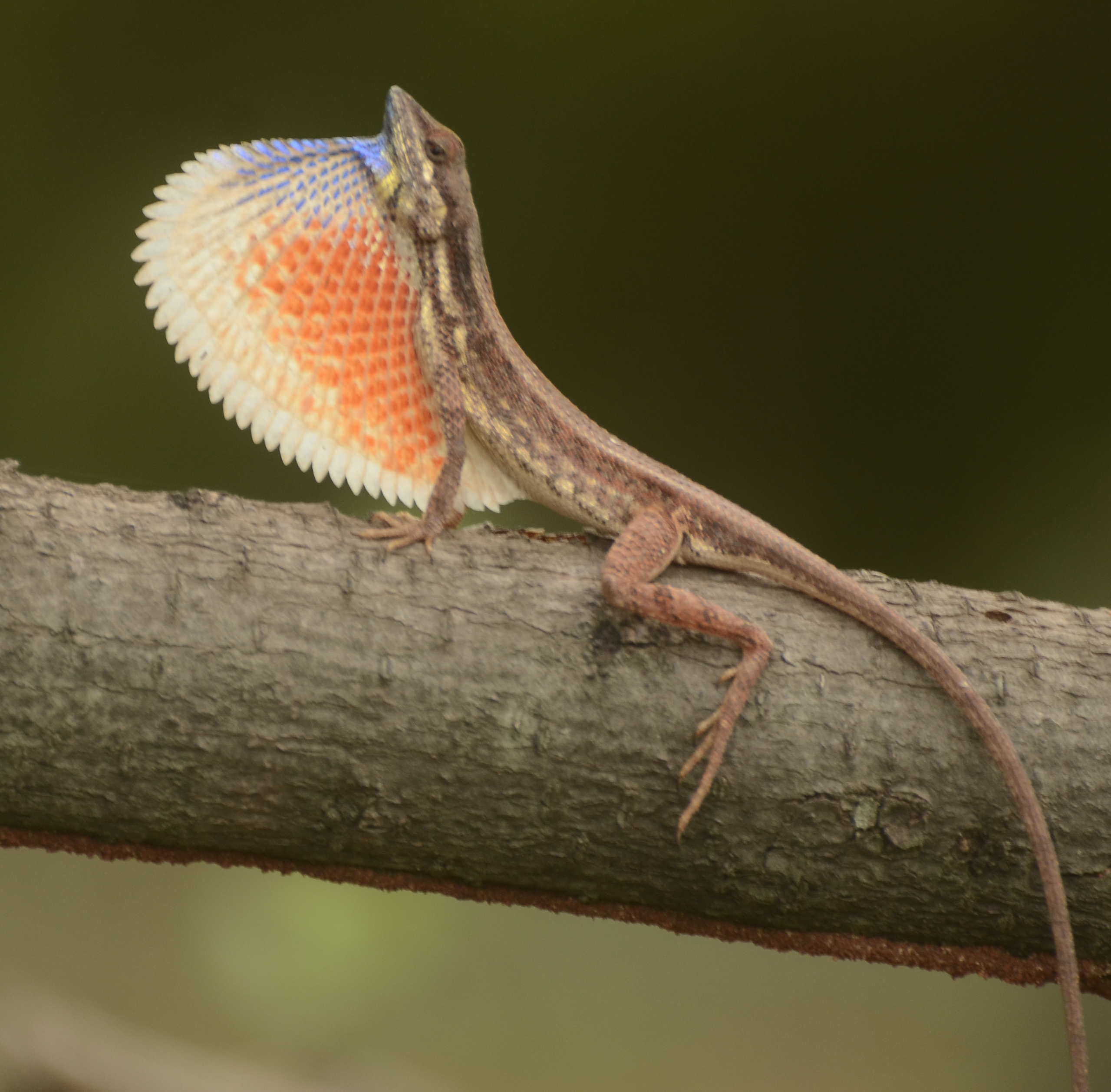
- Sitana ponticeriana, the type species

Scientific classification
- Kingdom: Animalia
- Phylum: Chordata
- Class: Reptilia
- Order: Squamata
- Suborder: Iguania
- Family: Agamidae
- Subfamily: Draconinae
- Genus: Sitana; G. Cuvier, 1829

Type species
- Sitana ponticeriana Cuvier, 1829

= Sitana =

Genus of lizards

Sitana is a genus of lizards, collectively known as the fan-throated lizards, in the family Agamidae. They are found in Nepal, India, Sri Lanka, and Pakistan. The genus comprises fourteen species, including several recently discovered ones, two of which are from Sri Lanka. In 2016, a new genus named Sarada was erected, consisting of one former Sitana species and two newly described ones. Sarada is the sister genus of Sitana. Together they form a clade whose sister group is Otocryptis.

== Description ==
Sitana is genus of small to medium-sized lizards. They are ground dwellers, primarily eating insects but also mollusks and seeds.

Males measure 37–47 mm (1.5–1.9 in) in snout–vent length, and females measure 36–52 mm (1.4–2.0 in). In an example of convergent evolution, males have prominent dewlaps, similar to anoles, which they use in communication during the breeding season. The dewlap varies in size, from small to large, depending on the species. Females lack the dewlap.

== Species ==
There are fifteen species that are listed here alphabetically:

Image	Scientific name	Common name	Distribution
	Sitana bahiri Amarasinghe, Ineich & Karunarathna, 2015	Bahir's fan-throated lizard	Sri Lanka
	Sitana devakai Amarasinghe, Ineich & Karunaratna, 2014	Devaka's fan-throated lizard	Sri Lanka, Tamil Nadu of India,
	Sitana dharwarensis Ambekar, Murthy, & Mirza 2020		India
	Sitana fusca Schleich & Kästle, 1998	dark sitana	Nepal.
	Sitana gokakensis Deepak, Khandekar, Chaitanya, & Karanth, 2018	Gokak fan-throated lizard	India.
	Sitana kalesari Bahuguna, 2015		India.
	Sitana laticeps Deepak and Giri, 2016	broad-headed fan-throated lizard	India.
	Sitana marudhamneydhal Deepak, Khandekar, Varma & Chaitanya, 2016		India
	Sitana ponticeriana Cuvier, 1829	Pondichéry fan-throated lizard	India
	Sitana schleichi Anders & Kästle, 2002	Suklaphantah sitana	Nepal.
	Sitana sivalensis Schleich, Kästle & Shah, 1998; endemic to Nepal	Siwalik sitana	Nepal.
	Sitana spinaecephalus Deepak, Vyas and Giri, 2016	spiny-headed fan-throated lizard	India
	Sitana sushili Deepak, Tillack, Kar, Sarkar, & Mohapatra, 2021	Sushil's fan-throated lizard	India
	Sitana thondalu Deepak, Khandekar, Chaitanya, & Karanth, 2018	Nagarjuna Sagar fan-throated lizard	India
	Sitana visiri Deepak, 2016	palm leaf fan-throated lizard	India
