= Beddome =

Beddome may refer to:

== Animals ==
- Beddome's day gecko, a species of gecko, a lizard in the family Gekkonidae
- Eutropis beddomei (also Beddome's skink), a species of skink endemic to India and Sri Lanka
- Ophisops beddomei (also Beddome's snake-eye), a species of lizard in the family Lacertidae

=== Frogs ===
- Indirana beddomii (also Beddome's leaping frog), a species of frog found in the Western Ghats
- Nyctibatrachus beddomii (also Beddome's night frog), a species of frog in the family Nyctibatrachidae
- Raorchestes beddomii (also Beddome's bubble-nest frog), a species of frog in the family Rhacophoridae

=== Snakes ===
- Beddome's coral snake, a species of venomous snake in the family Elapidae
- Beddome's worm snake, a species of harmless blind snake in the family Gerrhopilidae
- Boiga beddomei (also Beddome's cat snake), a species of rear-fanged snake in the family Colubridae
- Uropeltis beddomii (also Beddome's earth snake), a species of snake in the family Uropeltidae

== People ==
- Benjamin Beddome (1717–1795), English Particular Baptist minister and hymn writer
- Henry Septimus Beddome (1830–1881), English-Canadian physician and a Hudson's Bay Company employee
- James Beddome (born 1983), Canadian politician
- Richard Henry Beddome (1830–1911), British military officer and naturalist
