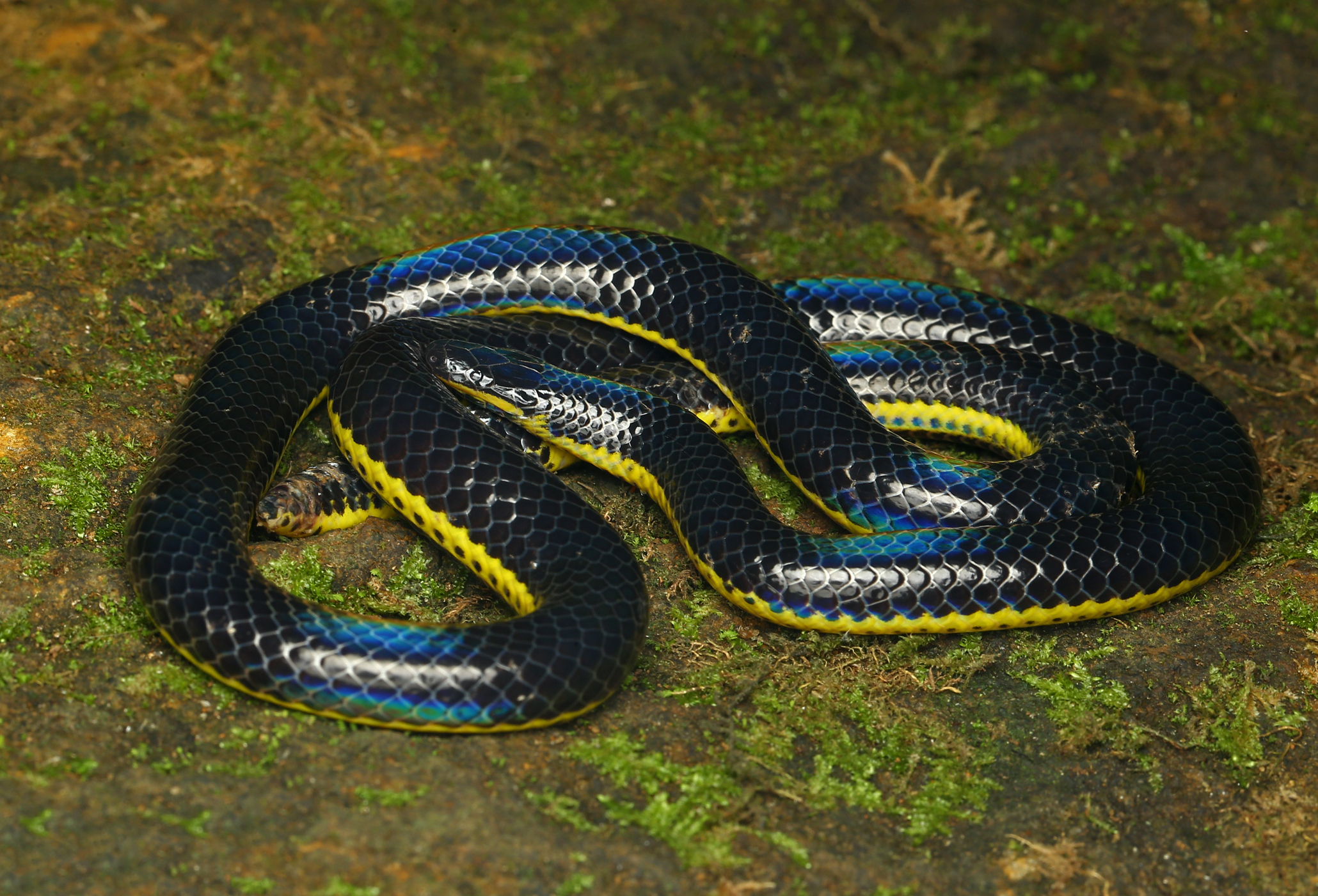
- One of the first photographs of this species taken in the wild.

Scientific classification
- Kingdom: Animalia
- Phylum: Chordata
- Class: Reptilia
- Order: Squamata
- Suborder: Serpentes
- Family: Uropeltidae
- Genus: Melanophidium
- Species: M. bilineatum

Binomial name
- Melanophidium bilineatum Beddome, 1870
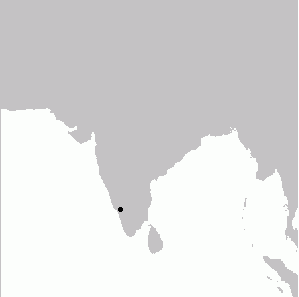

= Melanophidium bilineatum =

Species of snake

Melanophidium bilineatum, commonly known as the two-lined black shield-tail snake or iridescent shield-tail snake, is a species of snake endemic to India. This species was known from only three specimens and very little information is available of it in the wild.

== Geographic range ==
It is found in Wayanad, Kannur, Malappuram districts of Kerala which is situated in the Western Ghats in southern India. The species was described from the specimens obtained by Richard Henry Beddome from near the summit of the Periya peak in Wayanad, at an elevation of about 5,000 feet and also at a similar elevation on the Tirrhioot peak (West of Manatoddy according to M. A. Smith 1943).

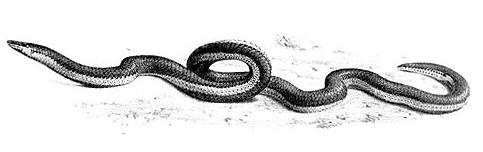
Illustration published in the Proceedings of the Zoological Society, 1875.

== Description ==
The diameter of eye one-fourth the length of the ocular shield, and the ventrals a little broader, twice as broad as the adjacent scales: ventrals 188–200; caudals 15–17. Tail as in the young of Melanophidium punctatum. Iridescent black above and below; the two colours separated by a broad, yellow stripe along scale row 2 and the adjacent halves of rows 1 and 3; it may or may not have a series of small black dots.
