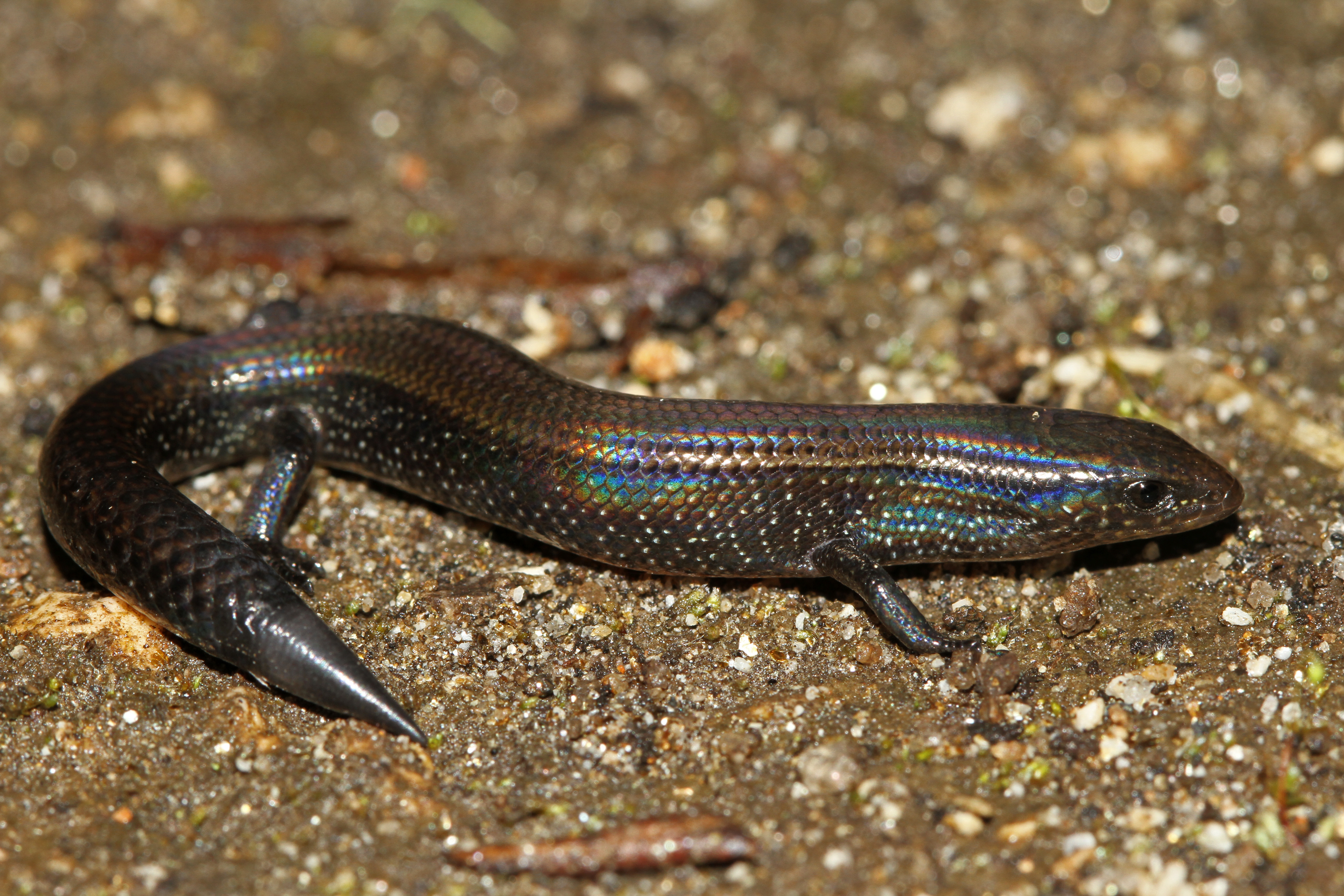

Conservation status
- Near Threatened (IUCN 3.1)

Scientific classification
- Domain: Eukaryota
- Kingdom: Animalia
- Phylum: Chordata
- Class: Reptilia
- Order: Squamata
- Family: Scincidae
- Genus: Ristella
- Species: R. rurkii

Binomial name
- Ristella rurkii Gray, 1839
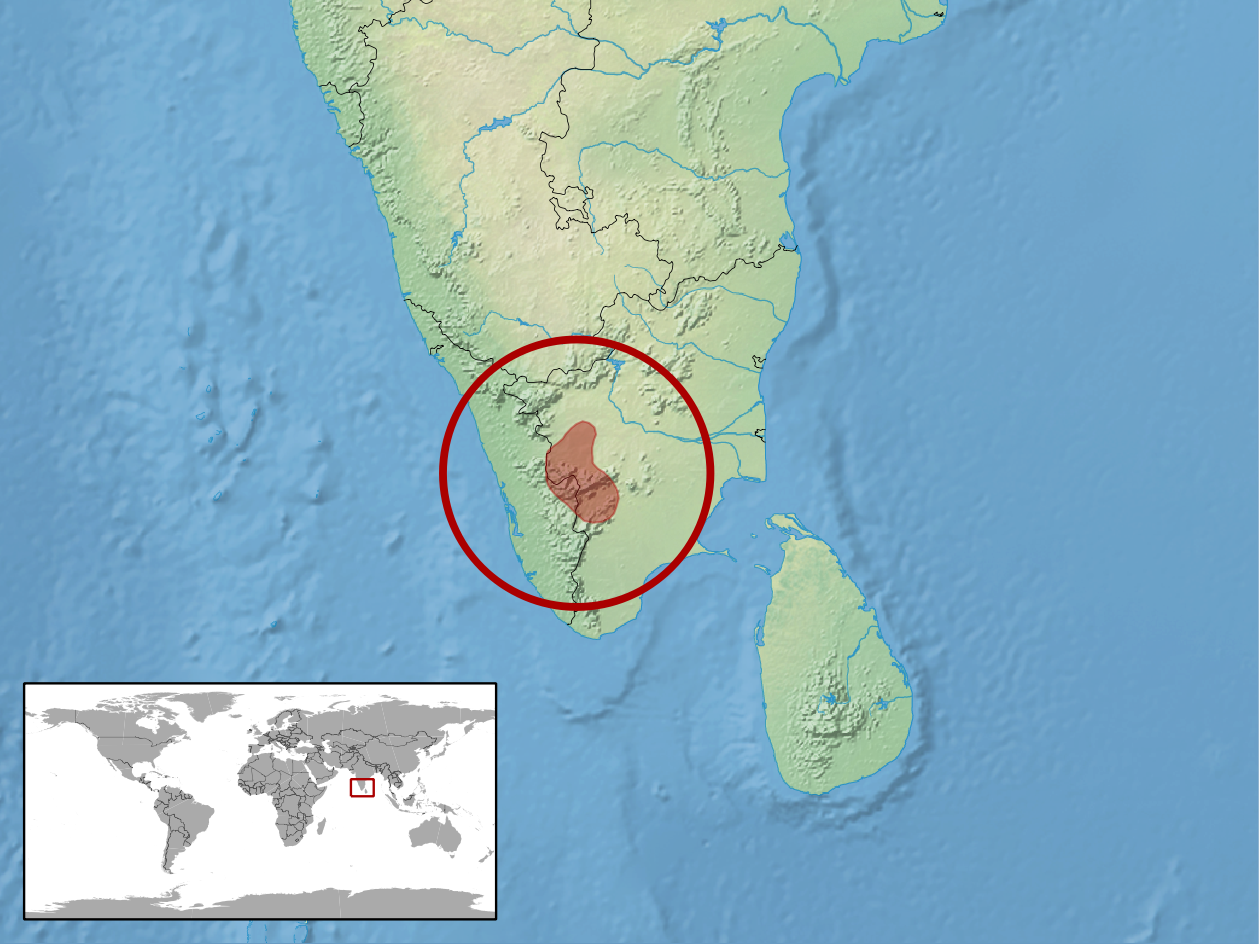

Synonyms
- Ristella rurkii Gray, 1839; Ateuchosaurus travancoricus Beddome, 1870 (part); Ristella malabarica Stoliczka, 1871; Ristella rurki [sic] — M.A. Smith, 1935; Ristella rurkii — Das, 1996

= Ristella rurkii =

Species of reptile

Ristella rurkii, commonly known as Rurk's ristella, is a species of skink endemic to the Western Ghats of southern India. It is a small, insectivorous, diurnal skink found in shola grasslands and rainforests of hills ranges in parts of Tamil Nadu and Kerala states of India.

== Etymology ==
The specific name, rurkii, is in honor of "Dr. Rurk" who collected the type specimen.

== Geographic range ==
R. rurkii is found in South India, in the Anaimalai Hills, High Ranges, Travancore, and the Palni Hills, of Tamil Nadu and Kerala. It is endemic to rainforests south of Palghat Gap.
