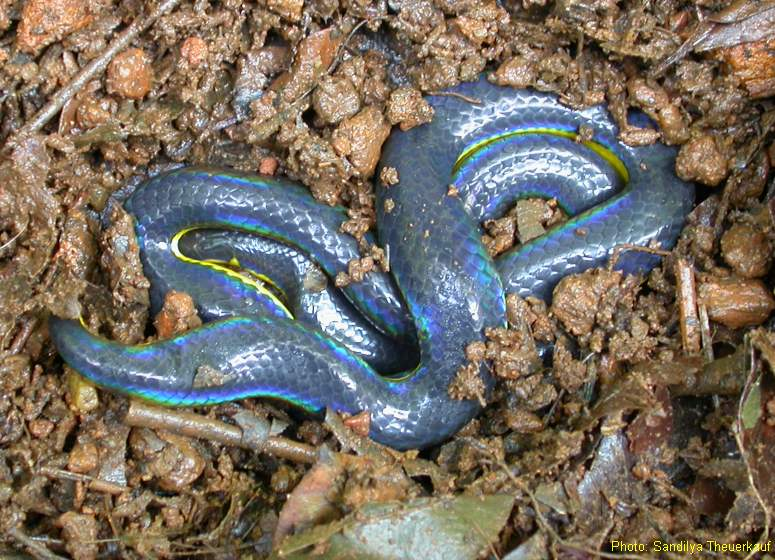
- iridescent shieldtail, M. bilineatum

Scientific classification
- Domain: Eukaryota
- Kingdom: Animalia
- Phylum: Chordata
- Class: Reptilia
- Order: Squamata
- Suborder: Serpentes
- Family: Uropeltidae
- Genus: Melanophidium; Günther, 1864

= Melanophidium =

Genus of snakes

Common name: Black shield-tail snakes

Melanophidium is a genus of nonvenomous shield-tail snakes endemic to the Western Ghats of India. These species are identifiable by having a mental groove in their chin shields. Currently, four species are recognized, including one newly described species.

== Natural history ==
Their very smooth and glossy skin is said to be highly iridescent and is functional in warding off debris during burrowing. They are typically fossorial and nocturnal, becoming active during rainy nights.

== Geographic range ==
Found in India in the Western Ghats: from Tirunelveli Hills in Tamil Nadu, at the southern tip of the country, northwards up to the Amboli Hills in Maharashtra.

== Species ==
Species	Taxon author	Common name	Geographic range
Melanophidium bilineatum	Beddome, 1870	Two-lined black shield-tail snake	Wayanad hills in the Western Ghats: in Peria and Tirhoot Peaks west of Manantoddy
Melanophidium punctatum	Beddome, 1871	Spotted black shield-tail snake	Southern Western Ghats: in Travancore (900–1500 m elevation) and the Anamalai Hills south of the Palghat Gap.
Melanophidium wynaudense^{T}	(Beddome, 1863)	Wayanad black shield-tail snake	Central Western Ghats: from Wayanad to the Manantoddy District, Coorg up to the Agumbe Ghats, at 900–1500 m elevation
Melanophidium khairei	Gower, Giri, Captain & Wilkinson, 2016	Khaire's black shield-tail snake	Western India in the Northern Western Ghats of Goa and Maharashtra States

^{T}) Type species
