= Ristella travancorica =

Conservation status
- Data Deficient (IUCN 3.1)

Scientific classification
- Kingdom: Animalia
- Phylum: Chordata
- Class: Reptilia
- Order: Squamata
- Family: Scincidae
- Genus: Ristella
- Species: R. travancorica

Binomial name
- Ristella travancorica (Beddome, 1870)

Synonyms
- Ateuchosaurus travancoricus Beddome, 1870 (part); Ristella travancorica — Beddome, 1871 (part); Ristella travancorica — Boulenger, 1890; Ristella travancoricus — Das, 1996

Species of lizard

Ristella travancorica, commonly known as the Travancore cat skink or the Travancore ristella, is a species of skink endemic to the Western Ghats in India.

== Description ==
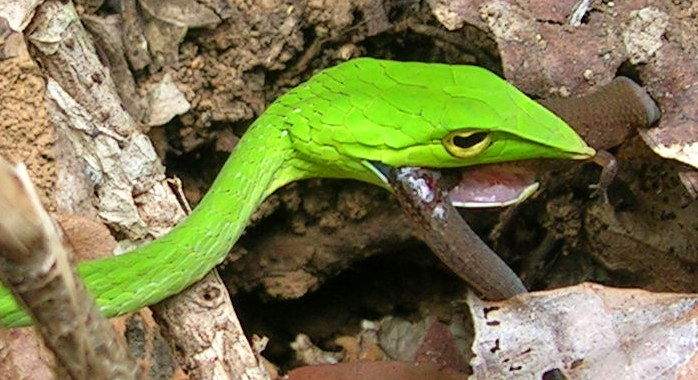
Ahaetulla nasuta preying on Ristella.

Ear-opening not or but slightly larger than the nostril; third to sixth upper labials below the eye. Dorsal scales sharply bicarinate; 24, rarely 26, scales round the middle of the body. Otherwise as in R. rurkii. Reddish brown above, each dorsal scale usually with a dark brown dot; usually a rather indistinct darker lateral band; lower surfaces uniform whitish. From snout to vent 1.5 in (3.8 cm).

== Geographic range ==
R. travancorica is found in India, in the Western Ghats, in the Ponmudi Hills (western Tamil Nadu state), and the Tirunelveli Hills (Kerala state).

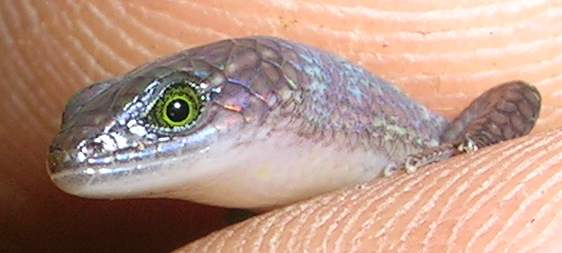
Head of beddomes cat skink.

== Reproduction ==
This species is oviparous. Egg laying coincides with the southwestern monsoons. Adult females lay clutches of 2 eggs under dead leaves and rocks. Each egg measures 11 mm (0.43 in) x 5–6 mm (0.20–0.24 in).
