= Beddome's frog =

Beddome's frog may refer to:

- Beddome's bubble-nest frog (Raorchestes beddomii), a species of frog in the family Rhacophoridae endemic to southern Western Ghats of southwestern India in Kerala and Tamil Nadu
- Beddome's leaping frog (Indirana beddomii), a frog in the family Ranixalidae found in the Western Ghats of India
- Beddome's night frog (Nyctibatrachus beddomii), a frog in the family Nyctibatrachidae, endemic to the forests of the Western Ghats of India
