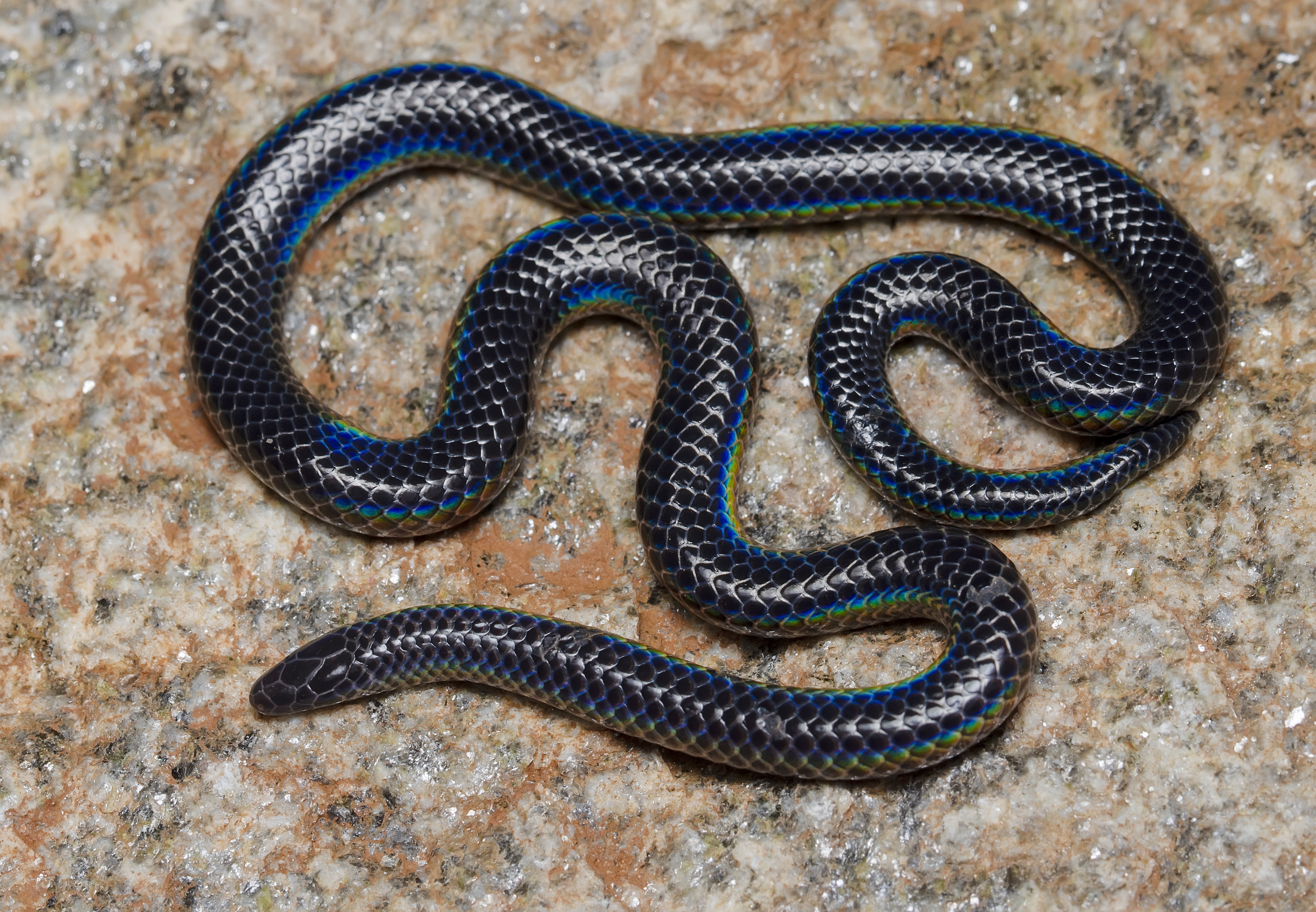

Conservation status
- Least Concern (IUCN 3.1)

Scientific classification
- Kingdom: Animalia
- Phylum: Chordata
- Class: Reptilia
- Order: Squamata
- Suborder: Serpentes
- Family: Uropeltidae
- Genus: Melanophidium
- Species: M. wynaudense

Binomial name
- Melanophidium wynaudense (Beddome, 1863)

Synonyms
- Plectrurus wynaudensis Beddome, 1863; Plectrurus wynandensis [sic] Beddome, 1863 (ex errore); Melanophidium wynandense — Günther, 1864; Melanophidium wynadense [sic] Boulenger, 1893 (ex errore); Melanophidium wynaudense — M.A. Smith, 1943; Melanophidium wyandense [sic] E.E. Williams, 1959 (ex errore); Melanophidium wynaudense — McDiarmid et al., 1999

= Melanophidium wynaudense =

Species of snake

Melanophidium wynaudense, commonly known as the Indian black earth snake, is a species of snake in the family Uropeltidae. The species is endemic to India.

== Geographic range ==
M. wynaudense is found in the Western Ghats of southern India.

Type locality: "Cherambady in the Wynaud [= Wayanad]".

== Description ==
Beddome (1864: 180) described M. wynaudense as follows:

"Scales round the body 15, round the neck 16 or 17; rostral scarcely produced back between the nasals; no supraorbital; muzzle more obtuse than in P. perrotteti; eye small; subcaudals 11 pairs; anal large, bifid; tail compressed; scales smooth, terminal spinose, tail ending in a single horny point.

Colour bluish black, with broad white blotches on the belly, which become larger and more numerous towards the tail; tail uniform bluish black."
