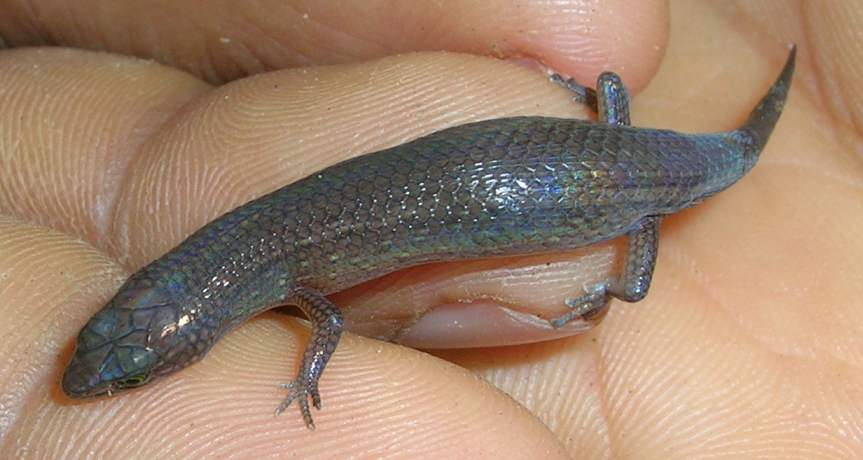
- Ristella travancorica from the Western Ghats.

Scientific classification
- Kingdom: Animalia
- Phylum: Chordata
- Class: Reptilia
- Order: Squamata
- Family: Scincidae
- Subfamily: Sphenomorphinae
- Genus: Ristella; Gray, 1839

= Ristella =

Genus of lizards

Ristella is a genus of skinks, lizards in the family Scincidae. The genus is endemic to the Western Ghats of southwestern India. Member species are commonly known as cat skinks because of their retractile claws. This genus can be instantly identified by the presence of only four fingers in forelimbs in all the species (instead of the usual five). All the members look more or less similar, and are drab dark brown to blackish in colouration, with paler undersides. This poorly known group of lizards is diurnal, insectivorous, terrestrial to semi-fossorial in habits. They inhabit deep leaf-litter and grasslands in montane forests and rainforests.

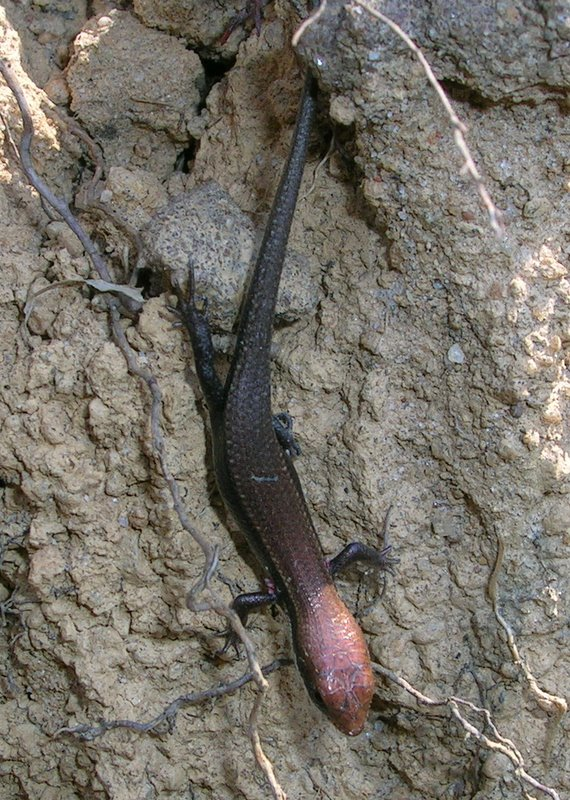
A Ristella from Dandeli in the Western Ghats.

== Description ==
Lizards of the genus Ristella share the following characters. The palatine and pterygoid bones are in contact on the median line of the palate, which is toothless. The palatine notch is small, far behind, corresponding to the posterior notch of the tongue. The teeth are conical. The eyelids are well developed, and are scaly. The ear-opening is distinct. The nostril is pierced in a single nasal scale. There are no supranasals. The prefrontals are small or coalesced. The frontoparietals and the interparietal are distinct. The limbs are well developed. The anterior limbs have four digits, and the posterior have five. The claws are completely retractile, each into a large compressed sheath formed of one large scale cleft beneath.

== Geographic range ==
All species in the genus Ristella are endemic to the Western Ghats hill-tracts of southwestern India. Currently these skinks have been recorded from the southern and central Western Ghats of Tamil Nadu, Kerala and Karnataka states. Hill ranges such as Travancore hills, High Ranges, Anaimalai, Nilgiris, Palni Hills, Coorg, Canara and Goa Ghats have been known to harbour these lizards.

== Key to species ==
- A. A pair of small prefrontals; frontonasal forming a suture with frontal.
  - a. Ear-opening much larger than nostril; dorsal scales feebly bi- or tricarinate.
    - R. rurkii
  - b. Ear-opening not, or but slightly, larger than nostril; dorsal scales sharply bicarinate.
    - R. travancorica
- B. Two azygous shields between rostral and frontal.
  - a. 22 to 24 scales round middle of body; adpressed limbs not meeting.
    - R. guentheri
  - b 26 scales round body; adpressed limbs meeting or overlapping.
    - R. beddomii

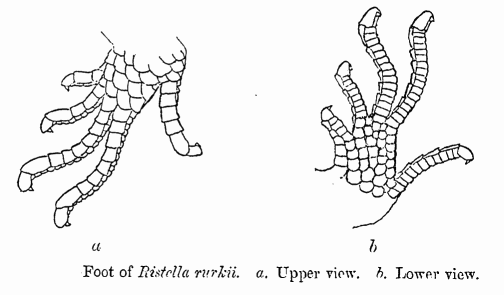
The retractile claws which give Ristella the common name of cat skinks.

== Species ==
The following four species are recognized as being valid:

- Ristella beddomii Boulenger, 1887 – Beddome's cat skink
- Ristella guentheri Boulenger, 1887 – Günther's ristella
- Ristella rurkii Gray, 1839 – Rurk's ristella
- Ristella travancorica (Beddome, 1870) – Travancore cat skink, Travancore ristella

Nota bene: A binomial authority in parentheses indicates that the species was originally described in a genus other than Ristella.
