= Ophisops elbaensis =

Conservation status
- Data Deficient (IUCN 3.1)

Scientific classification
- Kingdom: Animalia
- Phylum: Chordata
- Class: Reptilia
- Order: Squamata
- Family: Lacertidae
- Genus: Ophisops
- Species: O. elbaensis

Binomial name
- Ophisops elbaensis Schmidt & Marx, 1957

Species of lizard

Ophisops elbaensis, the Mount Elba snake-eyed lizard, is a wall lizard in the family of true lizards (Lacertidae). It is found in Sudan, Egypt, Saudi Arabia, and Yemen.
