= Ophisops microlepis =

Conservation status
- Least Concern (IUCN 3.1)

Scientific classification
- Kingdom: Animalia
- Phylum: Chordata
- Class: Reptilia
- Order: Squamata
- Family: Lacertidae
- Genus: Ophisops
- Species: O. microlepis

Binomial name
- Ophisops microlepis Blanford, 1870

Synonyms
- Gymnops microlepis (Blanford, 1870)

Species of lizard

Ophisops microlepis, the small-scaled lacerta, is a species of lizards found in parts of India.

== Distribution and description ==
Head much depressed; snout long; loreal region concave; upper labials projecting, angular. Upper head-shields smooth; nostril latero-superior, pierced between an upper and a lower nasal; a small postnasal wedged in between the two nasals; these three shields more or less distinctly swollen; fronto-nasal single; pre-frontals obtusely keeled; frontal much narrowed posteriorly, grooved longitudinally; four supraoculars, first and fourth smallest, the two principal separated from the supraciliaries by a series of granules; occipital small, broader than the interparietal, with which it is usually in contact; subocular bordering the lip, between the fourth and fifth upper labials; temporal scales small, obtusely keeled; two large supra-temporals bordering the parietal; tympanic shield very large, opercle-like. No gular fold; collar usually distinguishable. Dorsal scales small, as large as laterals or slightly larger; 52 to 64 scales round the middle of the body, ventrals included. Ventrals in 6 longitudinal series. A large postero-median pre-anal plate. The hind limb reaches the ear, or between the ear and the eye. 13 to 10 femoral pores on each side. Tail about twice as long as head and body; caudal scales very large. Brown or greyish above, with small black spots which may form a network on the sides; usually one or two pale longitudinal streaks on each side; lower surfaces white. From snout to vent 2.5 inches : tail 5.5.

Found in Bengal, Kachchh, Bilaspur.
