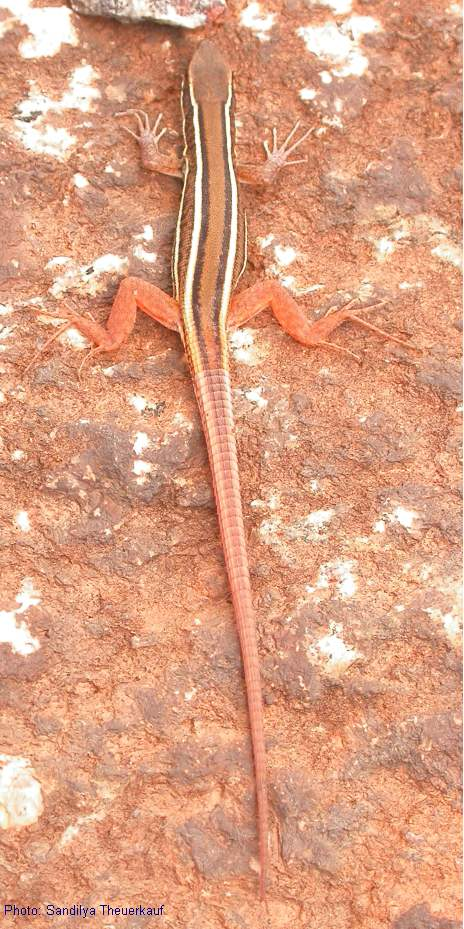
- Ophisops leschenaultii

Scientific classification
- Kingdom: Animalia
- Phylum: Chordata
- Class: Reptilia
- Order: Squamata
- Family: Lacertidae
- Subfamily: Lacertinae
- Genus: Ophisops; Ménétries, 1832

Species
- See text.

= Ophisops =

Genus of lizards

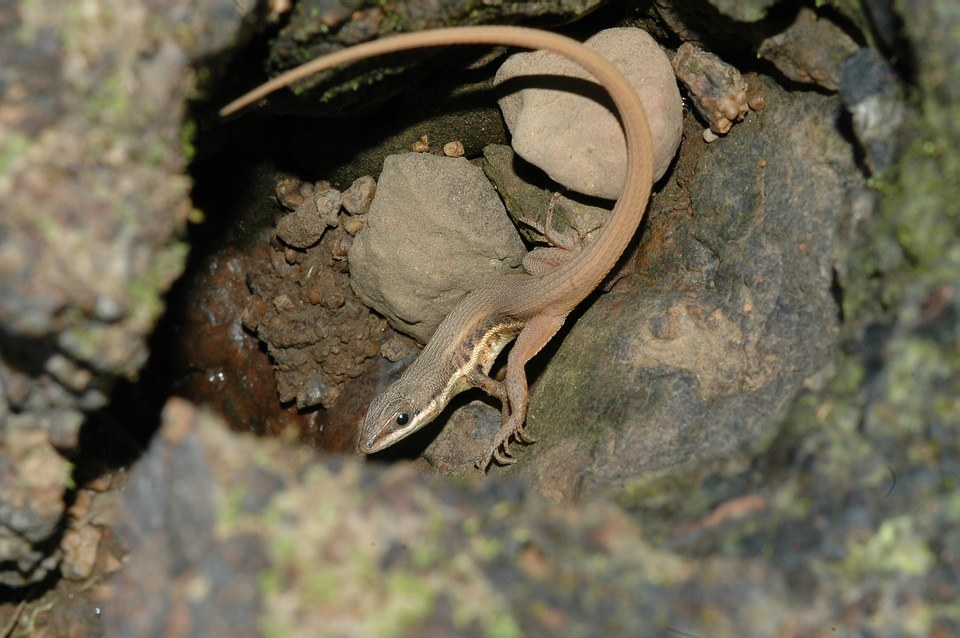
Unidentified Ophisops species (O. beddomei ?) from Bhimashankar hills, Maharashtra

Ophisops is a genus of wall lizards of the family Lacertidae. They are small lacertids characterized by transparent lower eyelids that are completely or partially fused with the upper lids to form a cap over the eye. Species of the genus Ophisops are distributed in southeast Europe, northeast Africa, to west Asia.

== Species ==
The following 11 species are recognized:

- Ophisops agarwali Patel & Vyas, 2020 – Agarwal’s snake-eye, Agarwal’s lacerta
- Ophisops beddomei (Jerdon, 1870) – Beddome's snake-eye, Beddome’s lacerta
- Ophisops elbaensis K.P. Schmidt & Marx, 1957 – Mount Elba snake-eyed lizard
- Ophisops elegans Ménétries, 1832 – snake-eyed lizard
- Ophisops jerdonii Blyth, 1853 – Jerdon's cabrita, Jerdon's snake-eye, Punjab snake-eyed lacerta
- Ophisops kutchensis Agarwal, Khandekar, Ramakrishnan, Vyas & Giri, 2018 – Kutch small-scaled snake-eye
- Ophisops leschenaultii (Milne-Edwards, 1829) – Leschenault's snake-eye, Leschenault’s lacerta, Leschenault's cabrita
- Ophisops microlepis Blanford, 1870 – small-scaled lacerta
- Ophisops nictans Arnold, 1989 – lesser snake-eyed lacerta
- Ophisops occidentalis Boulenger, 1887 – western snake-eyed lizard
- Ophisops pushkarensis Agarwal, Khandekar, Ramakrishnan, Vyas & Giri, 2018 – Pushkar small-scaled snake-eye

Nota bene: A binomial authority in parentheses indicates that the species was originally described in a genus other than Ophisops.
