= Ophisops agarwali =

Scientific classification
- Kingdom: Animalia
- Phylum: Chordata
- Class: Reptilia
- Order: Squamata
- Family: Lacertidae
- Genus: Ophisops
- Species: O. agarwali

Binomial name
- Ophisops agarwali Patel & Vyas, 2020

Species of lizard

Ophisops agarwali, the Agarwal's lacerta or Agarwal's snake-eye, is a species of lizard found in India.

== Distribution ==
India
