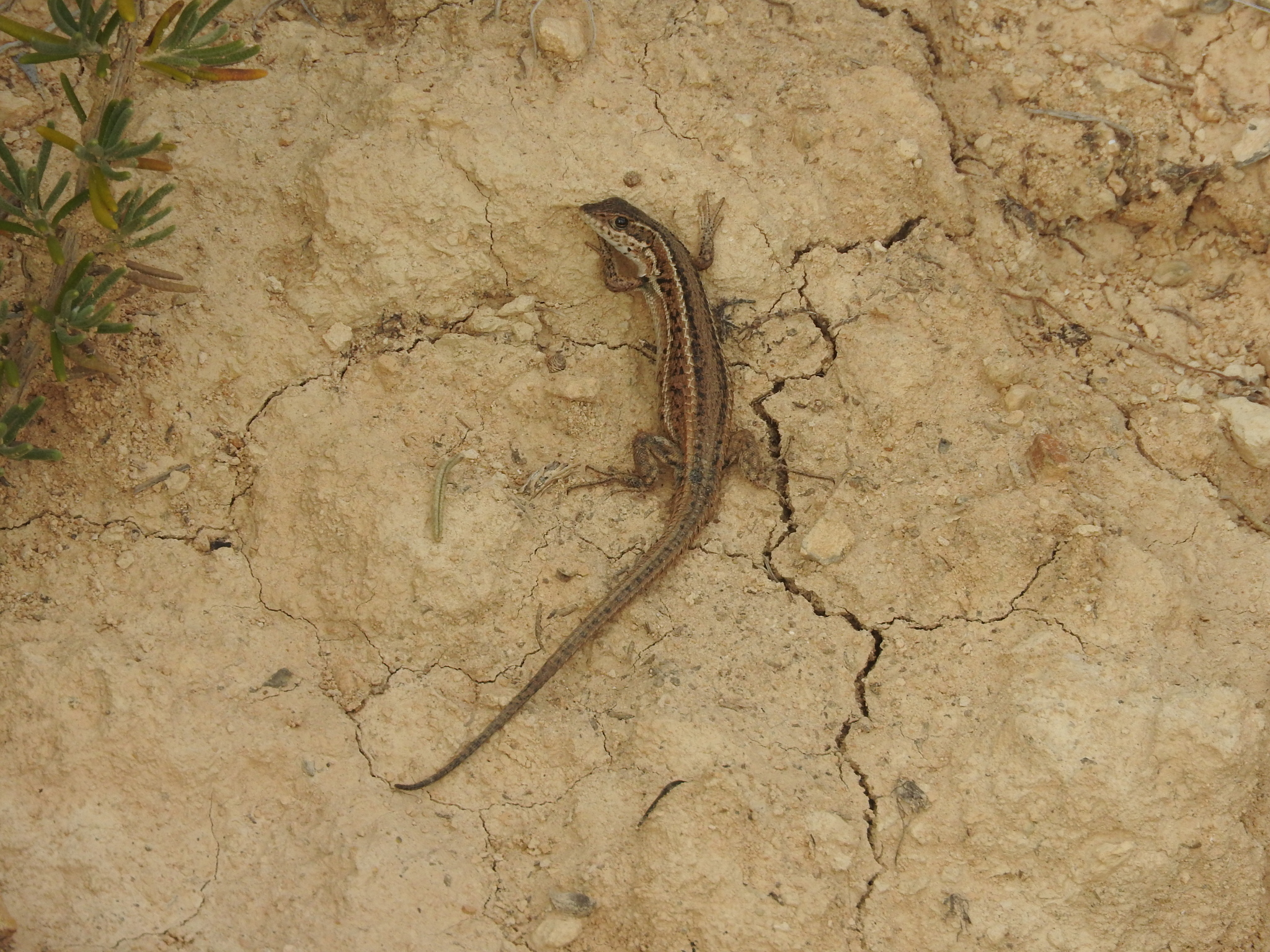
- Ophisops occidentalis

Conservation status
- Least Concern (IUCN 3.1)

Scientific classification
- Kingdom: Animalia
- Phylum: Chordata
- Class: Reptilia
- Order: Squamata
- Suborder: Lacertoidea
- Family: Lacertidae
- Genus: Ophisops
- Species: O. occidentalis

Binomial name
- Ophisops occidentalis Boulenger, 1887

= Ophisops occidentalis =

Species of lizard

Ophisops occidentalis, the western snake-eyed lizard is a species of lizard in the family Lacertidae. It is found in Algeria, Egypt, Libya, Morocco, and Tunisia. Its natural habitats are temperate forest, Mediterranean-type shrubby vegetation, subtropical or tropical dry lowland grassland, and rocky areas. It is threatened by habitat loss.
