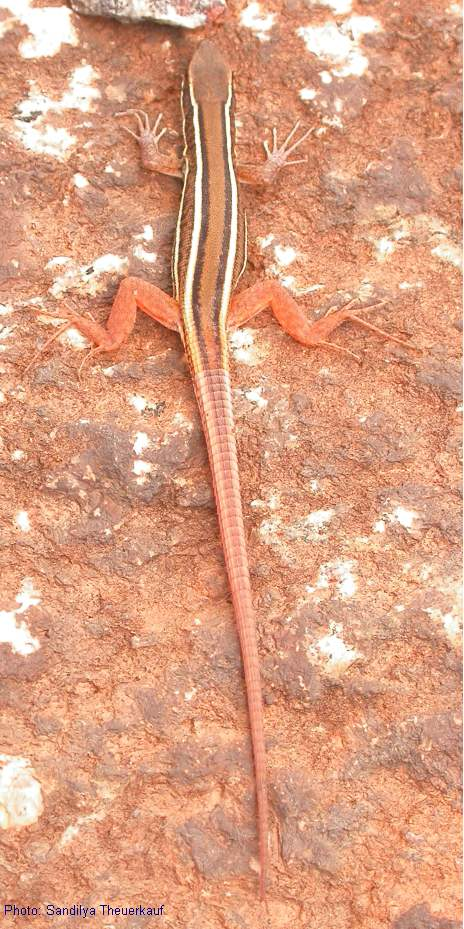

Conservation status
- Least Concern (IUCN 3.1)

Scientific classification
- Kingdom: Animalia
- Phylum: Chordata
- Class: Reptilia
- Order: Squamata
- Family: Lacertidae
- Genus: Ophisops
- Species: O. leschenaultii

Binomial name
- Ophisops leschenaultii (Milne-Edwards, 1829)

Synonyms
- Lacerta leschenaultii Milne-Edwards, 1829; Cabrita brunnea Gray, 1838; Calosaura leschenaultii — A.M.C. Duméril & Bibron, 1839; Cabrita leschenaultii — Blanford, 1870; Ophisops leschenaultii — Das, 1996

= Ophisops leschenaultii =

Species of lizard

Ophisops leschenaultii, commonly called Leschenault's snake-eye, Leschenault’s lacerta, and Leschenault's cabrita, is a species of lizard in the family Lacertidae. The species is native to India and eastern Sri Lanka. In Sri Lanka, this lizard is called pandura katussa in Sinhala. In some parts of the country, it is also called heeraluwa or sikanala, which is a common name for all skink-like reptiles.

== Description ==
The following description is from G.A. Boulenger's The Fauna of British India, Including Ceylon and Burma. Reptilia and Batrachia (1890):

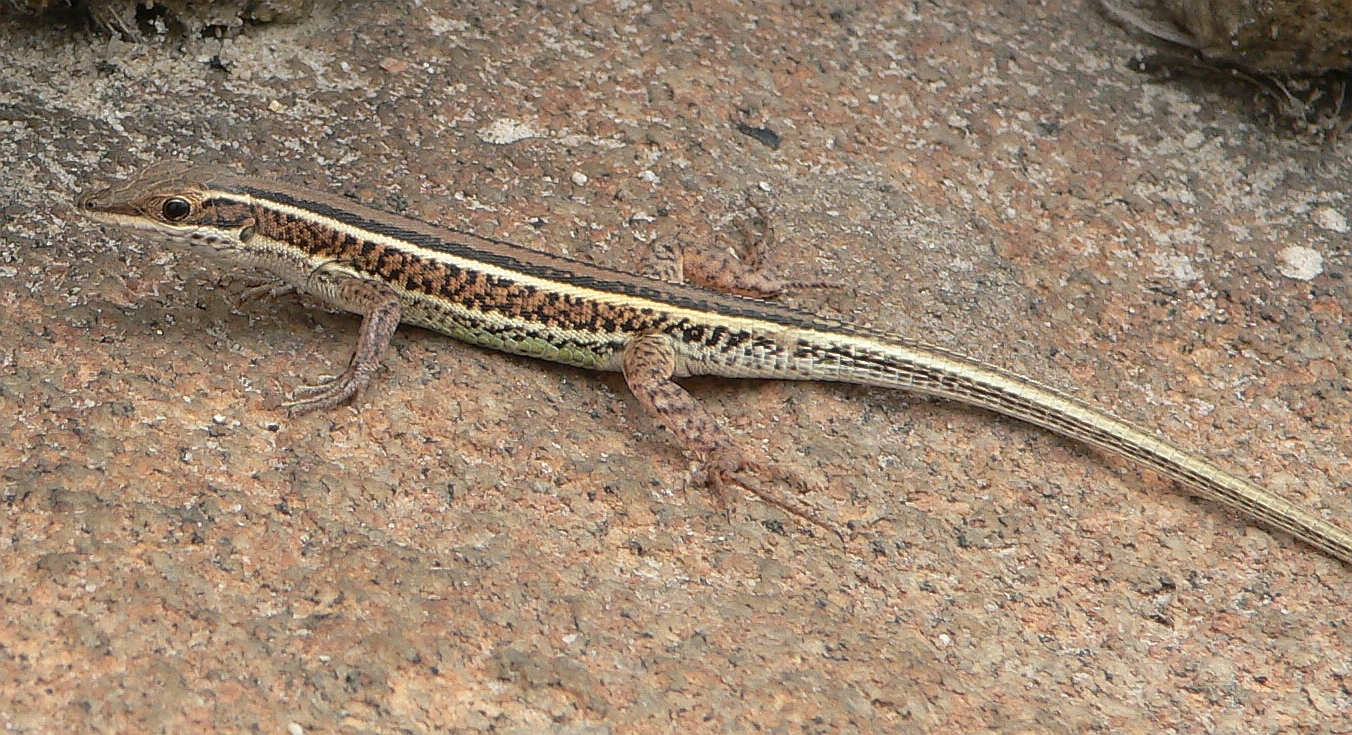
Adult

"Upper head shields strongly keeled and striated; anterior labials keeled, forming a projecting margin; canthus rostralis very strong; nostril in the horizontal suture between two large nasals which are extensively in contact with the rostral, and followed by one or two postnasals, the upper of which sometimes enters the nostril; no azygous prefrontal; frontal long and narrow; a small occipital; 4 supraoculars, first and fourth small, the two principal separated from the supraciliaries by a series of granules; subocular bordering the lip, between the fourth and fifth (or fifth and sixth) upper labials; temporal scales small, keeled; two large shields border the parietals exteriorly; a curved large shield on the supero-anterior border of the ear-opening; six large chin-shields on each side, the three anterior in contact with their fellows. Dorsal scales moderately large, scarcely larger on the back than on the sides; ventrals broader than long, in 6 longitudinal and 25 to 29 transverse series, the median longitudinal series narrower than the others; 42 to 48 scales round the middle of the body, ventrals included. A large postero-median preanal plate. The hind limb reaches the ante-humeral fold or a little beyond the ear; the length of the foot equals the distance between the antehumeral fold and the nostril or the tip of the snout. 12 to 16 femoral pores on each side. Tail nearly twice as long as head and body; caudal scales much larger than dorsals.

Brownish or golden above; a pale band, edged above with a black one, along each side of the body and tail, commencing from the supraciliary edge; another pale, black-edged band along the upper lip and side of the body; the space between the two light bands on each side usually black, or spotted with black; lower surfaces yellowish-white, tail and hind limbs often reddish.

From snout to vent 2 inches [5 cm]; tail 4 [10 cm]."

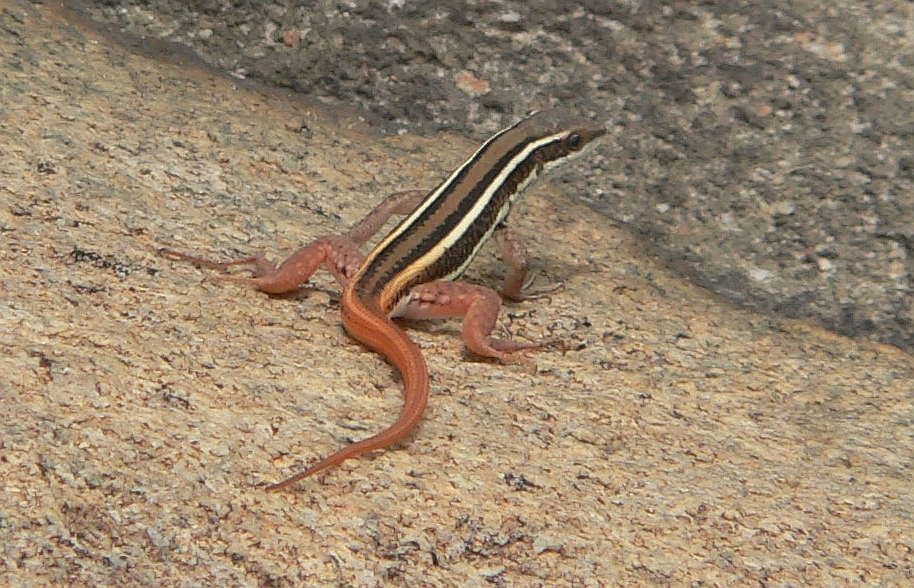
Young ones look like snake skinks, genus Riopa

Description from A. Günther's The Reptiles of British India (1864):

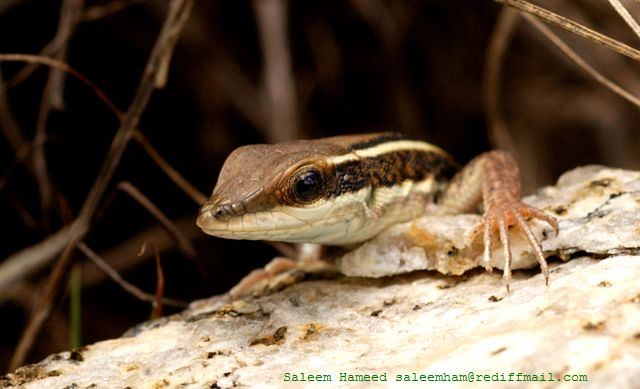
Closeup of head

"Two loreals; the central occipital very small. The lower eyelid transparent; temples with small, hexagonal, keeled scales of equal size. Dorsal scales keeled, rhombic. Ventral scales in six longitudinal and twenty-five or twenty-six transverse series. Vent covered with a larger central scale, surrounded by other small ones. Fifteen or sixteen femoral pores.

Brown, with two broad whitish bands on each side, the upper arising from the superciliary and running along the side of the back, the lower proceeding from below the eye and ear along; the middle of the side.

Total length 5 1/2 inches [14 cm], of head and trunk 2 inches [5 cm].

The specimens in the Paris Museum are said to be from the coast of Coromandel. Jerdon (Journ. As. Soc. Bengal, xxii. p. 476) says that he has recognized the species: it is somewhat locally distributed. I have seen it in the Salem and Coimbatoor districts only, especially near the banks of the Cauvery. It frequents bushy ground, hedges of Euphorbia and clumps of Cactus. Mr. Blyth adds that the Museum at Calcutta contains examples of what he takes to be this species, from Pind Dadun Khan, in the Punjab Salt Range; and that it formerly possessed the same from Afghanistan."

== Habitat ==
The preferred natural habitat of O. leschenaultii is rocky areas of either forest or shrubland, at altitudes from sea level to 1,500 m (4,900 ft).

== Behavior ==
O. leschenaulti is terrestrial and diurnal.

== Reproduction ==
O. leschenaultii is oviparous. Clutch size is up to six eggs.

== Etymology ==
The specific name, leschenaultii, commemorates French naturalist Jean Baptiste Leschenault de la Tour.
