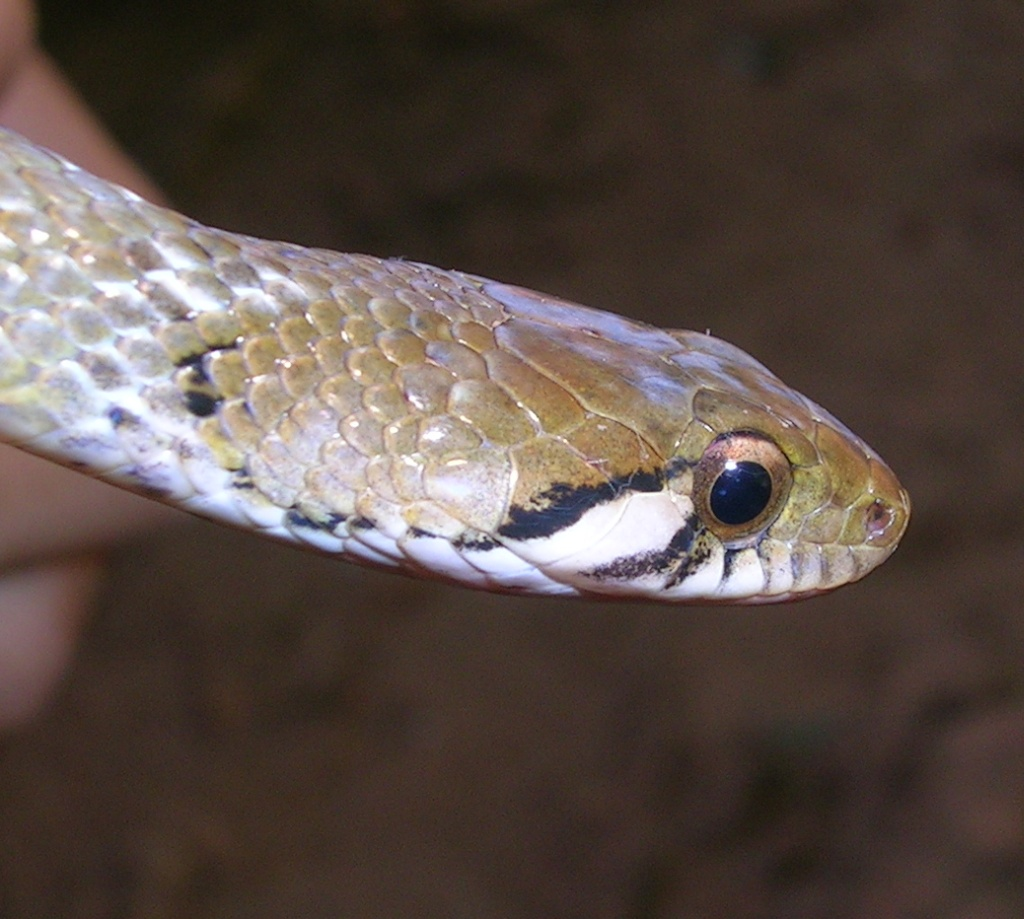

Conservation status
- Least Concern (IUCN 3.1)

Scientific classification
- Kingdom: Animalia
- Phylum: Chordata
- Class: Reptilia
- Order: Squamata
- Suborder: Serpentes
- Family: Colubridae
- Genus: Sahyadriophis
- Species: S. beddomei

Binomial name
- Sahyadriophis beddomei (Günther, 1864)

Synonyms
- Tropidonotus beddomii Günther, 1864; Natrix beddomei — M.A. Smith, 1943; Amphiesma beddomei — Das, 1996; Hebius beddomei — Guo et al., 2014

= Nilgiri keelback =

Species of snake

The Nilgiri keelback (Sahyadriophis beddomei), also known commonly as Beddome's keelback, is a species of snake found in the Western Ghats in India. The species is named after Richard Henry Beddome, 1830–1911, British army officer and naturalist. It was first discovered near the Nilgiris but is now known more widely from the Western Ghats. This snake is terrestrial and feeds on toads.

== Description ==
See snake scales for the terminology used

The eye of S. beddomei is moderate in size, its diameter in the adult equaling its distance from the nostril. The rostral is just visible from above. The suture between the internasals is as long as that between the prefrontals. The frontal is larger than its distance from the end of the snout, a little shorter than the parietals. The loreal is as long as deep or deeper than long. There is one preocular, and there are three (rarely two) postoculars. The temporals are arranged 1+1 or 1+2. The upper labials number 8 or 9, third, fourth and fifth, or fourth, fifth, and sixth entering the eye. There are 5 lower labials in contact with the anterior chin shields. The anterior chin shields are shorter than the posterior chin shields.

The dorsal scales are in 19 rows at midbody, rather strongly keeled, the outer row however, perfectly smooth. The ventrals number 131-150. The anal scale is divided. The subcaudals number 65-75.

S. beddomei is brown dorsally, with a series of yellow spots, each between two black spots or short transverse bands, along each side of the back. The upper labials are yellowish with black sutures. There is a yellow, black-edged, oblique streak from the eye to the corner of the mouth. A yellow band across the nape, behind the parietals, becomes indistinct with age. The belly is white, closely dotted with brown on the sides.

The longest specimen measured by Boulenger had a total length of 51–66 cm (20–26 in), which included a tail 13–19 cm (5–7 1/2 in) long.

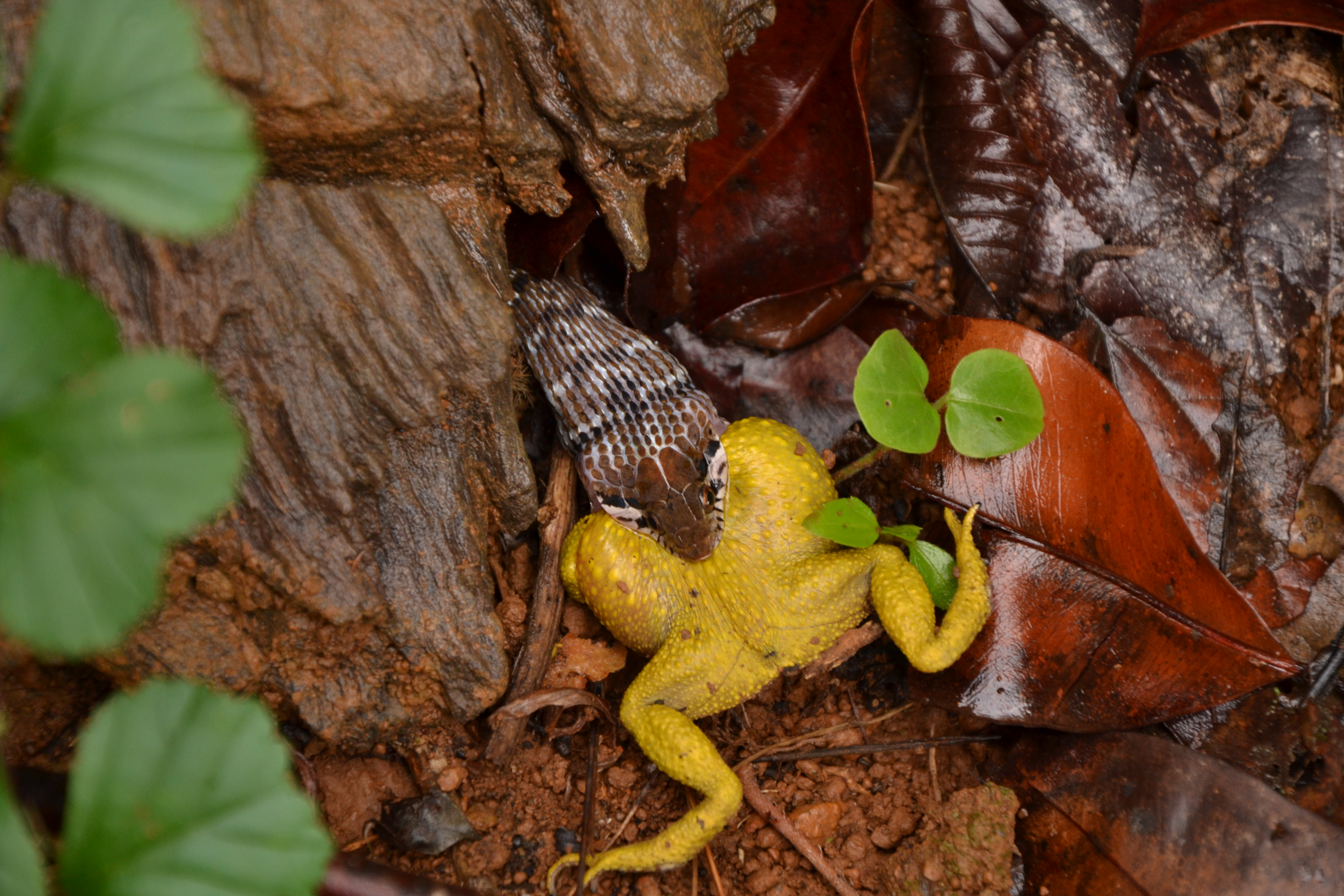
Beddome's keelback feeding on Duttaphrynus melanostictus

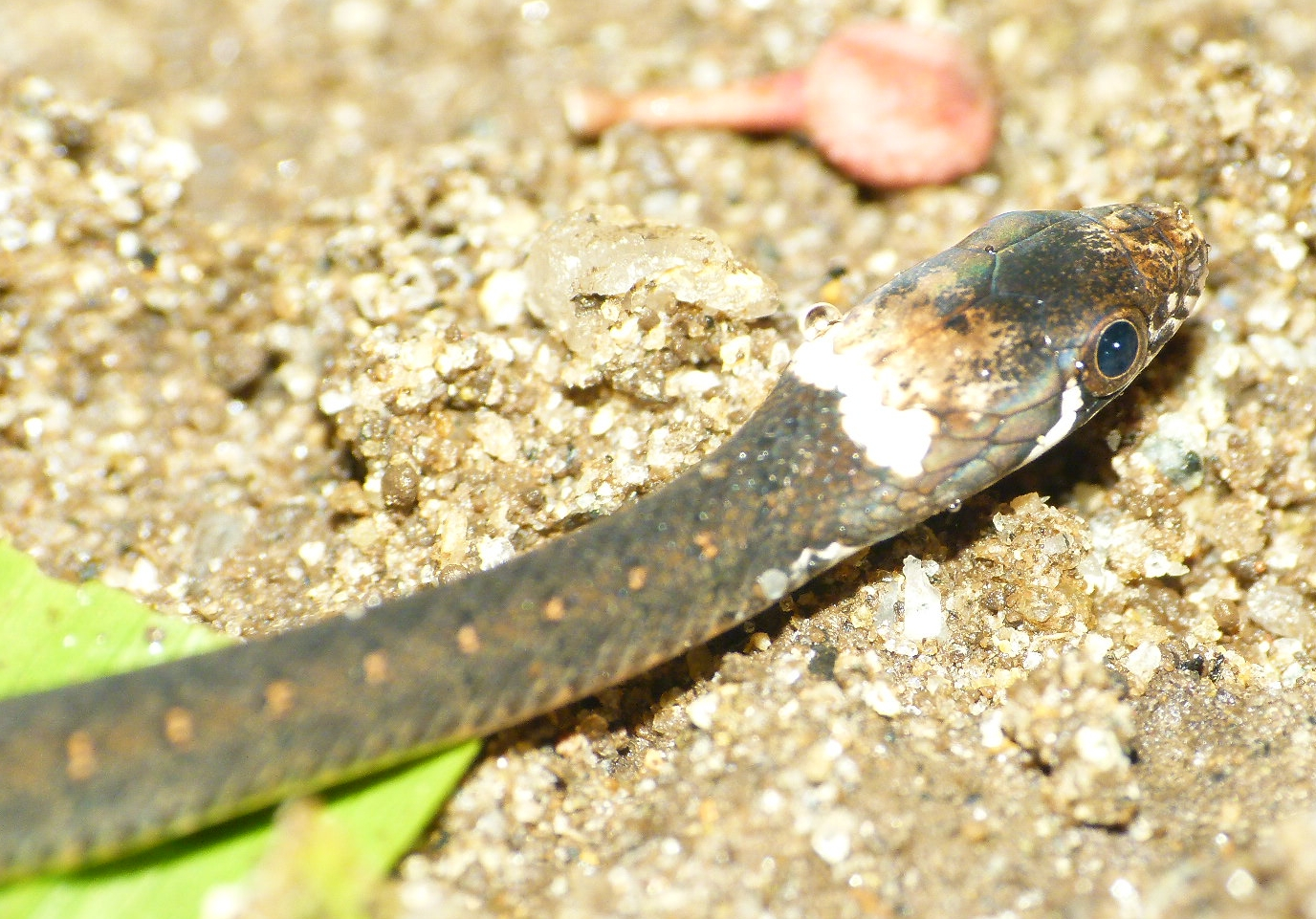
The young have a white patch on the nape

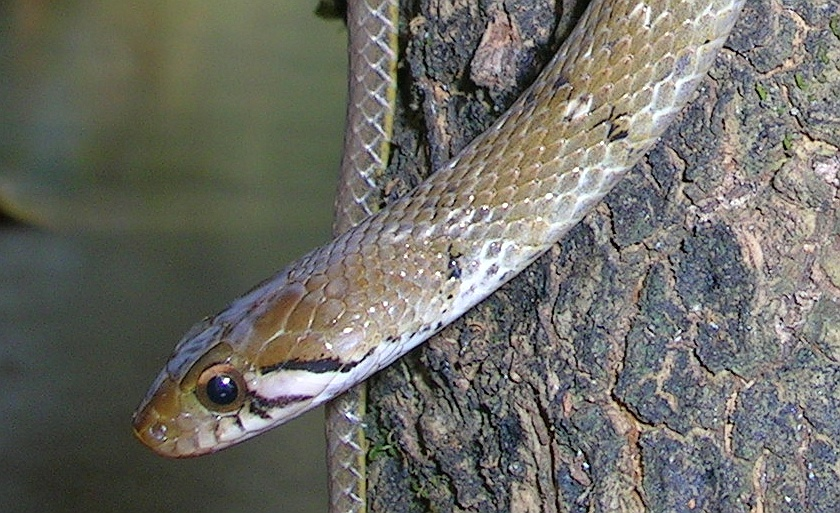
An adult, without white patch on nape

== Habitat ==
S. beddomei is found in the tropical rainforests and tropical moist forests of the Nilgiri hills, at altitudes of 60–1,000 m (200–3,280 ft).

== Behavior ==
Although not aquatic, S. beddomei can be found actively hunting from dawn to dusk on stream banks or close to other bodies of water.

== Diet ==
S. beddomei eats mainly toads.

== Reproduction ==
S. beddomei is oviparous.
