= Ristella guentheri =

Conservation status
- Data Deficient (IUCN 3.1)

Scientific classification
- Kingdom: Animalia
- Phylum: Chordata
- Class: Reptilia
- Order: Squamata
- Family: Scincidae
- Genus: Ristella
- Species: R. guentheri

Binomial name
- Ristella guentheri Boulenger, 1887

Species of lizard

Ristella guentheri, commonly known as Günther's ristella and Gunther's cat skink, is a species of lizard in the family Scincidae. The species is endemic to India.

== Etymology ==
The specific name, guentheri, is in honor of German-British herpetologist Albert Günther.

== Geographic range ==
R. guentheri is found in India, in Madurai district, Tenmalai, Travancore, and the Anaimalai Hills.

The type locality is "Madura, Sirimallay Hills" (= Sirumalai Hills, Madurai district).

== Habitat ==
The preferred natural habitat of R. guentheri is forest, at altitudes of 1,000–1,800 m (3,300–5,900 ft).

== Description ==
R. guentheri may attain a snout-to-vent length (SVL) of 3.9 cm (1.5 in). It has 22 or 24 scales around the middle of the body. It is reddish brown dorsally, and whitish ventrally.

== Reproduction ==
R. guentheri is oviparous.
