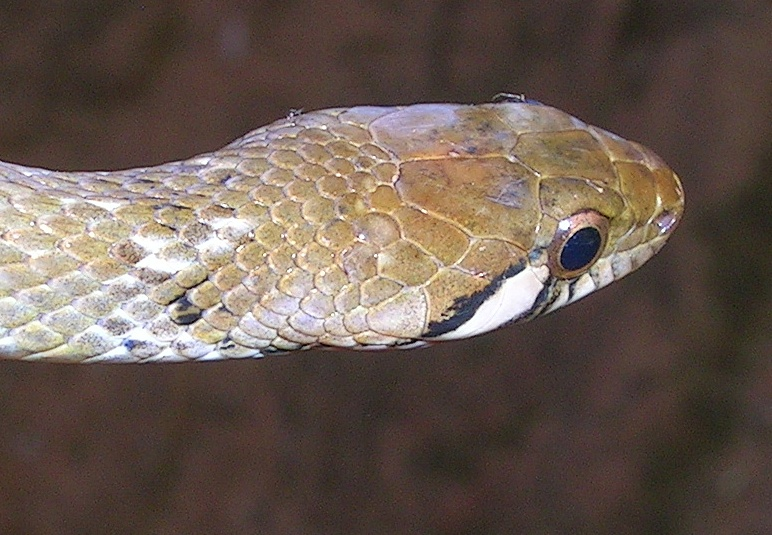
- Nilgiri keelback (Sahyadriophis beddomei)

Scientific classification
- Kingdom: Animalia
- Phylum: Chordata
- Class: Reptilia
- Order: Squamata
- Suborder: Serpentes
- Family: Colubridae
- Subfamily: Natricinae
- Genus: Sahyadriophis; Patel, Thackeray, Campbell & Mirza, 2023

Type species
- Sahyadriophis uttaraghati Patel, Thackeray, Campbell & Mirza, 2023

Species
- See text

= Sahyadriophis =

Genus of snakes

Sahyadriophis is a genus of snakes in the family Colubridae. The genus is endemic to the Western Ghats of India.

== Taxonomy ==
The genus Sahyadriophis was erected in 2023 with Sahyadriophis uttaraghati as the type species. The Nilgiri keelback, formerly placed in the genus Hebius, was also moved into this genus. Molecular data has recovered Sahyadriophis as the sister taxon to the clade containing Xenochrophis, Fowlea and Atretium, diverging from said clade during the late Oligocene or early Miocene, albeit with poor support.

== Species ==
Two species are currently placed in this genus:

- Sahyadriophis beddomei (Günther, 1864) – Nilgiri keelback
- Sahyadriophis uttaraghati (Patel, Thackeray, Campbell & Mirza, 2023)
