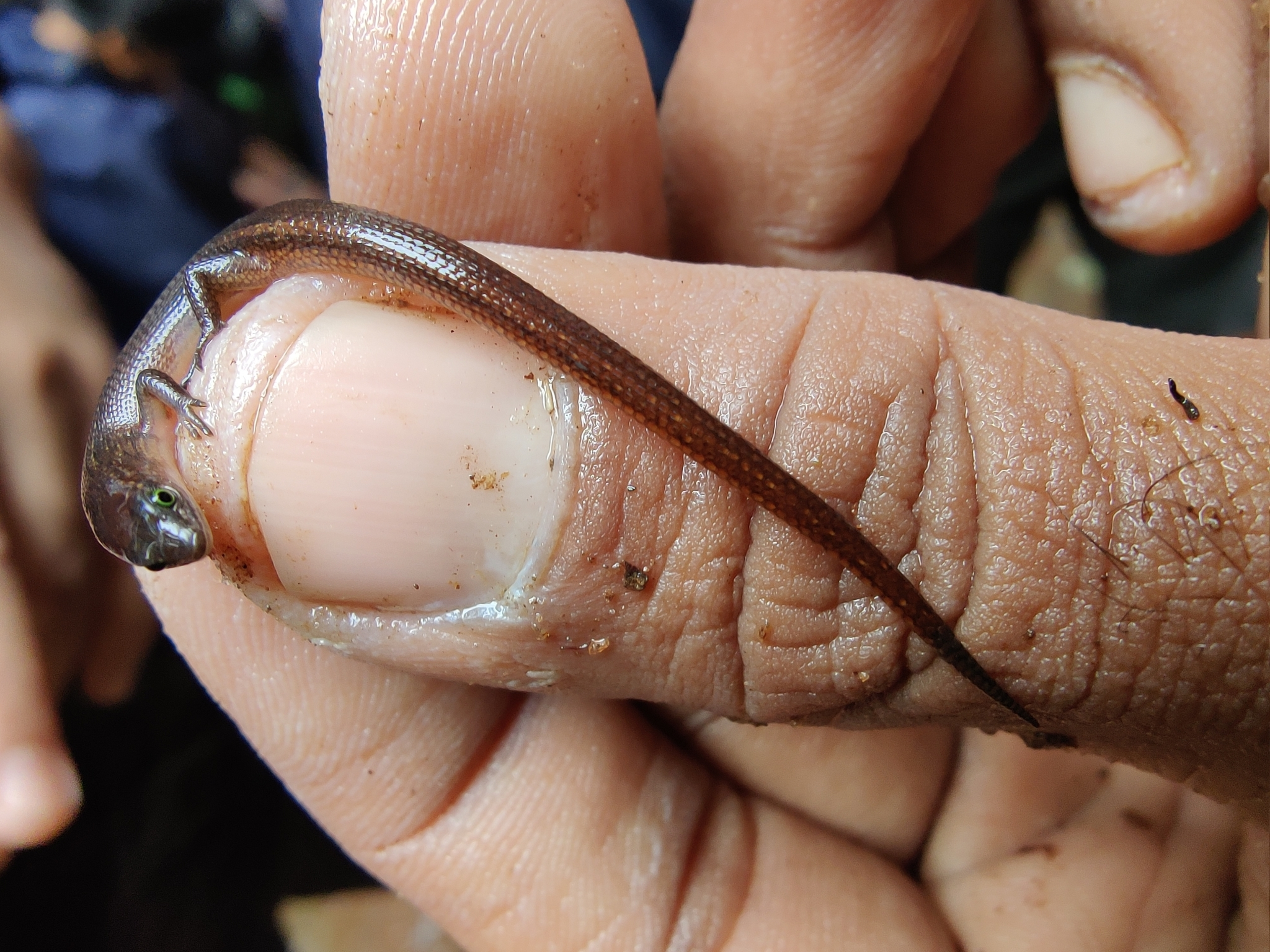

Conservation status
- Least Concern (IUCN 3.1)

Scientific classification
- Kingdom: Animalia
- Phylum: Chordata
- Class: Reptilia
- Order: Squamata
- Family: Scincidae
- Genus: Ristella
- Species: R. beddomii

Binomial name
- Ristella beddomii Boulenger, 1887

= Ristella beddomii =

Species of lizard

Ristella beddomii, commonly known as Beddome's cat skink and Beddome's ristella, is a species of skink, a lizard in the family Scincidae. The species is native to southwestern India.

== Etymology ==
R. beddomii is named after Richard Henry Beddome (1830–1911), who was a British army officer and botanist.

== Description ==
R. beddomii is a small species of skink, with a maximum snout-to-vent length (SVL) of 4 cm (1.6 in).

The ear-opening is larger than the nostril. There is a single azygos prefrontal, nearly as large as the frontonasal. The fourth to sixth upper labials are located below the eye. The body is much shorter than in the other species of the genus, and the adpressed limbs meet or slightly overlap. The dorsal scales are sharply bicarinate. There are 26 scales round the middle of the body. R. beddomii is reddish brown above, with or without 2 or 3 lighter dorsal streaks. The sides have scattered minute whitish dots. There is usually a black blotch with a few white dots above the axilla. The lower surfaces are uniform whitish.

All claws are completely retractile, each into a scale sheath.

== Geographic range ==
R. beddomii is found in Southwestern India(Sirsi ghats , Coorg, wayanad, Tenmalai, Travancore, Sharavati River, N Kanara district, kozhikode, Kannur, Cochin , Parambikulam). in Westernghats hill ranges and surroundings of Kerala and Karnataka

== Habitat ==
The preferred habitat of R. beddomii is forest in Leaf litter, Both Lowlands and Mid-High elevation [at altitudes of 50–1,300 m (160–4,270 ft).]

== Reproduction ==
R. beddomei is an oviparous species. Egg laying coincides with the southwestern monsoons. An adult female may lay a clutch of up to 3 eggs. Each egg measures about 9 mm (0.35 in) x 6 mm (0.24 in).
