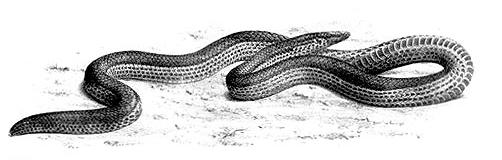
- Beddome's black shieldtail

Conservation status
- Least Concern (IUCN 3.1)

Scientific classification
- Kingdom: Animalia
- Phylum: Chordata
- Class: Reptilia
- Order: Squamata
- Suborder: Serpentes
- Family: Uropeltidae
- Genus: Melanophidium
- Species: M. punctatum

Binomial name
- Melanophidium punctatum Beddome, 1871

= Melanophidium punctatum =

Species of snake

Melanophidium punctatum, commonly known as Beddome's black shield-tail snake or Beddome's black earth snake, is a species of shield-tail snake endemic to the Western Ghats of India.

== Geographic range ==
It is found in the Western Ghats between Radhanagari Wildlife Sanctuary in the north and Kanyakumari district (Tamil Nadu) in the south.

== Description ==
Snout rounded; rostral small, just visible from above; frontal as long as or longer than its distance from the end of the snout; suture between the ocular and the frontal less than one third the length of the latter shield. Eye very small. Diameter of body 42 to 48 times in the total length. 15 scales round the middle of the body, 17 behind the head. Ventrals rather more than twice as broad as the contiguous scales, 184–198; subcaudals 15–18. Black above, beautifully iridescent; ventrals and the two lower series of scales on each side with a broad white border.

Type locality: "Travancore, [...] under a stone in the Muti-Kuli Vayal, a little valley on the Asamboo range (4,500 feet elevation)"
