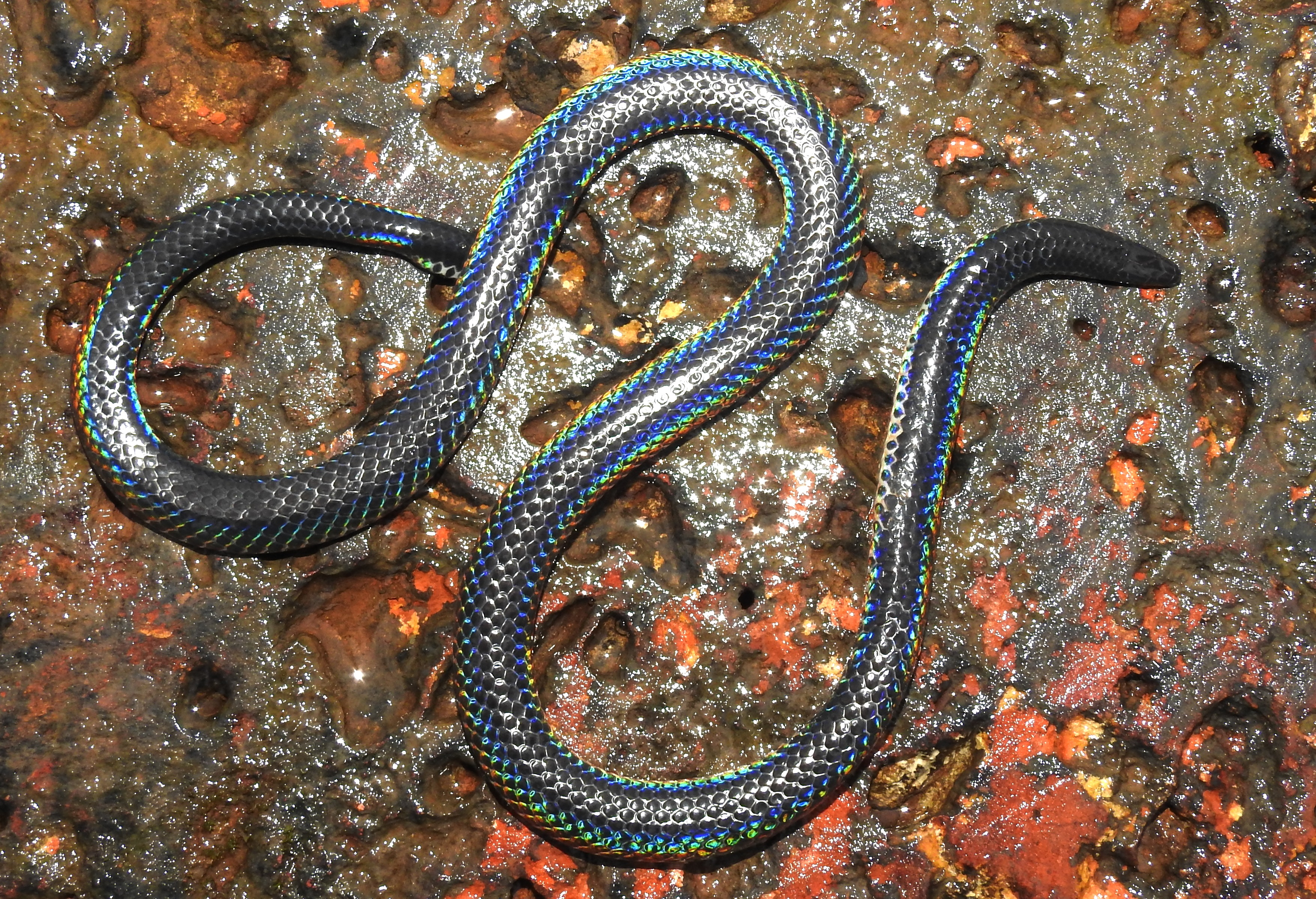

Scientific classification
- Kingdom: Animalia
- Phylum: Chordata
- Order: Squamata
- Suborder: Serpentes
- Family: Uropeltidae
- Genus: Melanophidium
- Species: M. khairei

Binomial name
- Melanophidium khairei Gower, Giri, Captain & Wilkinson, 2016

= Melanophidium khairei =

Khaire's black shieldtail

Species of snake

Melanophidium khairei or Khaire's black shield-tail snake is a species of burrowing snake of the family Uropeltidae, endemic to India.

The species was named after the herpetologist Neelimkumar Khaire.
