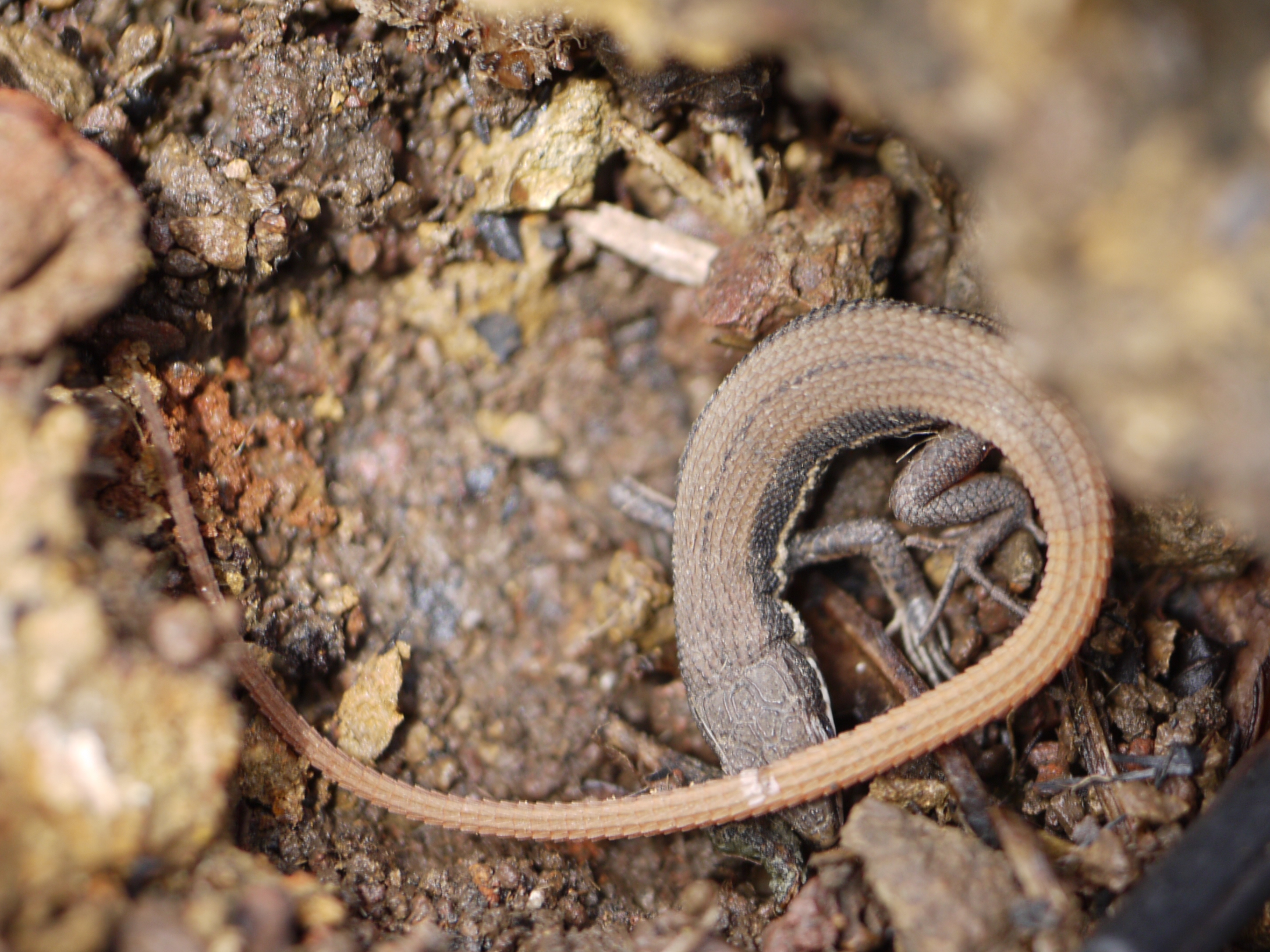

Conservation status
- Least Concern (IUCN 3.1)

Scientific classification
- Kingdom: Animalia
- Phylum: Chordata
- Class: Reptilia
- Order: Squamata
- Family: Lacertidae
- Genus: Ophisops
- Species: O. beddomei

Binomial name
- Ophisops beddomei (Jerdon, 1870)

Synonyms
- Pseudophiops beddomei Jerdon, 1870; Pseudophiops monticola Beddome, 1870; Ophiops beddomii — Stoliczka, 1872; Ophisops beddomei — M.A. Smith, 1935

= Ophisops beddomei =

Species of reptile

Ophisops beddomei, commonly known as Beddome's snake-eye or Beddome' s lacerta, is a species of lizard in the family Lacertidae. The species is a diurnal and fast-moving terrestrial lizard, which is endemic to the Western Ghats of India.

== Geographic range ==
O. beddomei is found in Western India in the Indian states of Goa, Gujarat, Karnataka, Kerala, Maharashtra, and Tamil Nadu.

The type locality is given as "Bremnagherry hills" (Brahmagiri Hills), Wayanad.

== Etymology ==
The specific name, beddomei, is in honor of Richard Henry Beddome, (1830-1911) British army officer and botanist.

== Description ==
O. beddomei is very similar to O. jerdonii. O. beddomei has two or three frontonasals on a transverse line, one or two azygos prefrontals nearly always are present, and the first and fourth supraoculars are usually broken up into several very small shields or granules. Lateral scales are distinctly smaller than the dorsals; 28 to 32 scales occur around the body. Femoral pores number eight to 13. Coloration is as in O. jerdonii, but the upper lateral light streak is frequently absent.

== Habitat ==
The preferred natural habitats of O. beddomei are grassland, shrubland, and forest, at altitudes of 200–1,000 m (660–3,280 ft).

== Diet ==
O. beddomei preys upon insects.

== Reproduction ==
O. beddomei is oviparous.
