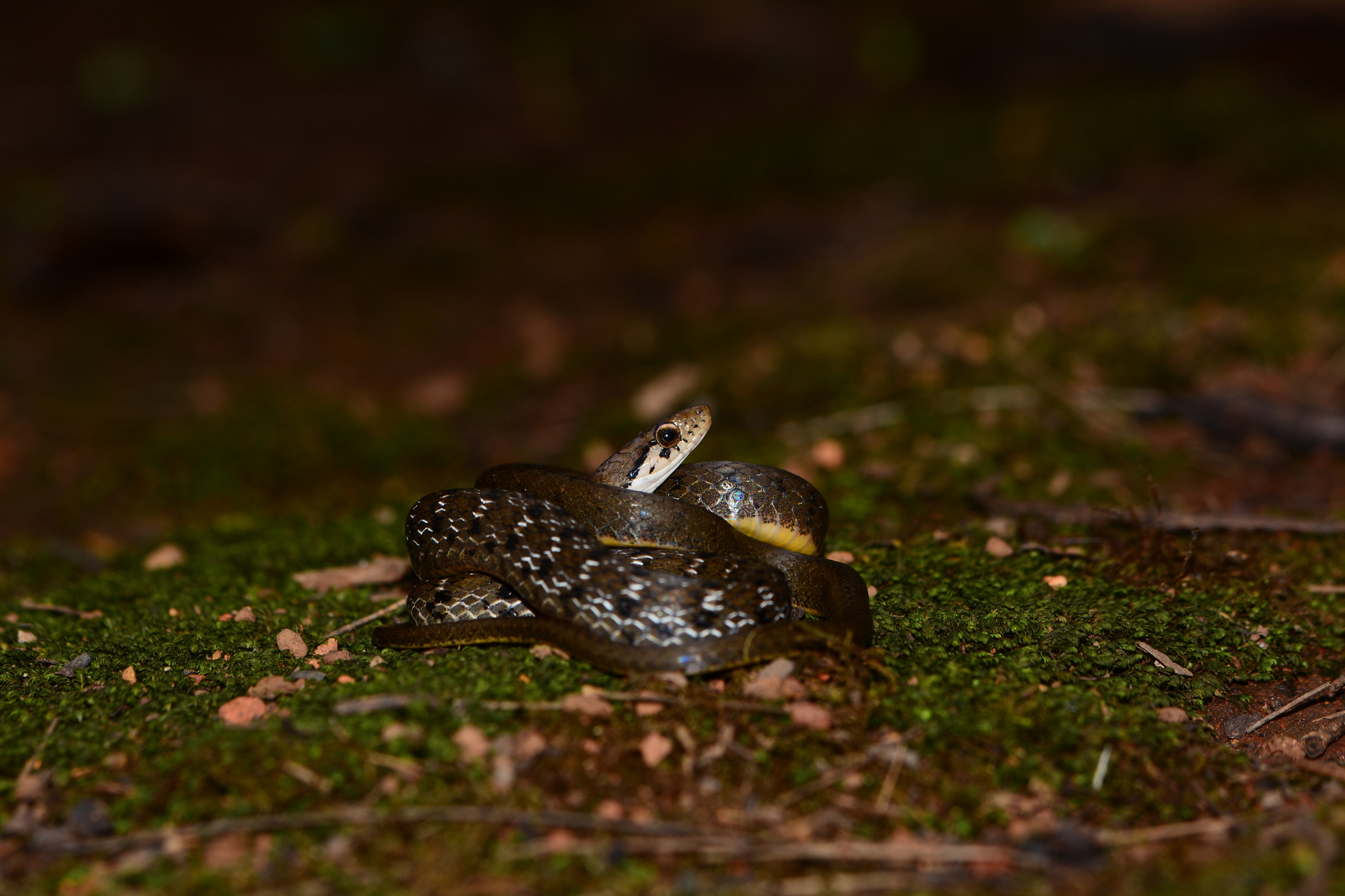
- From Mahabaleshwar, Maharashtra, India.

Scientific classification
- Kingdom: Animalia
- Phylum: Chordata
- Class: Reptilia
- Order: Squamata
- Suborder: Serpentes
- Family: Colubridae
- Genus: Sahyadriophis
- Species: S. uttaraghati

Binomial name
- Sahyadriophis uttaraghati Patel, Thackeray, Campbell & Mirza, 2023

= Sahyadriophis uttaraghati =

Species of keelback

Sahyadriophis uttaraghati is a species of keelback endemic to the northern Western Ghats region of India. It is commonly known as the northern sahyadri keelback.

== Description ==
Sahyadriophis uttaraghati has a predominantly brown to dark grey coloration with random black and white markings that become less distinct towards the rear of the body. The underside transitions from white in the front area to cream and yellow towards the rear. Some individuals may feature a light-colored bar on the back of the head and a downwardly directed post-ocular stripe, typically white or lighter in color with black edges.

== Range ==
Sahyadriophis uttaraghati appears to be common and widespread in the western ghats region of Maharashtra.

== Habitat and ecology ==
Specimens were observed actively moving during the day in a dried streambed. The species appears to be largely diurnal and has been observed feeding on Indirana and eggs of Nyctibatrachus.

== Etymology ==
The specific epithet is a combination of two Sanskrit words: 'uttara' for north and 'ghati' meaning dweller of the mountains/Ghats. The combination refers to the northern distribution of Sahyadriophis uttaraghati.
