= Ophisops kutchensis =

Scientific classification
- Kingdom: Animalia
- Phylum: Chordata
- Class: Reptilia
- Order: Squamata
- Family: Lacertidae
- Genus: Ophisops
- Species: O. kutchensis

Binomial name
- Ophisops kutchensis Agarwal, Khandekar, Ramakrishnan, Vyas, & Giri, 2018

Species of lizard

Ophisops kutchensis, the Kutch small-scaled snake-eye, is a wall lizard in the family of true lizards (Lacertidae). It is endemic to India.
