= Ophisops nictans =

Scientific classification
- Kingdom: Animalia
- Phylum: Chordata
- Class: Reptilia
- Order: Squamata
- Family: Lacertidae
- Genus: Ophisops
- Species: O. nictans

Binomial name
- Ophisops nictans Arnold, 1989

Species of lizard

Ophisops nictans, the lesser snake-eyed lacerta, is a species of lizard found in Sri Lanka and India.

== Distribution ==
Northeast and eastern India, eastern Sri Lanka.
