= Beddome's day gecko =

Conservation status
- Data Deficient (IUCN 3.1)

Scientific classification
- Kingdom: Animalia
- Phylum: Chordata
- Class: Reptilia
- Order: Squamata
- Suborder: Gekkota
- Family: Gekkonidae
- Genus: Cnemaspis
- Species: C. beddomei

Binomial name
- Cnemaspis beddomei (Theobald, 1876)

Synonyms
- Gymnodactylus marmoratus Beddome, 1870 (preoccupied); Gymnodactylus beddomei Theobald, 1876 (nomen novum); Gonatodes marmoratus — Boulenger, 1885; Cnemaspis beddomei — M.A. Smith, 1935

Species of lizard

Beddome's day gecko (Cnemaspis beddomei) is a species of lizard in the Family Gekkonidae endemic to India.

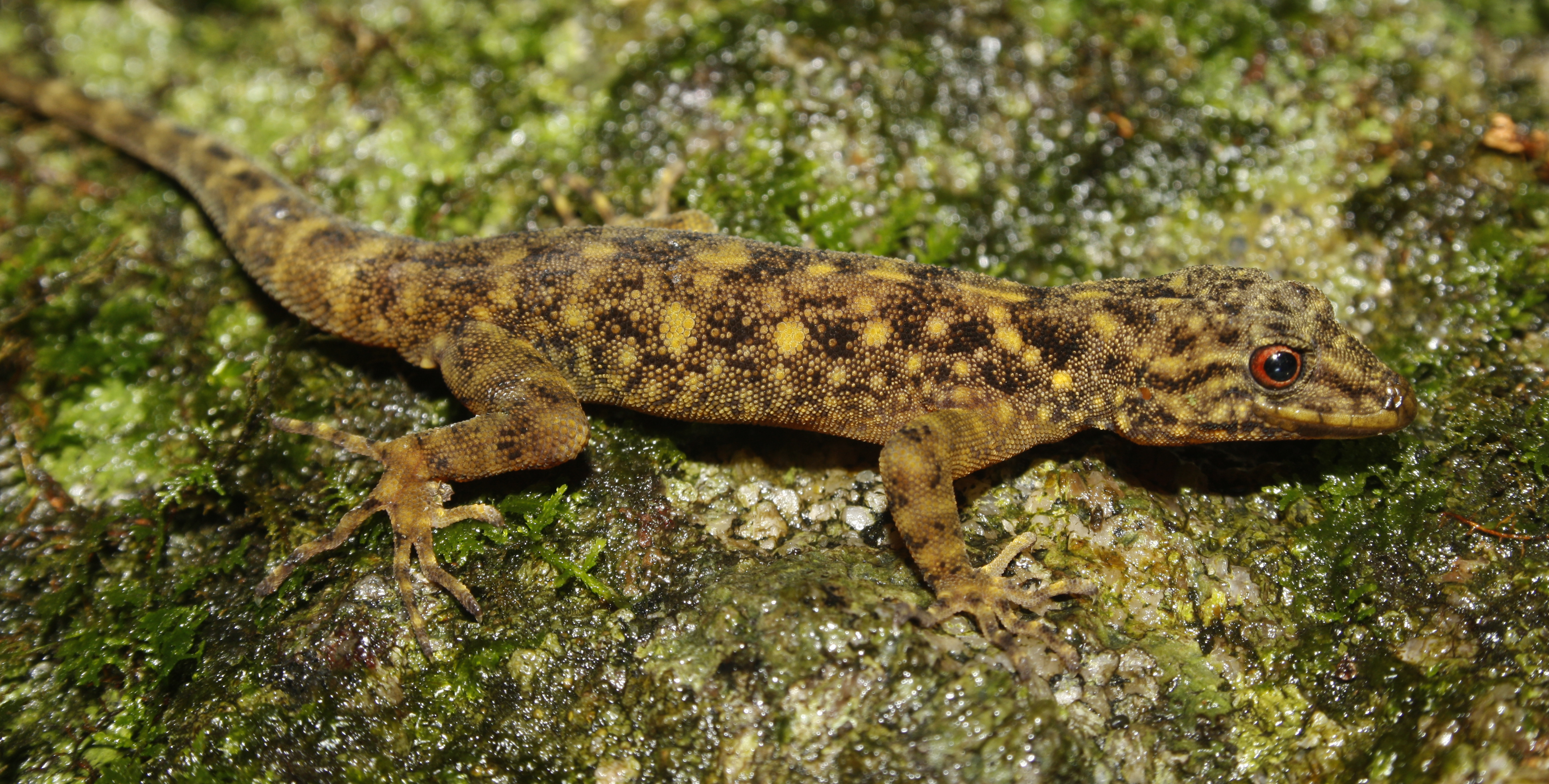
Cnemaspis beddomei, photo by Umesh Pavukandy

== Etymology ==
C. beddomei is named after Richard Henry Beddome, 1830–1911, a British army officer and botanist.

== Geographic range ==
C. beddomei is found in the Western Ghats, India. The type locality is South Tinnevelly and Travankor hills at elevation of 914 - 1,524 m" (3000 - 5000 feet).

== Ecology ==
C. beddomei is diurnal and is found under rocks in forests; it feeds mainly on insects.

== Reproduction ==
C. beddomei is oviparous.

== Conservation status ==
The exact threats to C. beddomei are unknown but may be human disturbance. However, it exists in protected areas Kalakkad Mundanthurai Tiger Reserve and Meghamalai.
