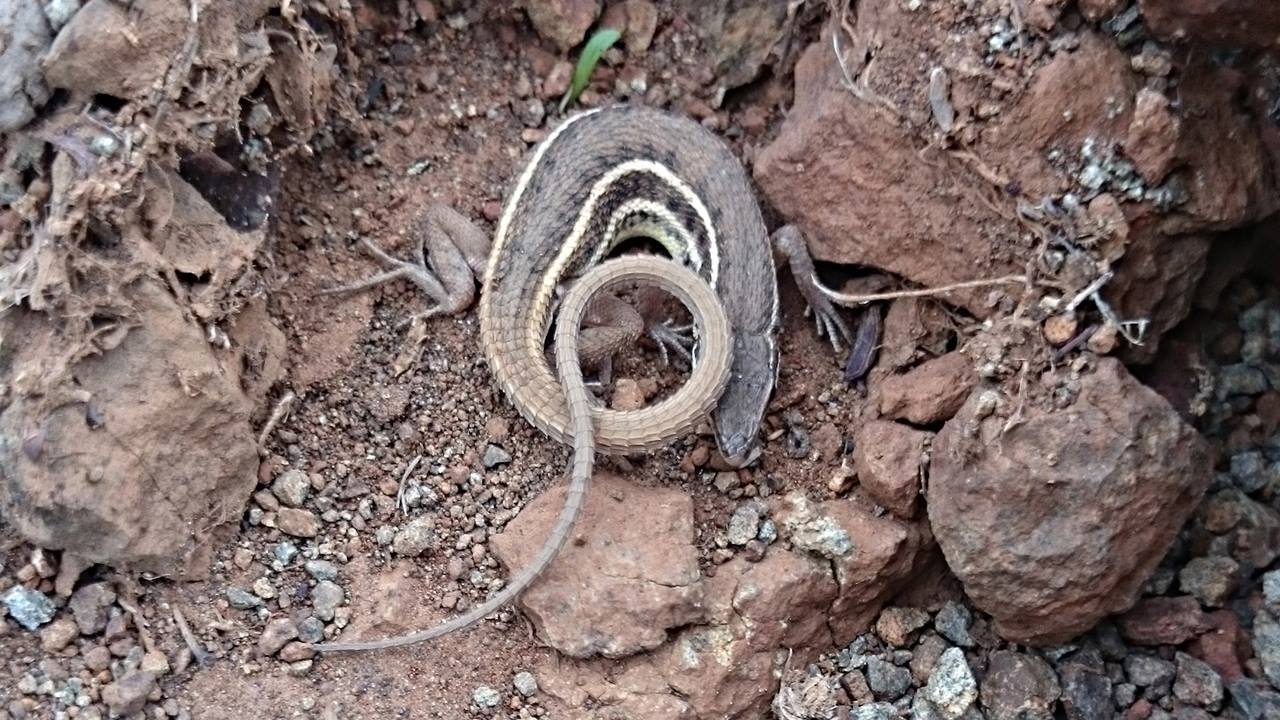

Conservation status
- Least Concern (IUCN 3.1)

Scientific classification
- Kingdom: Animalia
- Phylum: Chordata
- Class: Reptilia
- Order: Squamata
- Family: Lacertidae
- Genus: Ophisops
- Species: O. jerdonii

Binomial name
- Ophisops jerdonii (Blyth, 1853)

Synonyms
- Ophiops jerdoni Blyth, 1853; Tropidosaura jerdoni — Theobald, 1868; Pseudophiops jerdoni — Jerdon, 1870; Ophiops jerdonii Boulenger, 1887; Ophisops jerdoni — M.A. Smith, 1935; Ophisops jerdonii — Sindaco & Jeremčenko, 2008

= Ophisops jerdonii =

Species of lizard

Ophisops jerdonii, commonly known as Jerdon's cabrita, Jerdon's snake-eye, and the Punjab snake-eyed lacerta, is a species of lizard in the family Lacertidae. The species is native to South Asia.

== Etymology ==
The specific name, jerdonii, is in honor of British biologist Thomas C. Jerdon.

== Geographic range ==
O. jerdonii is found in India, Pakistan, and eastern Afghanistan.

== Description ==
Head moderate, feebly depressed. Upper head-shields rugose, keeled and striated; nostril lateral, pierced between 3 or 4 shields, viz. an anterior, or an upper and a lower anterior nasal and two superposed postnasals; a large frontonasal; frequently one or two small azygos shields between the pair of prefrontals; four supraoculars, first and fourth small, the two principal separated from the supraciliaries by a series of granules; occipital small, sometimes a little broader than the interparietal, with which it forms a suture; subocular bordering the lip, between the fourth and fifth (or third and fourth) upper labials; temporal scales small, keeled; one or two large subtemporal shields border the parietals externally; tympanic shield small or indistinct. No gular fold extending from ear to ear; collar quite indistinct. Dorsal scales large, strongly keeled, much imbricate, scarcely larger on the back than on the sides; 28 to 35 scales round the middle of the body (ventrals included). A large postero-median preanal plate. The hind limb reaches the shoulder or halfway between the latter and the ear in the male, not to axilla in the female; 7 to 11 femoral pores on each side. Tail once and a half to twice as long as head and body; caudal scales about as large as dorsals. Coppery-brown above, with two pale golden lateral streaks bordered with black, the upper extending from the supraciliaries to the tail, the lower from the upper lip to the groin; frequently a series of large black spots between the two lateral streaks; lower surfaces yellowish white.

From snout to vent 1.65 inches (42 mm); tail 3.2 inches (81 mm).

Central India (Saugor, Mhow), N.W. Provinces (Agra), Punjab, Sind, Madras Presidency (Bellary).

== Reproduction ==
O. jerdonii is oviparous.
