= Syzygium beddomei =

Conservation status
- Endangered (IUCN 2.3)

Scientific classification
- Kingdom: Plantae
- Clade: Tracheophytes
- Clade: Angiosperms
- Clade: Eudicots
- Clade: Rosids
- Order: Myrtales
- Family: Myrtaceae
- Genus: Syzygium
- Species: S. beddomei

Binomial name
- Syzygium beddomei (Duthie) Chithra

Synonyms
- Eugenia beddomei Duthie; Jambosa beddomei (Duthie) Gamble

Species of flowering plant

Syzygium beddomei is a species of plant in the family Myrtaceae. It is endemic to Tamil Nadu in India.

There was no report of occurrence for over a hundred years. It was rediscovered in Kanyakumari Forest division, Kanyakumari district, Agasthyamalai Biosphere Reserve, Tamil Nadu, India.
