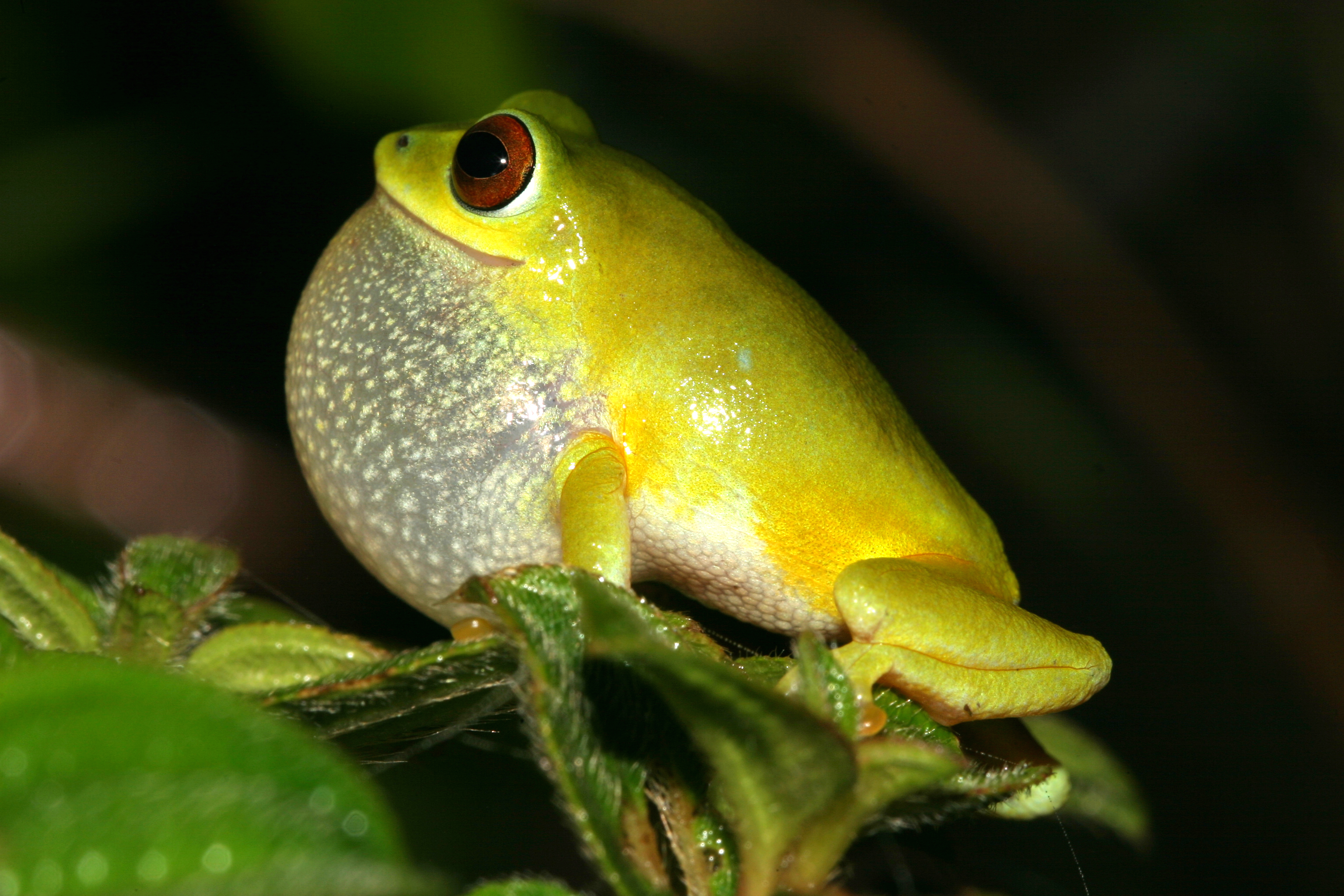

Conservation status
- Least Concern (IUCN 3.1)

Scientific classification
- Kingdom: Animalia
- Phylum: Chordata
- Class: Amphibia
- Order: Anura
- Family: Rhacophoridae
- Genus: Raorchestes
- Species: R. beddomii

Binomial name
- Raorchestes beddomii (Günther, 1876)

Synonyms
- Ixalus beddomii Günther, 1876; Philautus beddomii (Günther, 1876); Pseudophilautus beddomii (Günther, 1876)

= Raorchestes beddomii =

Species of amphibian

Raorchestes beddomii (Beddome's bubble-nest frog or Beddome's bush frog) is a species of frog in the family Rhacophoridae. It is endemic to southern Western Ghats of southwestern India in Kerala (Athirimala and Munnar) and Tamil Nadu (Kannikatti). Its name honours Colonel Richard Henry Beddome who collected the type specimen.

== Description ==
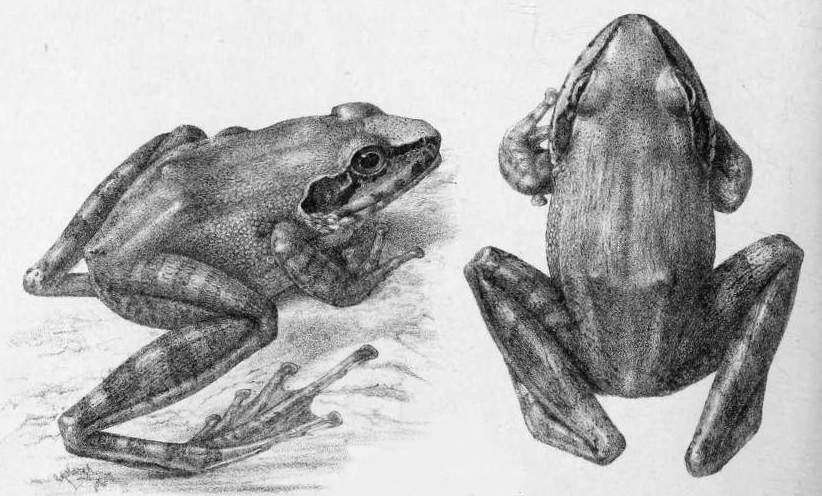
Raorchestes beddomii from Günther, 1876

Raorchestes beddomii are small frogs: males grow to a snout-vent length of 16–23 mm (0.63–0.91 in) and females to 23–30 mm (0.91–1.18 in). Their colouration is nearly uniformly green on dorsum, dorsal side of forelimbs, hindlimbs, and loreal and tympanic regions. Their iris is reddish brown. Size and colouration varies between the populations; frogs from Munnar were the larger and had lighter colour.

== Habitat ==
Raorchestes beddomii are found in moist forest patches as well as in wayside vegetation and tea plantations. It has been observed in the Western Ghat Mountains, between 120 and 460 meters above sea level. Calling males are usually sitting on leaves, some 1.5 metres above the ground. It is not directly threatened, but the known distribution area is small.
