= Richard Henry Beddome =

British military officer and naturalist

- Born: May 11, 1830; Clapham Common, England
- Died: February 23, 1911 (aged 80) Wandsworth, England
- Allegiance: United Kingdom
- Branch: British Indian Army
- Service years: 1848–1892
- Rank: Colonel
- Commands: Madras Forest Department

Colonel Richard Henry Beddome (11 May 1830 – 23 February 1911) was a British military officer and naturalist in India, who became chief conservator of the Madras Forest Department. In the mid-19th century, he extensively surveyed several remote and then-unexplored hill ranges in Sri Lanka and south India, including those in the Eastern Ghats such as Yelandur, Kollegal, Shevaroy Hills, Yelagiri, Nallamala Hills, Visakhapatnam hills, and the Western Ghats such as Nilgiri hills, Anaimalai hills, Agasthyamalai Hills and Kudremukh. He described many species of plants, amphibians, and reptiles from southern India and Sri Lanka, and several species from this region described by others bear his name.

== Early life ==
Richard was the eldest son of Richard Boswell Brandon Beddome, solicitor, of Clapham Common, S.W. He was educated at Charterhouse School and trained for the legal profession, but preferred to join the East India Company at the age of 18 and joined the 42nd Madras Native Infantry as a cadet at Jabalpur.

== Military career ==
He entered the Army, obtaining a direct cadetship in 1848 in the East India Company's service, and sent to India was posted to the 42nd Madras Native Infantry He was with that regiment at Jabalpur in 1856, serving as quartermaster and interpreter of the regiment, and from there he went to Secunderabad. Soon after his arrival at Madras, at the end of 1856, he was appointed to the Madras Forest Department, and never rejoined his regiment.

These are dates of his commissions: ensign, 20 January 1848; lieutenant, 10 November 1853; captain, 18 February 1861; major, 20 January 1868; lieutenant colonel, 20 January 1874; colonel, 20 January 1879.

== Madras Forest Department ==
In 1857, he was selected on account of his devotion to botany and natural history as an assistant to Dr. Hugh Cleghorn, the first conservator of the newly formed Forest Department of the Madras Presidency. He succeeded Cleghorn in 1859 and remained Chief Conservator until 1882.

== Botanist, herpetologist, malacologist ==
He became a member of the University of Madras in 1880. He made many floral studies in India and Ceylon, including Trees of the Madras Presidency in 1863 and Handbook of the Ferns of British India, Ceylon and Malaya Peninsula in 1892. He also studied reptiles, amphibians, and molluscs.

Colonel Beddome was essentially a botanist. In the study of the flora of South India, he devoted the best days of his life. The result was the publication of a series of valuable works containing figures of many species. The drawings were executed with great accuracy by the native draughtsmen he had trained to draw.

His botanical publications included The Flora Sylvatica for Southern India, 1869–73; Ferns of Southern India, 1873; Ferns of British India, 1876; Forester's Manual of Botany for Southern India, 1869–74; Icones Plantarum Indies Orientalis, 1874.

On Reptilia and Batrachia, he wrote at least 15 papers, and described over 40 new species of reptiles and amphibians.

This is a complete list of his papers on Mollusca: Descriptions of some new Operculated Land-shells from Southern India and Ceylon, 1S75. Descriptions of Land-shells from the Island of Koror, Pelew Group, 1889. Descriptions of some new Land-shells from the Indian Region, 1891. Notes on Indian and Ceylonese species of Glessula, 1906. Descriptions of Labyrinthus cuclausus and Neocyclotus Belli, n.spp., from Colombia, 1908 and in conjunction with H. H. Godwin-Austen: New species of Cyclophorus and a Spiraculum from the Khasi and Naga Hills, Assam.

Beddome described over 1,000 species of animals and plants.

Beddome formed a fine collection of land shells from India and other parts of the world, among which the minute forms were his favourites. His collection of specimens was presented to the British Museum at difficult times, and some specimens were also left with the Indian Museum at Calcutta. Further specimens are also in the National Museums Scotland.

He married Mary Sophia Fullerton in 1862 in London. They had seven children, all christened in the Madras Presidency. He retired in 1892 and lived at "Sispara", West Hill, Wandsworth until his death.

== Eponymous species ==
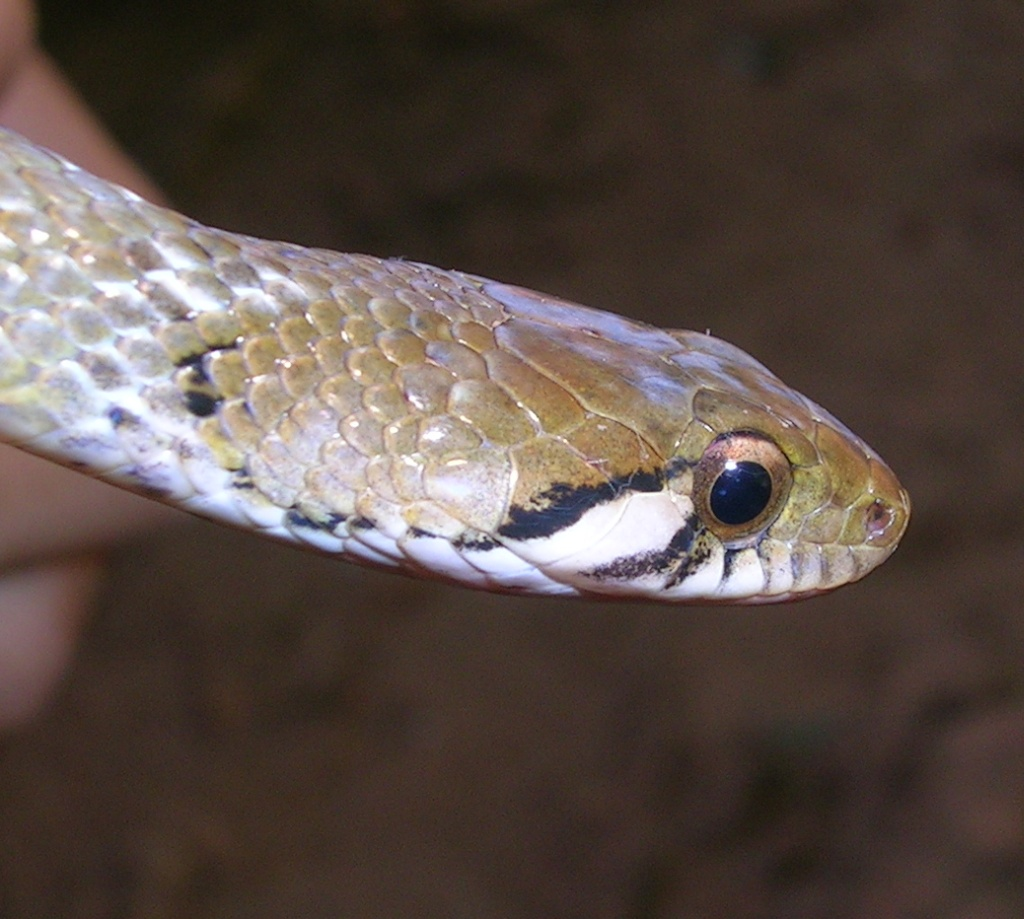
Hebius beddomei (Nilgiri keelback) named in honor of Richard Henry Beddome

Some of the species named in his honor are:

- Rhinolophus beddomei, lesser woolly horseshoe bat, a species of bat in the family Rhinolophidae
- Eutropis beddomei, Beddome's skink, a species of lizard in the family Scincidae
- Otocryptis beddomii, Beddome's kangaroo lizard, a species of lizard in the family Agamidae
- Ristella beddomii, Beddome's cat skink, a species of lizard endemic to India
- Cnemaspis beddomei, Beddome's day gecko, a species of gecko found in the Western Ghats
- Kaestlea beddomii, a species of skink found in the Western Ghats
- Ophisops beddomei, Beddome's snake-eye, a species of lizard in the family Lacertidae
- Gerrhopilus beddomii, Beddome's worm snake, a species of blind snake found in southern India
- Uropeltis beddomii, Beddome's shield-tail snake, a species of snake in the family Uropeltidae, endemic to India
- Boiga beddomei, Beddome's cat snake, a species of snake found in Sri Lanka and India (Western Ghats)
- Hebius beddomei, Beddome's keelback, a species of snake found in the Western Ghats
- Calliophis beddomei, Beddome's coral snake, a species of venomous snake in the family Elapidae
- Ichthyophis beddomei, Beddome's caecilian, a species of caecilian in the family Ichthyophiidae
- Duttaphrynus beddomii, Beddome's toad, a species of frog endemic to the Western Ghats
- Raorchestes beddomii, Beddome's bush frog, a species of frog in the family Rhacophoridae
- Nyctibatrachus beddomii, Beddome's night frog, a species of frog in the family Nyctibatrachidae
- Indirana beddomii, Beddome's litter frog, a species of frog in the family Ranixalidae
- Mariaella beddomei, a species of gastropod
- Hemiplecta beddomii, a species of gastropod
- Cycas beddomei, a species of cycad from India
- Syzygium beddomei, a species of plant in the family Myrtaceae endemic to India
- Cynometra beddomei, a species of plant in the family Fabaceae endemic to India
- Psychotria beddomei, a species of plant in the family Rubiaceae endemic to India
- Litsea beddomei, a species of plant in the family Lauraceae endemic to India
- Beddomixalus bijui, a species of tree frog in the family Rhacophoridae
