= Hermann's tortoise =

- Testudo hermanni hermanni on Mallorca

Conservation status
- Vulnerable (IUCN 3.1)
- CITES Appendix II

Scientific classification
- Kingdom: Animalia
- Phylum: Chordata
- Class: Reptilia
- Order: Testudines
- Suborder: Cryptodira
- Family: Testudinidae
- Genus: Testudo
- Species: T. hermanni

Binomial name
- Testudo hermanni Gmelin, 1789
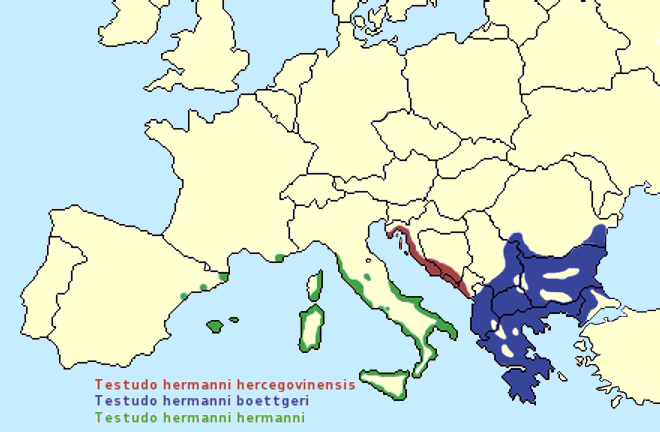
- Range map. Western green population is hermanni, eastern blue boettgeri and red hercegovinensis.

Synonyms
- T. h. hermanni: Testudo hermanni Gmelin, 1789; Testudo graeca bettai Lataste, 1881; Testudo hermanni hermanni — Wermuth, 1952; Testudo hermanni robertmertensi Wermuth, 1952; Protestudo hermanni — Chkhikvadze, 1983; Agrionemys hermanni — Gmira, 1993; Testudo hermanii [sic] Gerlach, 2001 (ex errore); Testudo hermannii [sic] Claude & Tong, 2004 (ex errore); Eurotestudo hermanni — de Lapparent de Broin et al., 2006; T. h. boettgeri: Testudo graeca var. boettgeri Mojsisovics, 1889; Testudo graeca var. hercegovinensis F. Werner, 1899; Testudo enriquesi Parenzan, 1932; Testudo hermanni boettgeri — Bour, 1987; Testudo boettgeri — Artner, Budischek & Froschauer, 2000; Testudo hercegovinensis — Perälä, 2002; Testudo boettgeri boettgeri — Artner, 2003; Testudo boettgeri hercegovinensis — Artner, 2003; Testudo hermanni hercegovinensis — S. Vinke & T. Vinke, 2004; Eurotestudo boettgeri — de Lapperent de Broin et al., 2006; Eurotestudo hercegovinensis — de Lapparent de Broin et al., 2006

Species of tortoise

The Hermann's tortoise (Testudo hermanni) is a species of tortoise native to Europe.

== Etymology ==
The specific epithet, hermanni, honors French naturalist Johann Hermann.

The subspecific name, boettgeri, honors German herpetologist Oskar Boettger.

== Taxonomy ==
Two subspecies are known: the western Hermann's tortoise (T. h. hermanni) and the eastern Hermann's tortoise (T. h. boettgeri). Sometimes mentioned as a subspecies, T. h. peleponnesica is not yet confirmed to be genetically different from T. h. boettgeri.

In 2006, Hermann's tortoise was suggested to be moved to the genus Eurotestudo and to bring the subspecies to the rank of species (Eurotestudo hermanni and Eurotestudo boettgeri). Although some factors indicate this might be correct, the data at hand are not unequivocally in support and the relationships between Hermann's and the Russian tortoise among each other and to the other species placed in Testudo are not robustly determined. Hence, it seems doubtful that the new genus will be accepted for now. The elevation of the subspecies to full species was tentatively rejected under the biological species concept at least, as there still seems significant gene flow.

Of note, the rate of evolution as measured by mutations accumulating in the mtDNA differs markedly, with the eastern populations having evolved faster. This is apparently due to stronger fragmentation of the population on the mountainous Balkans during the last ice age. While this has no profound implications for taxonomy of this species, apart from suggesting that two other proposed subspecies are actually just local forms at present, it renders the use of molecular clocks in Testudo even more dubious and unreliable than they are for tortoises in general.

=== T. h. hermanni ===
The subspecies T. h. hermanni includes the former subspecies T. h. robertmertensi and has a number of local forms. It has a highly arched shell with an intensive coloration, with its yellow coloration making a strong contrast to the dark patches. The colors wash out somewhat in older animals, but the intense yellow is often maintained. The underside has two connected black bands along the central seam.

The coloration of the head ranges from dark green to yellowish, with isolated dark patches. A particular characteristic is a yellow fleck on the cheek found in most specimens, although not in all; T. h. robertmertensi is the name of a morph with very prominent cheek spots. Generally, the forelegs have no black pigmentation on their undersides. The base of the claws is often lightly colored. The tail in males is larger than in females and possesses a spike. Generally, the shell protecting the tail is divided. A few specimens can be found with undivided shells, similar to the Greek tortoise.

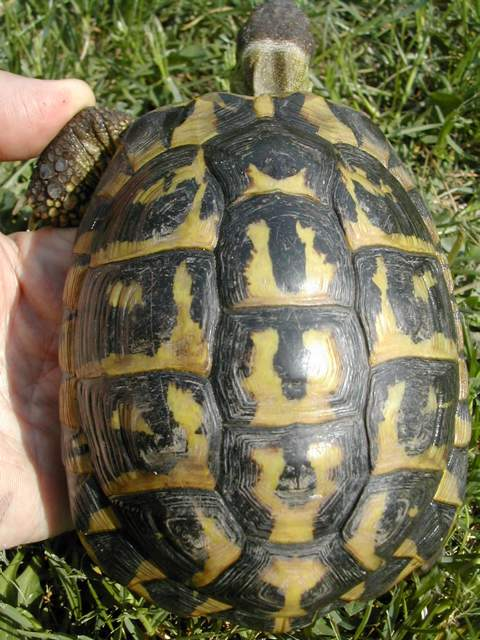
Var colouring

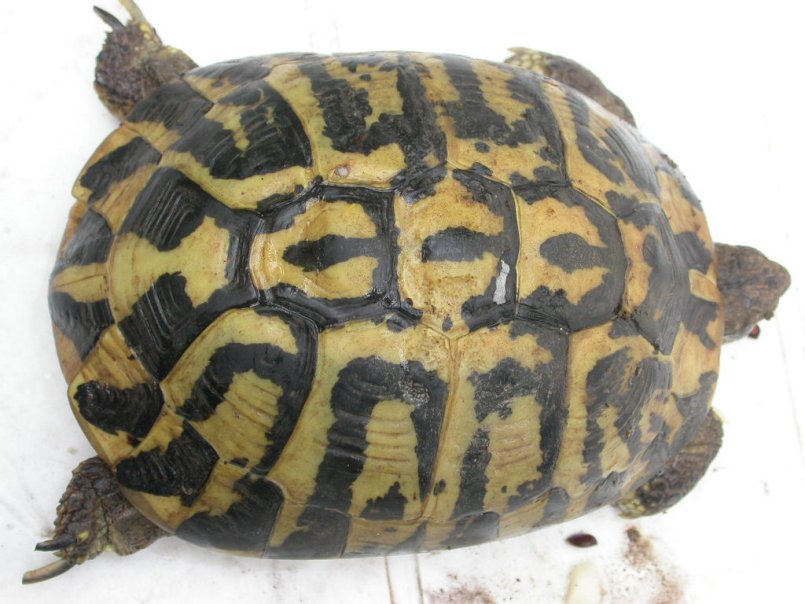
Apulian colouring

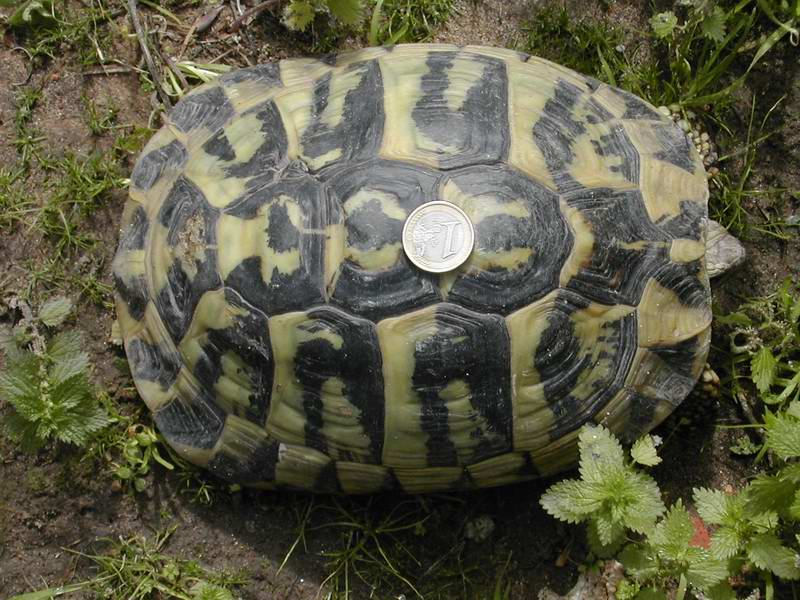
Sardinian colouring

=== T. h. boettgeri ===
The subspecies T. h. hercegovinensis, known as the Dalmatian tortoise, (Balkans coast) and the local T. h. peloponnesica (southwestern Peloponnesus coast) are now included here; they constitute local forms that are not yet geographically or in other ways reproductively isolated and apparently, derive from relict populations of the last ice age. The eastern Hermann's tortoises also have arched, almost round carapaces, but some are notably flatter and more oblong. The coloration is brownish with a yellow or greenish hue and with isolated black flecks. The coloring tends to wash out quite strongly in older animals. The underside is almost always solid horn color and has separate black patches on either side of the central seam.

The head is brown to black, with fine scales. The forelegs similarly possess fine scales. The limbs generally have five claws, which are darkly colored at their base. The hind legs are noticeably thicker than the forelegs, almost plump. The particularly strong tail ends in a spike, which may be very large in older male specimens. Females have noticeably smaller tail spikes, which are slightly bent toward the body. They can vary in size, but do not grow a huge amount. Their age can be around 70–80 years.

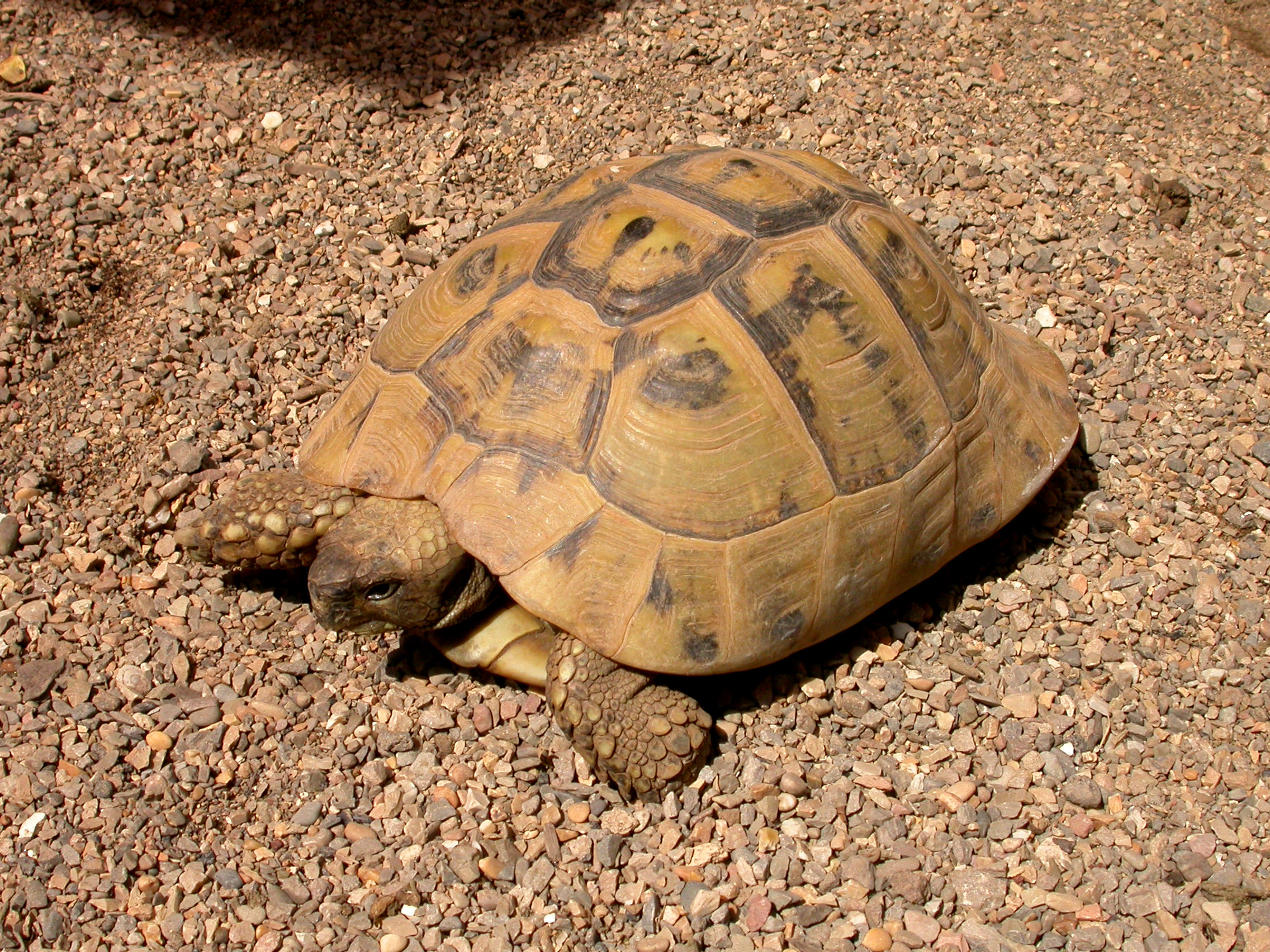
Adult female, Bulgaria

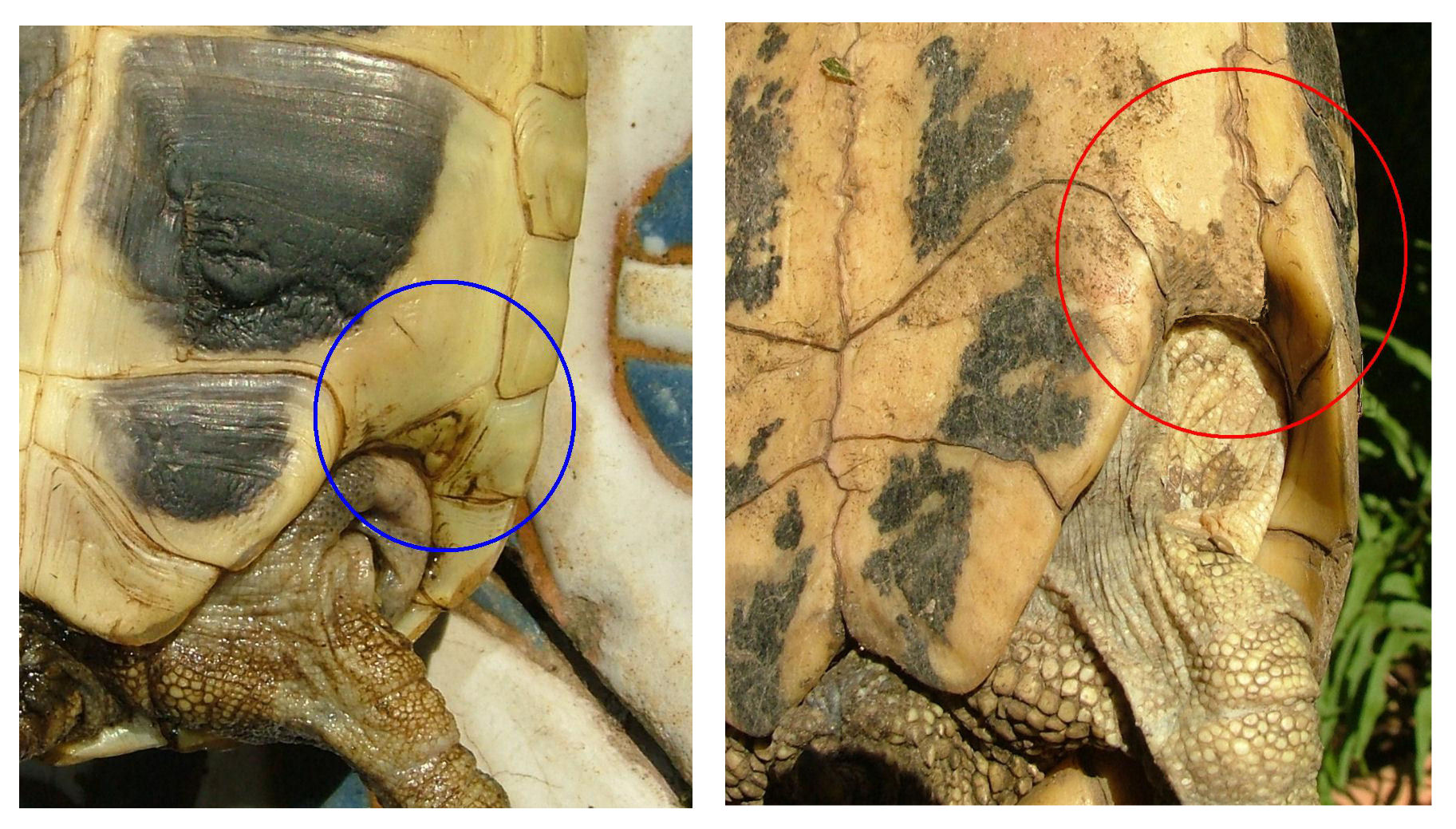
Female T. h. boettgeri (left) and T. h. hercegovinensis tail openings

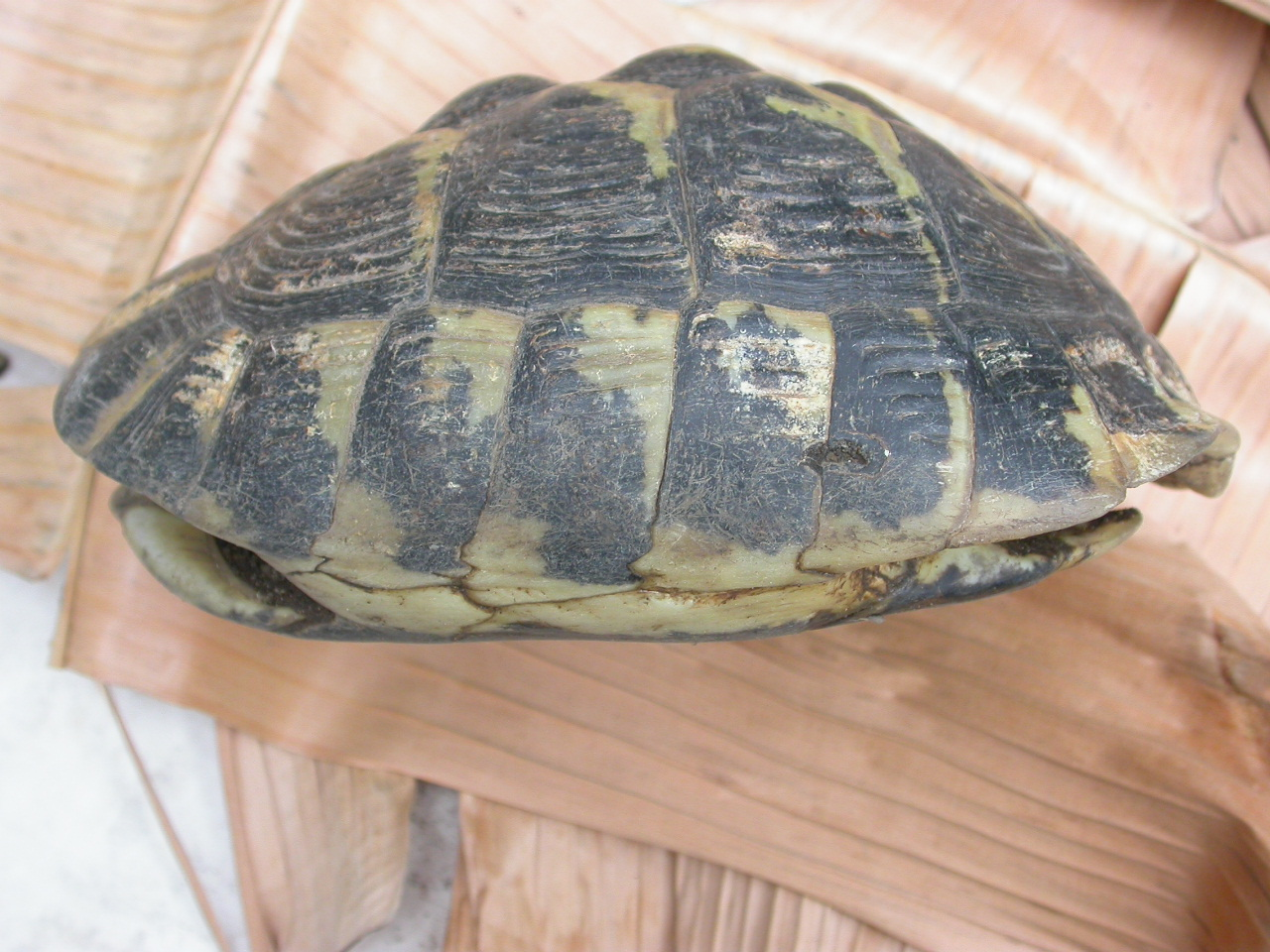
Female T. h. peloponnesica

== Geographic range ==
Testudo hermanni can be found throughout southern Europe. The western population (T. h. hermanni) is found in eastern Spain, southern France, the Balearic Islands, Corsica, Sardinia, Sicily, southern and central Italy (Tuscany). The eastern population (T. h. boettgeri ) is found in Serbia, Kosovo, North Macedonia, Romania, Bulgaria, Albania, Turkey and Greece, while T. h. hercegovinensis populates the coasts of Bosnia and Herzegovina, Croatia, and Montenegro.

The oldest known evidence for T. hermanni on Sardinia is a fossil from the early Pleistocene of Monte Tuttavista. However, molecular evidence suggests extant populations of both this species and Emys orbicularis on Sardinia were actually introduced in recent times. Hermann's tortoise was similarly introduced to Cyprus.

== Description ==
Hermann's tortoises are small to medium-sized tortoises from southern Europe. Young animals and some adults have attractive black and yellow-patterned carapaces, although the brightness may fade with age to a less distinct gray, straw, or yellow coloration. They have slightly hooked upper jaws and, like other tortoises, possess no teeth, just strong, horny beaks. Their scaly limbs are greyish to brown, with some yellow markings, and their tails bear a spur (a horny spike) at the tip. Adult males have particularly long and thick tails, and well-developed spurs, distinguishing them from females.

The eastern subspecies T. h. boettgeri is much larger than the western T. h. hermanni, reaching sizes up to 28 cm (11 in) in length. A specimen of this size may weigh 3–4 kg (6.6–8.8 lb). T. h. hermanni rarely grows larger than 18 cm (7.1 in). Some adult specimens are as small as 7 cm (2.8 in).

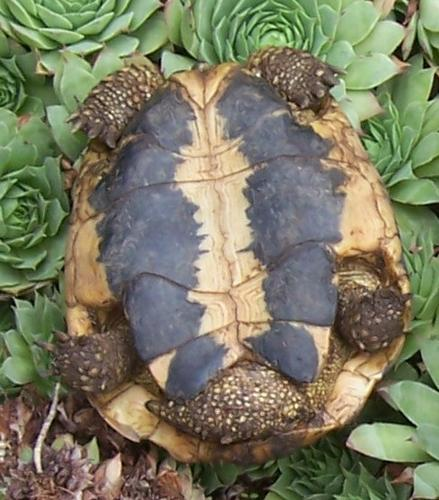
Male of T. h. hermanni

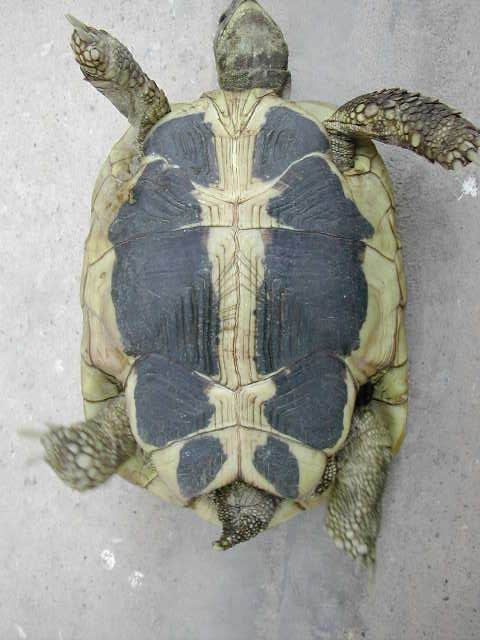
Female of T. h. hermanni

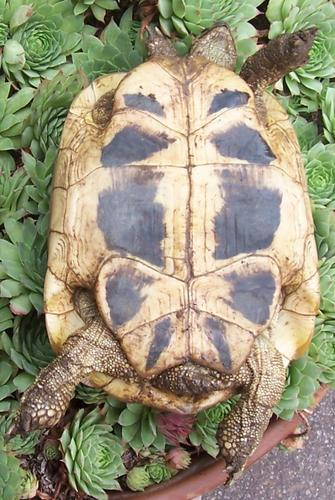
Female of T. h. boettgeri

== Ecology ==
Early in the morning, the animals leave their nightly shelters, which are usually hollows protected by thick bushes or hedges, to bask in the sun and warm their bodies. They then roam about the Mediterranean meadows of their habitat in search of food. They determine which plants to eat by the sense of smell. In captivity, they eat a variety of wildflowers, however care must be taken regarding which are made available, as some flowers such as buttercups are toxic to them. Certain plants such as dandelion and kale are high in oxalic acid, which can build up over time causing renal failure, it is therefore important to carefully monitor their diet and give a varied selection of wildflower leaves. All pre-prepared food pellets are bad for Hermann's tortoises, proving addictive, often resulting in unnatural growth rates and the refusal to eat natural foods. Certain foods may prove toxic despite the tortoises enjoyment of them, including legumes, tomatoes and cabbage. The animals eat small amounts of fruits as supplementary nutrition, however this should only be given occasionally.

Around midday, the sun becomes too hot for the tortoises, so they return to their hiding places. They have a good sense of direction to enable them to return. Experiments have shown they also possess a good sense of time, the position of the sun, the magnetic lines of the earth, and for landmarks. In the late afternoon, they leave their shelters again and return to feeding.

In late February, Hermann's tortoises emerge from under bushes or old rotting wood, where they spend the winter months hibernating, buried in a bed of dead leaves. Immediately after surfacing from their winter resting place, Hermann's tortoises commence courtship and mating. Courtship is a rough affair for the female, which is pursued, rammed, and bitten by the male, before being mounted. Aggression is also seen between rival males during the breeding season, which can result in ramming contests.

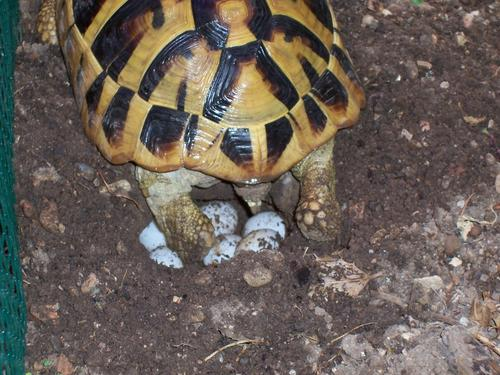
A female of T. h. boettgeri subspecies laying eggs in soil pit

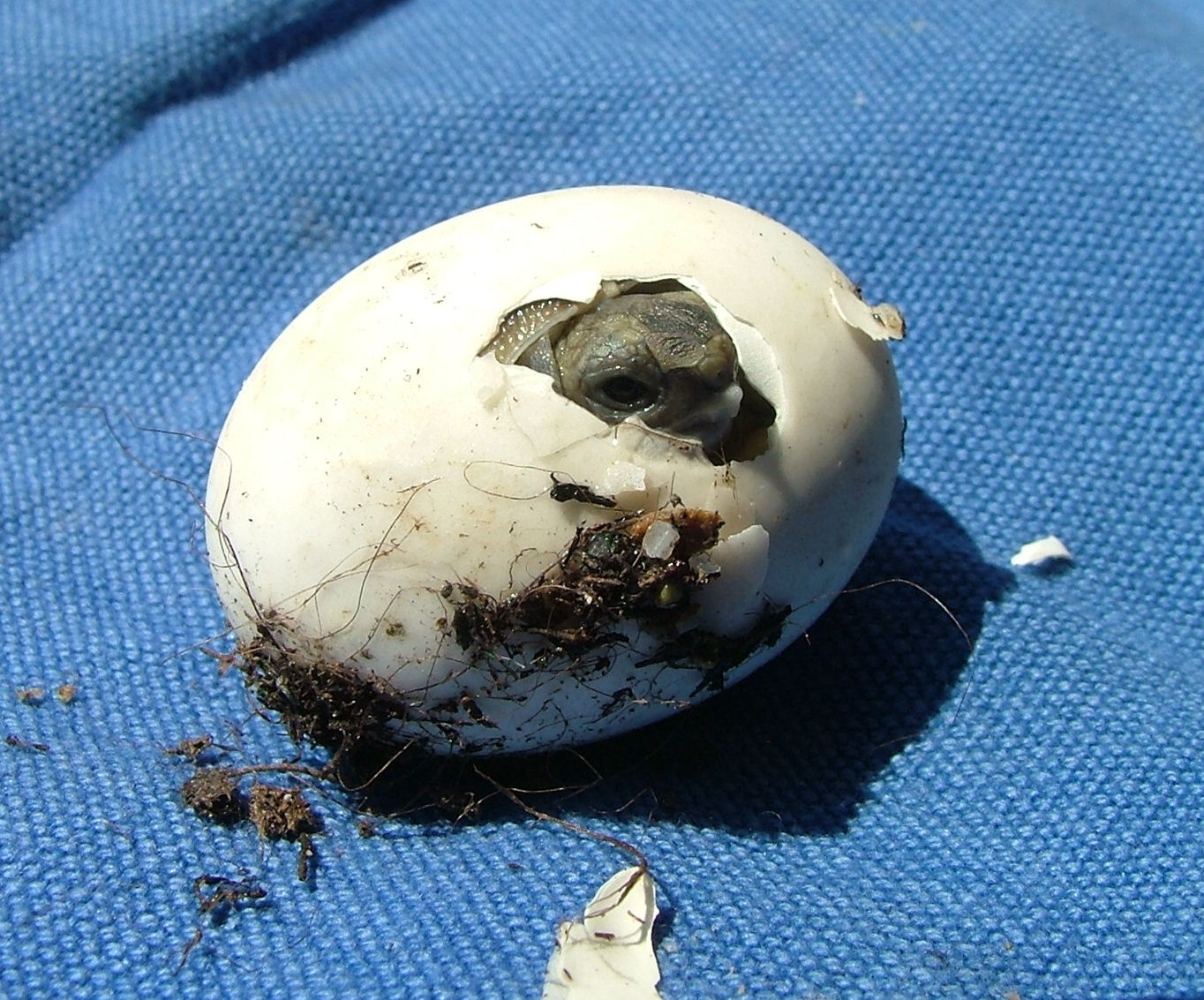
A hatchling of T. h. hermanni

Between May and July, female Hermann's tortoises deposit between two and 12 eggs into flask-shaped nests dug into the soil, up to 10 cm (3.9 in) deep. Most females lay more than one clutch each season. The pinkish-white eggs are incubated for around 90 days and, like many reptiles, the temperature at which the eggs are incubated determines the hatchlings sex. At 26 °C, only males will be produced, while at 30 °C, all the hatchlings will be female. Young Hermann's tortoises emerge just after the start of the heavy autumn rains in early September and spend the first four or five years of their lives within just a few metres of their nests. If the rains do not come, or if nesting took place late in the year, the eggs will still hatch, but the young will remain underground and not emerge until the following spring. Until the age of six or eight, when the hard shell becomes fully developed, the young tortoises are very vulnerable to predators and may fall prey to black rats, badgers, magpies, red foxes, wild boar, and many other animals (such as large snakes and European hedgehogs). If they survive these threats, the longevity of Hermann's tortoises is around 30 years. One rare record of longevity is 31.7 years. Compared to other tortoises (e.g. Testudo graeca), the longevity might be underestimated and many sources are reporting they might live 90 years or more.

Hatching Hermann's tortoise
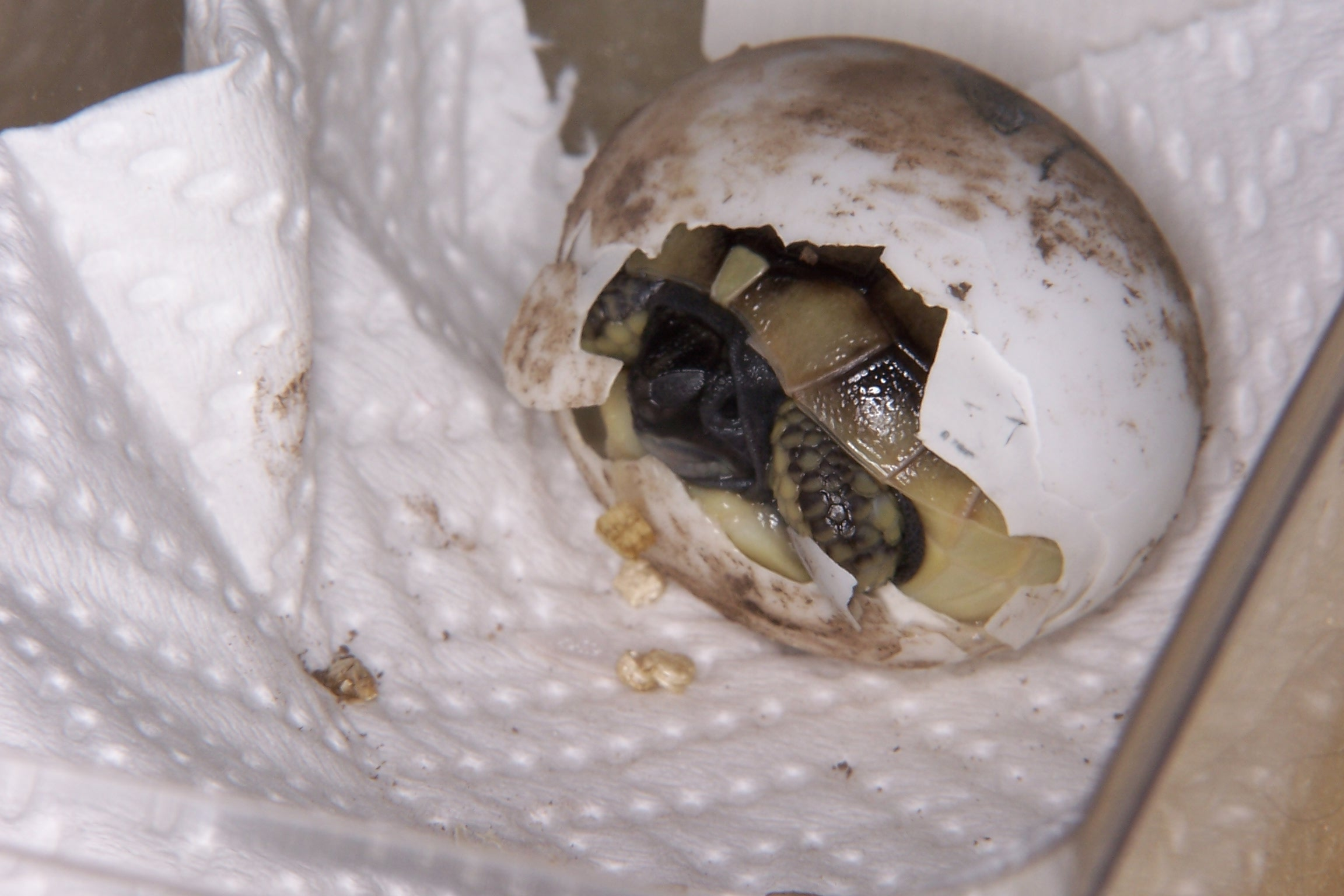
12:02

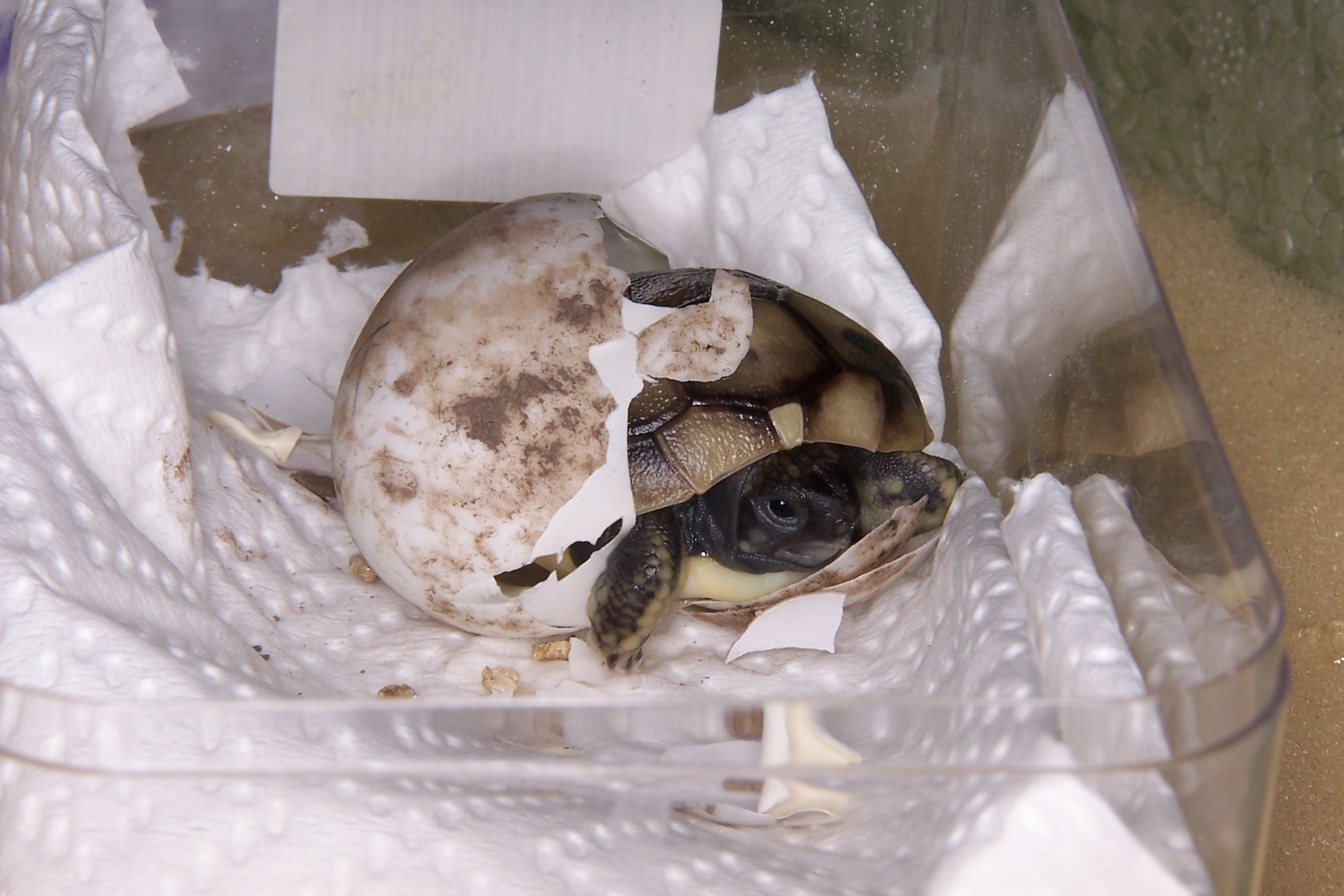
12:32

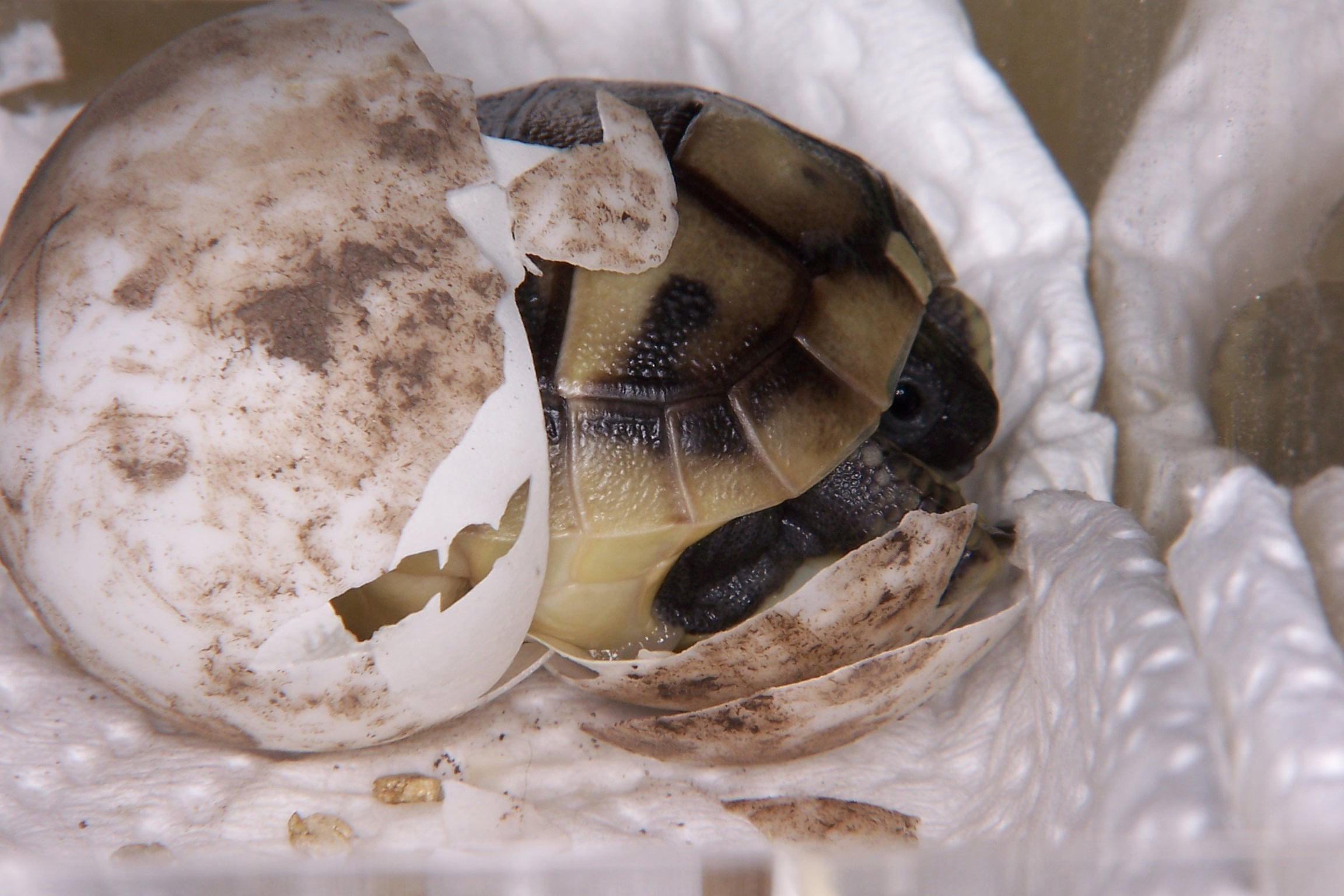
12:42

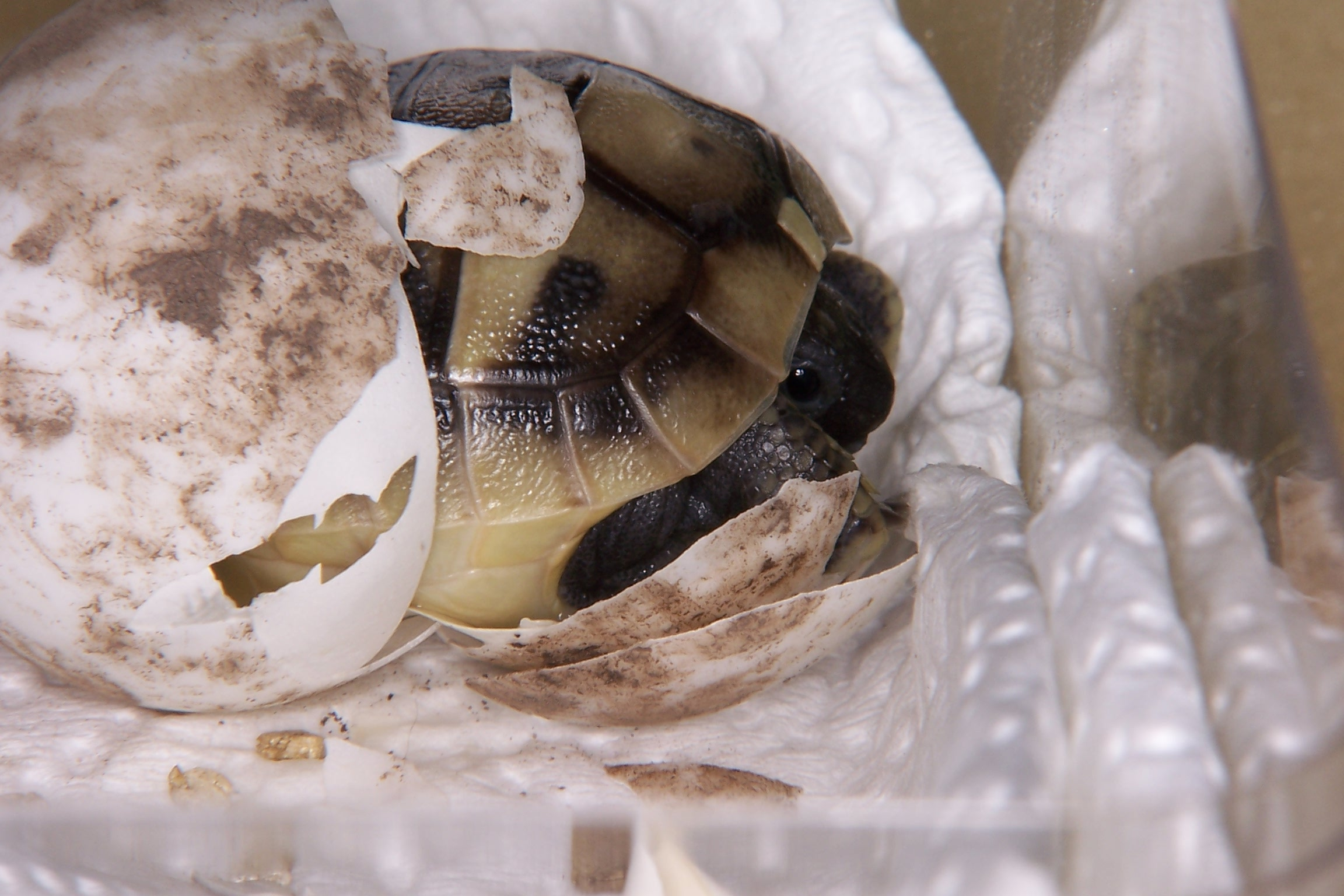
12:46

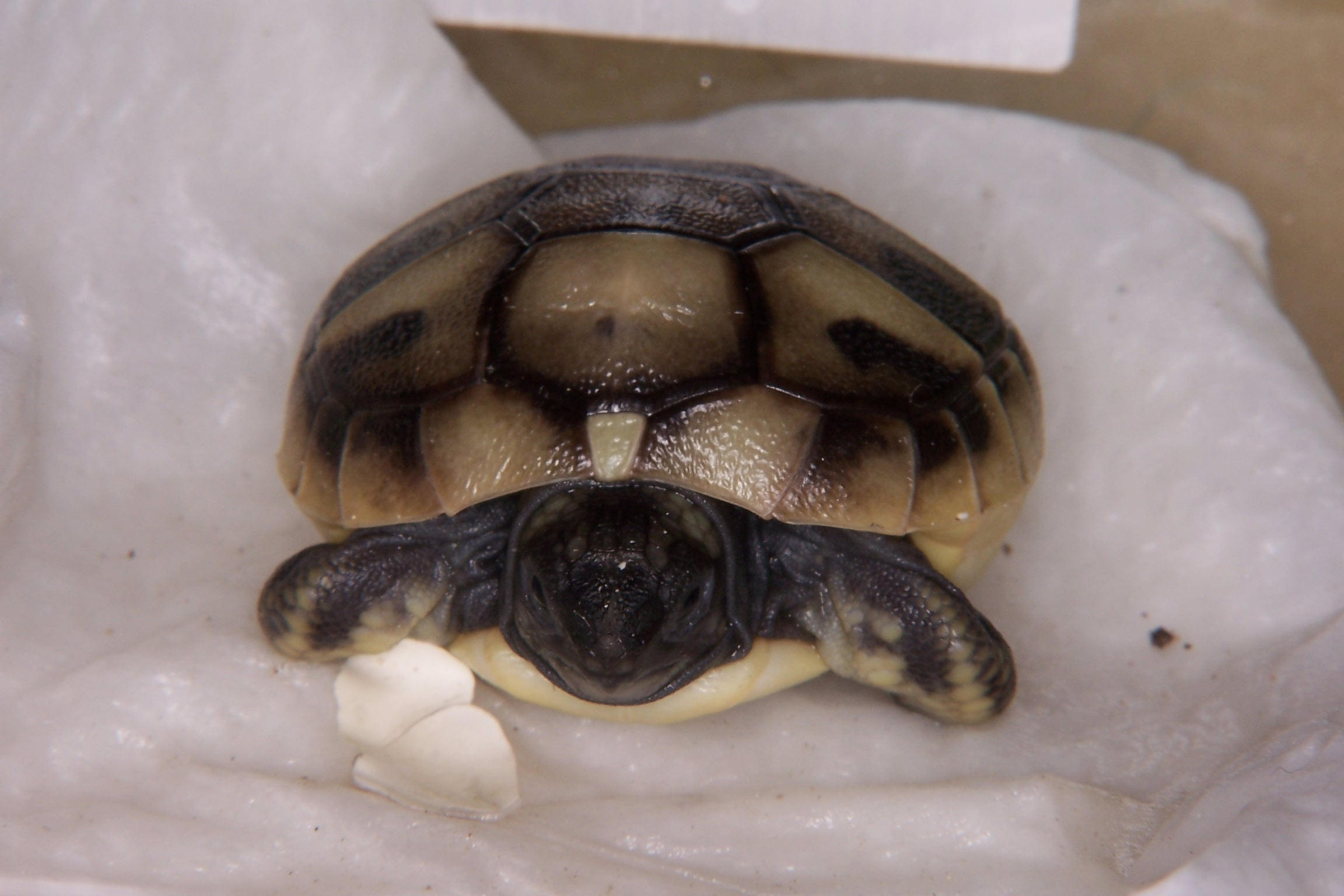
14:47

=== Hibernation ===
In nature, Hermann's tortoises dig their nightly shelters out and spend the relatively mild Mediterranean winters there. During this time, their heart and breathing rates drop notably. Captive bred animals can be kept in the basement in a roomy rodent-proof box with a thick layer of dry leaves. The temperature should be around 5 °C. As an alternative, the box can be stored in a refrigerator. For this method to be used, the refrigerator should be in regular day-to-day use, to permit air flow. During hibernation, the ambient temperature must not fall below zero. Full-grown specimens may sleep four to five months at a time.

== In captivity ==
Hermann's tortoise can be kept indoors with adequate living conditions provided by the owner. It requires a heat lamp set at around 26-35°C or 80-90°F to provide a basking area. At night, they are fine with lower heats such as 15-21°C or 60-70°F. A UVB bulb is also needed to help process and create vitamin D3 and prevents issues such as metabolic bone disease.

== Conservation ==
The species is included in Appendix II of the Convention on International Trade in Endangered Species (CITES) meaning international export/import requires CITES documentation to be obtained and presented to border authorities.

Many ways have been introduced to help conserve the species. A program introduced in 1989 and 1990 reintroduced tortoises to the population, put fences to reduce highway traffic towards the tortoises and more. This was shown to aid in increasing population numbers by reintroducing other tortoises of the same species.

== See also ==
- Mediterranean tortoise
- List of reptiles of Italy
- Jackson ratio
