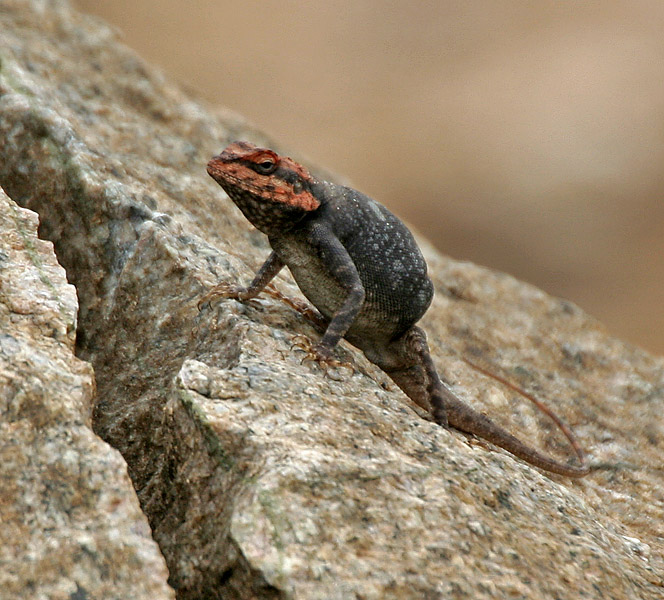
- Psammophis blanfordanus, in Hyderabad, Andhra Pradesh, India

Conservation status
- Least Concern (IUCN 3.1)

Scientific classification
- Kingdom: Animalia
- Phylum: Chordata
- Class: Reptilia
- Order: Squamata
- Suborder: Iguania
- Family: Agamidae
- Genus: Psammophilus
- Species: P. blanfordanus

Binomial name
- Psammophilus blanfordanus (Stoliczka, 1871)

Synonyms
- Charasia blanfordana Stoliczka, 1871; Charasia blanfordiana [sic] Boulenger, 1885; Psammophilus blanfordanus — M.A. Smith, 1935

= Blanford's rock agama =

Species of lizard

Blanford's rock agama (Psammophilus blanfordanus) is species of lizard in the family Agamidae. The species is endemic to Peninsular India. One of two species in the genus, P. blanfordanus is found mainly to the east of the distribution of P. dorsalis. Unlike the other species, the male P. blanfordanus in breeding season has the red body color restricted to the head and lacks the broad dorsal stripe.

== Etymology ==
Both the specific name, blanfordanus, and the common name, Blanford's rock agama, are in honor of English naturalist William Thomas Blanford (1832–1905), member of the Geological Survey of India.

== Description ==
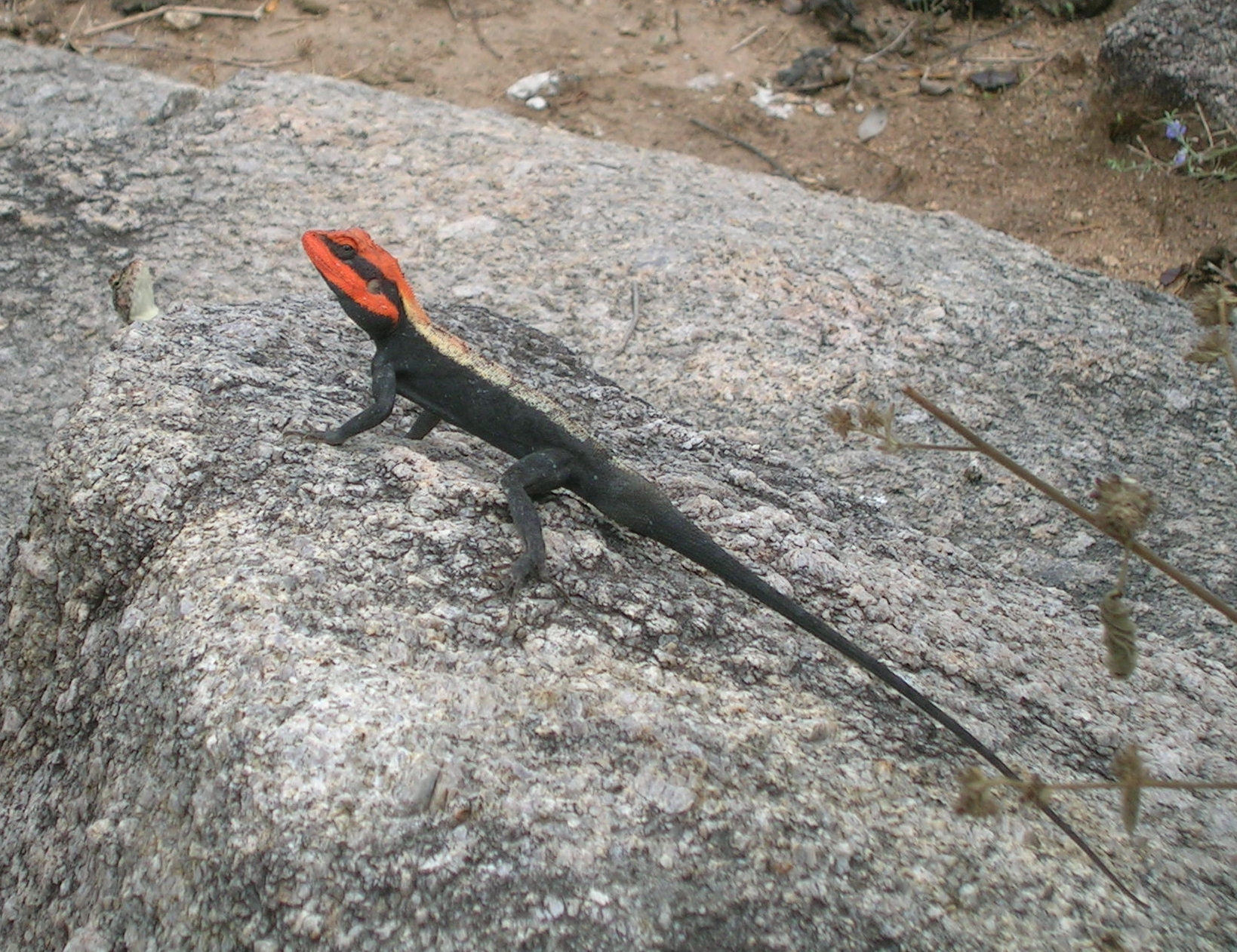
Male in breeding colours

Although very similar to P. dorsalis, a specimen of P. blanfordanus can be separated by several features. P. blanfordanus has a deeper fold on the front of the humerus. The scales on the body are a little larger, and number from 80 to 100 round the middle of the body. The dorsal scales appear keeled and imbricated. When the hind leg is stretched forward and held along the body, it reaches the eye or extends beyond it. Often, a small spine is found behind the edge of the brow-ridge of the eye, and a few enlarged scales are scattered on the sides. Young lizards are olive-brown above, spotted or marbled with brown very similar to the female, but often have a series of large, lozenge-shaped, dark brown spots with pale centres on the back and tail. The adult male is much like P. dorsalis, but in the summer breeding season, the head and anterior part of the body of the males become scarlet or red while the posterior parts are nearly black.

P. blanfordanus is found mainly on rocks. The male displays by head nodding.

Snout-to-vent length (SVL) is about 10 cm (3.9 in), and the tail is about 20 cm (7.9 in) long. Females are slightly smaller than males.

== Behaviour ==
P. blanfordanus spends most of its time resting or basking under the sun. Excess heat causes it to rest inside water holes to decrease overall body temperature.

== Diet ==
The diet of P. blanfordanus consists of insects.

== Reproduction ==
P. blanfordanus is oviparous.

== Distribution ==
P. blanfordanus is common on many of the hills from Chota Nagpur, as high as Parasnath Hill to 4,500 feet (1,400 m), Madhya Pradesh and extending south along the Godavari Districts, hills of the Eastern Ghats. The southernmost record appears to be Talayar in Travancore, where a specimen was collected by Harold S. Ferguson at 7,000 feet (2,100 m).
