= Sunning (behaviour) =

Thermoregulatory animal behaviour

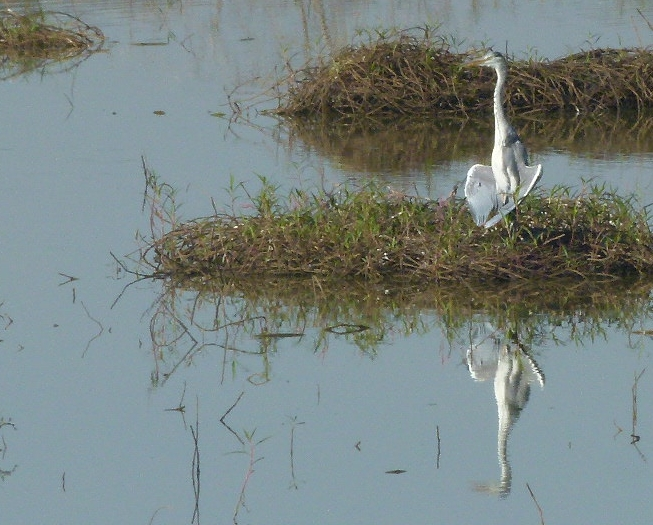
A grey heron in delta-wing posture, facing the Sun

Sunning or basking, sometimes also known as sunbathing, is a thermoregulatory or comfort behaviour used by animals, especially birds, reptiles, and insects, to help raise their body temperature, reduce the energy needed for temperature maintenance or to provide comfort. They may also have additional functions of ridding animals of ectoparasites, bacteria, or excess moisture.

== Birds ==
Birds adopt special postures when sunning, these may include spreading out their feathers, flattening their body on soil, showing either their upper parts to the sun or facing the sun. Some authors separate the behaviours into sun-basking and sun-exposure – the former term used when the behaviour is strictly thermoregulatory in function while the latter term may be more appropriate if the behaviour serves functions other than raising body temperature.

In some species, the sunbathing posture is adopted in very hot weather and the birds sometimes stay in close contact with hot soil. Birds may fluff up their feathers, expose their preen-gland, lean to one side and so on. The wings may be turned inside out as in the boobies or held in delta-wing positions as in herons and storks or held outspread as by vultures. Swallows were observed to indulge in the activity for very short durations and this appeared to induce hyperthermia leading to them gaping to cool. Observers have suggested that the purpose might not be thermoregulation in these cases. A theory that birds obtained vitamin D by allowing precursors in the preen-gland secretions to be converted by ultraviolet radiation is considered to be unsupported. Large soaring birds such as Gyps vultures may use sun-bathing postures to help in stiffening their feathers as they used such postures only prior to flying and not during the early morning hours. Another theory is that ectoparasites may be killed or forced to move away from inaccessible parts of the body to more accessible areas where they can be removed through preening. This is supported by the observation that sunning is often followed by preening. Feather-degrading bacteria are known to be killed by the action of sunlight.

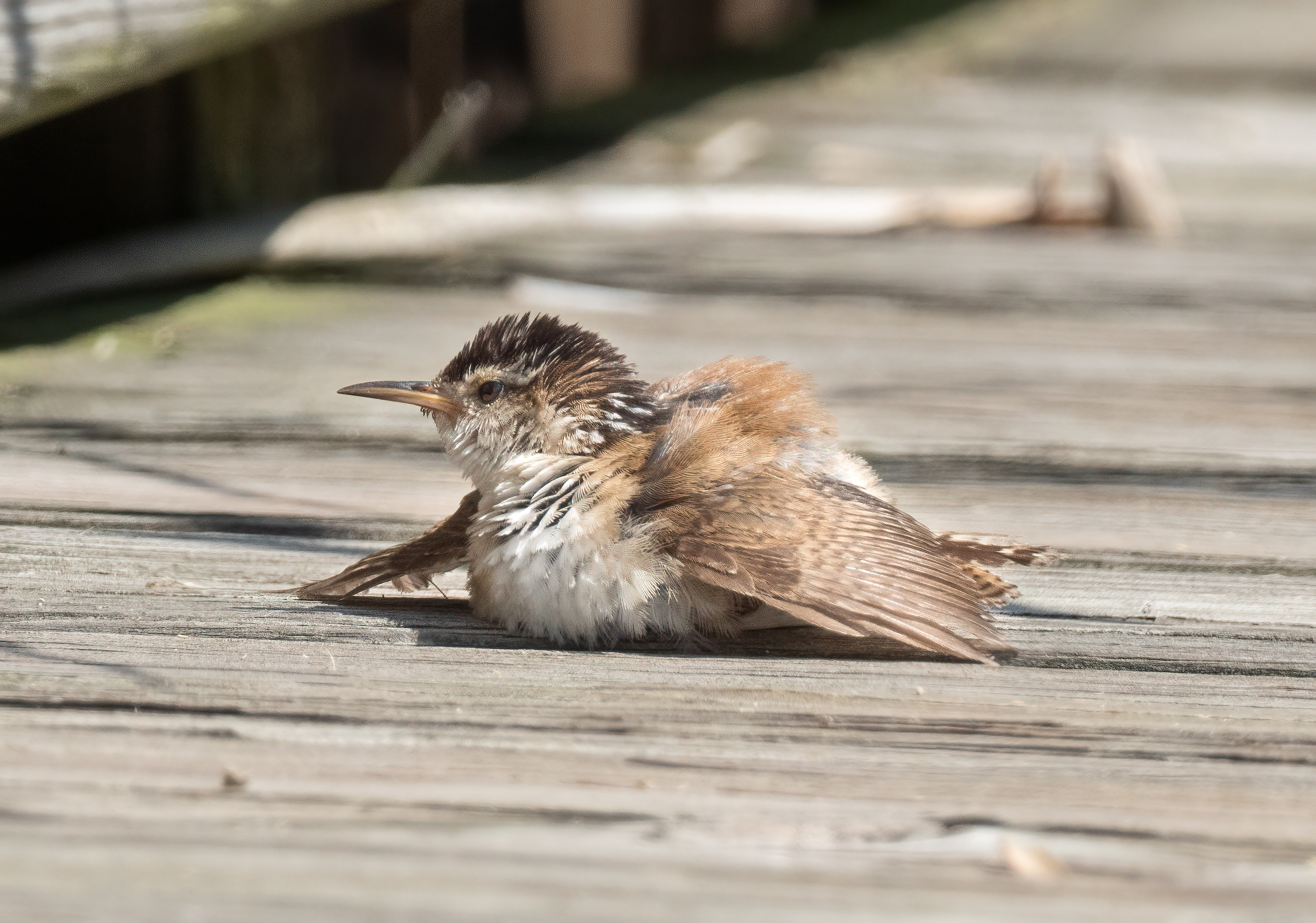
Marsh wren sunbathing

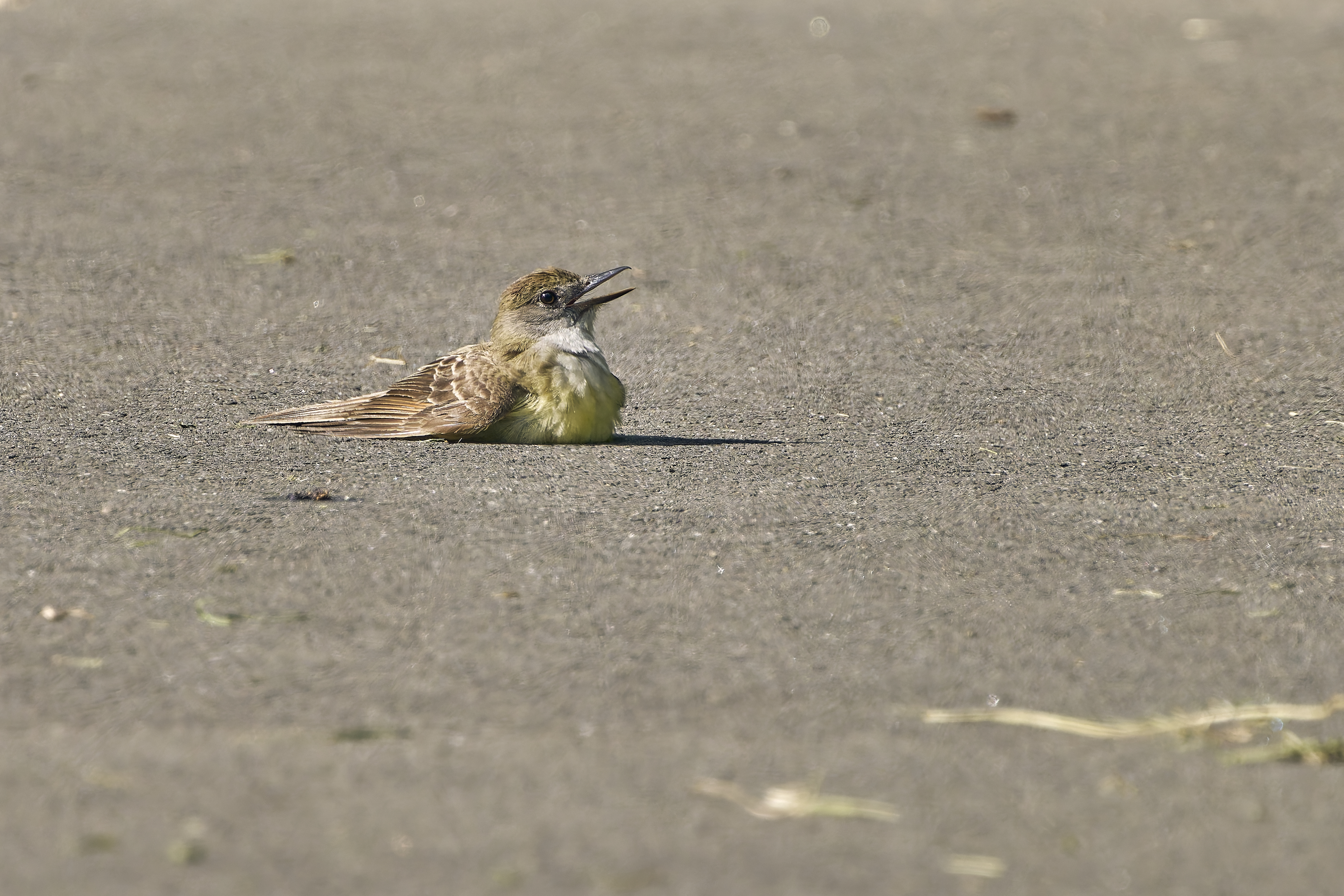
Great crested flycatcher sunbathing

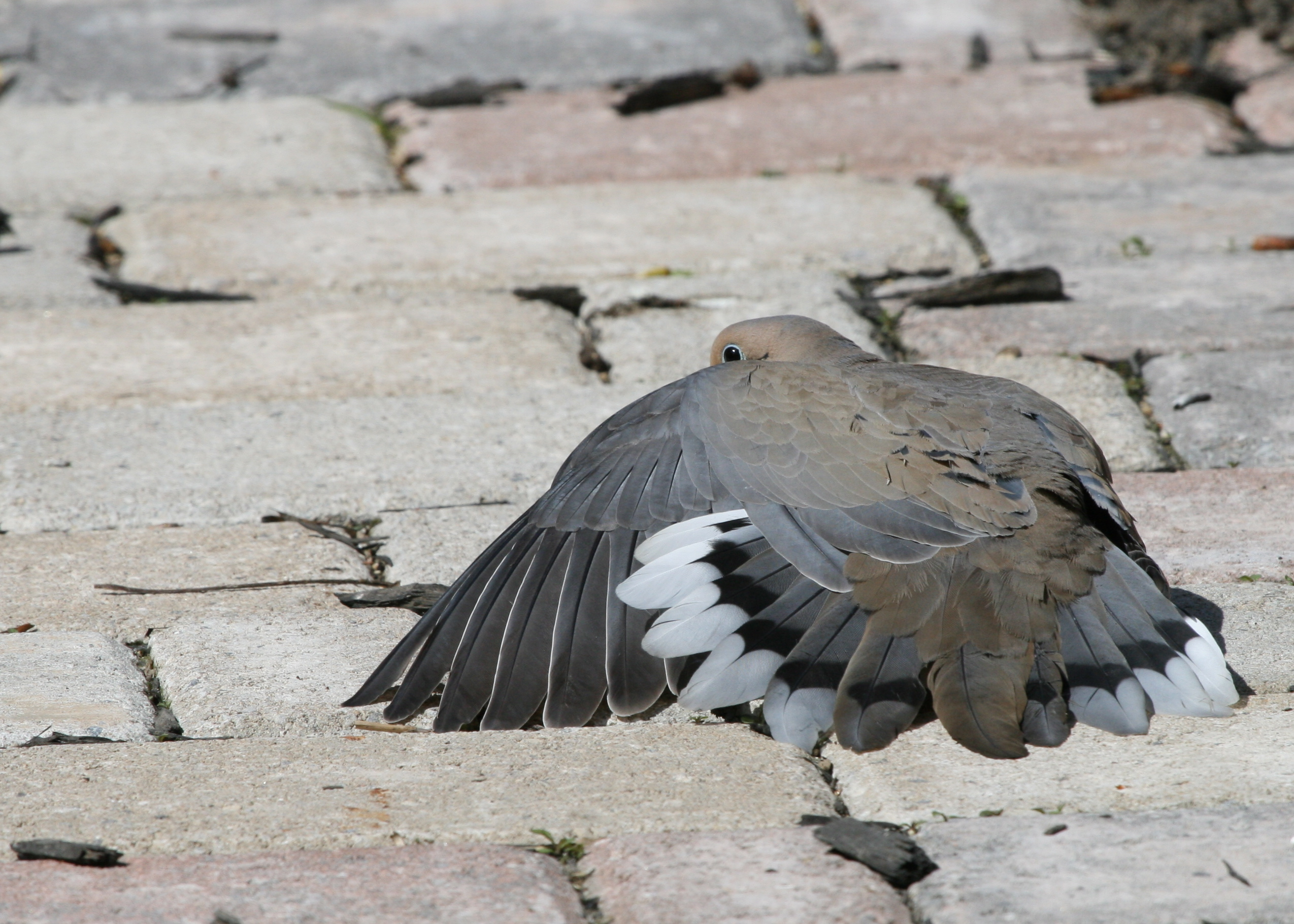
Mourning dove sunbathing

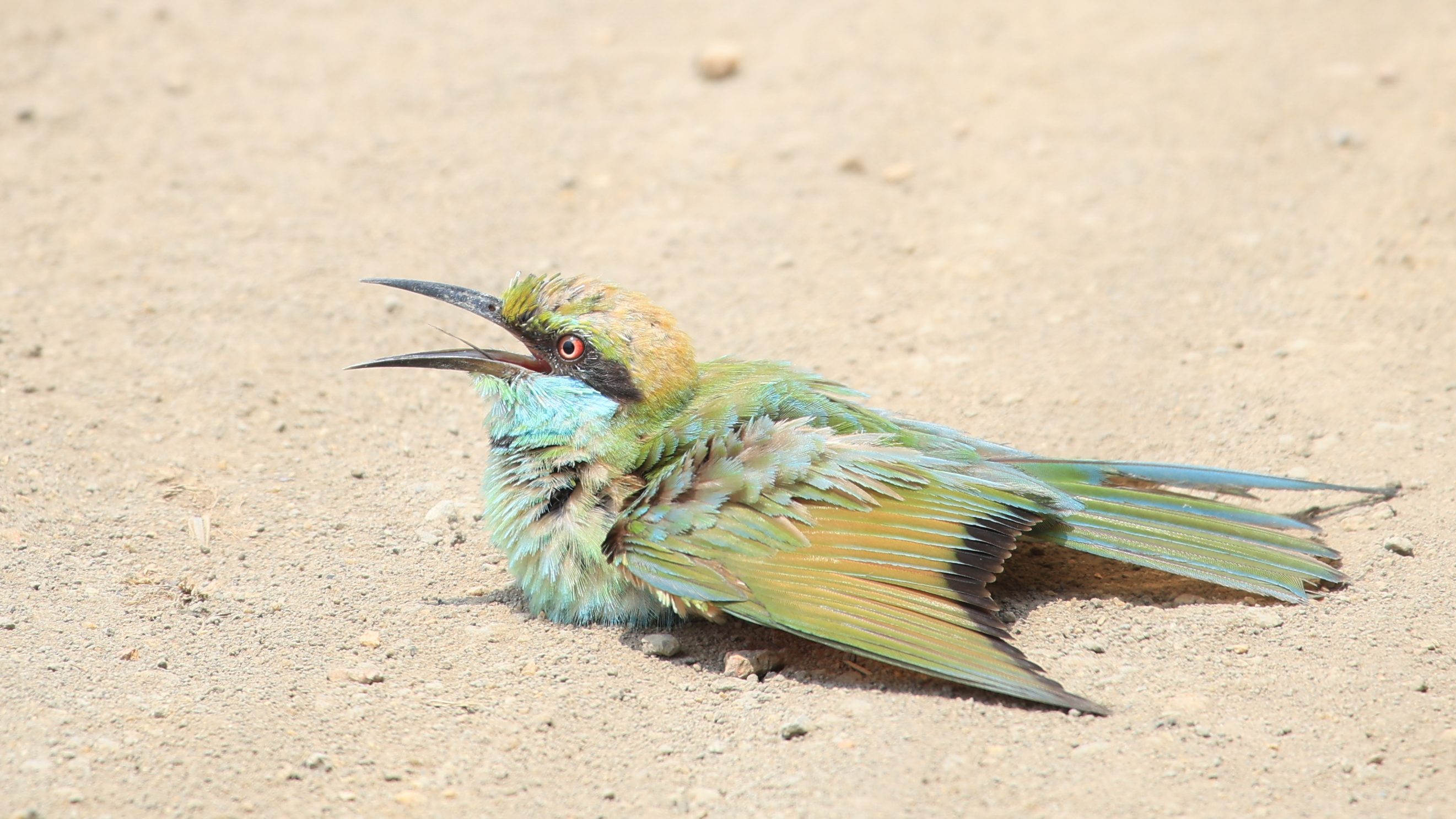
Bee-eater sun bathing in Kottayam

=== Horaltic and delta-wing poses ===
Some bird species sunbathe while perched or standing with their wings spread out; this pose is often referred to as the "horaltic pose", and is most commonly seen in vultures, eagles, cormorants, and some hawks. Other species may stand in a modified horaltic pose sometimes called the "delta-wing pose"; this is when birds have their wings outstretched but drooped to the sides. This pose is most commonly seen in herons and storks.

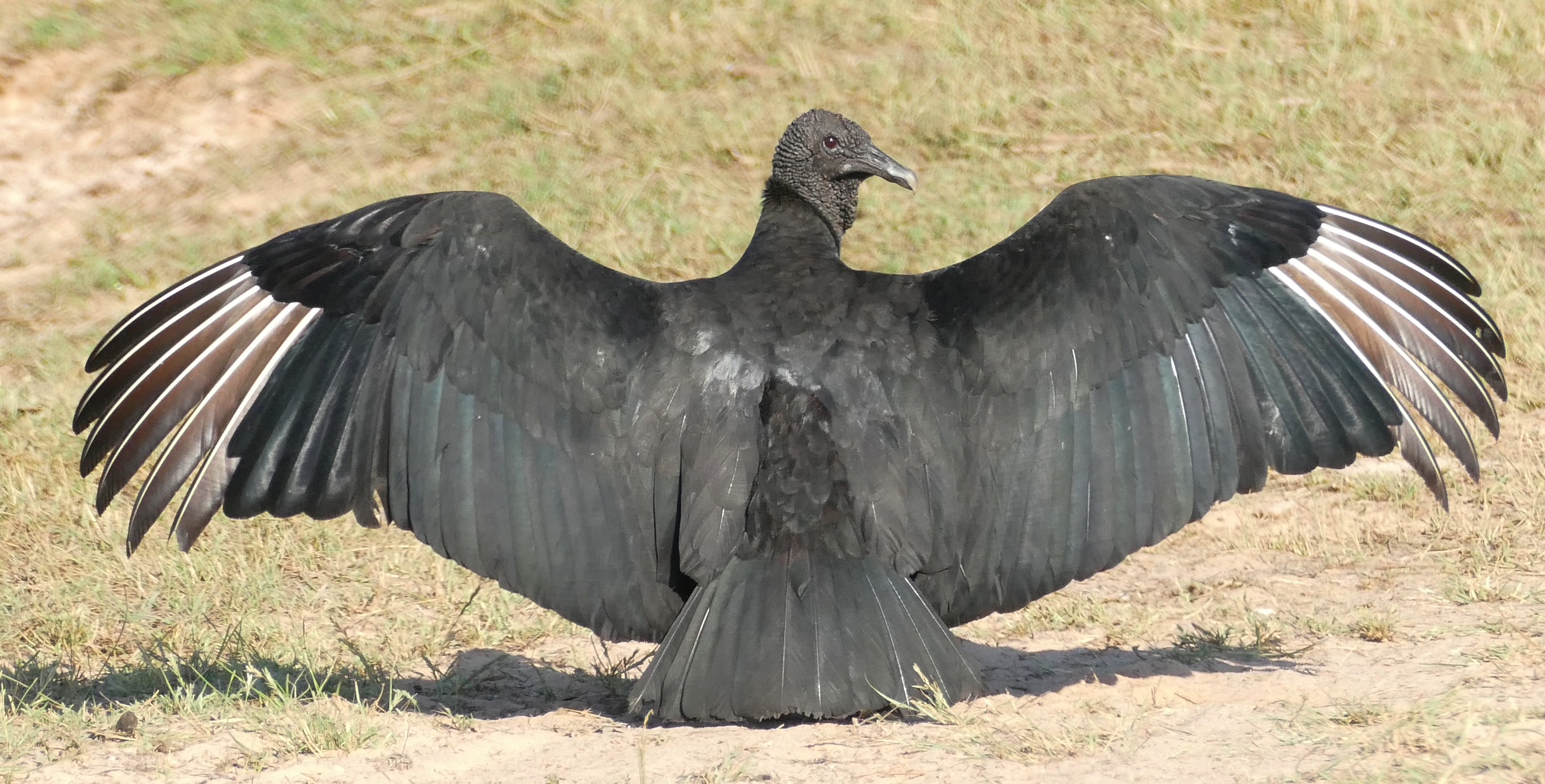
Black vulture in the horaltic pose in the morning sun

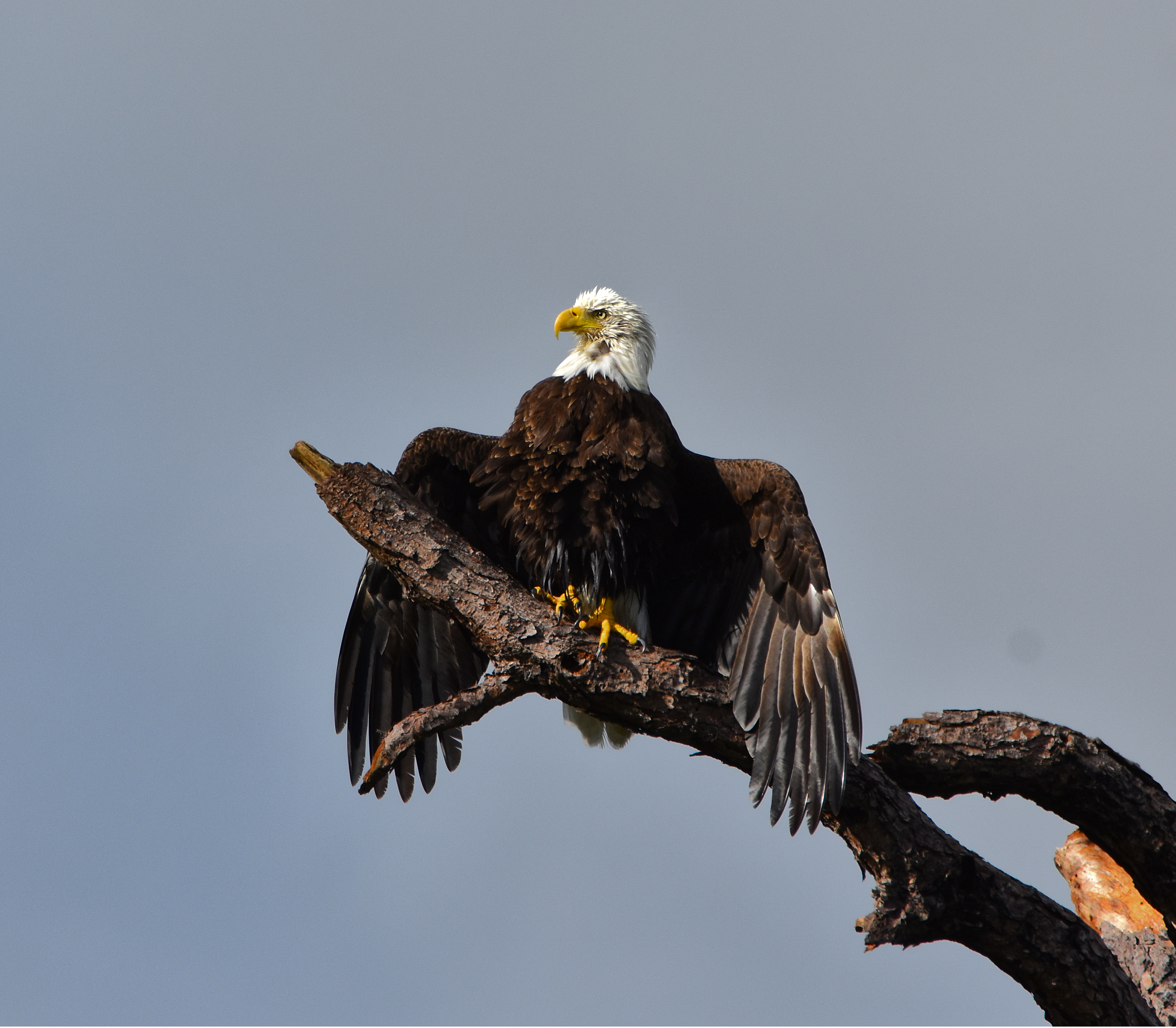
Bald eagle in the horaltic pose

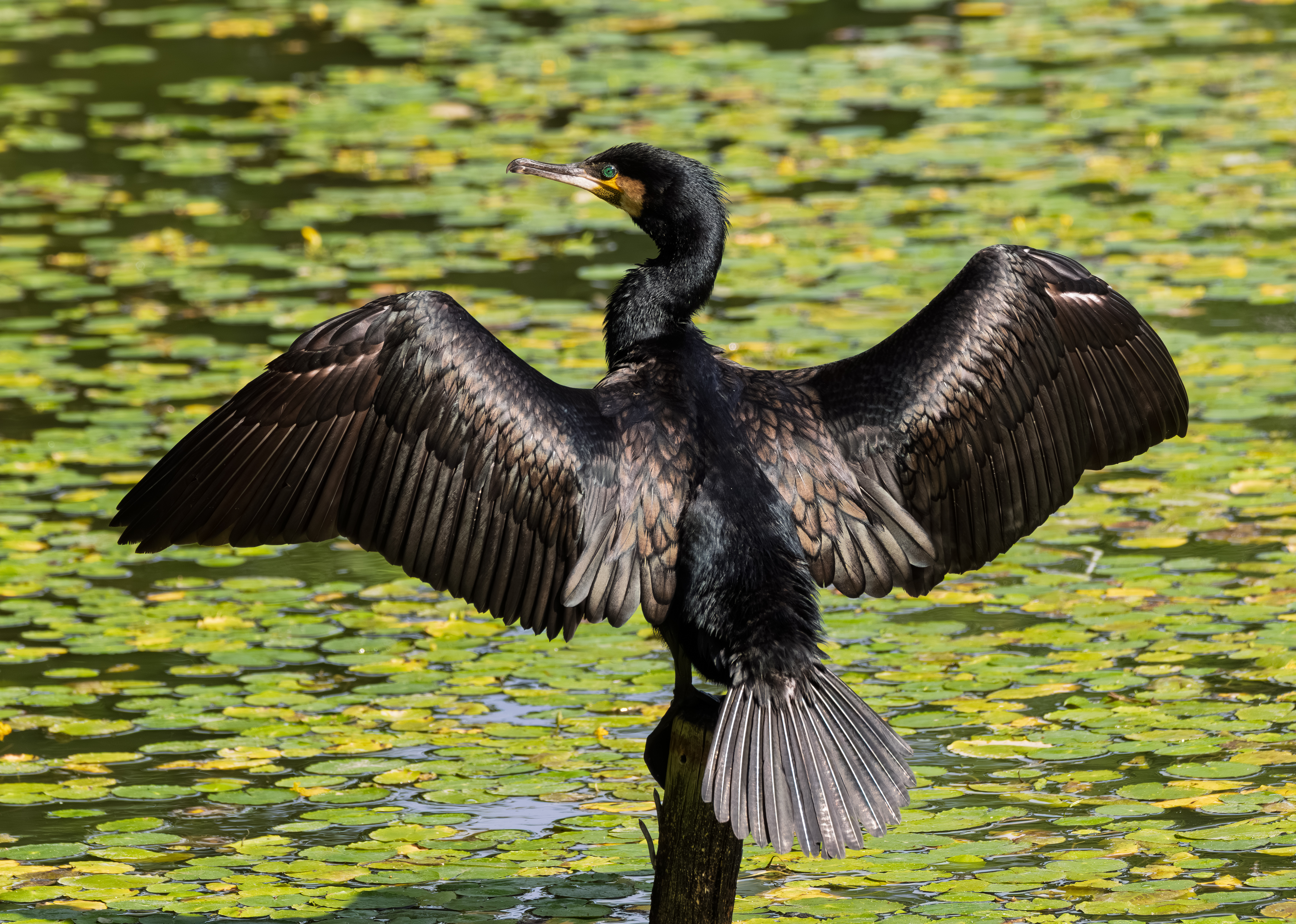
Great cormorant at Tennōji Park in the horaltic pose

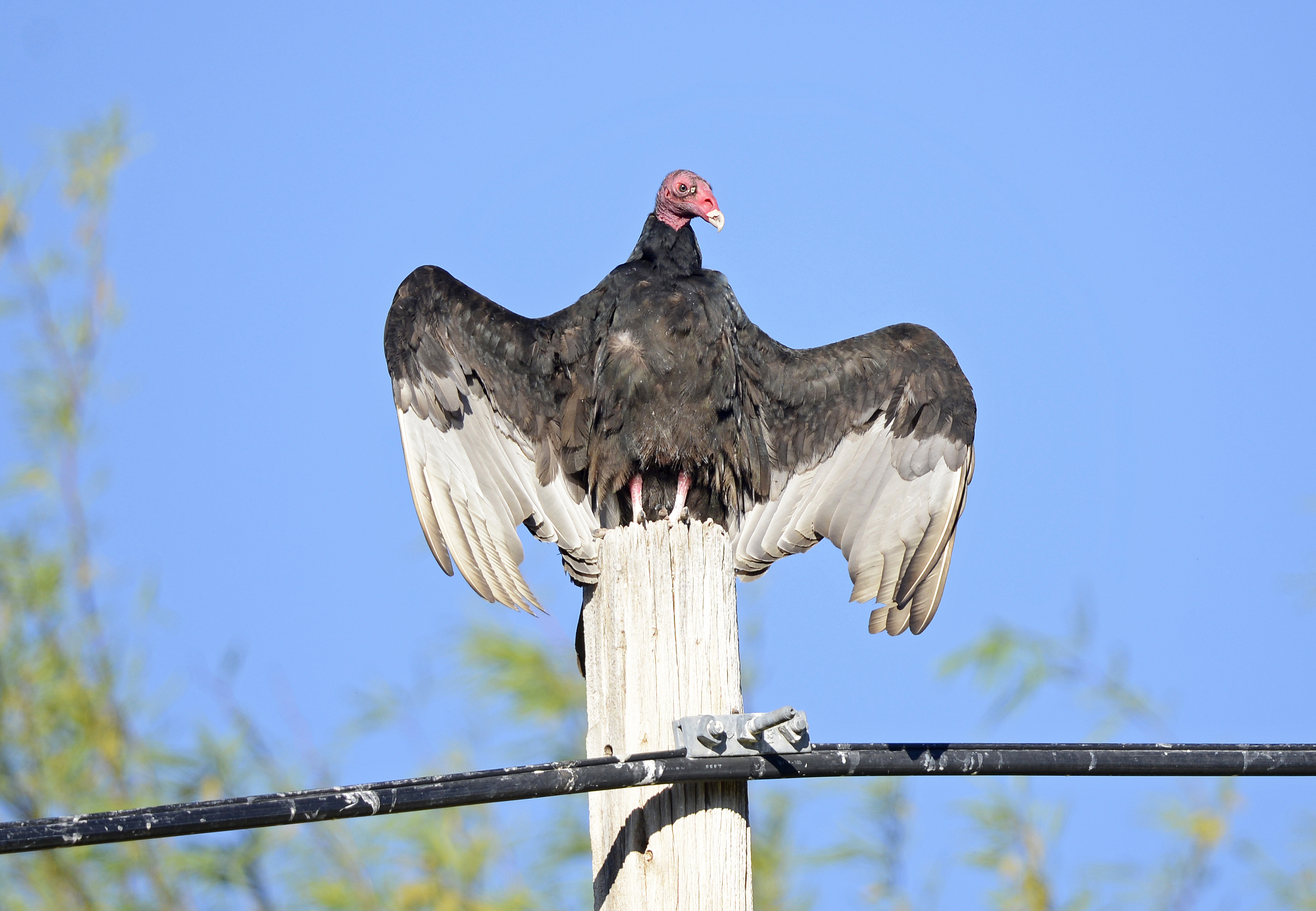
Turkey vulture in the horaltic pose

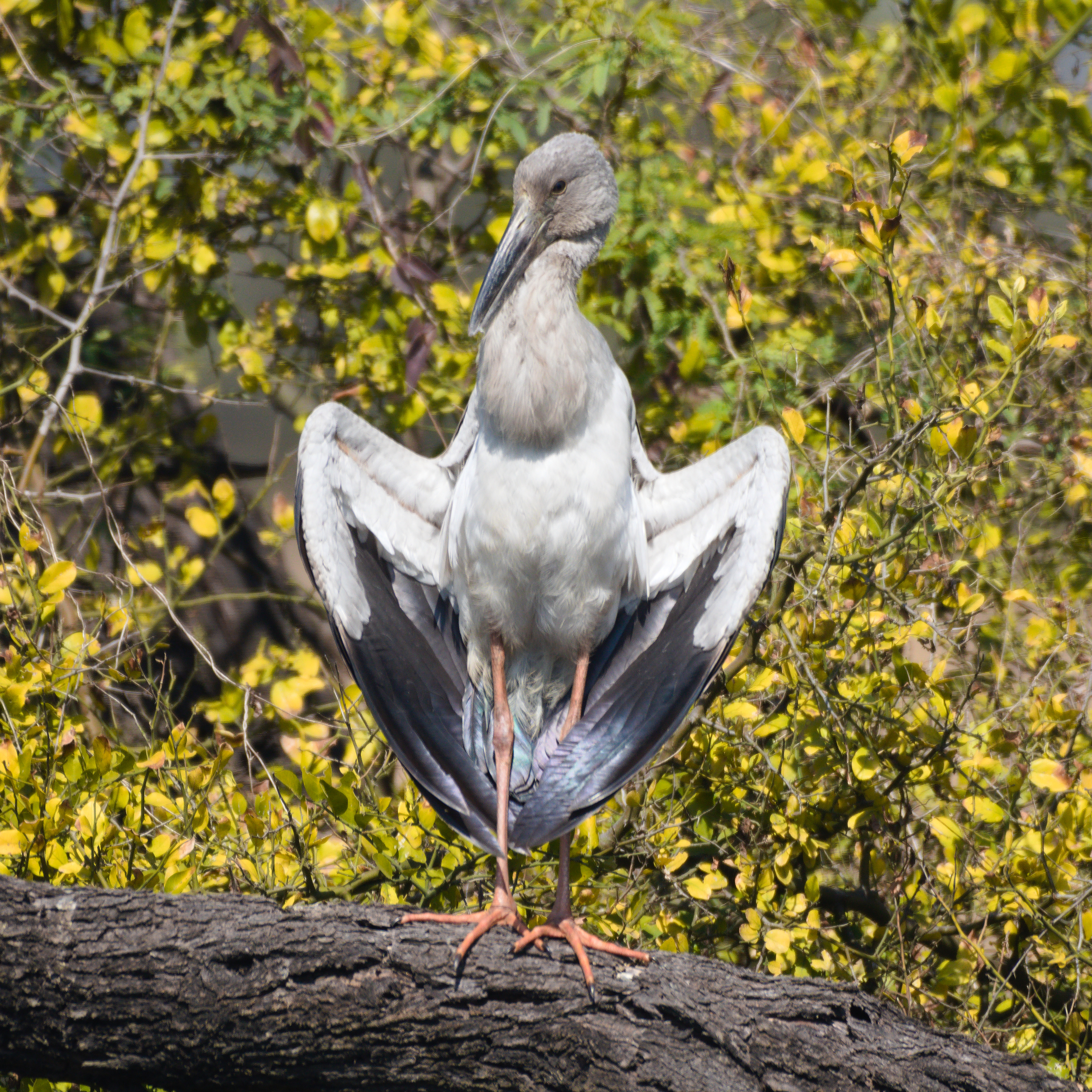
Asian openbill in the delta-wing pose

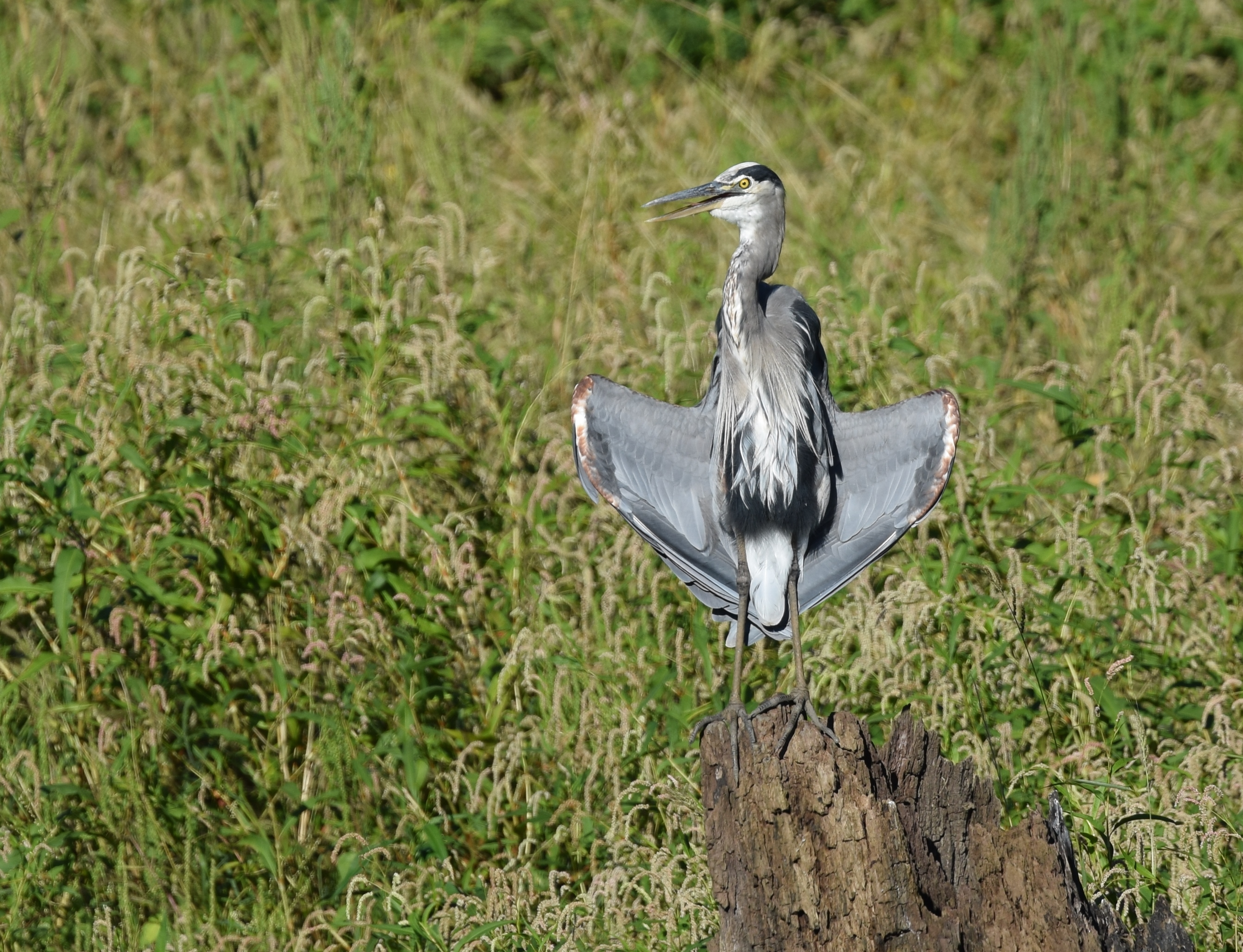
Great blue heron in the delta-wing pose

== Reptiles and amphibians ==
Basking is common to most active diurnal reptiles. Lizards, crocodiles, terrapins, and snakes routinely make use of the morning sun to raise their body temperature. Freshwater turtles and terrapins have been found to bask and raise their body temperature close to the highest temperatures that they can tolerate.

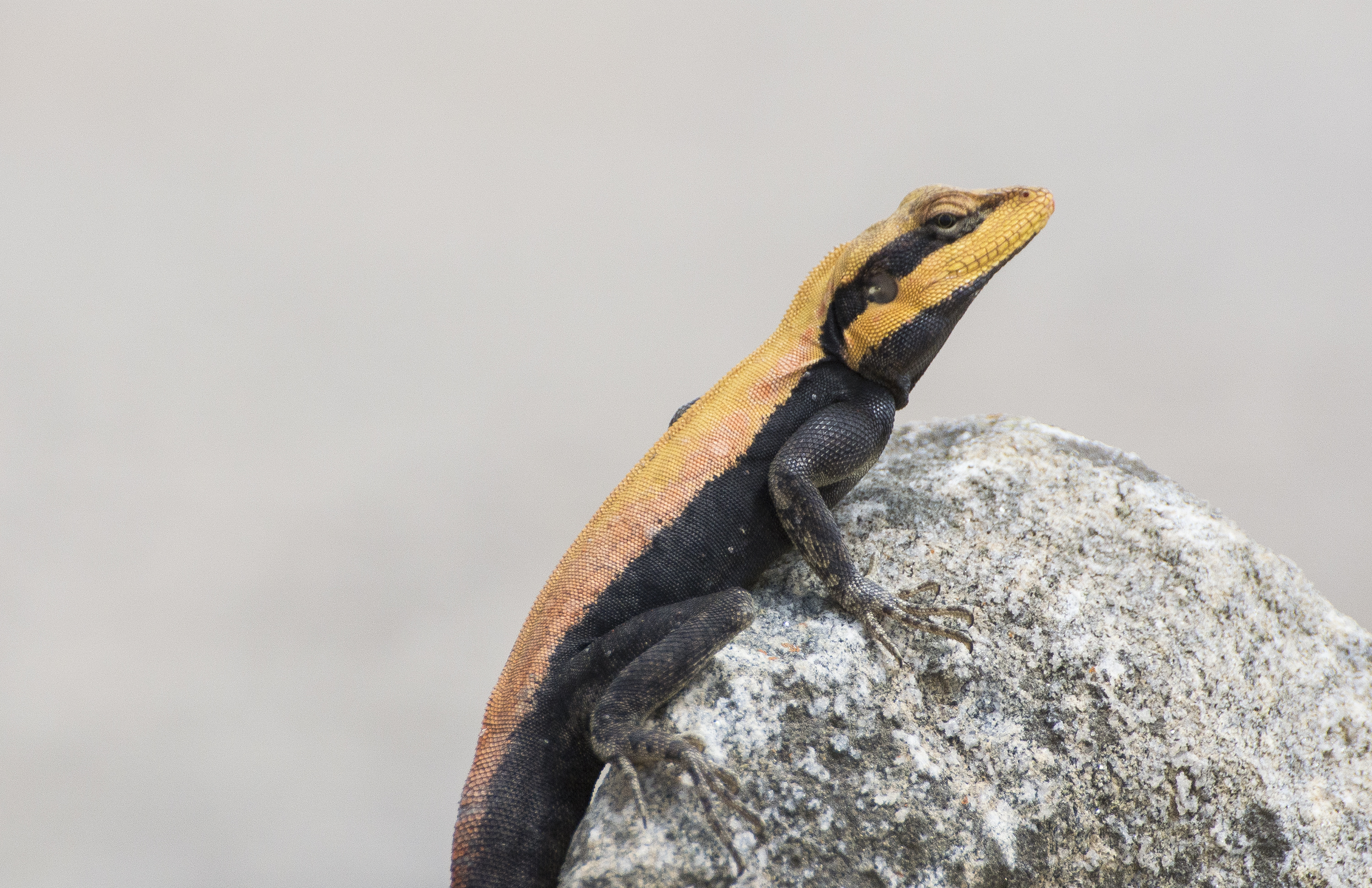
Psammophilus agama basking

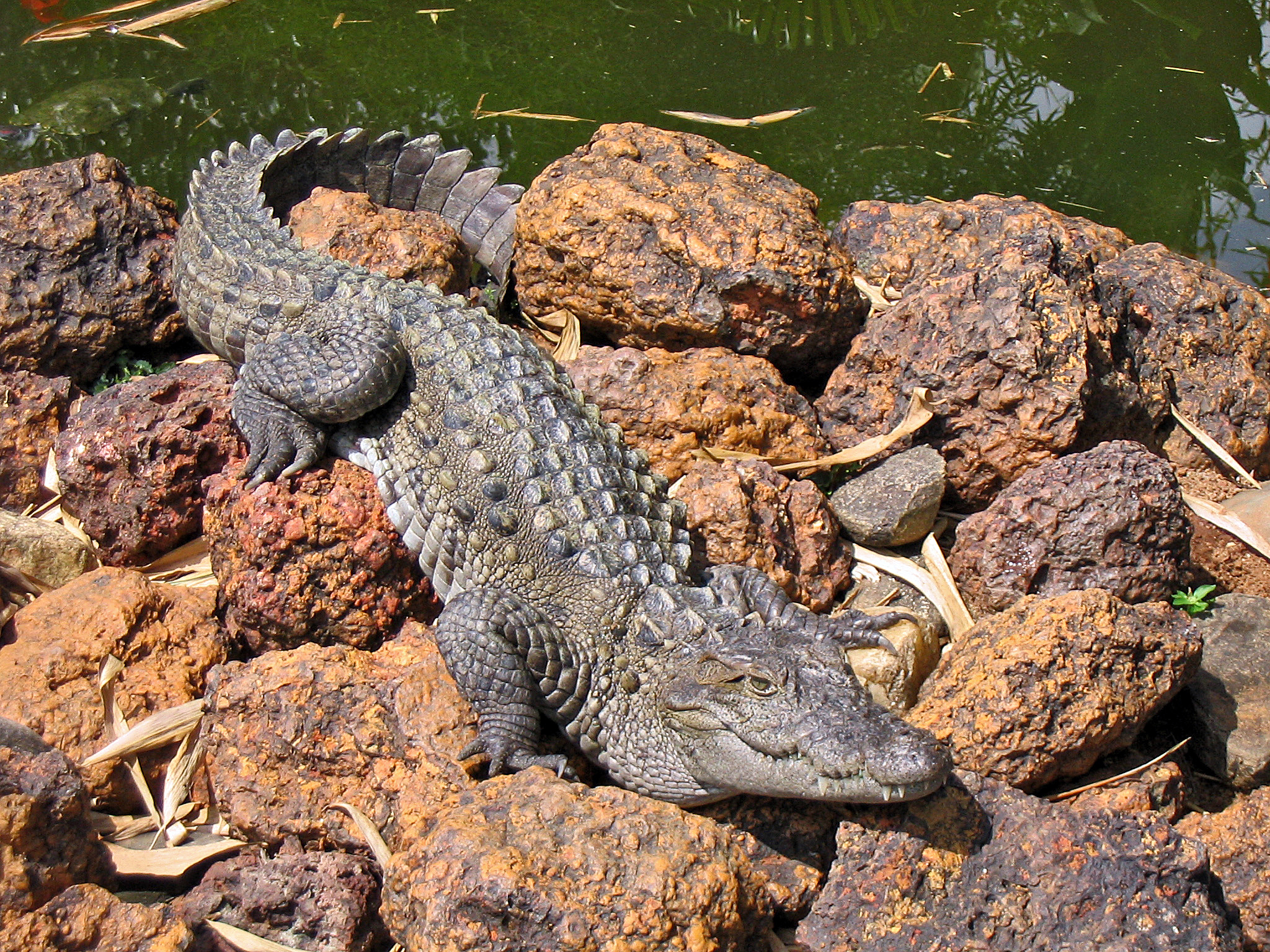
Crocodylus palustris basking

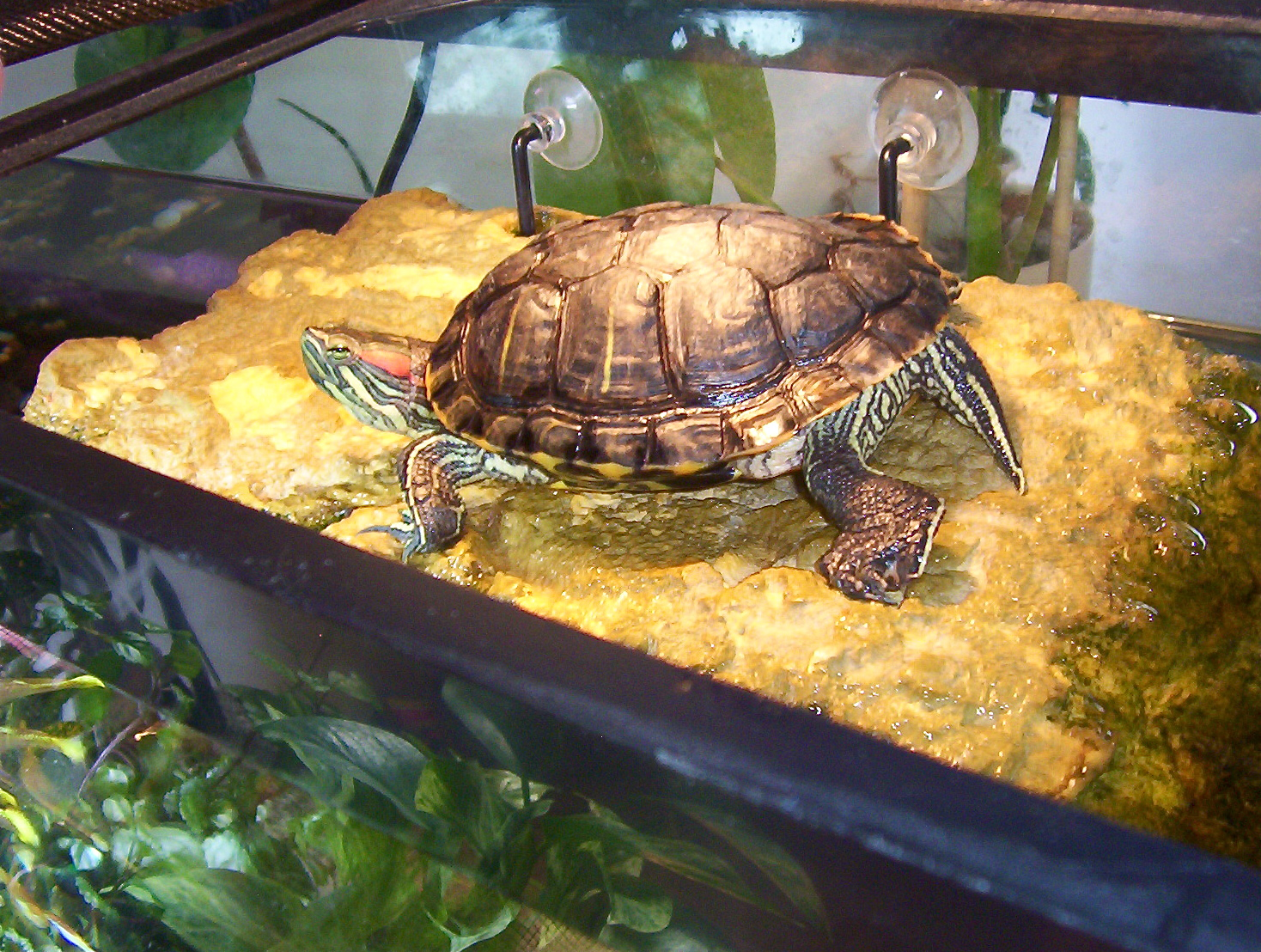
Captive Trachemys scripta elegans basking

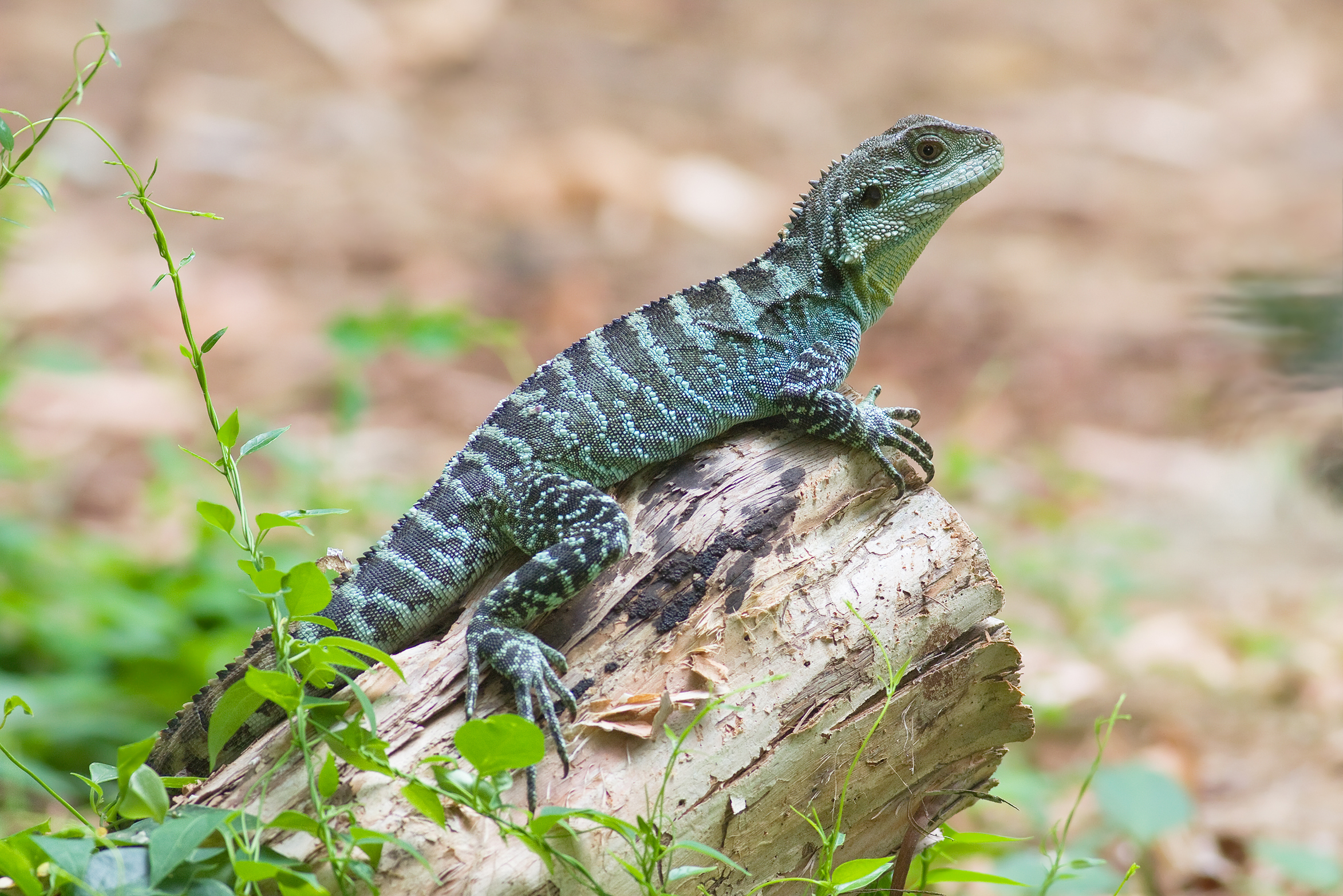
Gippsland water dragon

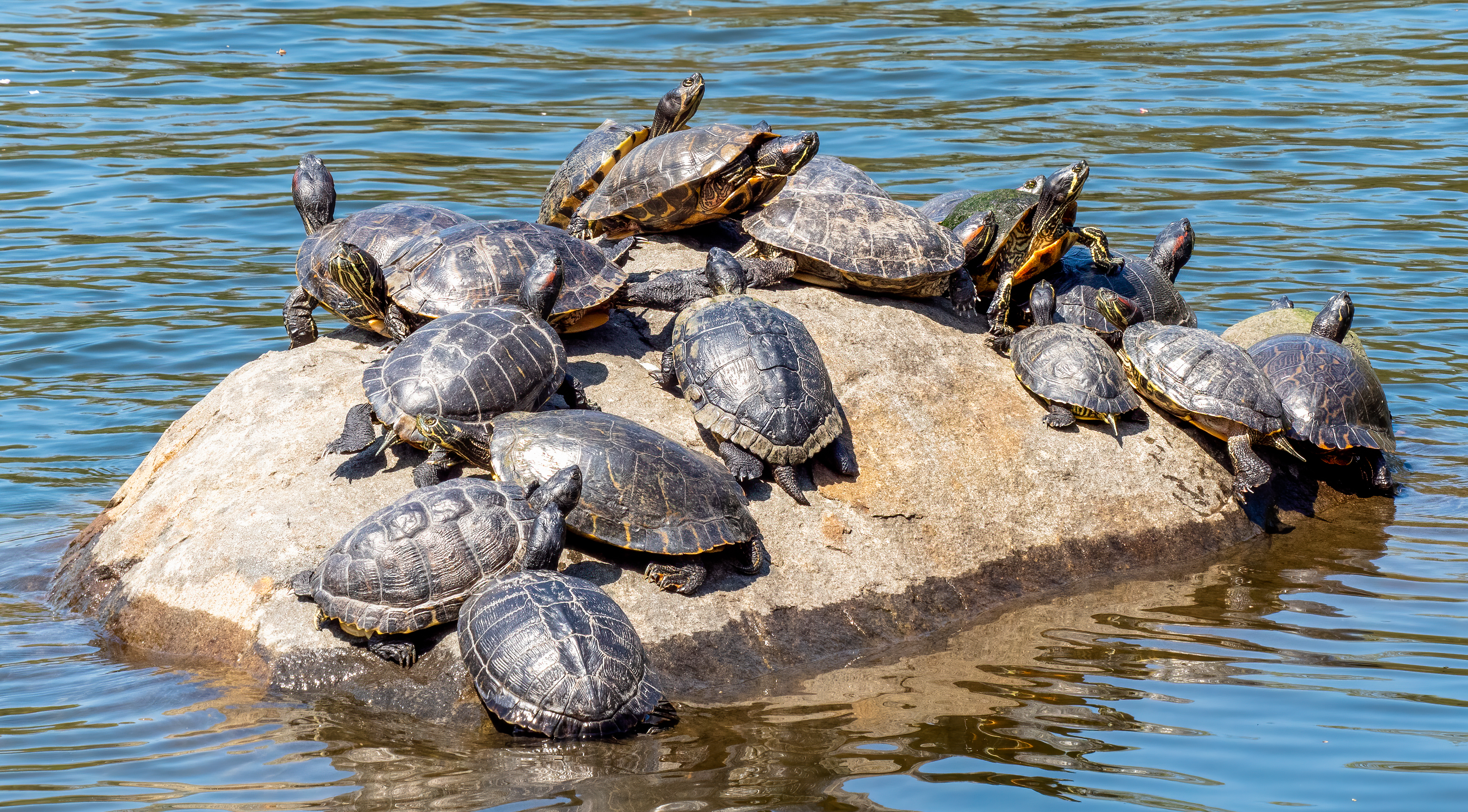
Pond sliders and a river cooter struggle for space on a rock to bask

== Mammals ==
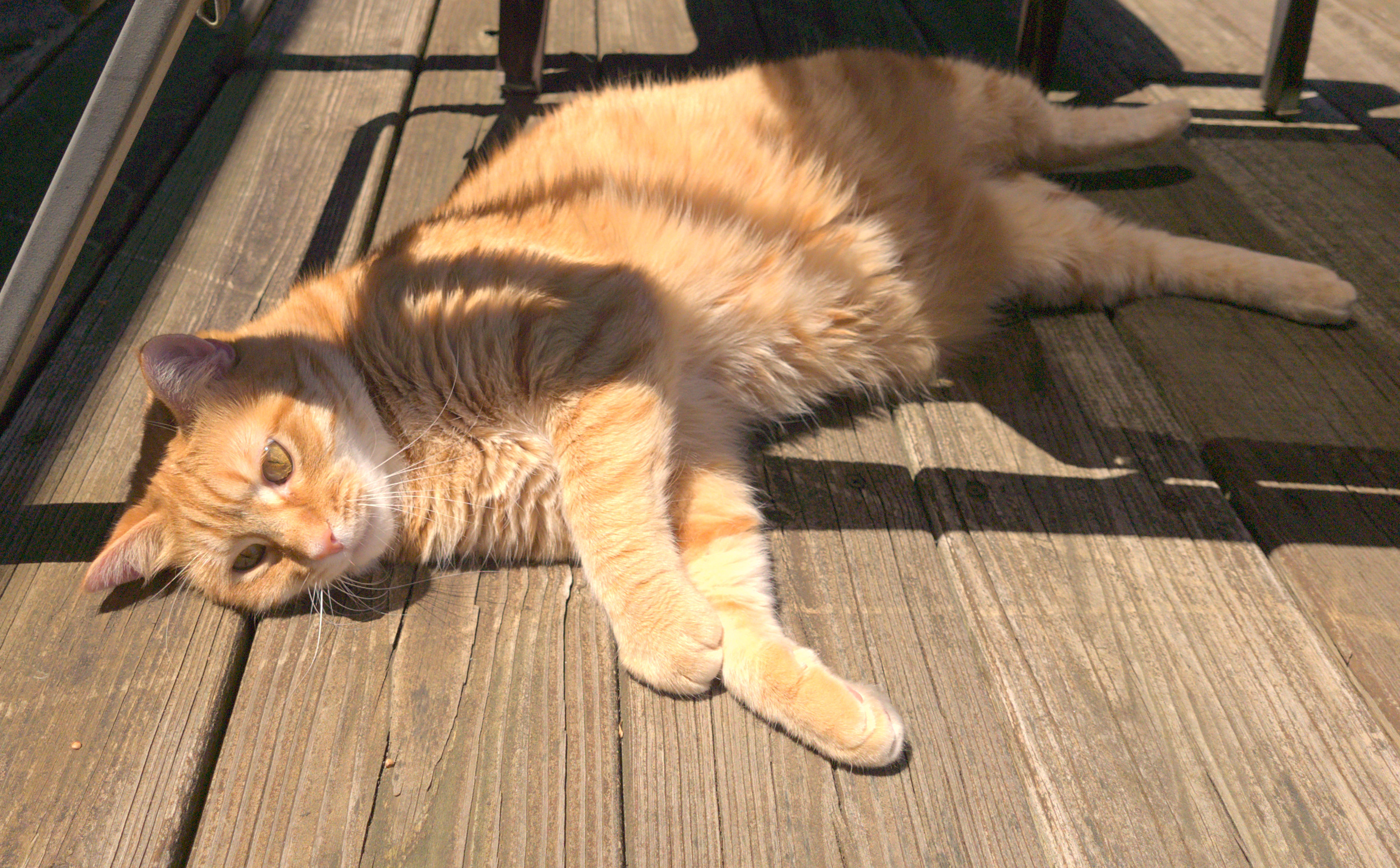
House cat basking

Some mammals and most humans make use of the sun to warm their body or to provide comfort. It has been suggested that early mammals, which may have been small and nocturnal, may have basked to rapidly warm their bodies based on observations made on a nocturnal marsupial, Pseudantechinus macdonnellensis.

== Insects ==
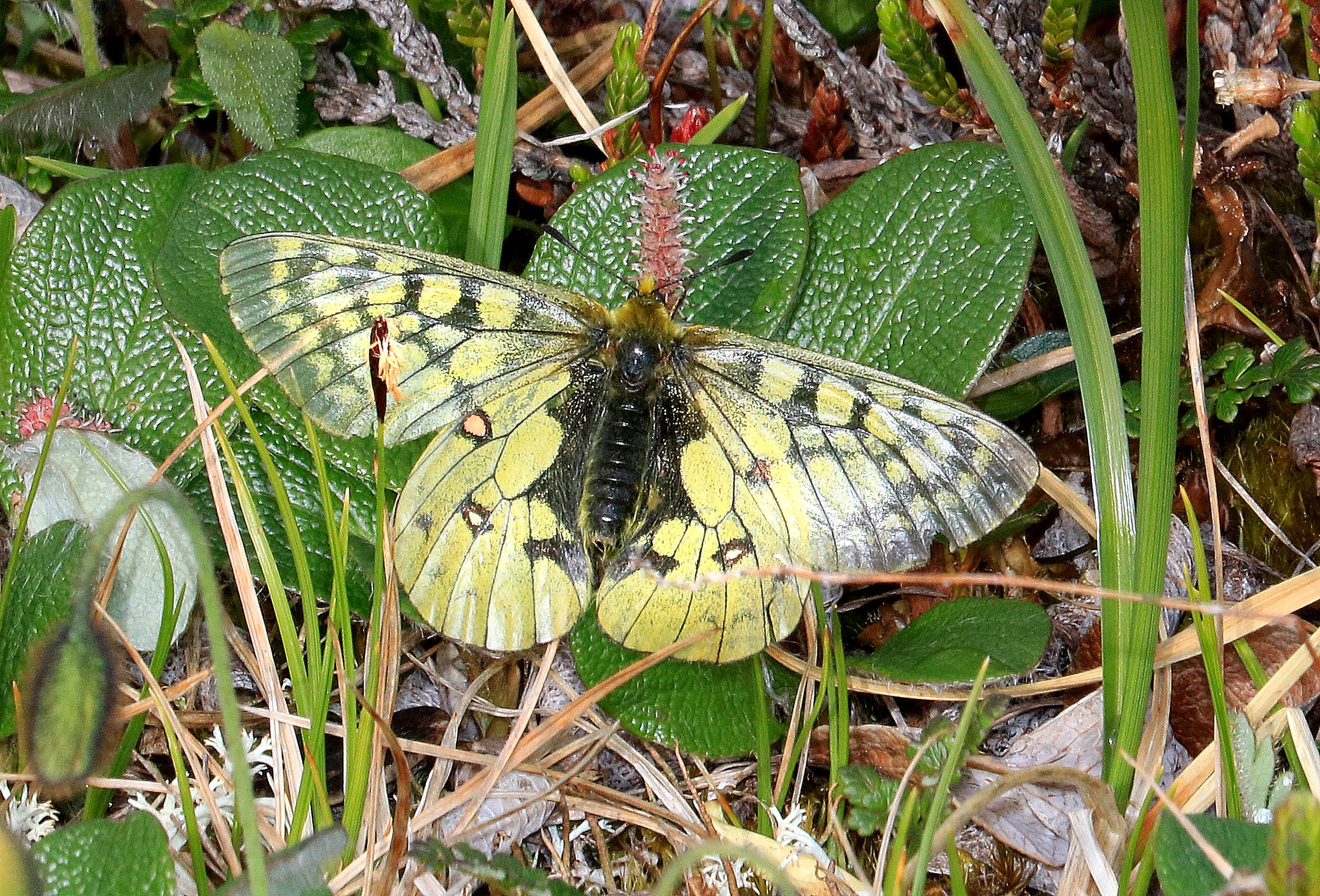
Parnassius eversmanni, a typical alpine butterfly with dark markings close to the body that help gather heat from the sun and forage early

Many insects require the morning sun to come out of nocturnal torpor and become active. In the higher latitudes, many insects have black on their wings or body to enhance their heat acquisition. This trend for increased darkness in higher latitudes is especially well marked in the Lepidoptera although the trend may be more general and unrelated to thermoregulation as it is also seen in nocturnal Geometridae.
