= Jackson ratio =

Researched and devised by Dr. Oliphant Jackson, the Jackson ratio is a method of determining whether a member of the tortoise species Testudo graeca or Testudo hermanni is maintaining its optimum bodyweight, which is necessary for a successful hibernation.

== Calculation ==
The Jackson ratio is calculated by taking the weight of the tortoise in grams and dividing it by the cube of the length of the tortoise's carapace in centimeters. This is essentially a value of the density of the tortoise in g/cm^{3}. The optimal value for this ratio is 0.21 with a range of 0.18–0.22 being acceptable for hibernation. Values significantly less than this indicate an underweight tortoise and larger values are indicative of overweight tortoises.

The Jackson ratio is expressed as a graph of minimum and optimum weights for a given carapace length. This exhibits the same principle without the maths.
