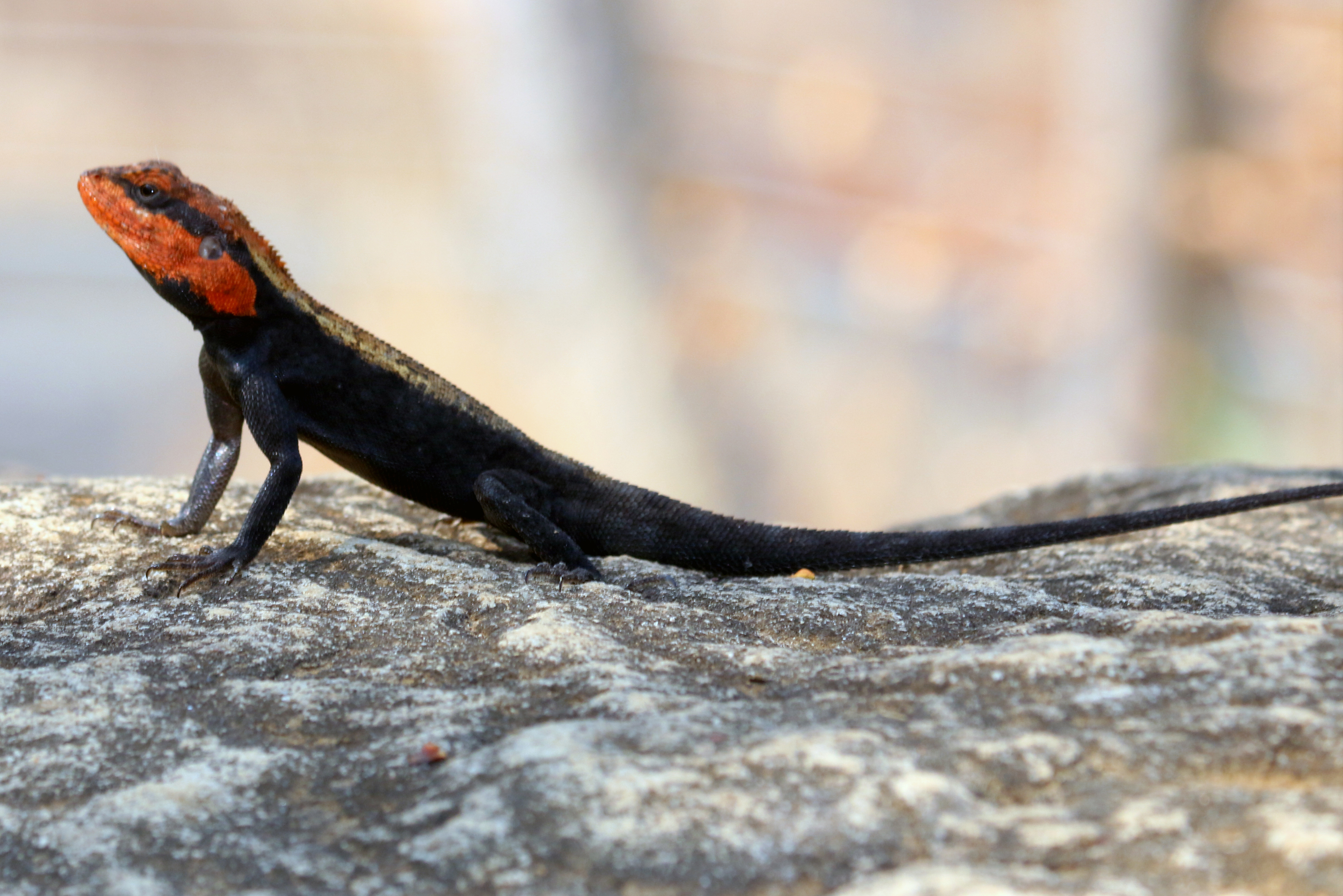
- Male
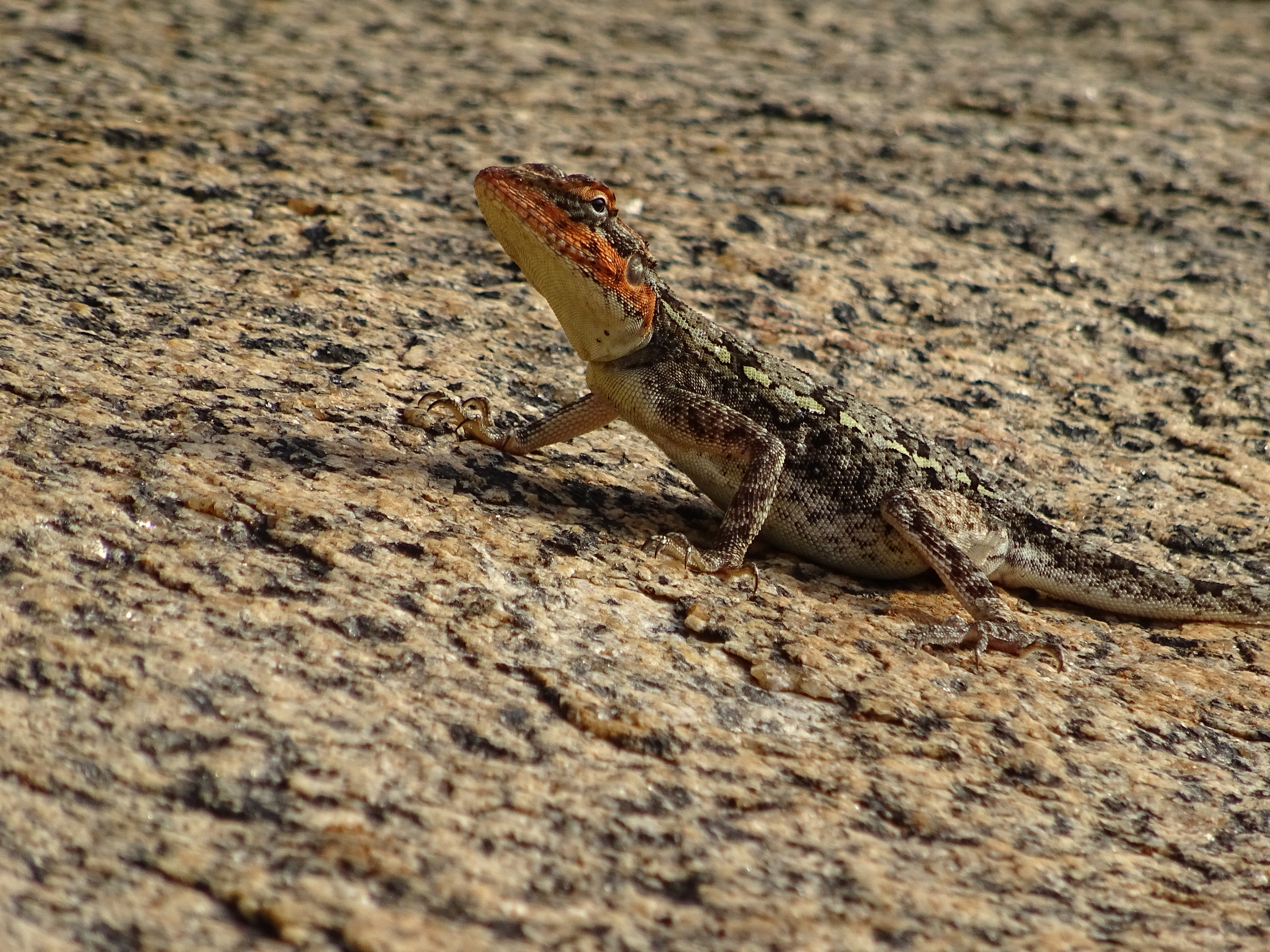
- Female

Conservation status
- Least Concern (IUCN 3.1)

Scientific classification
- Kingdom: Animalia
- Phylum: Chordata
- Class: Reptilia
- Order: Squamata
- Suborder: Iguania
- Family: Agamidae
- Genus: Psammophilus
- Species: P. dorsalis

Binomial name
- Psammophilus dorsalis (Gray, 1831)
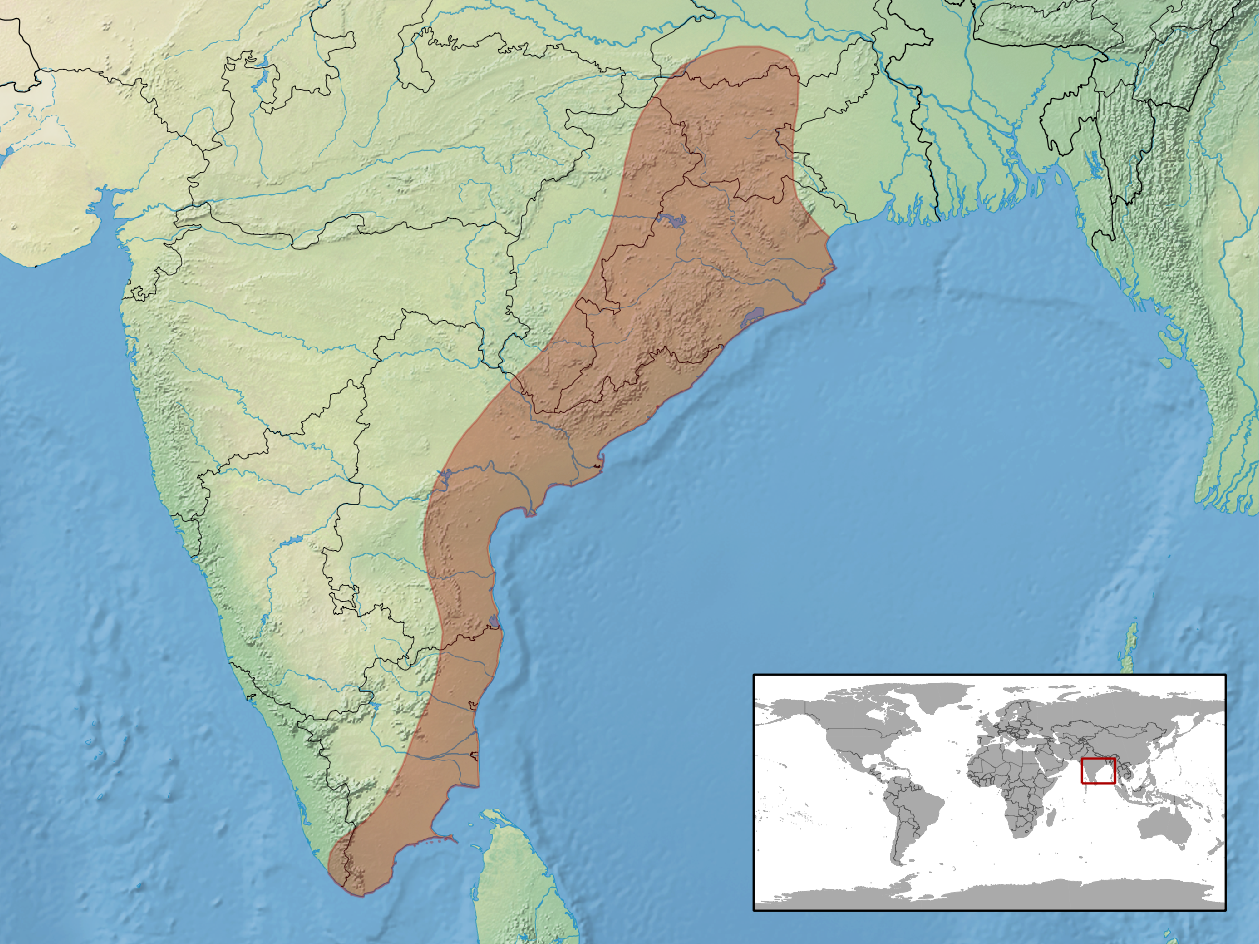

Synonyms
- Agama dorsalis Gray, 1831; Charasia dorsalis — Gray, 1845; Psammophilus dorsalis — M.A. Smith, 1935

= Peninsular rock agama =

Species of reptile

The peninsular rock agama or South Indian rock agama (Psammophilus dorsalis) is a common species of agama found on rocky hills in south India. An allied species, Psammophilus blanfordanus, is found in the Eastern Ghats, but north of the range of this species.

== Description ==
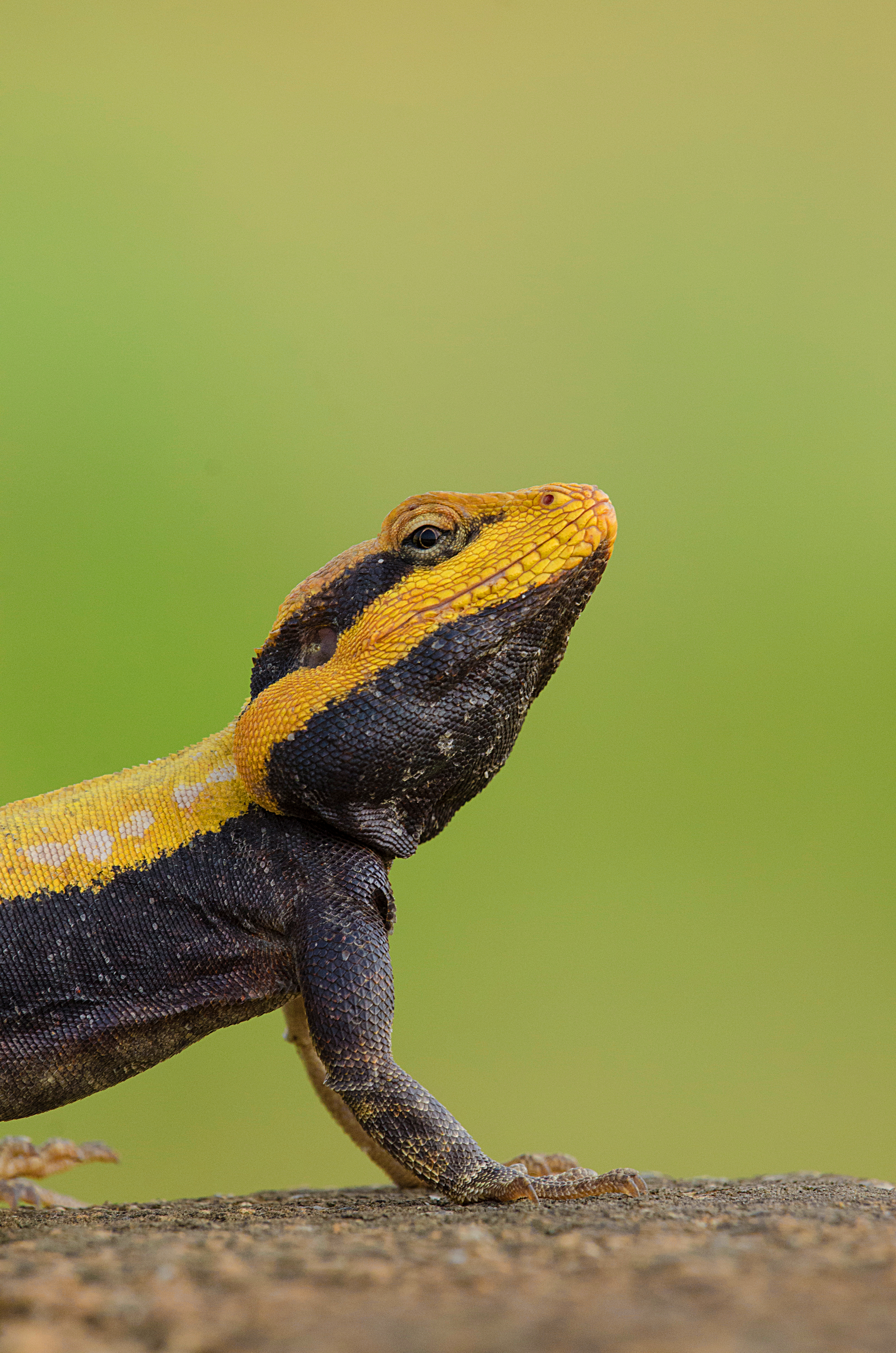
Close-up of a male

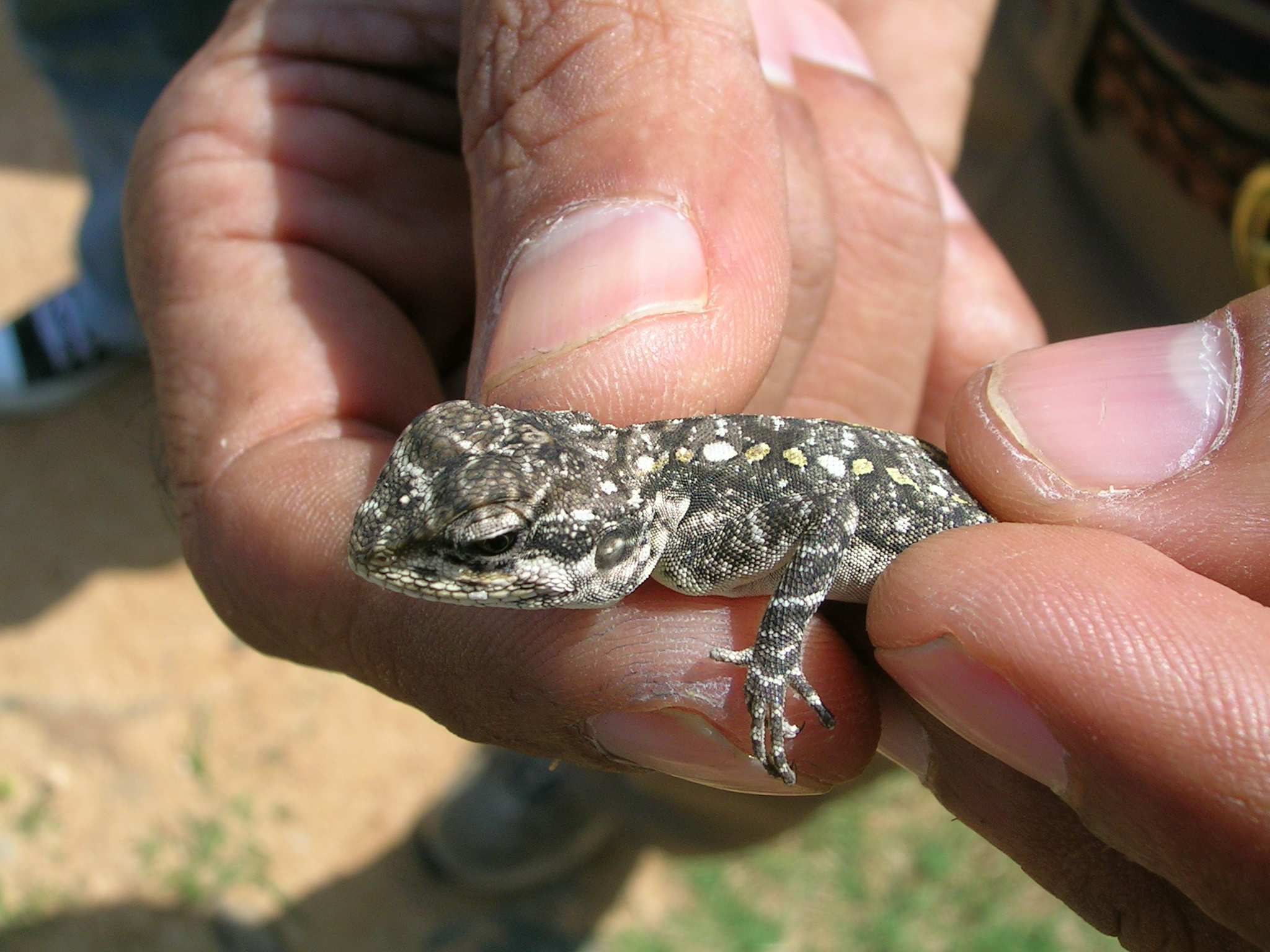
A female

This species of lizard has a large head that is elongated and depressed, with the cheeks swollen in adult males. The snout is longer than the diameter of the orbit (eye cavity). The upper head scales are unequal and smooth or obtusely keeled, the scales being larger on the sinciput (brow) than on the occiput. The canthus rostralis and supraciliary (brow) has a clear and sharp edge, two small separated spines or groups of spines above the ear are present or absent; the diameter of the tympanum is half or a little more than half that of the orbit; it has 10 to 13 upper and as many lower labial scales. The body is slightly flattened; dorsal scales are small, uniform, smooth, or feebly keeled in the adult, and strongly keeled in the young, all pointing backwards and upwards; the dorsal crest is reduced to a ridge of enlarged scales; ventral scales are as large as the dorsals, and smooth (keeled in the young); from 115 to 150 scales occur around the middle of the body; the gular (under chin) scales are a little smaller than the ventral (underside) scales; four or five enlarged scales occur on the chin parallel with the anterior labials, separated from them by two rows of scales; a strong transverse fold covered with small scales is seen across the throat; the nuchal and dorsal crests are merely tooth-like protrusions. The legs are strong, covered with uniform, keeled scales; the hind limb when extended forward in a specimen reaches the ear or the rear end of the eye, and further forward in younger individuals. The tail is slightly flattened and covered with keeled scales, which are larger below than above. In the adult male, it is distinctly swollen at the base, the scales on that part of it are thickened, and those of the upper median row are enlarged.

Young and females are olive-brown, spotted, speckled, or marbled with dark brown, and with a series of white, elongated spots along each side of the back. The male has pale brownish colour on the top of the head and back, while the lips are yellowish-brown, and this extends as a strip beyond the ear. A dark brown or black lateral stripe begins behind the eye and broadens to cover the lower sides. The underside is yellow with the throat mottled with grey.

These lizards basks on bare rocks where they are hidden by their cryptic colouration. They feed on insects. The male in the breeding season assumes bright colours. The upper parts become fine vermilion red or yellow, the lip stripe is sometimes pink. The under surfaces, limbs, and tail are black.

From snout to vent, its length is 135 mm, the tail is 200 mm. Females are smaller.

== Behaviour ==
Males bask openly on exposed rocks and show head push-up displays. The larger males take up higher perch positions. They flatten their bodies when birds fly overhead. Densities of about 90 lizards per hectare have been noted.

== Geographic range ==
They are found in southern India, south of about 16°N latitude. In the Western Ghats, Nilgiris, South Arcot, and Nallamalai Hills, they are found in the hilly regions at altitudes up to 6000 ft above sea level in the Nilgiris. It is very common in some parts of the Nilgiris and it was noted as being particularly common near Bangalore by M.A. Smith in The Fauna of British India.
