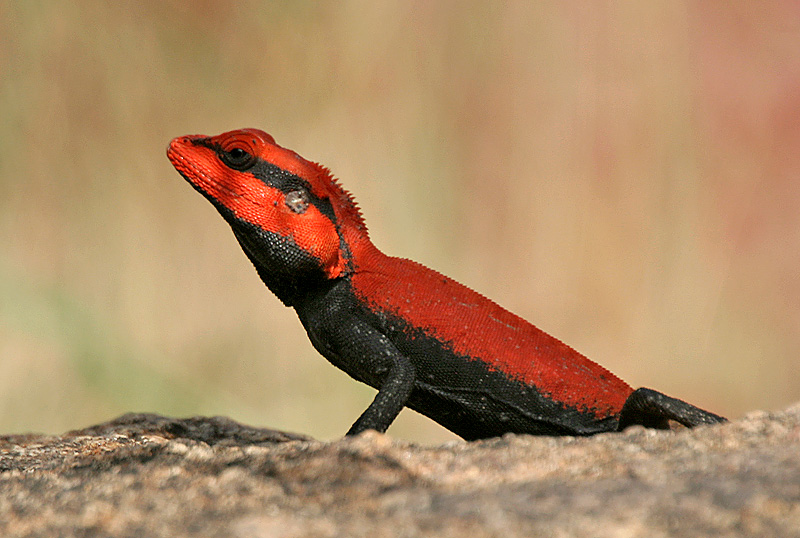
- Psammophilus dorsalis male.

Scientific classification
- Kingdom: Animalia
- Phylum: Chordata
- Class: Reptilia
- Order: Squamata
- Suborder: Iguania
- Family: Agamidae
- Subfamily: Draconinae
- Genus: Psammophilus; Fitzinger, 1843

Synonyms
- Charasia Gray, 1845

= Psammophilus =

Genus of lizards

Psammophilus is a genus of agamid lizards found in India. Although the genus name means "sand loving" in Greek, they are found in rocky habitats.

== Species ==
Male	Female	Scientific name	Common name	Distribution
		Psammophilus blanfordanus (Stoliczka, 1871)	Blanford's rock agama	India (Chota Nagpur, as high as Parasnath Hill ).
		Psammophilus dorsalis (Gray, 1831)	peninsular rock agama, South Indian rock agama	India (Western Ghats, Nilgiris, South Arcot, and Nallamalai Hills)
