= Andy C. Highfield =

British author and herpetologist

- Born: 1955 (age 70–71)
- Occupations: Author, herpetologist
- Known for: Writing on tortoise husbandry and conservation
- Spouse: Nadine Highfield

Andy C. Highfield (born 1955) is a British author and herpetologist who has published extensively on the husbandry, nutrition, and conservation of tortoises.

== Biography ==
Highfield has regularly published books and articles on tortoise husbandry in herpetological magazines in Europe and the United States since the late 1980s, and is known as an author of practical guides. He was a co-founder and course instructor, author, and lecturer with the Tortoise Trust, an organisation concerned with tortoise research and conservation.

His research focused on tortoises of the Mediterranean Basin. He conducted extensive field research there in an effort to investigate and revise the taxonomy of the entire genus Testudo.

In 1990, during his research in Tunisia, he defined the Tunisian tortoise as Testudo graeca nabeulensis, a subspecies of the Greek tortoise (Testudo graeca). This challenged the view that the Tunisian tortoise represented a separate tortoise species.

His wife is Nadine Highfield, who supports his work as a photographer.
