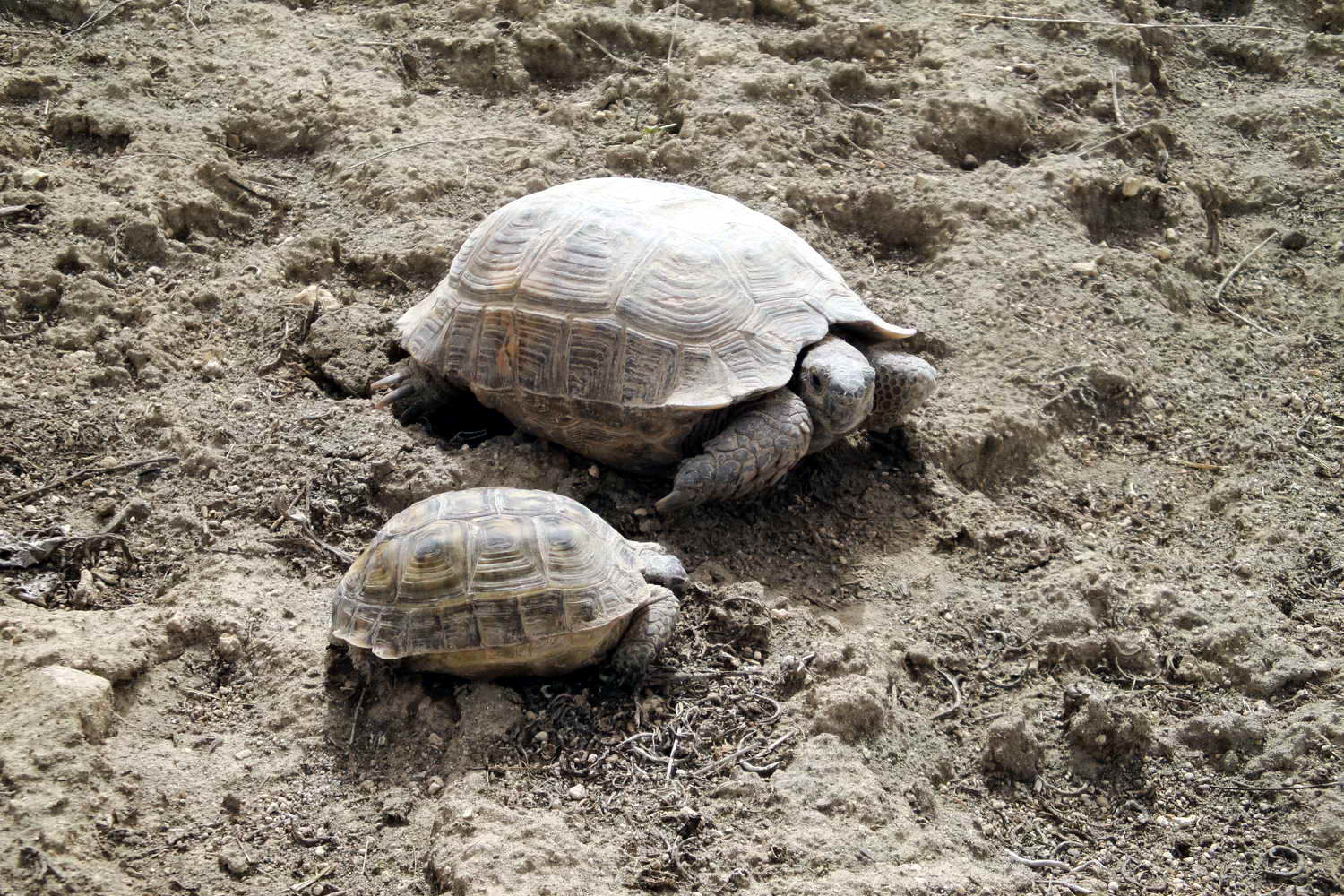
- Two Armenian tortoises

Conservation status
- Critically Endangered (IUCN 2.3)

Scientific classification
- Domain: Eukaryota
- Kingdom: Animalia
- Phylum: Chordata
- Class: Reptilia
- Order: Testudines
- Suborder: Cryptodira
- Superfamily: Testudinoidea
- Family: Testudinidae
- Genus: Testudo
- Species: T. graeca
- Subspecies: T. g. armeniaca

Trinomial name
- Testudo graeca armeniaca Chkhikvadze and Bakradse, 1991

= Armenian tortoise =

Subspecies of tortoise

The Armenian tortoise (Testudo graeca armeniaca) or Araxes tortoise is a subspecies of the Greek tortoise.

== Distribution ==
It can be found in Armenia, mainly in semi-desert habitats of Araks Valley, as well as in Tavush Province.

== Biota and climate ==
It can be found in various habitats, including the dry steppes and grassy slopes of hills or mountains with bushes, forests, meadows, and fields. It avoids the saline soils and areas with thick vegetation.

== Description ==
This turtle has a flattened carapace, dark brown and yellow-cream in color, with a height equal to half the length of the carapace. The "annual rings" are clearly recognizable. The "toes" on front legs are flat and adapted for digging. Its size varies from 20 to 23 cm.

== Conservation ==
A concentration of 0.5 – 2.0 tortoises per hectare were registered in the Ijevan region. The approximate population in Armenia is a few thousand. Testudo graeca armeniaca is threatened with the complete disappearance in the medium term; the harvest and the conquest of human habitats are real threats to its future. Nevertheless, it enjoys a protected area in the Khosrov State Reserve in Armenia. Specimens are kept in a number zoos of the world, in the Institute of Zoology of Armenia, and in the Center for Conservation of Biodiversity of the Institute of Botany of Armenia. Often, they are kept by terrarium keepers.
