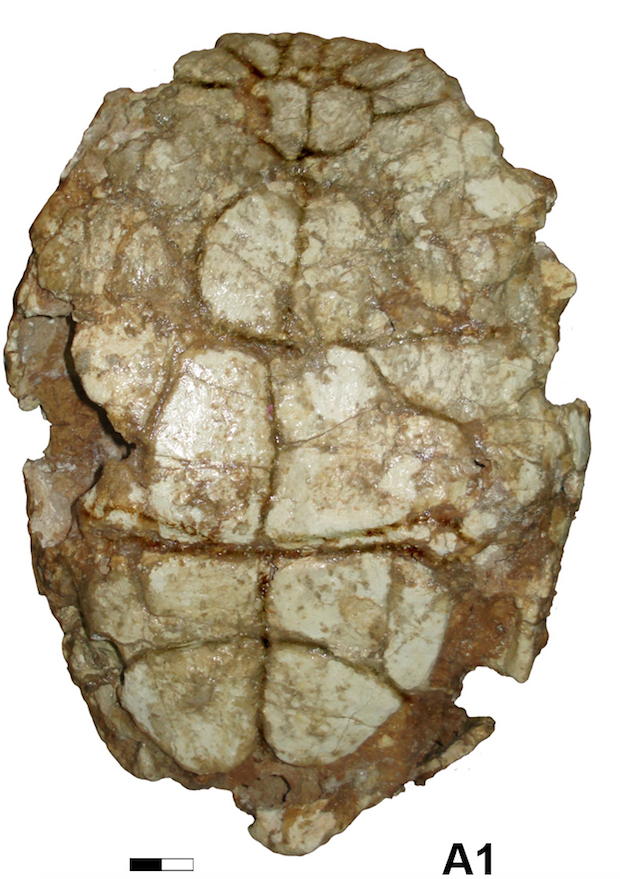
- Holotype carapace LGPUT RPI-216

Scientific classification
- Kingdom: Animalia
- Phylum: Chordata
- Class: Reptilia
- Order: Testudines
- Suborder: Cryptodira
- Family: Testudinidae
- Genus: Testudo
- Species: T. hellenica

Binomial name
- Testudo hellenica Garcia et al., 2020

= Testudo hellenica =

Testudo hellenica Temporal range: Late Miocene, 9.149–9.046 Ma

Extinct species of tortoise

Testudo hellenica is an extinct genus of tortoise of the genus Testudo from the Miocene (Vallesian) Nea Messimvria Formation (Zone MN 10) of Greece. T. hellenica is the earliest known crown-Testudo from Greece (according to Garcia et al., 2020), since the next oldest Testudo species, T. marmorum, from Greece come from the Turolian (7.3-7.2 ma) Pikermi beds.

T. hellenica is important for understanding the radiation of the evolutionary history of the lineage of the Testudo genus, pushing it back from 7 Ma (2017) and 8 Ma (2018) to 9.1-9 Ma (2020).

== Discovery and naming ==
The holotype, a carapace with a preserved plastron, was discovered c. 1983 in the Ravin de la Pluie, Axios Valley from fossil sediments ranging from 9.149-9.046 Ma, although the formation may be as old as 11.608 Ma and as recent as 8.7 Ma. In order to observe the detail of the carapace, the specimen was completely prepared. The phylogeny of T. hellenica was studied in 2016, although it was unnamed at the time. The species Testudo hellenica was named in 2020.

The holotype, LGPUT RPI-216, preserves a carapace, plastron and several bones underneath, including a fused humerus and scapula.

== Description ==
The carapace is approximately 22.8 centimetres (9.0 in) long, meaning that when fully grown, it would have been around 1 metre (3.3 ft) long. The rounded anterior lobe is 55.8 millimetres (2.20 in) long, while the posterior lobe is 66.1 millimetres (2.60 in) long. The bridge between the two lobes is 102.7 millimetres (4.04 in) long. Since the domed pygal plate curves inwards, this indicates that the holotype individual was a male. Testudo hellenica shares with Eurotestudo, T. marginata and T. marmorum an elongated shell, although the plastron of the holotype of T. marmorum is different to that of T. hellenica.
