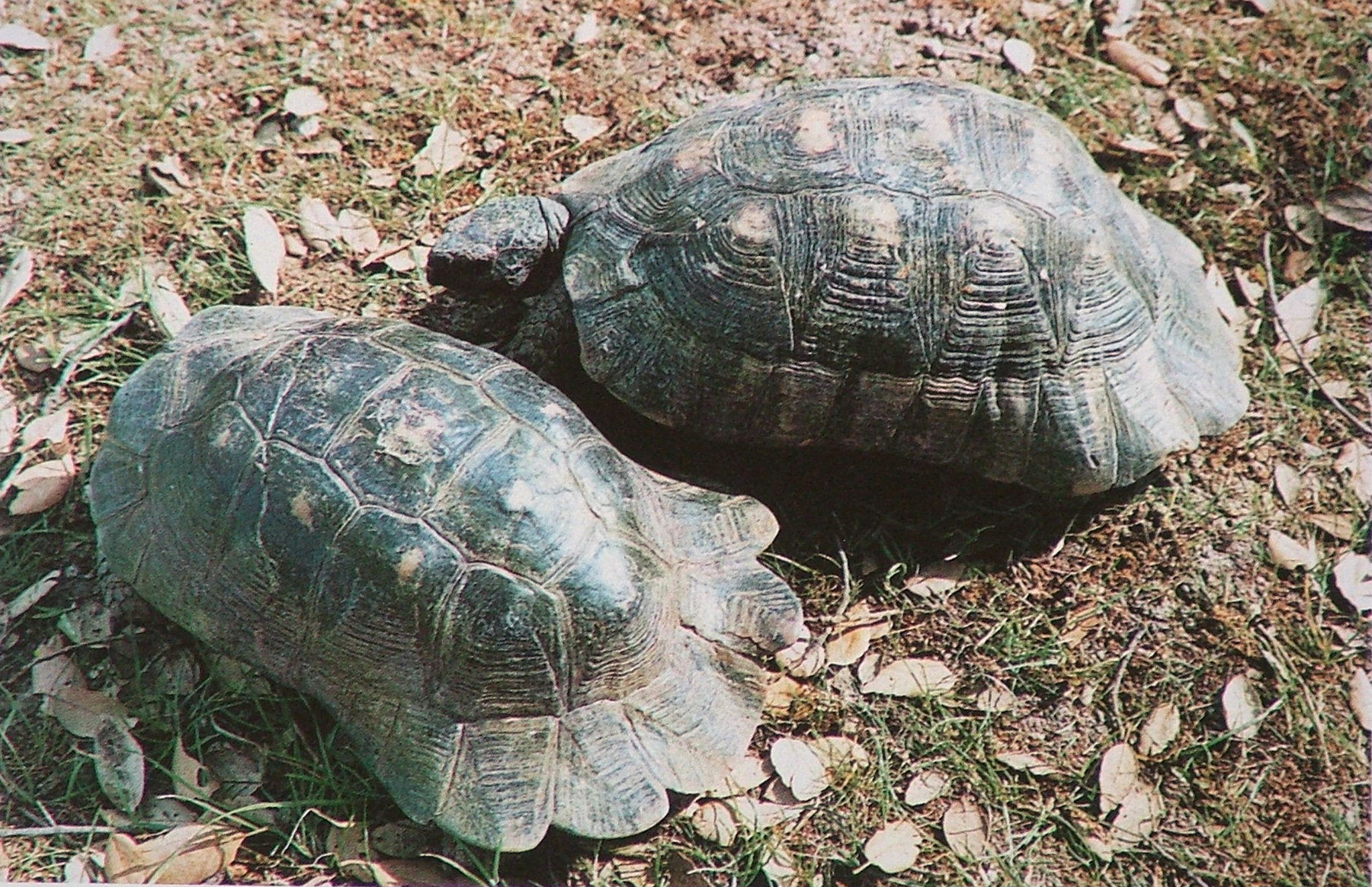
- Left: Greek marginated tortoise (T. m. marginata); Right: Sardinian marginated tortoise (T. m. sarda)

Conservation status
- Least Concern (IUCN 3.1)

Scientific classification
- Kingdom: Animalia
- Phylum: Chordata
- Class: Reptilia
- Order: Testudines
- Suborder: Cryptodira
- Family: Testudinidae
- Genus: Testudo
- Species: T. marginata

Binomial name
- Testudo marginata Schoepff, 1789

Subspecies
- Greek marginated tortoise (T. m. marginata) — Schoepff, 1789; Sardinian marginated tortoise (T. m. sarda) — Mayer, 1992

Synonyms
- List: Testudo marginata Schoepff, 1793; Testudo graja Hermann, 1793; Chersine marginata — Merrem, 1820; Chersus marginatus — Wagler, 1830; Testudo campanulata Gray, 1831 (nomen nudum); Testudo graji Gray, 1831 (ex errore); Testudo campanulata Strauch, 1862; Peltastes marginatus — Gray, 1869; Peltastes marginata — Gray, 1872; Testudo nemoralis Schreiber, 1875; Testudo marginata sarda Mayer, 1992; Testudo marginata weissingeri Trutnau, 1994; Testudo weissingeri Bour, 1996; Testudo marginata marginata — Rogner, 1996

= Marginated tortoise =

Species of tortoise

The marginated tortoise (Testudo marginata) is a species of tortoise in the family Testudinidae. The species is endemic to Greece, Italy, and the Balkans in Southern Europe. It is the largest European tortoise. The marginated tortoise is herbivorous, and brumates for the winter.

== Taxonomy ==
Carapace shapes of Greek (left) and Sardinian marginated tortoises

The marginated tortoise was formally described by German naturalist Johann David Schoepff in 1789; its specific epithet marginata is a straightforward derivation from the Latin term for 'marginated'.

The nominate subspecies is the Greek marginated tortoise, Testudo marginata marginata. Three additional subspecies of marginated tortoises have been named:

The Sardinian marginated tortoise (T. m. sarda) is the name usually used, but not scientifically accepted, to separate the population on the island of Sardinia. The population of Sardinia is, in fact, of recent origin as demonstrated by DNA analysis. Anecdotally, these tortoises have supposed to be distinguished by a few morphological characters (such as strongly bent tiles in the posterior of their carapaces and the shape of the posterior of the carapace), but scientific data recordings are lacking. Although entirely allopatric, it cannot be distinguished by mtDNA cytochrome b and nDNA ISSR sequence analysis. Lineage sorting has not occurred to a considerable degree; consequently, the more geographically isolated Sardinian population is presumably of quite recent origin and due to deliberate human introduction. Though it is not clear whether this occurred in prehistoric times or more recently, this might be resolved by dating subfossil remains. Sequence evolution at least in mtDNA is known to proceed much more slowly in some turtles and tortoises than in others; the rate of the mitochondrial 12S rRNA gene in Testudo is probably a rather low 1.0–1.6% per million years (as this fits best the paleobiogeographical situation), limiting the resolution provided by molecular systematics.

An extinct subspecies described as T. m. cretensis persisted on Crete before the end of the last ice age, presumably larger than mainland tortoises. However, numerous additional fossils have since refuted the validity of this subspecies.

A population of small and light-colored marginated tortoises exists on the southwestern coast of the Peloponnesus, between Kalamata and south of Stoupa. The so-called "dwarf marginated tortoise" was described as a new species Testudo weissingeri, but it is not recognizably distinct phylogenetically. Unlike the Sardinian population, it occupies an extremely restricted range with very arid habitat, and its apomorphies seem related to this. Considering ice age-associated climate and sea level changes, this population is probably not older than a few thousand years; as it is not geographically isolated, it should be considered a local form, and not even a subspecies T. m. weissingeri. Notably, a similar situation is found in Hermann's tortoises living in the same region.

Testudo marginata is also closely related to the Greek or common tortoise (Testudo graeca). Both have very similar bodily characteristics—oblong carapaces, large scales on the front legs, large coverings for the head and cone-like scales on the upper thighs, undivided tail coverings, moveable stomach plates, and lack of tail spikes. Presumably, Testudo marginata diverged from ancestral Testudo graeca as a population more suited for life in the mountainous regions. Evidence in favor of this is the wide geographical region and the extremely large number of subspecies of Testudo graeca, including a subspecies in Turkey with strongly bent carapace tiles, like the marginated tortoise. Testudo marginata on the other hand, despite the two subspecies, presents a much more unified appearance, which points toward an earlier appearance in evolutionary history. In captivity, the two species often cross-breed, but this should be avoided.

According to the 2005 DNA sequence data, these species do not seem to hybridize to a notable extent in the wild, though they are obviously very close relatives, and as evidenced by morphology, some allele flow still occurs, but slowly. The Egyptian tortoise appears to represent a lineage that diverged from the same ancestral stock southwards into northeastern Africa around the same time as the marginated tortoise's ancestors diverged in Greece. These two are actually more similar to each other than to T. graeca regarding DNA sequence data, but considering biogeography, this is either due to (rather unlikely) dispersal across the Mediterranean, or the supposed "clade" is invalid and the similarity due to convergent evolution.

== Description ==
The marginated tortoise is the largest European tortoise, reaching a weight of up to 5 kg (11 lb) and a length of 35 cm (14 in). Its shell is oblong and has a notable thickness around the middle of the body. The posterior end of the shell has a saw-like formation, flanged outward like a bell. The carapace of an adult specimen is almost completely black, with yellow highlights. The ventral shell is lighter-coloured and has pairs of triangular markings with the points facing the rear of the animal. The front sides of the limbs are covered with large scales. In an old female specimen, the rear flaps of the underside of her plastron is somewhat moveable. The tail is notable for a lengthwise marking and for an undivided carapace over the tail. The male has a longer tail, which is thicker at the base than the female's. The underside is more strongly indented. Males are also often larger than the females. The females lay their hard-shelled spherical eggs in the soil in May and June.

== Distribution and habitat ==
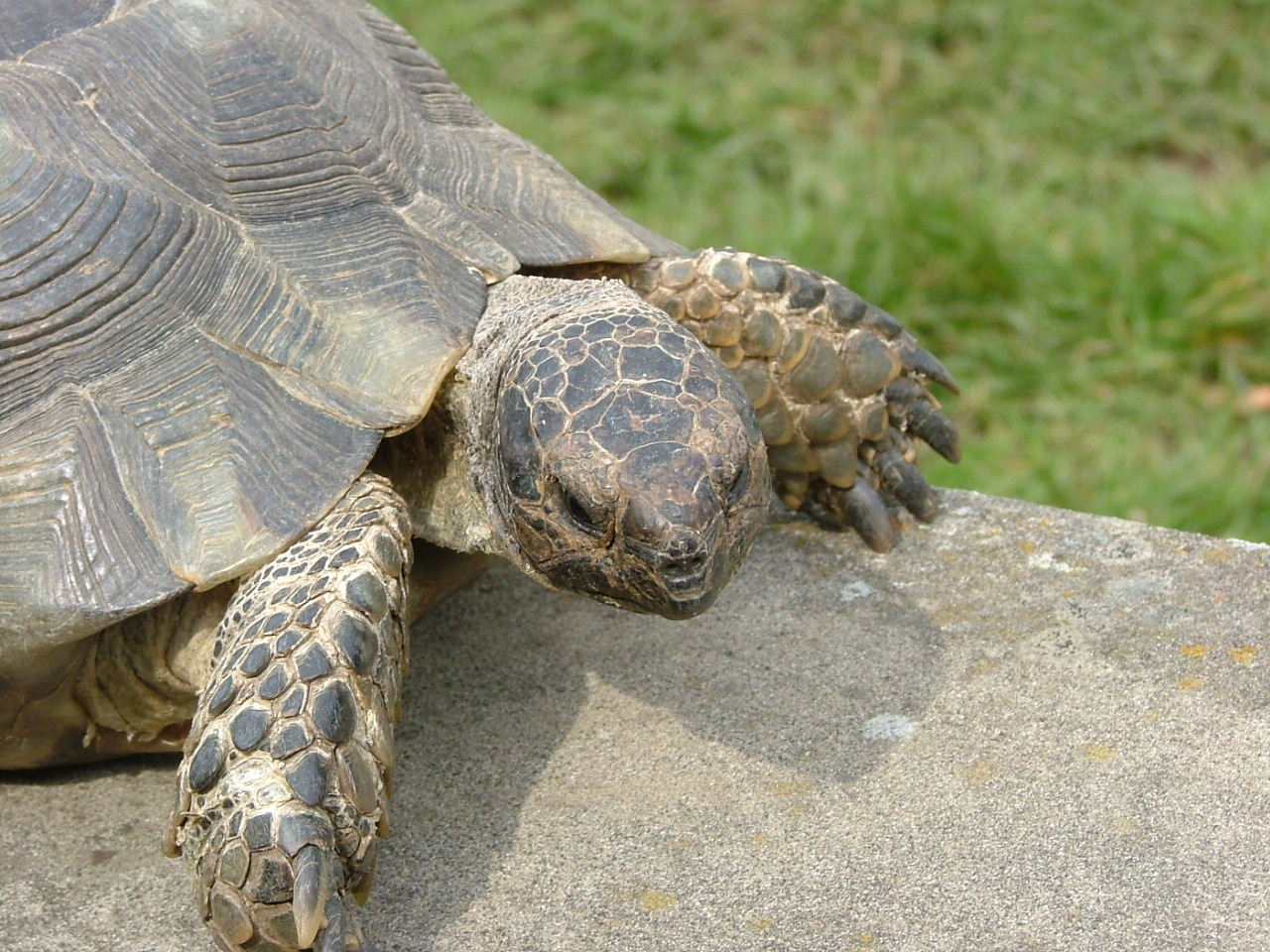
Close-up of fore limbs and head, showing the particularly large scales

The natural range of the marginated tortoise is southern Greece, from the Peloponnesus to Mount Olympus. They are also found in isolated zones of the Balkans and Italy, and northeastern Sardinia.

The marginated tortoise lives in more mountainous regions than Hermann's tortoise. It can be found in elevations as high as 1,600 m (5,200 ft). The black color of the carapace is helpful for survival in this environment, as it allows the tortoise to absorb a great deal of heat in a short time, helping it maintain its body temperature. Early in the morning, marginated tortoises bask in the sun to raise their body temperature, and then search for food. After feeding, the tortoises return to their shelters in the hot midday hours, leaving them again in the late afternoon.

== Behaviour ==
Marginated tortoises are fairly calm and relaxed, although they can be somewhat territorial in the wild. They have a controlled temper and are generally slow to anger. If they are not given the proper diet in captivity, however, they will become rather aggressive and might mistakenly attack if they feel threatened.

=== Diet ===
Marginated tortoises are herbivorous, their diets consisting primarily of plants from their native Mediterranean region.

=== Reproduction ===
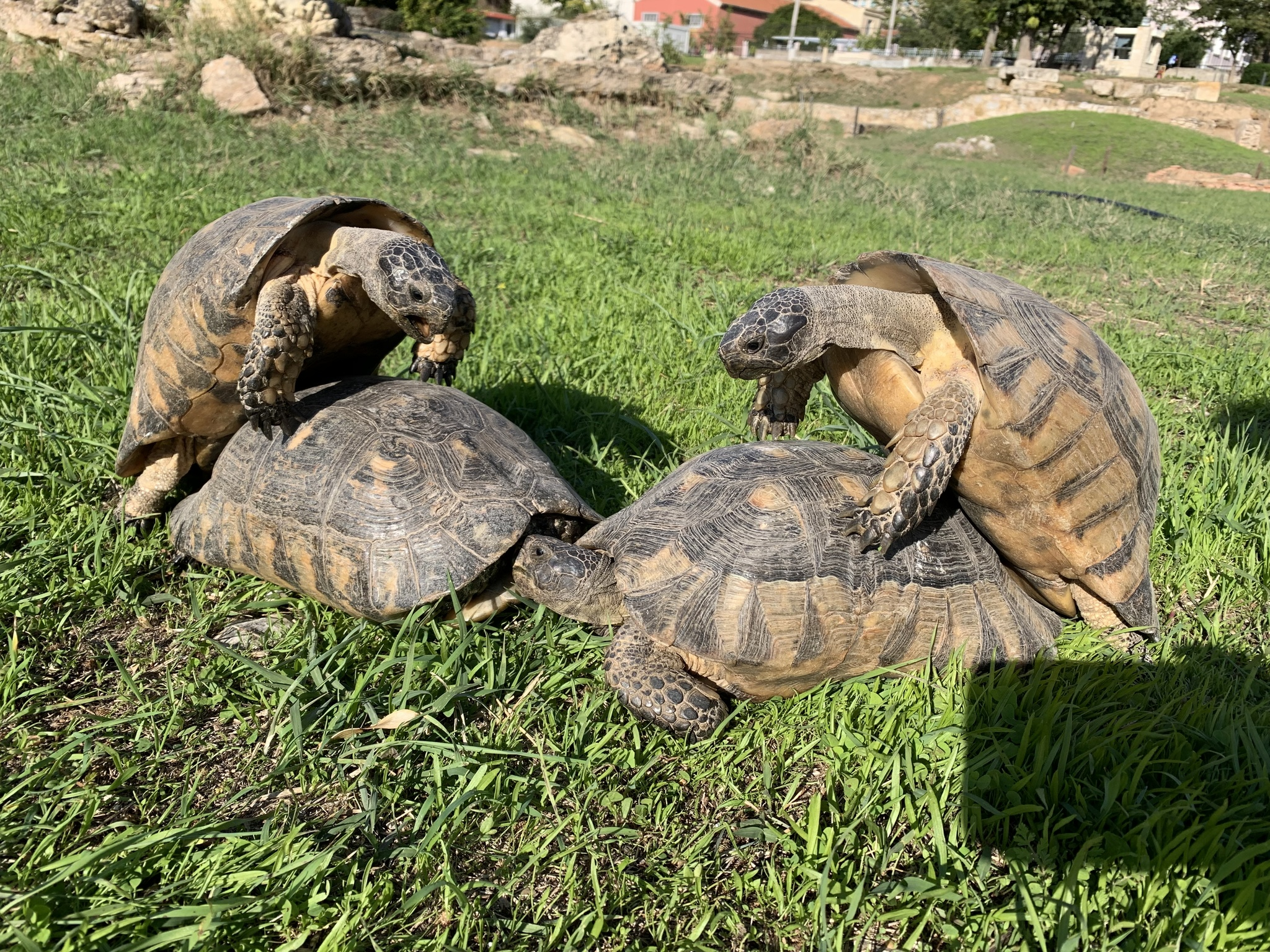
Mating, in Greece

Immediately after waking from brumation, the mating instinct starts up. The males follow the females with great interest, encircling them, biting them on the limbs, ramming them, and trying to mount them. During copulation, the male opens his mouth, showing his red tongue and making loud cries. The tone of the copulation cry is almost sobbing with long, deep tones, in contrast to T. hermanni, which uses a much higher-toned, peeping noise.

During mating, the female stands still and holds her head to the side, looking up to see the opened mouth of the male. The red tongue apparently serves a signalling function. The female moves her head from left to right in the same rhythm as the male's cries.

Afterwards, the female seeks out an adequate location to lay her eggs. Once such a place is found, the female stands still, propping both front legs firmly against the ground. Then she digs out a hole with her hind legs, alternating between left and right, beginning with simply scratching the ground but eventually moving large quantities of soil which are piled up beside the hole. The depth of the hole is determined by the length of her hind legs. If the ground is too hard to dig, the female releases water from her anal gland to soften it.

Once the hole is dug, egg-laying begins. Each egg is gently rolled back into the hole. After the last egg, the female immediately begins refilling the hole, again using her hind legs. Finally, she stamps the opening closed with her feet so that the ground regains its natural hardness. Larger animals may lay eggs as many as three times per summer, with about 15 eggs per clutch.

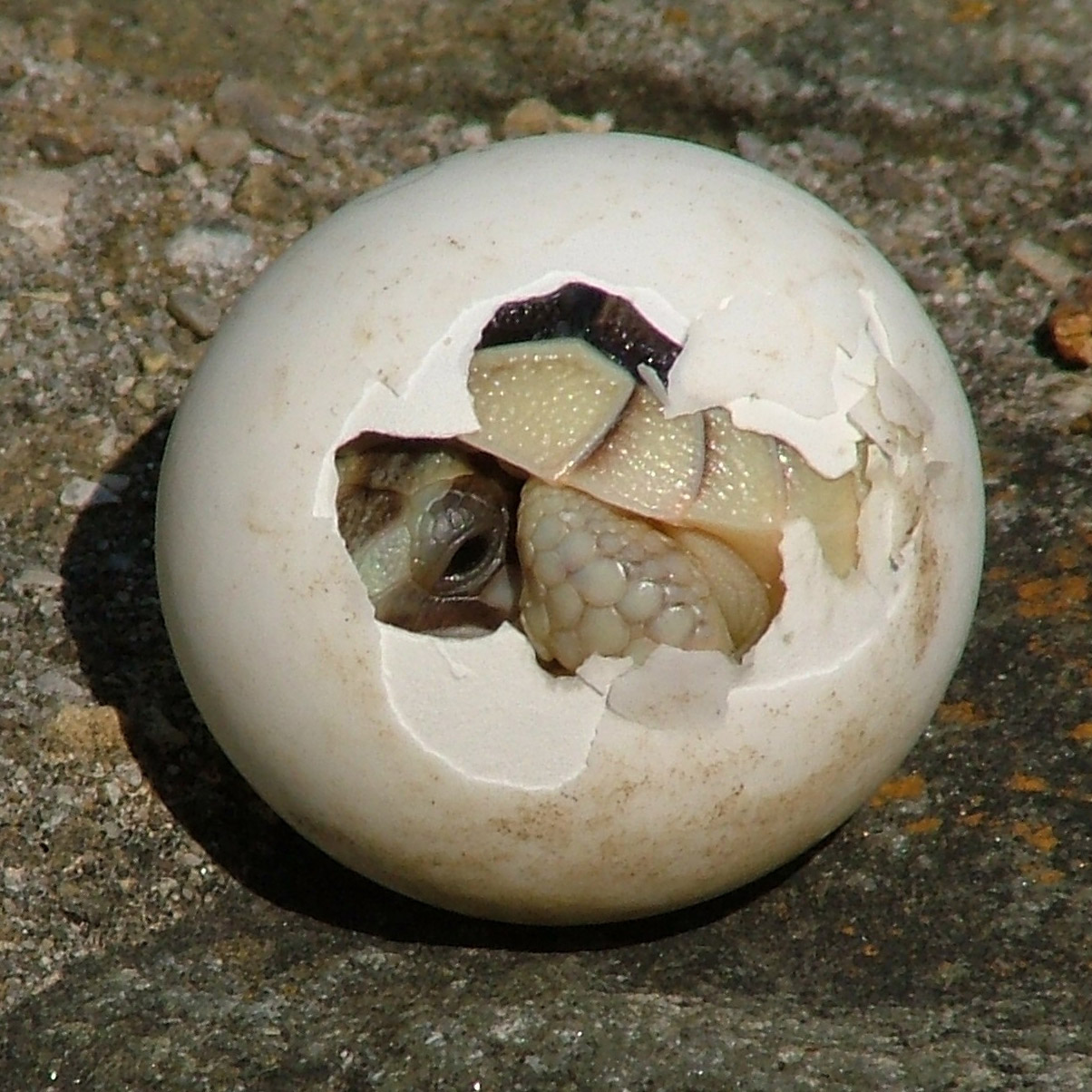
A marginated tortoise emerges into the world.

The incubation period averages about 100 days under natural conditions, which is relatively short among tortoises. Many tropical tortoises have incubation periods of up to 200 days. The relatively short time is an adaptation to the subtropical Mediterranean climate, where the summers are not as long. In an incubator, this time is notably shorter: with an incubation temperature of 31.5 °C (88.7 °F) the eggs will begin hatching after 60 days.

Unlike bird eggs, the yolk and albumen of reptile eggs are not separated by a membrane. After a few days, the heavy yolk components sink to the bottom of the egg. On top of this floats the embryonal disk, surrounded by albumen, so the tortoise eggs cannot be turned after the yolk settles without damaging or killing the embryo.

It is possible to see with the naked eye if the eggs are developing healthily. Freshly laid eggs have a gray-white color. Shortly thereafter, a bright white spot forms on the uppermost point of the egg. This spot gradually grows until the entire egg is bright white.

After the embryo has developed fully in the egg, the young animal breaks the shell with its egg tooth from inside, creates a small opening, and for the first time fills its lungs with air. Afterwards, it pulls back into the egg and works on the shell with its beak until it opens completely. In nature, the animal remains below ground for the first two weeks, where it is safe from predators, yet is still able to grow, as it is nourished by the yolk sac. The young animals lead cautious and secretive lives, normally remaining in the shade. They avoid full sunlight because of the great danger of overheating.

Marginated tortoises grow very rapidly. In an ideal biotope, or with good handling, they gain 100–500 g (3.5–17.6 oz) yearly. This quick rate of growth lasts throughout their youth. After the 20th year of life, further growth is minimal. They may live between 100 and 140 years, according to the best estimates of scientists.

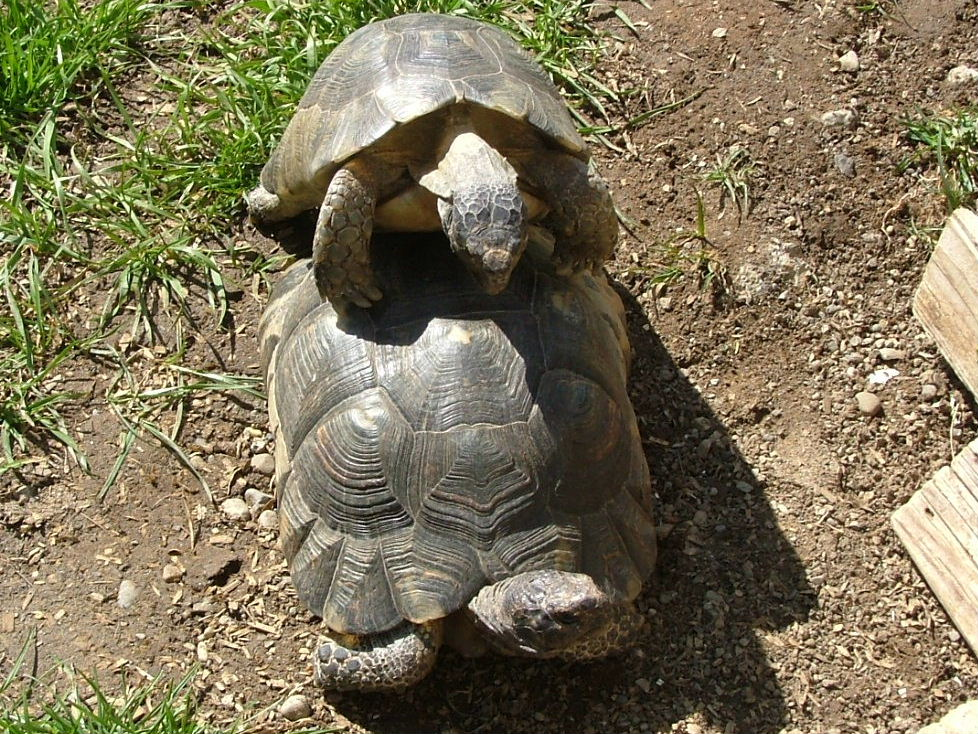
Two marginated tortoises mating

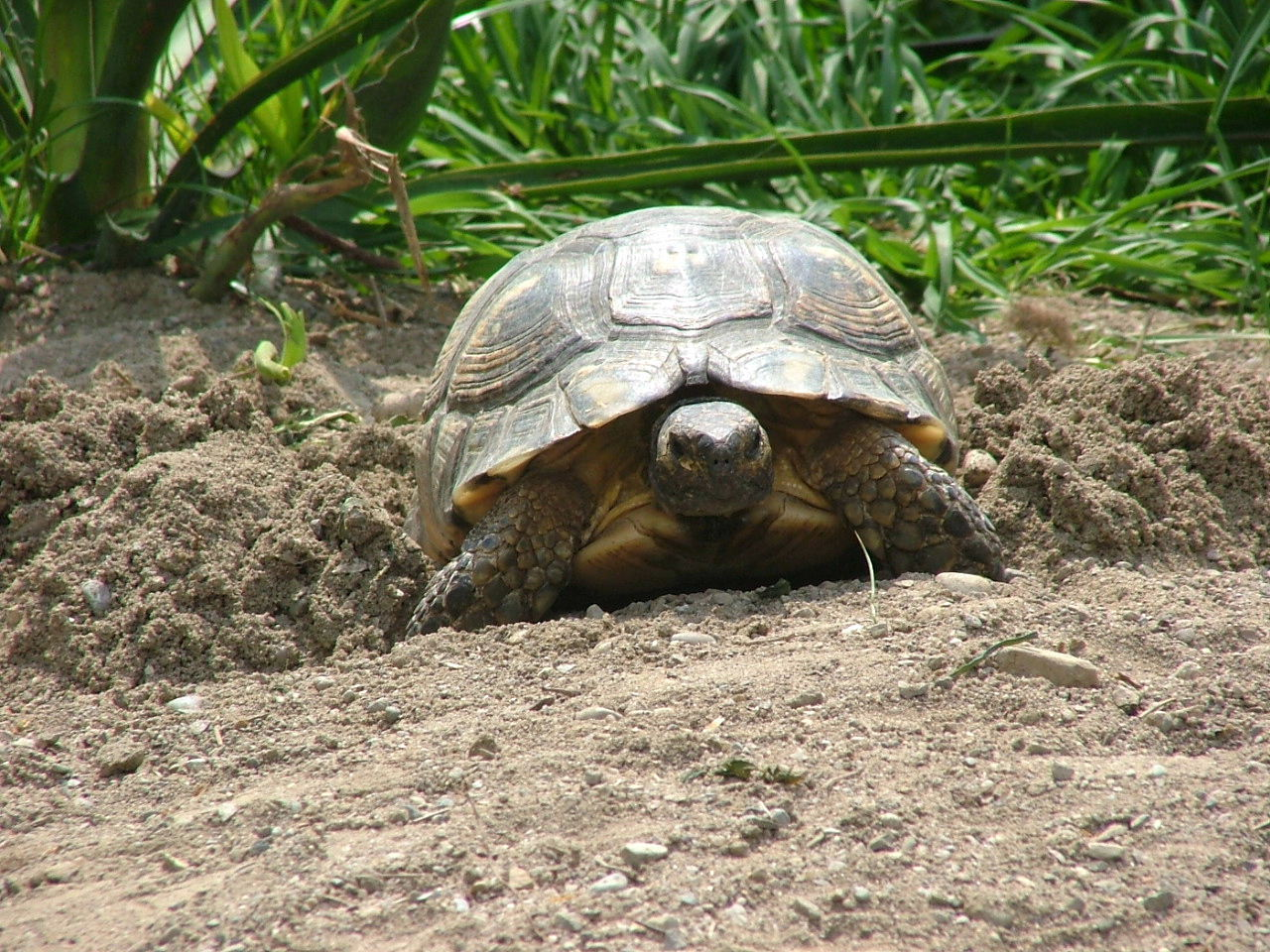
Building a nest burrow

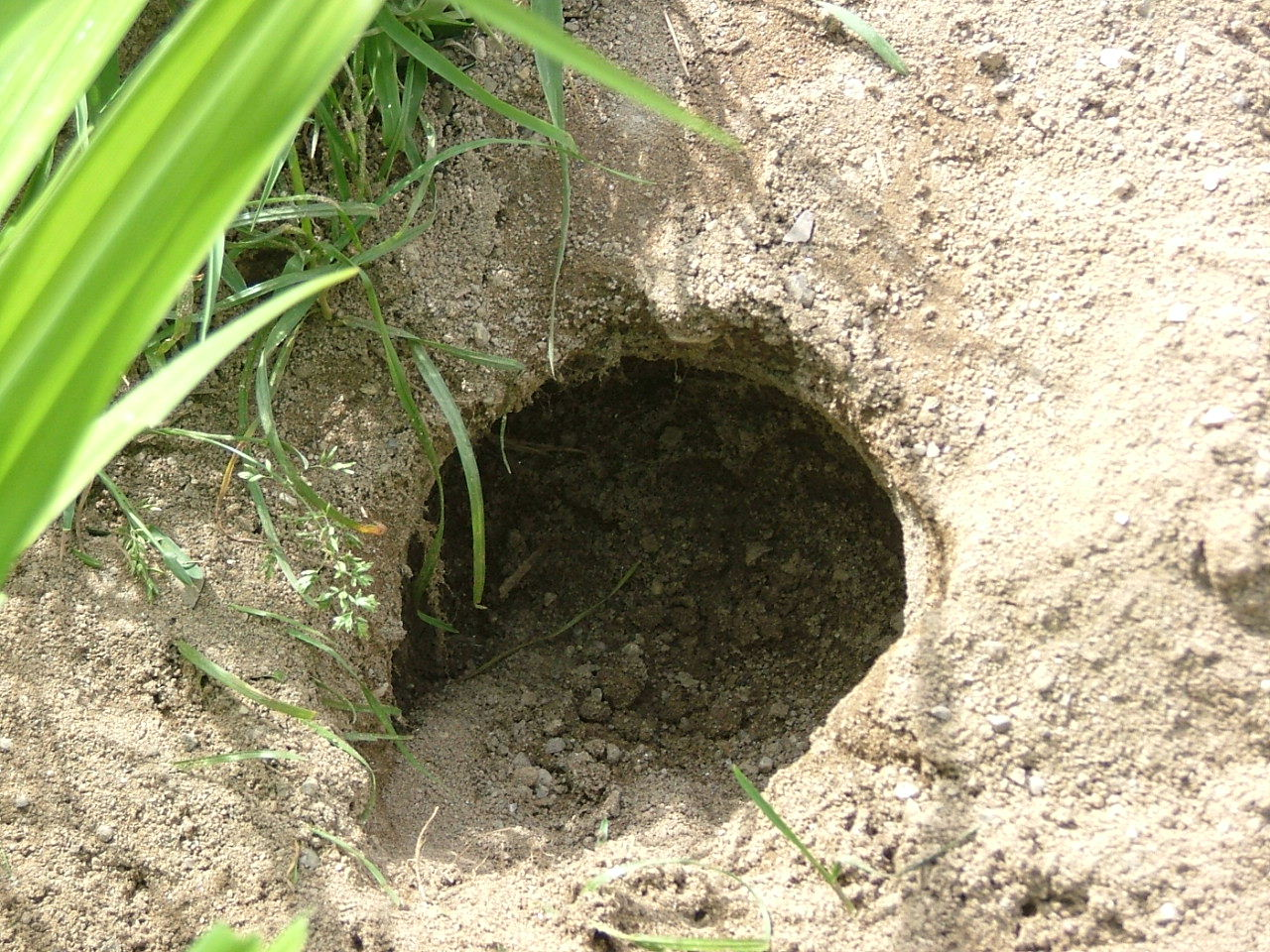
Finished burrow

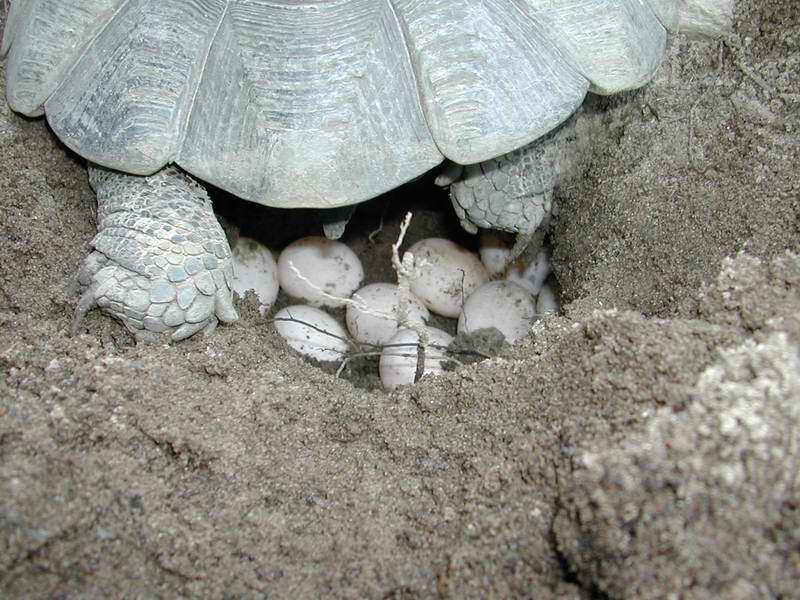
Laying eggs
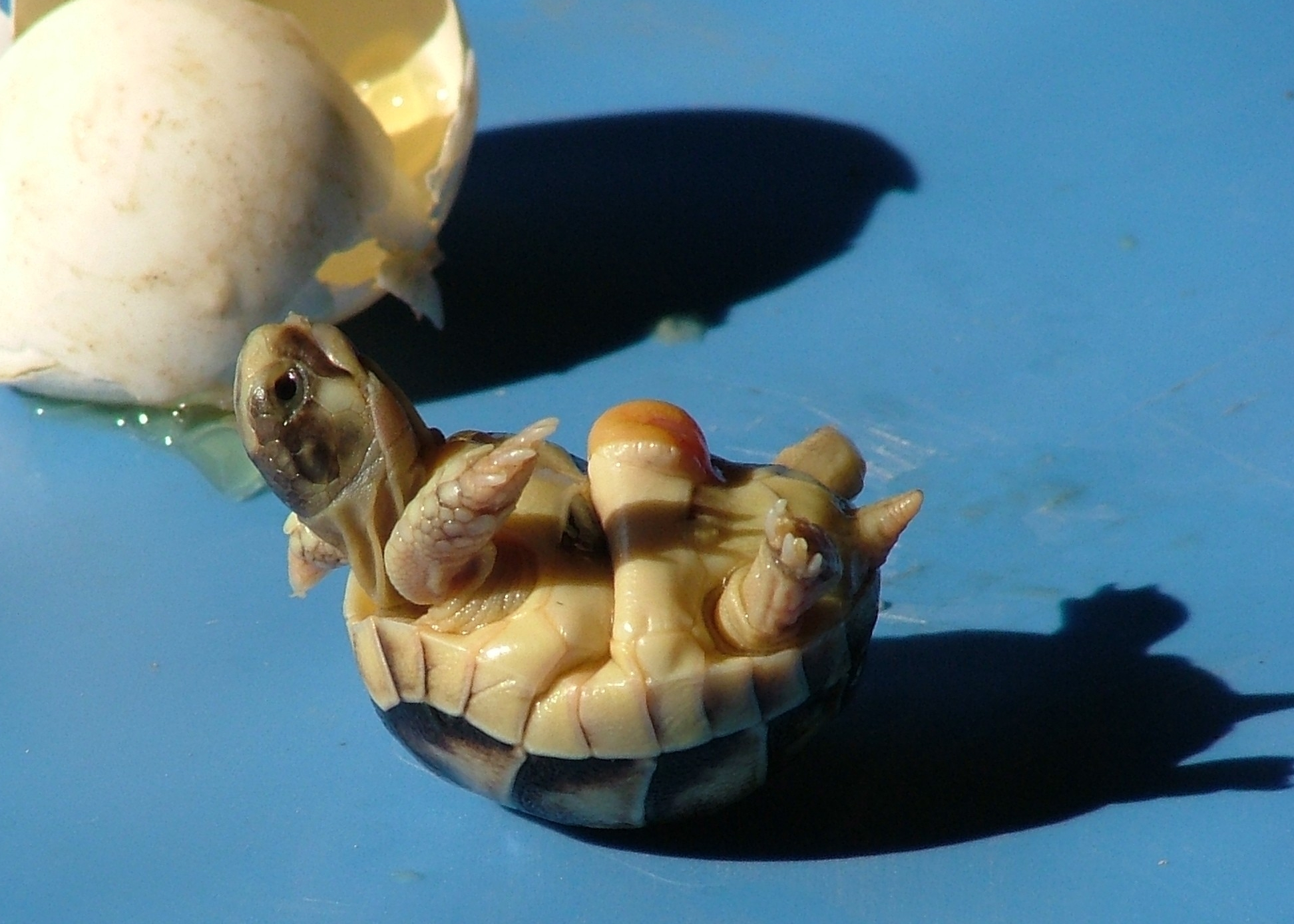
Free at last

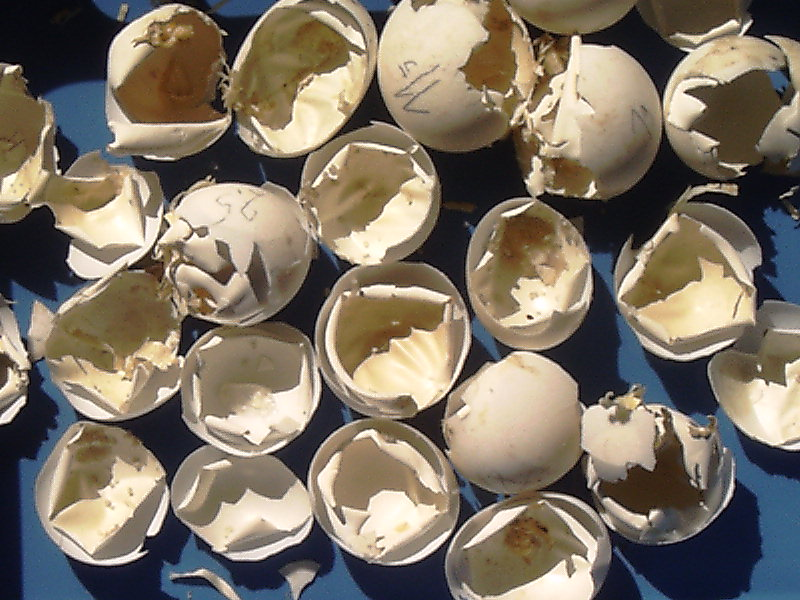
Egg shells with skins

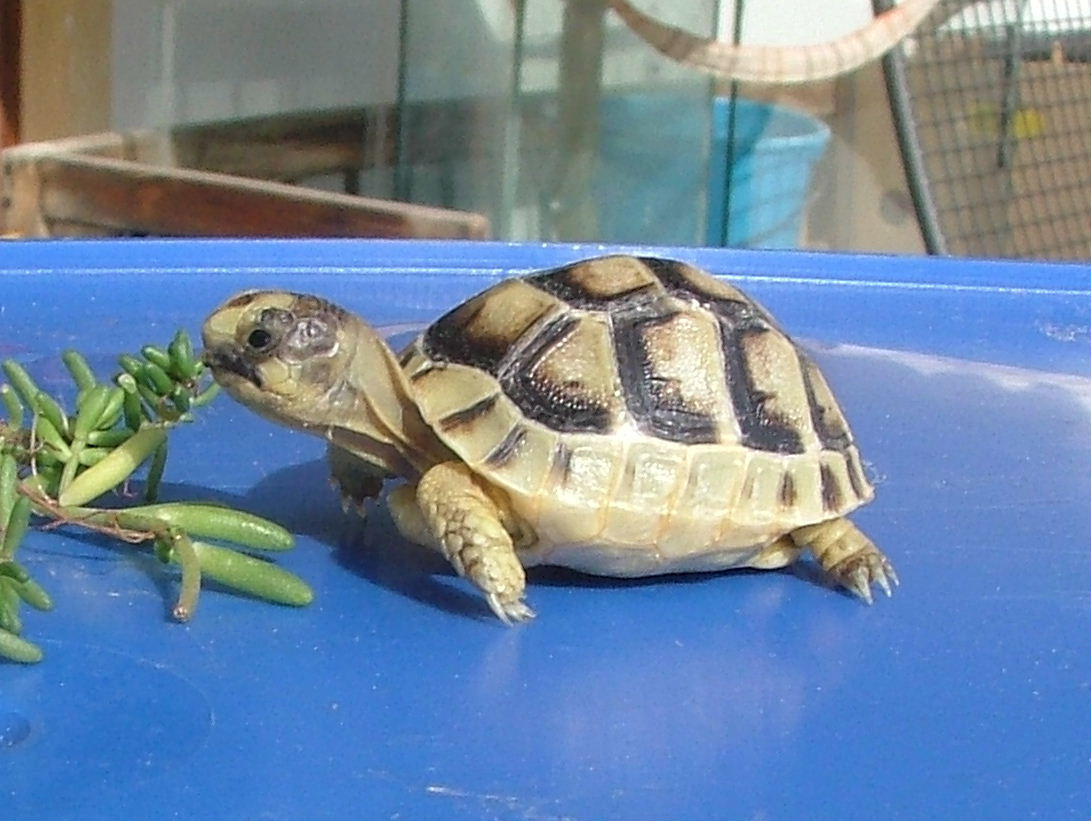
T. marginata young

Terrarium for raising young

== In captivity ==
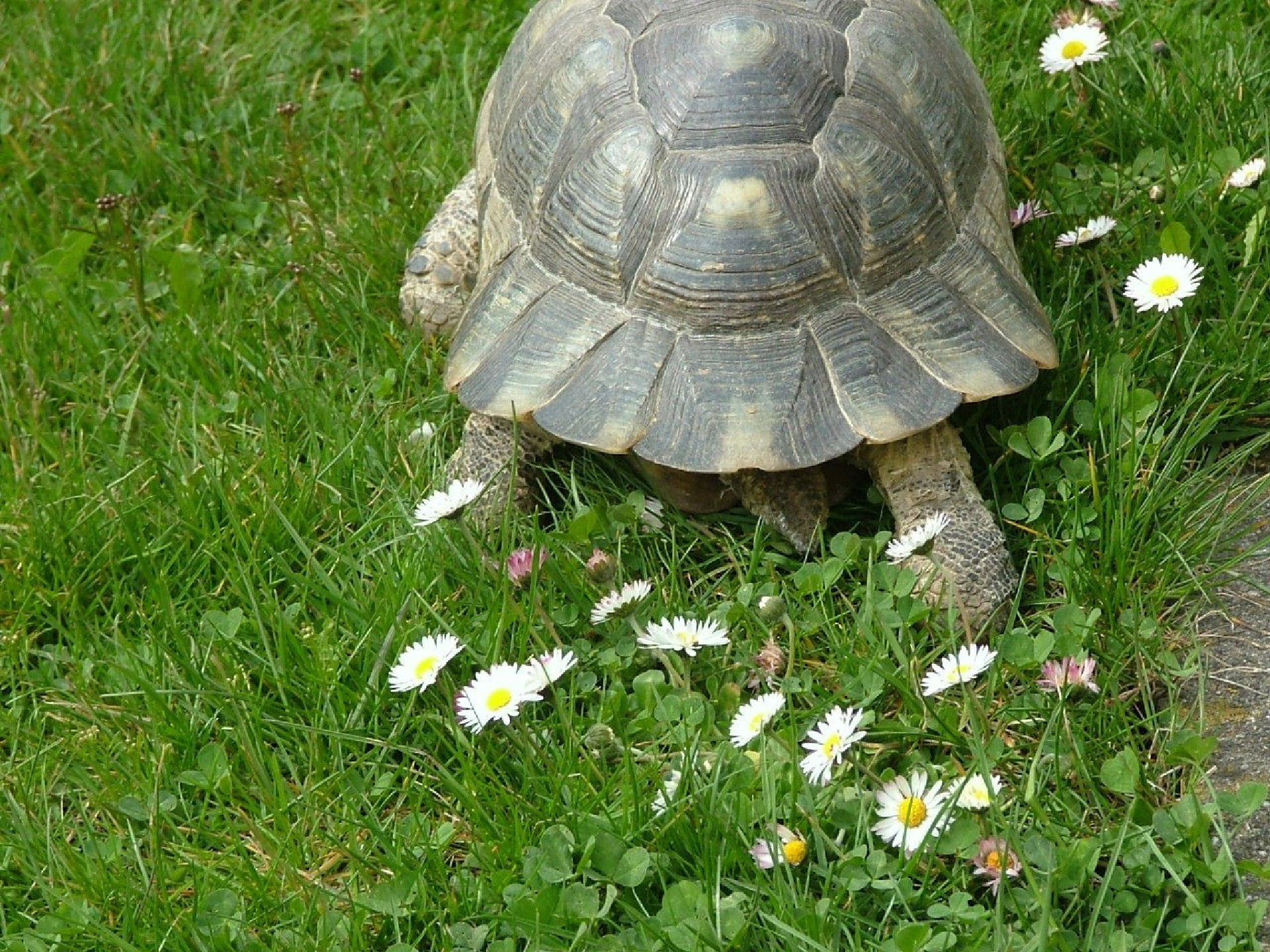
The caudal plate (above the tail) is not divided as in Hermann's tortoise.

Marginated tortoises (Testudo marginata) are large, strictly herbivorous tortoises native to southern Europe. In captivity, they are commonly kept as pets due to their hardy nature and calm disposition.

=== Diet ===
Marginated tortoises feed exclusively on plant matter. In the wild, their diet consists primarily of grasses, weeds, and fibrous plants. In captivity, they should be provided a high-fiber, low-sugar, and low-protein diet to replicate natural foraging conditions. Suitable foods include collard greens, mustard greens, turnip greens, dandelion greens, hay, and other dark leafy greens. Lettuce is generally avoided due to its low nutritional value and high water content. Calcium supplementation is commonly provided to support shell and bone health.

=== Housing ===
Adult marginated tortoises require a spacious enclosure, typically 6–8 feet (1.8–2.4 m) in length and approximately 4 feet (1.2 m) in width, to allow for adequate movement, exercise, and foraging behavior. Enclosures may be indoor, outdoor, or a combination of both depending on climate. Substrates commonly include organic topsoil, soil-sand mixes, or other diggable materials that allow for burrowing.

=== Temperature and Lighting ===
Marginated tortoises require a temperature gradient within their enclosure. The cooler end is generally maintained between 70–78°F (21–26°C), while the warmer end ranges from 80–85°F (27–29°C). A basking area with temperatures of 95–105°F (35–40°C) is provided to facilitate thermoregulation.

Ultraviolet B (UVB) lighting is necessary in indoor enclosures to support vitamin D₃ synthesis and calcium metabolism. Access to natural sunlight is also beneficial when conditions permit.

=== Humidity and Hydration ===
Although native to relatively dry regions, marginated tortoises benefit from moderate humidity, particularly during growth. Shallow water dishes are typically provided to allow drinking and soaking. Juveniles may be soaked periodically to prevent dehydration.

=== Behavior and Enrichment ===
Marginated tortoises are generally terrestrial and spend much of their time walking, grazing, and burrowing. Environmental enrichment may include varied terrain, natural obstacles, edible plants, and sheltered areas. They are primarily solitary and are usually housed individually, especially adult males, which may display territorial behavior.

=== Brumation ===
In the wild, marginated tortoises undergo brumation, a period of dormancy during cooler months. In captivity, brumation is sometimes practiced by experienced keepers, though it is not required for general care and reproduction unless breeding is intended.

=== Lifespan ===
With proper care, marginated tortoises are long-lived and commonly reach 50–70 years of age, with some individuals living longer.

== Gallery ==
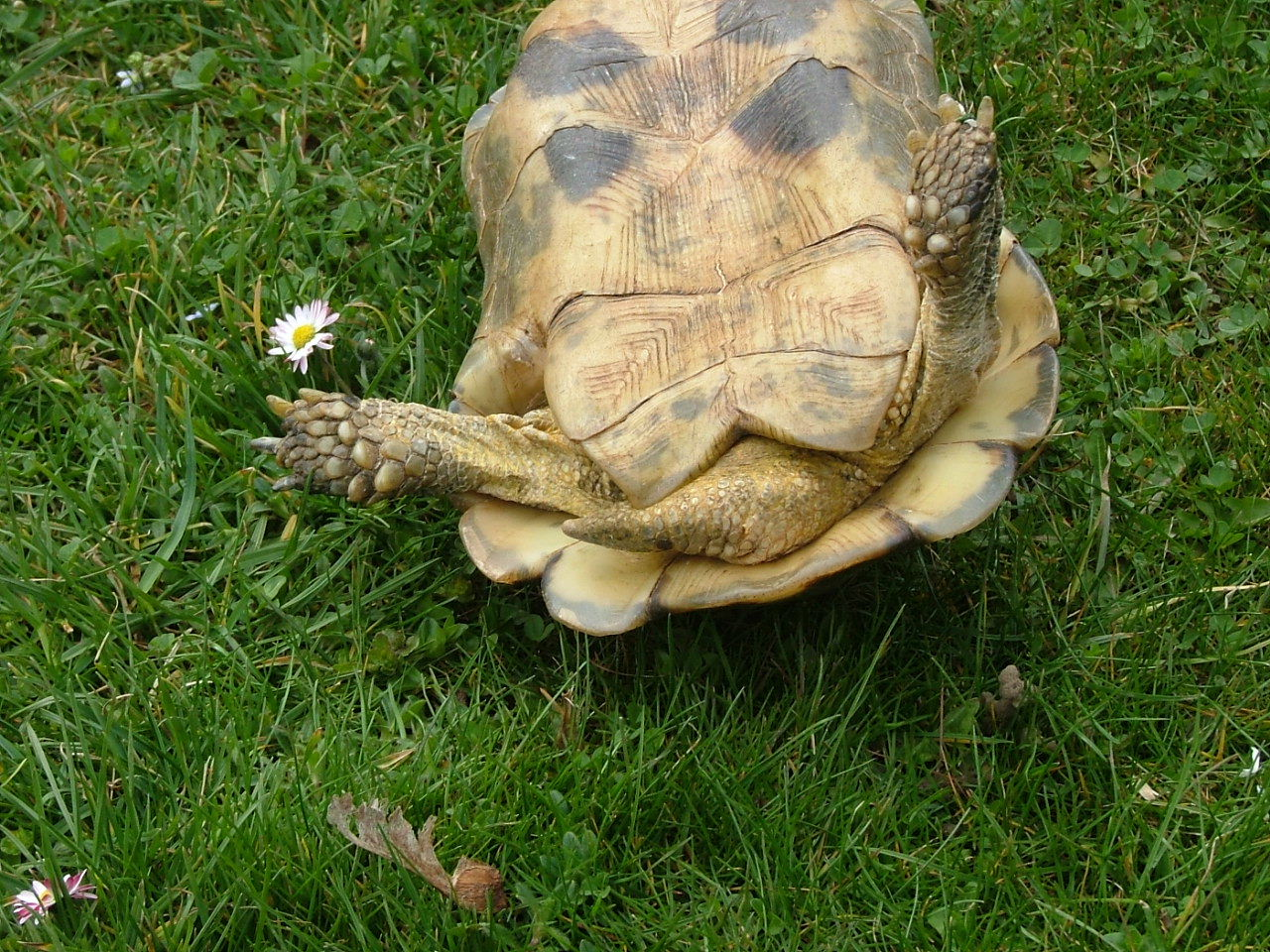
A male T. marginata marginata, identified by the long tail with broad base

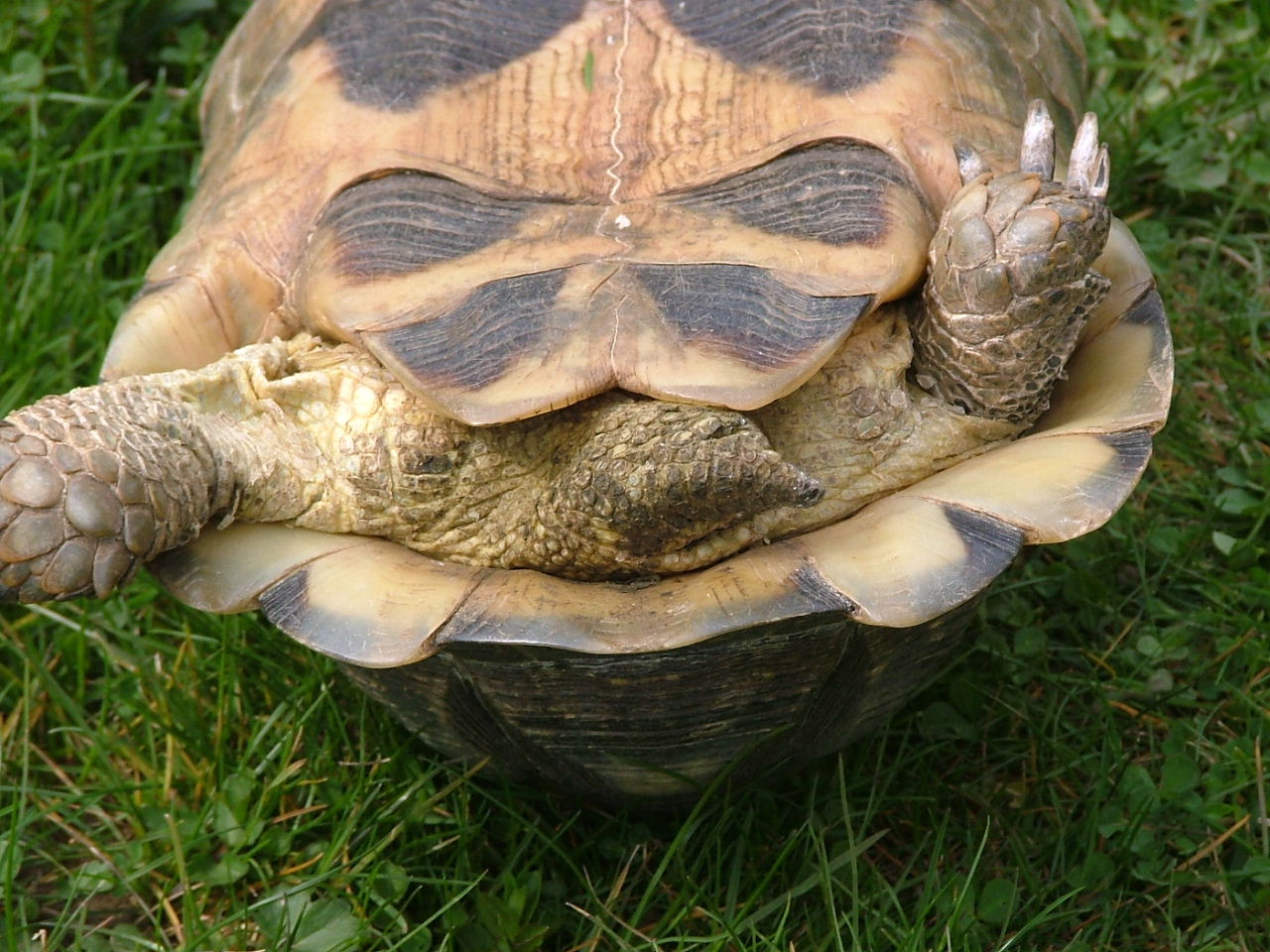
A female T. marginata with a broad-edged carapace: The cloacal opening is visible on the tail.

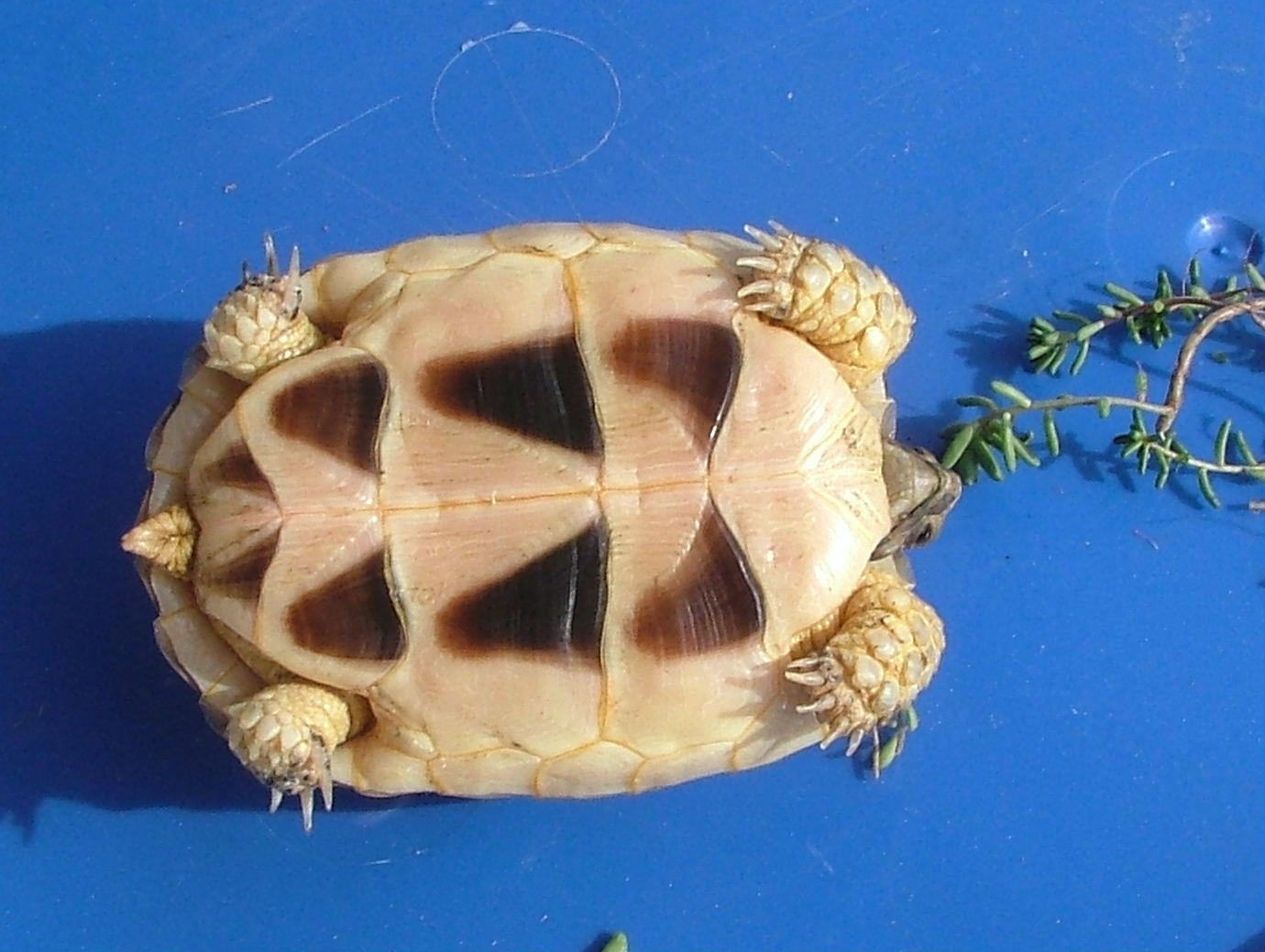
A young T. marginata on its back

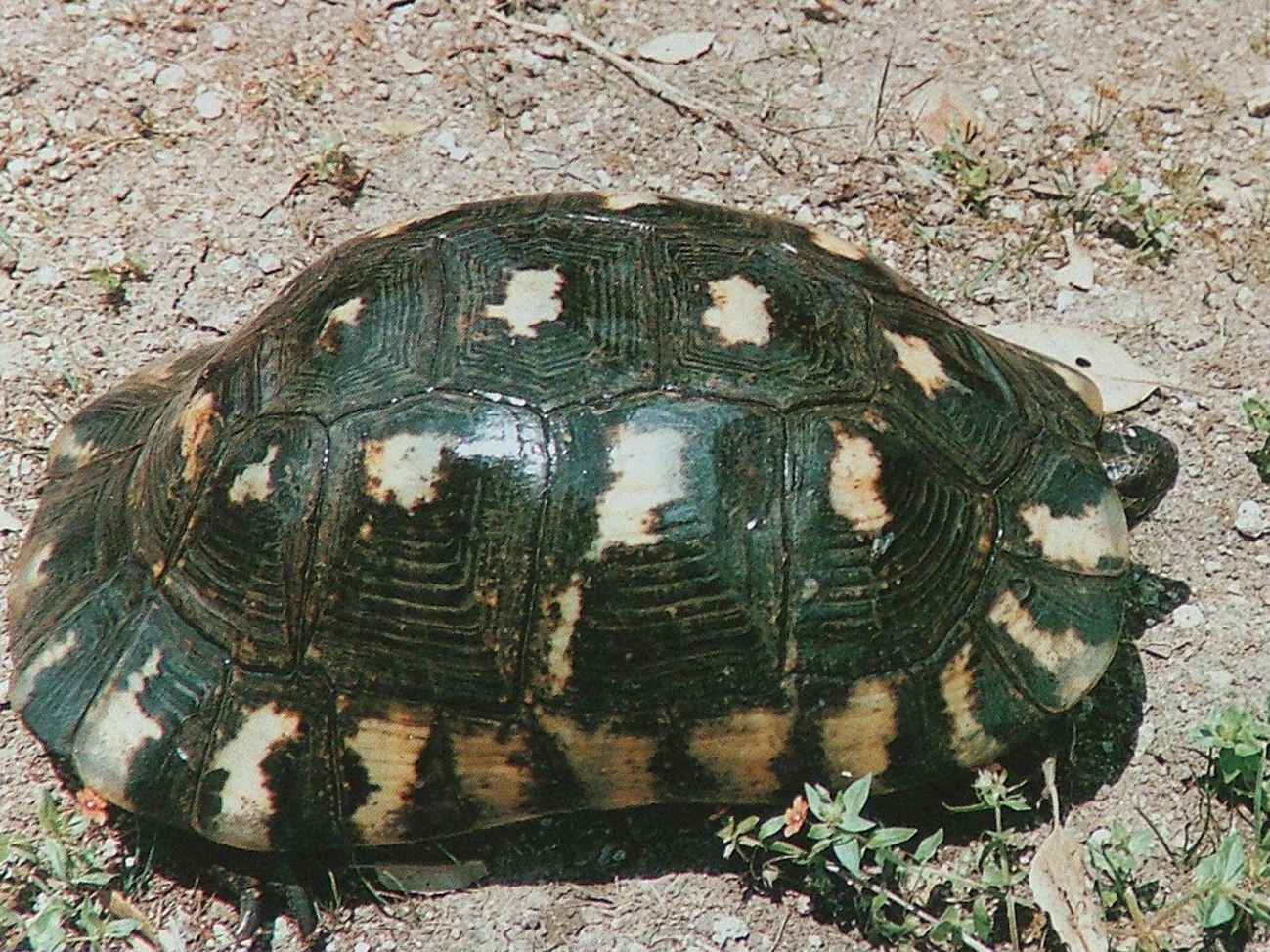
Old T. m. sarda

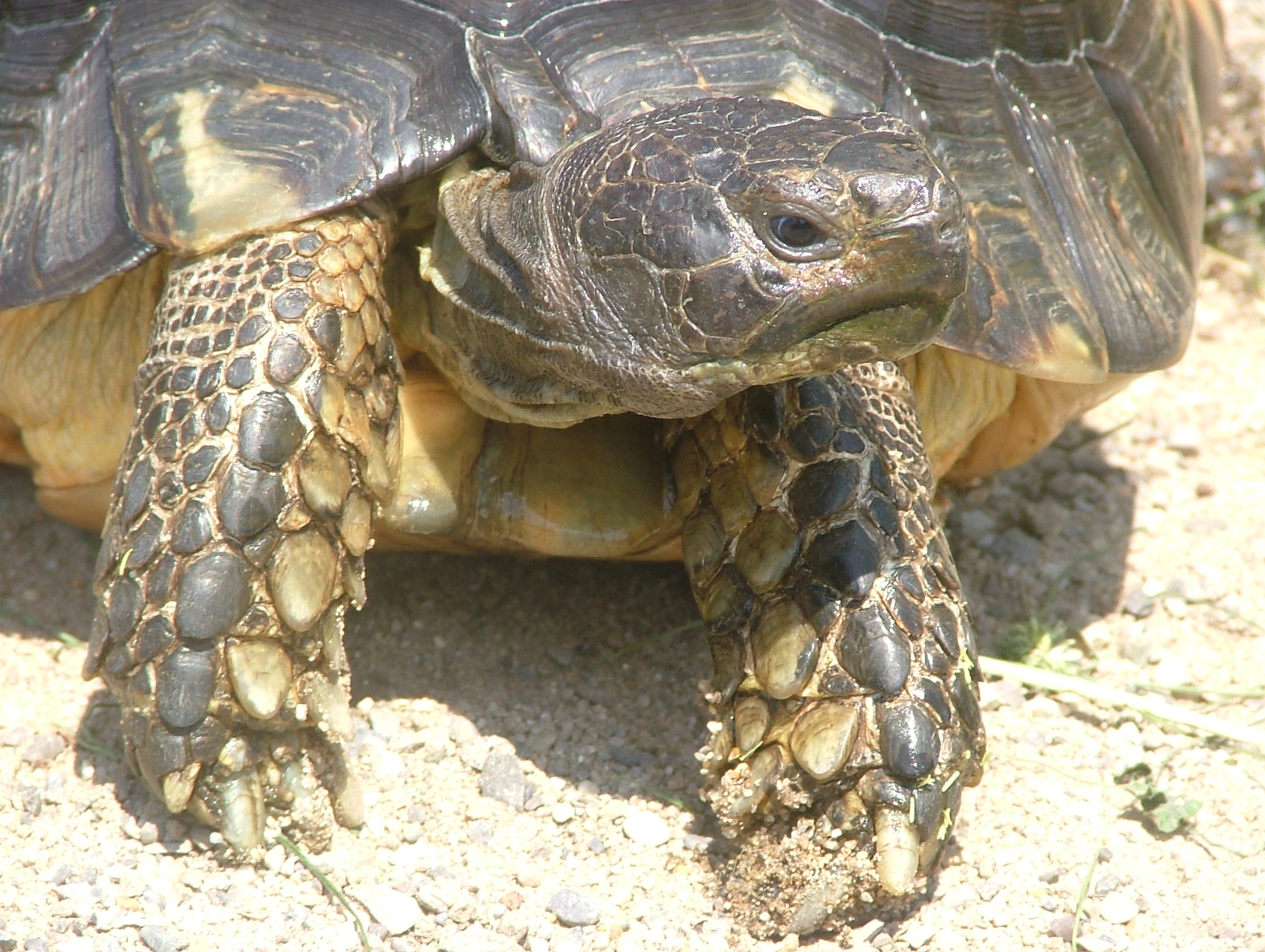
T. marginata

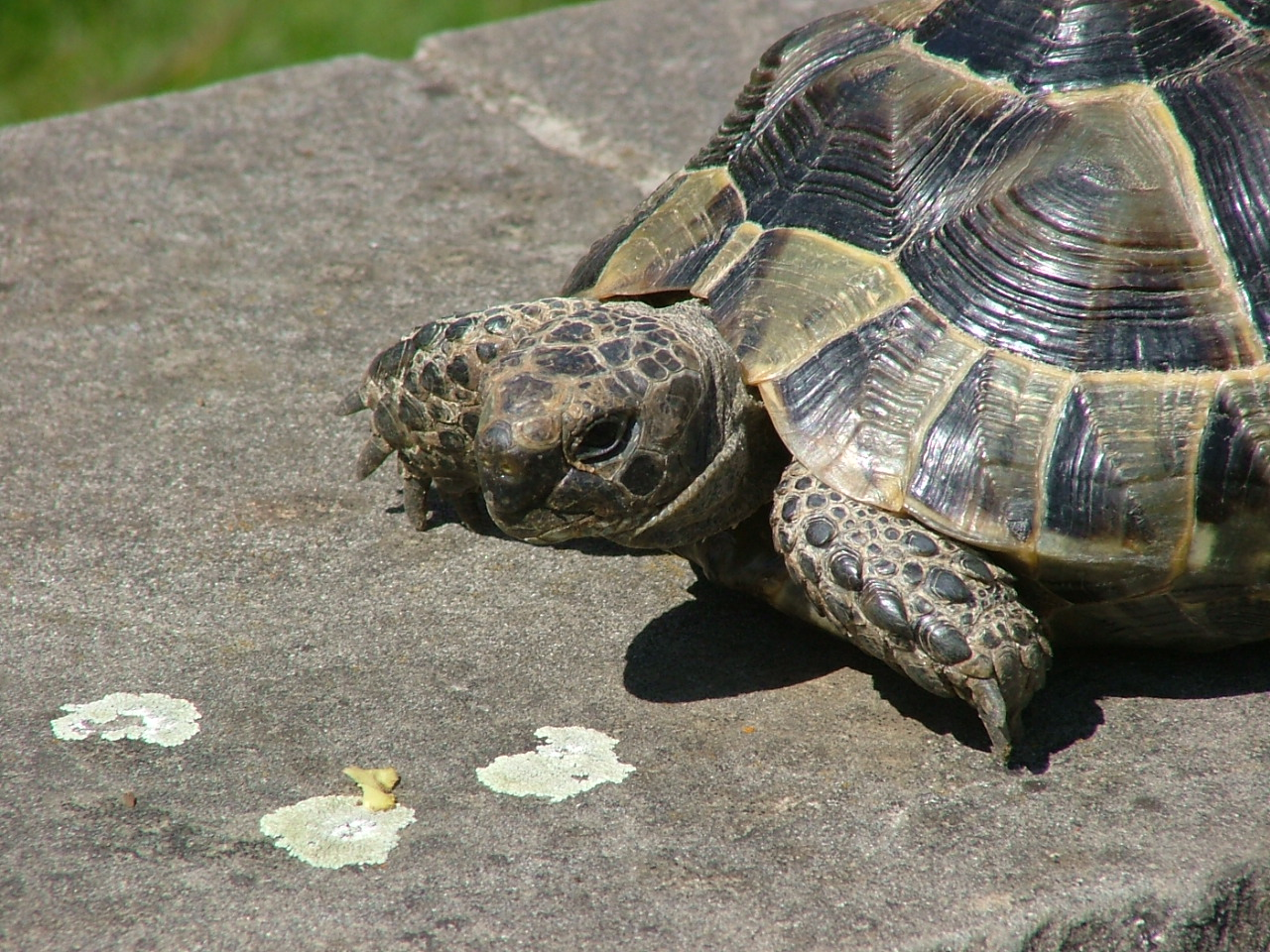
Greek tortoise, T. graeca

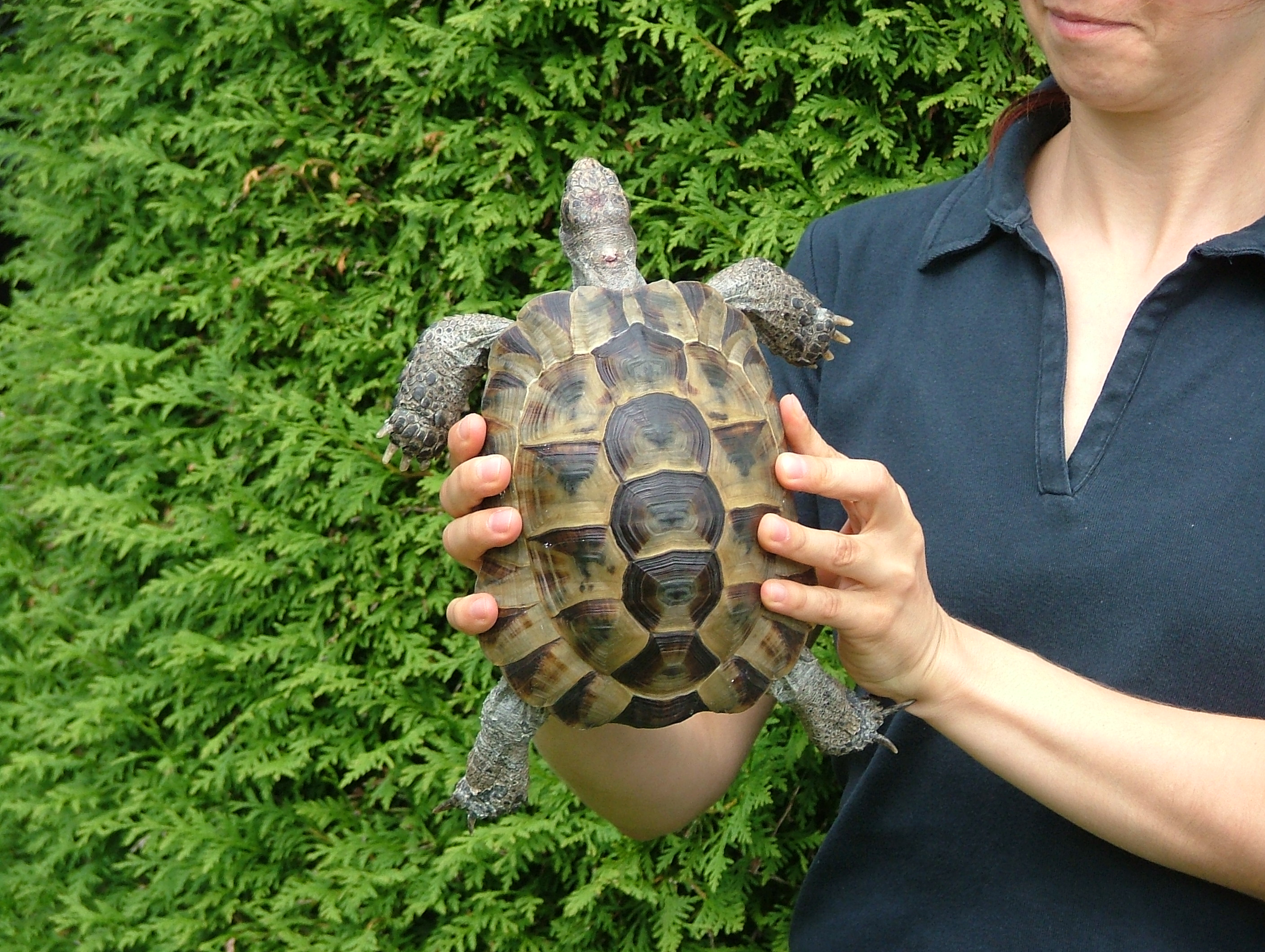
Hybrid, T. marginata × T. graeca (father × mother)

== See also ==
- List of reptiles of Italy

== Bibliography ==
- Avise John C., Bowen Brian W., Lamb Trip, Meylan Anne B., Bermingham Eldredge (1992). "Mitochondrial DNA evolution at a turtle's pace: evidence for low genetic variability and reduced microevolutionary rate in the Testudines". Mol. Biol. Evol. 9 (3): 457–473. doi:10.1093/oxfordjournals.molbev.a040735. PMID 1584014.
- Bartlett, Richard; Bartlett, Patricia (1996). Turtles and Tortoises: Everything About Selection, Care, Nutrition, Breeding, and Behavior (Complete Pet Owner's Manual). Barron's Educational Series. ISBN 0-8120-9712-2.
- De Vosjoli, Phillipe (1997). General Care and Maintenance of Popular Tortoises (The Herpetocultural Library Series). Advanced Vivarium Systems. ISBN 1-882770-37-4.
- Fritz Uwe, Kiroký Pavel, Kami Hajigholi, Wink Michael (2005). "Environmentally caused dwarfism or a valid species – Is Testudo weissingeri Bour, 1996 a distinct evolutionary lineage? New evidence from mitochondrial and nuclear genomic markers" (PDF). Molecular Phylogenetics and Evolution. 37 (2): 389–401. Bibcode:2005MolPE..37..389F. doi:10.1016/j.ympev.2005.03.007. PMID 16223676.
- Fritz Uwe, Auer Markus, Bertolero Albert, Cheylan Marc, Fattizzo Tiziano, Hundsdörfer Anna K., Sampayo Marcos Martín, Pretus Joan L., Široký Pavel, Wink Michael (2006). "A rangewide phylogeography of Hermann's tortoise, Testudo hermanni (Reptilia: Testudines: Testudinidae): implications for taxonomy" (PDF). Zoologica Scripta. 35 (5): 531–548. doi:10.1111/j.1463-6409.2006.00242.x. S2CID 86110728.
- Georgialis Georgios L., Kear Benjamin P. (2013). "The fossil turtles of Greece: An overview of taxonomy and distribution" (PDF). Geobios. 46 (4): 299–311. Bibcode:2013Geobi..46..299G. doi:10.1016/j.geobios.2013.05.001. Archived from the original (PDF) on 8 August 2017.
- Mayer, Richard (1992). Europäische Landschildkröten: Leben - Haltung - Zucht. AVA Agrar Verlag. ISBN 3-924809-10-0. (in German).
- van Dijk, P.P.; Lymberakis, P.; Böhme, W. (2004). "Testudo marginata". IUCN Red List of Threatened Species. 2004 e.T21653A201295229. doi:10.2305/IUCN.UK.2004.RLTS.T21653A201295229.en. Listed as Species of Less Concern (LR/lc v2.3).
- van der Kuyl Antoinette C., Ballasina Donato L. Ph., Dekker John T., Maas Jolanda, Willemsen Ronald E., Goudsmit Jaap (2002). "Phylogenetic Relationships among the Species of the Genus Testudo (Testudines: Testudinidae) Inferred from Mitochondrial 12S rRNA Gene Sequences". Mol. Phylogenet. Evol. 22 (2): 174–183. Bibcode:2002MolPE..22..174V. doi:10.1006/mpev.2001.1052. PMID 11820839.
