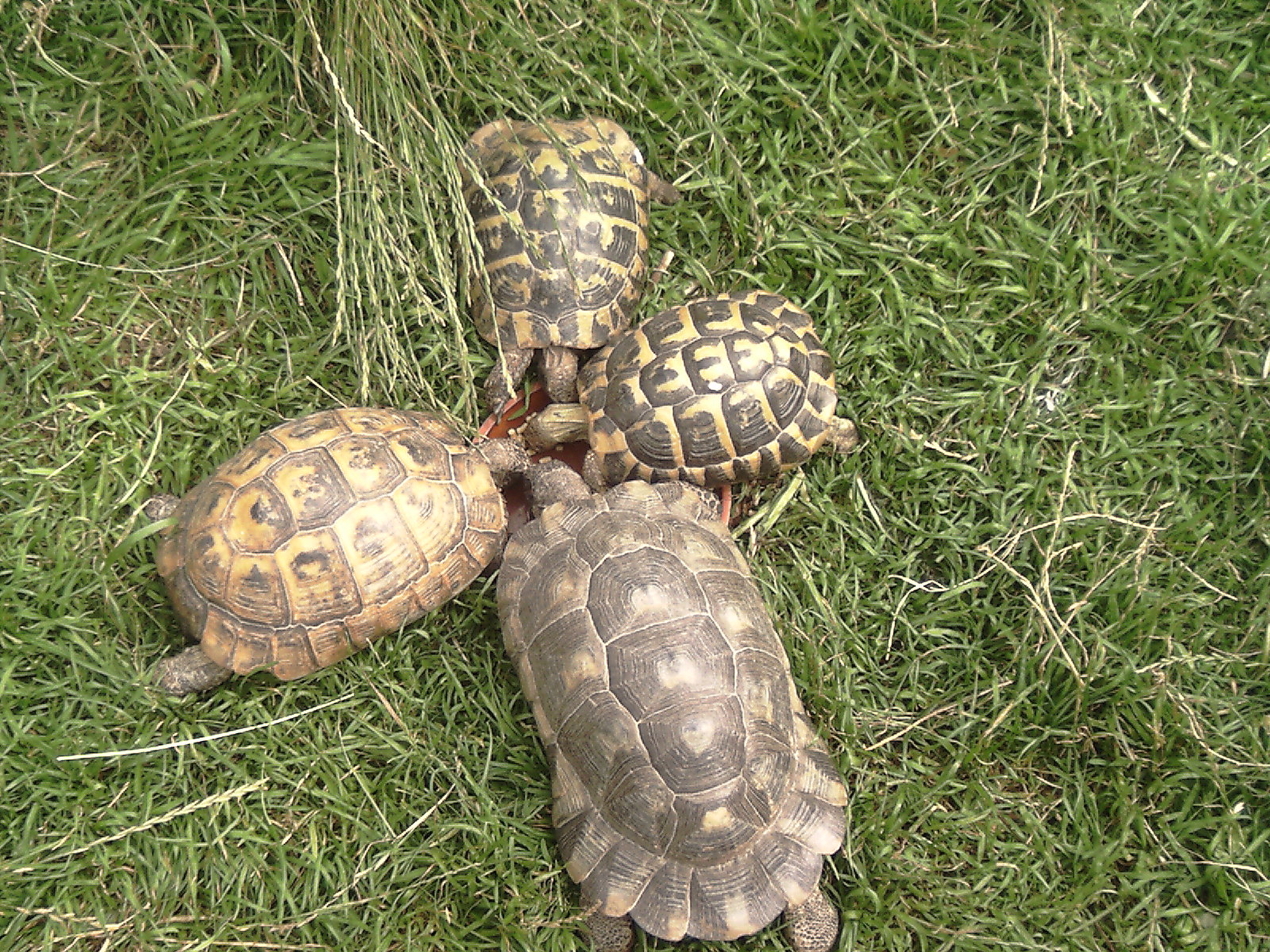
- Four tortoises of the genus Testudo. Clockwise from left: Testudo graeca ibera Testudo hermanni boettgeri Testudo hermanni hermanni Testudo marginata sarda.

Scientific classification
- Kingdom: Animalia
- Phylum: Chordata
- Class: Reptilia
- Order: Testudines
- Suborder: Cryptodira
- Family: Testudinidae
- Genus: Testudo; Linnaeus, 1758

Type species
- Testudo graeca Linnaeus, 1758
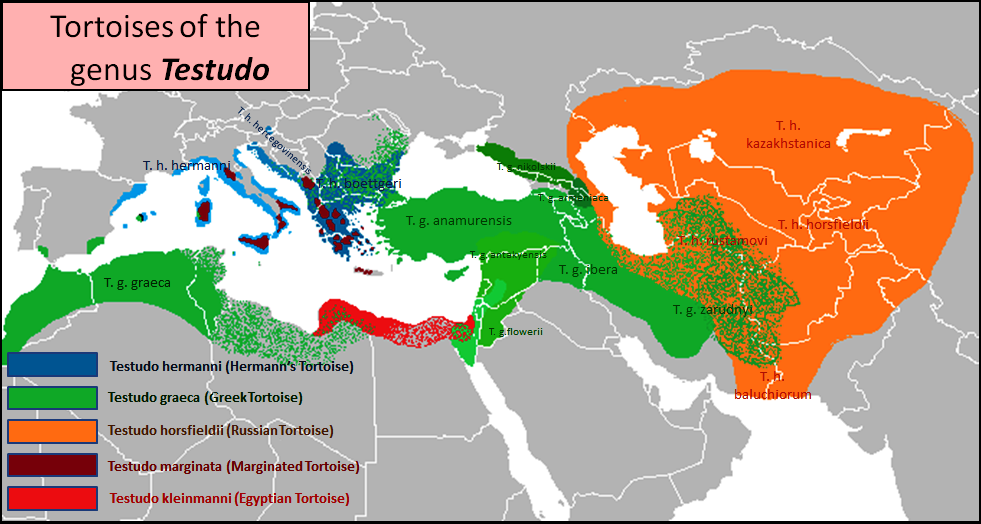
- Distribution of the genus Testudo, showing overlaps and subspecies

Synonyms
- Furculachelys Highfield, 1990; Chersus Gmira, 1993; and see text.

= Testudo (genus) =

Testudo Temporal range: Miocene–Present

Genus of tortoises

Testudo, the Mediterranean tortoises, are a genus of tortoises found in North Africa, Western Asia, and Europe. Several species are under threat in the wild, mainly from habitat destruction.

== Background ==
They are small tortoises, ranging in length from 7.0 to 35 cm (2.8 to 13.8 in) and in weight from 0.7 to 7.0 kg (1.5 to 15.4 lb).

== Systematics ==
The systematics and taxonomy of Testudo is notoriously problematic. Highfield and Martin commented:

Synonymies on Testudo are notoriously difficult to compile with any degree of accuracy. The status of species referred has undergone a great many changes, each change introducing an additional level of complexity and making bibliographic research on the taxa extremely difficult. Most early and not a few later checklists contain a very high proportion of entirely spurious entries, and a considerable number of described species are now considered invalid – either because they are homonyms, non-binomial or for some other reason.

Since then, DNA sequence data have increasingly been used in systematics, but in Testudines (turtles and tortoises), its usefulness is limited: In some of these, at least mtDNA is known to evolve more slowly in these than in most other animals. Paleobiogeographical considerations suggest the rate of evolution of the mitochondrial 12S rRNA gene is 1.0-1.6% per million years for the last dozen million years or so in the present genus and ntDNA evolution rate has been shown to vary strongly even between different population of T. hermanni; this restricts sequence choice for molecular systematics and makes the use of molecular clocks questionable.

The following extant species in the following subgenera are placed here:

- Genus Testudo
  - Subgenus Agrionemys
    - Russian tortoise or Horsfield's tortoise, T. horsfieldii
      - Subspecies:
        - Central Asian tortoise, T. horsfieldii horsfieldii
        - Fergana Valley steppe tortoise, T. horsfieldii bogdanovi
        - Kazakhstan steppe tortoise, T. horsfieldii kazakhstanica
        - Turkmenistan steppe tortoise, T. horsfieldii kuznetzovi
        - Kopet-Dag steppe tortoise, T. horsfieldii rustamovi
  - Subgenus Chersine
    - Hermann's tortoise, T. hermanni
      - Subspecies:
        - Eastern Hermann's tortoise, T. hermanni boettgeri
        - Western Hermann's tortoise, T. hermanni hermanni
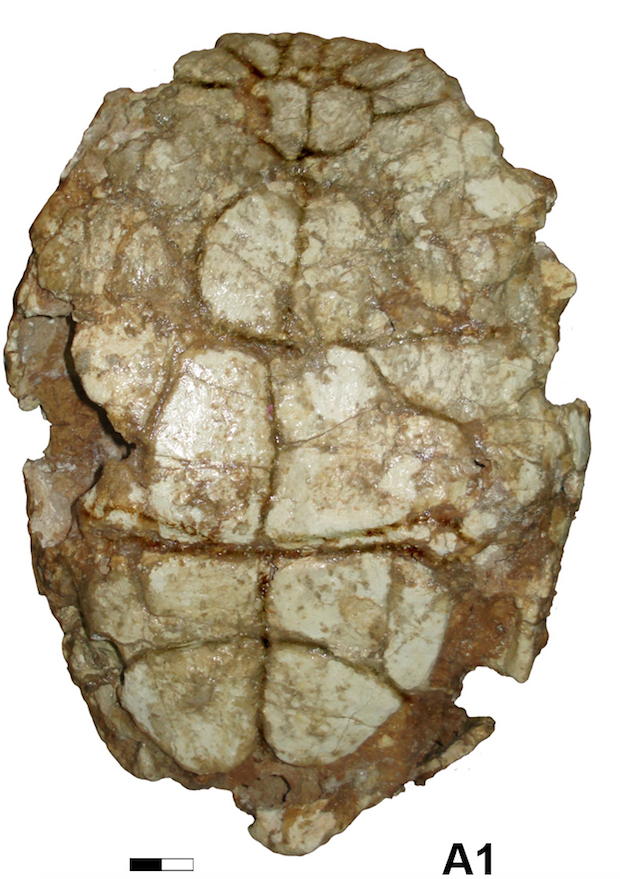
  - †Testudo hellenica (Miocene)
    Subgenus Testudo
    - Spur-thighed tortoise, Greek tortoise or common tortoise, T. graeca
      - Subspecies:
        - Mediterranean spur-thighed tortoise, T. graeca graeca
        - Araxes tortoise, T. graeca armeniaca
        - Buxton's tortoise, T. graeca buxtoni
        - Cyrenaican spur-thighed tortoise, T. graeca cyrenaica
        - Asia Minor tortoise, T. graeca ibera
        - Morocco tortoise, T. graeca marokkensis
        - Nabeul tortoise, T. graeca nabeulensis
        - Souss Valley tortoise, T. graeca soussensis
        - Mesopotamian tortoise, T. graeca terrestris
        - Iranian tortoise, T. graeca zarudnyi
    - Egyptian tortoise or Kleinmann's tortoise, T. kleinmanni
    - Marginated tortoise, T. marginata

The following extinct species on the following are placed here:

- Genus Testudo
  - Subgenus Chersine
    - †Testudo lunellensis Almera & Bofill, 1903
    - †Testudo oughlamensis Gmira et al., 2013
  - Subgenus Testudo
    - †Testudo brevitesta Vlachos & Tsoukala, 2016
    - †Testudo pecorinii Abbazzi et al., 2008
    - †Testudo kenitrensis Gmira, 1993
    - †Testudo transcaucasica
    - †Testudo binagadensis
    - †Testudo changshanensis Wei et al., 1975
    - †Testudo sahakyanae Vlachos and Vasilyan, 2026
  - Incerti subgeneris
    - †Testudo hellenica Garcia et al., 2020
    - †Testudo marmorum Gaudry, 1862

The first two are more distinct and ancient lineages than the closely related latter three species. Arguably, T. horsfieldii belongs in a new genus (Agrionemys) on the basis of the shape of its carapace and plastron, and its distinctness is supported by DNA sequence analysis. Likewise, a separate genus Eurotestudo has recently been proposed for T. hermanni; these three lineages were distinct by the Late Miocene as evidenced by the fossil record. Whether these splits will eventually be accepted remains to be seen. The genus Chersus has been proposed to unite the Egyptian and marginated tortoises which have certain DNA sequence similarities, but their ranges are (and apparently always were) separated by their closest relative T. graeca and the open sea and thus, chance convergent haplotype sorting would better explain the biogeographical discrepancy.

Conversely, the Greek tortoise is widespread and highly diverse. In this and other species, a high number of subspecies has been described, but not all generally accepted, and several (such as the "Negev tortoise" and the "dwarf marginated tortoise") are now considered to be local morphs. Some, such as the Tunisian tortoise, have even been separated as a separate genus Furculachelys, but this is not supported by more recent studies.

== Mating ==
Testudo spp. are promiscuous creatures and they follow a polyandrous mating system. Mating involves a courtship ritual of mechanical, olfactory and auditory displays elicited from the male to coerce a female into accepting copulation. Courtship displays are very energetically costly for males, especially because females tend to run away from courting males. The male will chase her, exerting more energy and elaborate displays of ramming and biting. Females are able to judge a male's genetic quality through these displays; only healthy males are able to perform costly courting rituals, suggesting endurance rivalry. These are considered honest signals that are then used to influence pre- and post-copulatory choice, as females are the choosy sex.

Female mate choice offers no direct benefits (such as access to food or territory or parental care). There are, however, indirect benefits of mating with multiple males. Engaging in a polyandrous mating system offers a female guaranteed fertilization, higher offspring diversity and sperm competition to ensure that eggs are fertilized by a high quality male. This is in respect to the "good genes" hypothesis that females receive indirect benefits through her offspring by mating with a quality male, "a male's contribution to a female's fitness is restricted to [his] genes" (Cutuli, G. et al., 2014).

Mating order has no influence on paternity of a clutch so a female's inclination to mate with multiple males and her ability to store sperm allows for sperm competition and suggests cryptic female choice. However, some species do show size-assortative, T. marginata, for example, where large males breed with large females and small males breed with small females. Other species form hierarchies; during male-to-male competition the more aggressive male is considered alpha. Alpha males are more aggressive with their courting as well and have higher mounting success rate than beta males.

A female's reproductive tract contains sperm storage tubules and she is capable of storing sperm for up to four years. This sperm remains viable and when she goes a breeding season without encountering a male she is able to fertilize her eggs with the stored sperm. Storing sperm can also result in multiple paternity clutches; It is quite common among Testudo spp. females to lay a clutch that has been sired by multiple males. And females can lay one to four clutches a breeding season. Sexual dimorphism, promiscuity, long term sperm storage and elaborate courting rituals are factors that effect mate preference, sperm competition and cryptic female choice in genus Testudo.
