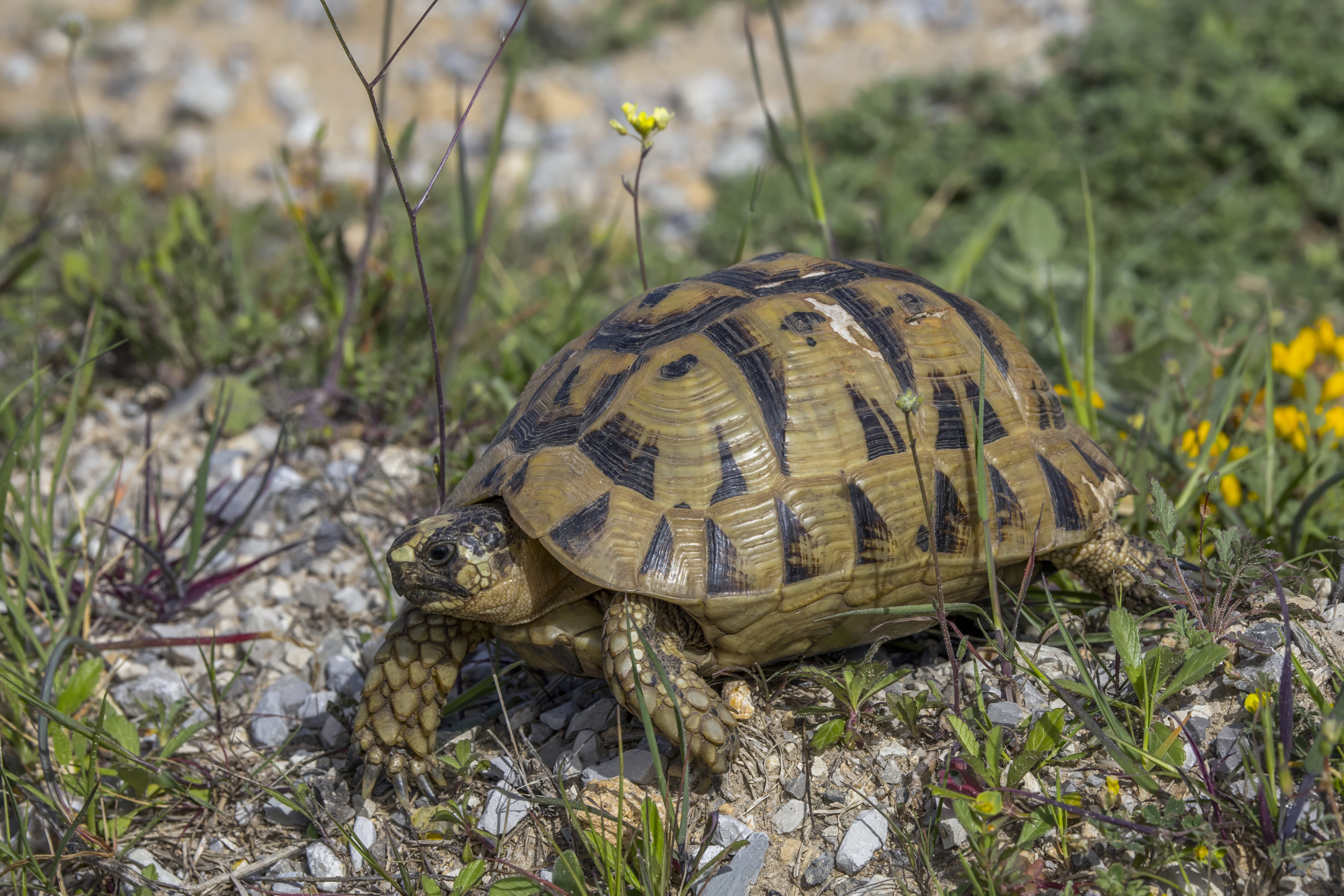
- T. g. nabeulensis male in Tunisia
- T. g. ibera in Turkey

Conservation status
- Vulnerable (IUCN 3.1)

Scientific classification
- Kingdom: Animalia
- Phylum: Chordata
- Class: Reptilia
- Order: Testudines
- Suborder: Cryptodira
- Family: Testudinidae
- Genus: Testudo
- Species: T. graeca

Binomial name
- Testudo graeca Linnaeus, 1758
- Note allopatric ranges of "Maghreb" (T. g. graeca) and "Greek" (T. g. ibera) populations

Synonyms
- List: T. g. graeca; Testudo graeca Linnaeus, 1758; Testudo pusilla Linnaeus, 1758; Chersine pusilla — Merrem, 1820; Testudo mauritanica A.M.C. Duméril & Bibron, 1835; Testudo mauritonica Kercado, 1835 (ex errore); Testudo whitei Bennett, 1836; Peltastes mauritanicus — Gray, 1873; Testudo graeca graeca — Mertens, 1946; Testudo gracea Nutaphand, 1979 (ex errore); Testudo whitie Highfield & Martin, 1989 (ex errore); Furculachelys whitei — Highfield, 1990; Testudo graeca sarda Ballasina, 1995 (nomen nudum); Testudo graeca whitei — Artner, 1996; T. g. anamurensis; Testudo graeca anamurensis Weissinger, 1987; Testudo ibera anamurensis — Highfield, 1990; Testudo terrestris anamurensis — David, 1994; Testudo anamurensis — Vetter, 2002; Testudo graeca amurensis Ferri, 2002 (ex errore); T. g. antakyensis; Testudo antakyensis Perälä, 1996; Testudo graeca antakyensis — Zwartepoorte, 2000; Testudo terrestris antakyensis — Bour, 2002; Testudo ibera antakyensis — Artner, 2003; T. g. armeniaca; Testudo graeca armeniaca Chkhikvadze, 1989 (nomen nudum); Testudo graeca armeniaca Chkhikvadze & Bakradze, 1991; Testudo graeca armaniaca Chkhikvadze & Bakradze, 1991 (ex errore); Testudo armeniaca — Vetter, 2002; Testudo terrestris armeniaca — Bour, 2002; T. g. buxtoni; ? Testudo ecaudata Pallas, 1814; Testudo buxtoni Boulenger, 1921; Testudo terrestris buxtoni — Bour, 2002; Testudo ibera buxtoni — Artner, 2003; ; T. g. cyrenaica; Testudo graeca cyrenaica Pieh & Perälä, 2002; Testudo cyrenaica — Vetter, 2002; Testudo cyrenaika Stettner, 2004 (ex errore); T. g. floweri; Testudo floweri Bodenheimer, 1935; Testudo graeca floweri — Mertens, 1946; Testudo terrestris floweri — David, 1994; Testudo ibera floweri — Artner, 2003; T. g. ibera; Testudo ibera Pallas, 1814; Chersus iberus — Brandt, 1852; Testudo iberia Blyth, 1853 (ex errore); Medaestia ibera — Wussow, 1916; Testudo ibera racovitzai Călinescu, 1931; Testudo graeca ibera — Mertens, 1946; Testudo ibera ibera — Gmira, 1993; Testudo terrestris ibera — David, 1994; T. g. lamberti; Testudo graeca lamberti Pieh & Perälä, 2004; Testudo lamberti — Perälä, 2004; T. g. marokkensis; Testudo graeca marokkensis Pieh & Perälä, 2004; Testudo marokkensis — Perälä, 2004; T. g. nabeulensis; ? Testudo flavominimaralis Highfield & Martin, 1989; Furculachelys nabeulensis Highfield, 1990; Testudo nabeulensis — Welch, 1994; ? Testudo graeca flavominimaralis — Artner, 1996; Testudo graeca nabeulensis — Artner, 1996; T. g. nikolskii; Testudo graeca nikolskii Chkhikvadze & Tuniyev, 1986; Testudo ibera nikolskii — Highfield, 1990; Testudo terrestris nikolskii — David, 1994; Testudo graeca niiolskii Paull, 1997 (ex errore); Testudo nikolskii — Vetter, 2002; T. g. pallasi; Testudo graeca pallasi Chkhikvadze, 1989 (nomen nudum); Testudo graeca pallasi Chkhikvadze & Bakradze, 2002; Testudo pallasi — Danilov & Milto, 2004; T. g. perses; Testudo perses Perälä, 2002; Testudo ibera perses — Artner, 2003; T. g. soussensis; Testudo graeca soussensis Pieh, 2001; Testudo soussensis — Vetter, 2002; T. g. terrestris; Testudo terrestris Forsskål, 1775; ? Testudo zolhafa Forsskål, 1831 (nomen nudum); ? Testudo zolkafa Forsskål, 1831 (nomen nudum); ? Testudo zohalfa Forsskål, 1835 (nomen nudum); Testudo graeca terrestris — Wermuth, 1958; Testudo terrestris terrestris — David, 1994; Testudo ibera terrestris — Artner, 2003; T. g. zarudnyi; Testudo zarudnyi Nikolsky, 1896; Testudo graeca zarudnyi — Mertens, 1946; Testudo ibera zarudnyi — Gmira, 1993; Testudo terrestris zarudnyi — David, 1994

= Greek tortoise =

Greek tortoise Temporal range: Pliocene–Holocene Possible Late Miocene record

Species of tortoise

The Greek tortoise (Testudo graeca), also known commonly as the Moorish tortoise and the spur-thighed tortoise, is a species of tortoise in the family Testudinidae. The species is a medium-sized herbivorous testudinid, widely distributed in the Mediterranean region.

T. graeca is recognized for its longevity, with verified lifespans exceeding 100 years and anecdotal reports suggesting ages over 125 years. Among reptiles, it has one of the largest known genomes.

== Geographic range ==
The geographic distribution of the Greek tortoise (Testudo graeca) includes North Africa, Southern Europe, and Southwest Asia. It is commonly found along the Black Sea coast of the Caucasus, extending from Anapa, Russia, to Sukhumi, Abkhazia, Georgia. Additional populations are present in parts of Georgia, Armenia, Iran, and Azerbaijan.

== Evolution ==
The oldest confirmed fossil attributed to Testudo graeca originates from the Early Pliocene of Greece. However, fossils tentatively identified as Testudo cf. graeca have also been reported from the Middle and Late Miocene of Greece and Turkey, suggesting a more ancient and geographically diverse origin.

== Characteristics ==
The Greek tortoise (Testudo graeca) is often confused with Hermann's tortoise (Testudo hermanni). However, notable differences enable them to be distinguished.

| Greek tortoise | Hermann's tortoise |
|---|---|
| Large symmetrical markings on the top of the head | Only small scales on the head |
| Large scales on the front legs | Small scales on the front legs |
| Undivided supracaudal scute over the tail | Supracaudal scute almost always divided |
| Notable spurs on each thigh | No spurs |
| Isolated flecks on the spine and rib plates | Isolated flecks only on the spinal plates |
| Dark central fleck on the underside | Two black bands on the underside |
| Shell somewhat oblong rectangular | Oval shell shape |
| Widely stretched spinal plates | Small spinal plates |
| Movable posterior plates on underside | Fixed plates on underside |
| No tail spur | Tail bears a spur at the tip |

== Subspecies ==
The classification of the Greek tortoise (Testudo graeca) into subspecies is complex and sometimes inconsistent due to its extensive distribution across North Africa, Southern Europe, and Southwest Asia. Diverse environmental conditions across this range have resulted in a wide array of morphological variations. As of 2023, at least 20 subspecies have been described, with the following 11 currently recognized as valid:

- T. g. graeca Linnaeus, 1758 – west-central Morocco
- T. g. marokkensis Pieh & Perälä, 2004 – northern Morocco
- T. g. whitei Bennett in White, 1836 – Algeria, Morocco, Spain
- T. g. nabeulensis Highfield, 1990 – Tunisia, Algeria, Lybia
- T. g. tripolitania Poterala, Rattay, Johnson, Buijlayyil, Kiraz & Ajay, 2024 – Libya
- T. g. cyrenaica Pieh & Perälä, 2002 – Libya
- T. g. ibera Pallas, 1814 – North Macedonia, Bulgaria, Greece, Kosovo, Serbia, Romania, Russia (Krasnodar), Georgia, Turkey
- T. g. armeniaca Chkhikvadze & Bakradse, 1991 – Armenia, Azerbaijan, Iran, Russia (Dagestan), Turkey
- T. g. buxtoni Boulenger, 1921 – Iran, Iraq, Turkey
- T. g. terrestris Forskål, 1775 – Jordan, Lebanon, Palestine, Syria, Turkey
- T. g. zarudnyi Nikolsky, 1896 – Iran

The recognition and delimitation of these subspecies are challenging due to overlapping morphological traits such as body size, shell shape, colour patterns, and the degree of curvature at the carapace edges. Some populations formerly assigned to T. graeca have since been reassigned to different species or genera.

Genetic diversity within T. graeca is further demonstrated by interbreeding between geographically distinct populations, resulting in variable offspring. For this reason, geographical origin is often considered the most reliable method of identification.

Among the most distinctive subspecies is the Tunisian tortoise (T. g. nabeulensis), noted for its bright colouration and small size. However, it is also one of the most sensitive, poorly suited for outdoor enclosures in temperate climates, and incapable of prolonged hibernation.

Populations from northeastern Turkey are notably robust, and include some of the largest individuals, weighing up to 7 kg (15 lb).

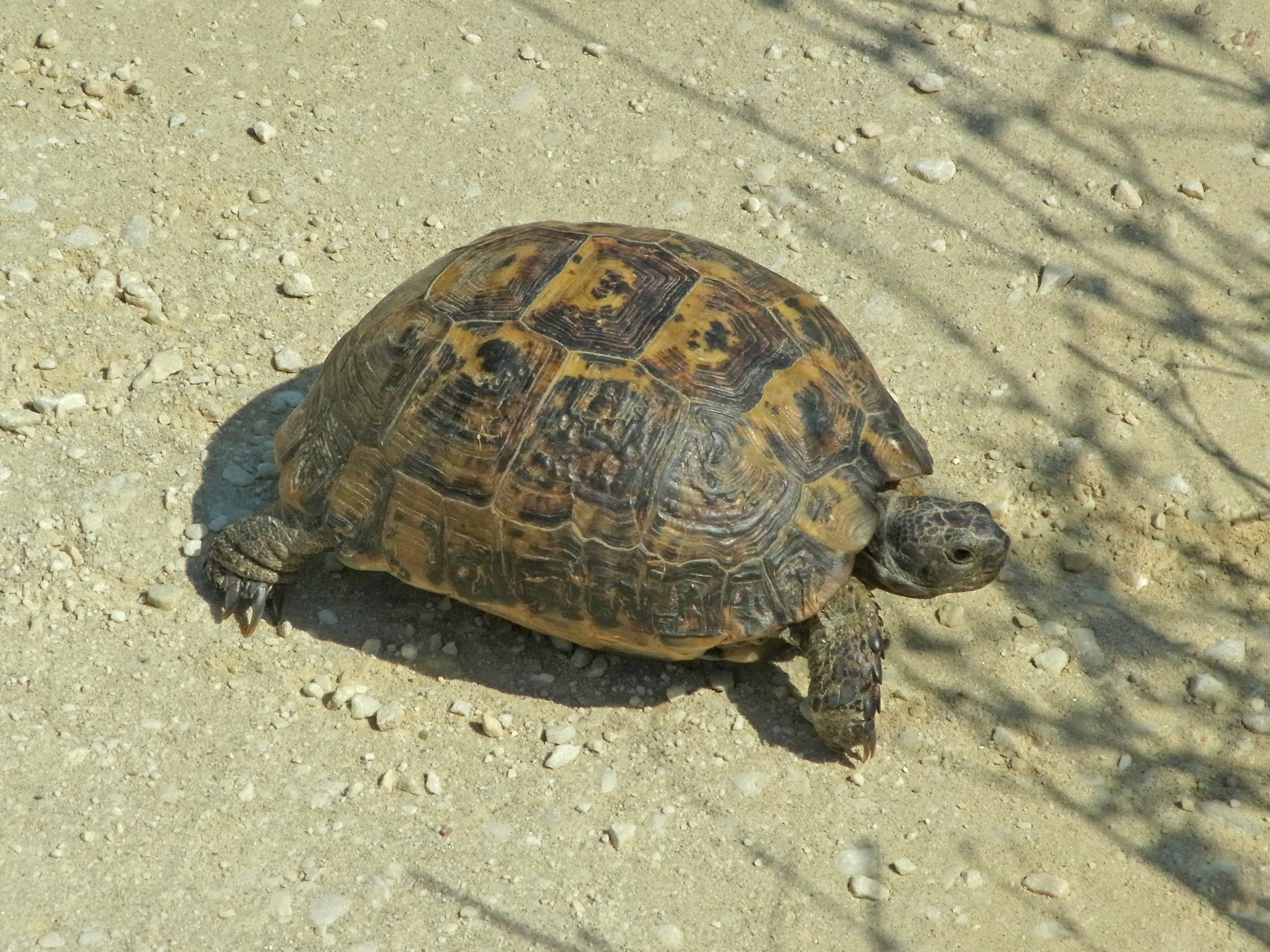
in Greece

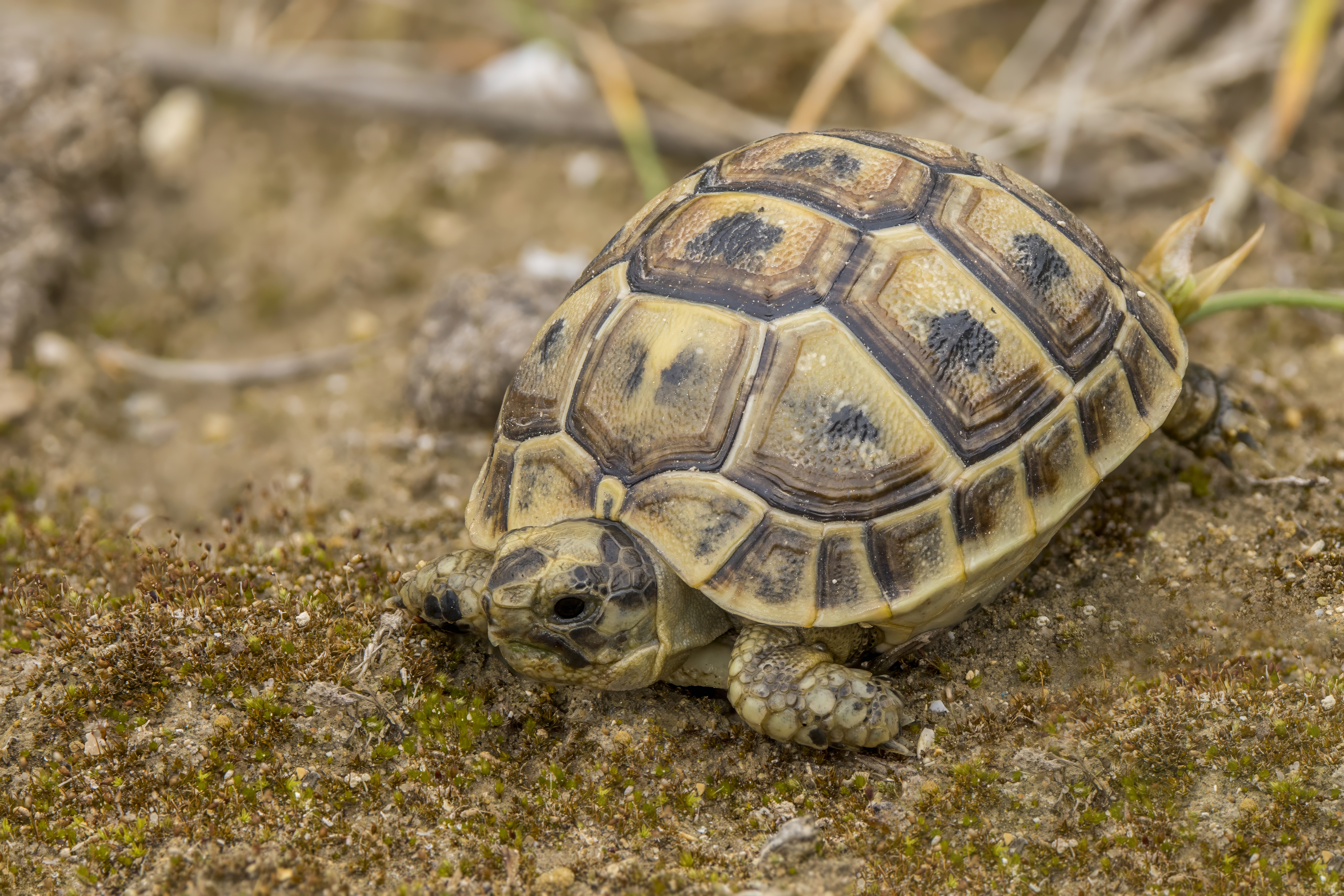
juvenile T. g. nabeulensis in Tunisia

== Sexing ==
Males of Testudo graeca exhibit several distinct physical characteristics that differentiate them from females. They are typically smaller in size and possess longer tails that taper evenly to a point. The male's cloacal opening is situated further from the base of the tail. On the plastron, or underside of the shell, males show a slight concavity, which aids in mounting during mating, whereas females have a flat plastron. Additionally, the posterior portion of a male's carapace is usually broader than its length, and the rear marginal scutes often curve outward.

== Behavior ==
=== Diet ===
In captivity, Greek tortoises (Testudo graeca) commonly consume a variety of leafy greens, with a particular preference for dandelion leaves and similar vegetation. While they may readily eat lettuce, it is generally not recommended as a staple food, because it lacks the essential nutrients required to support their long-term health and survival.

=== Brumation ===
Testudo graeca brumates during cold months, emerging as early as February in hot coastal areas. Individual tortoises may emerge on warm days even during winter.

=== Mating and reproduction ===
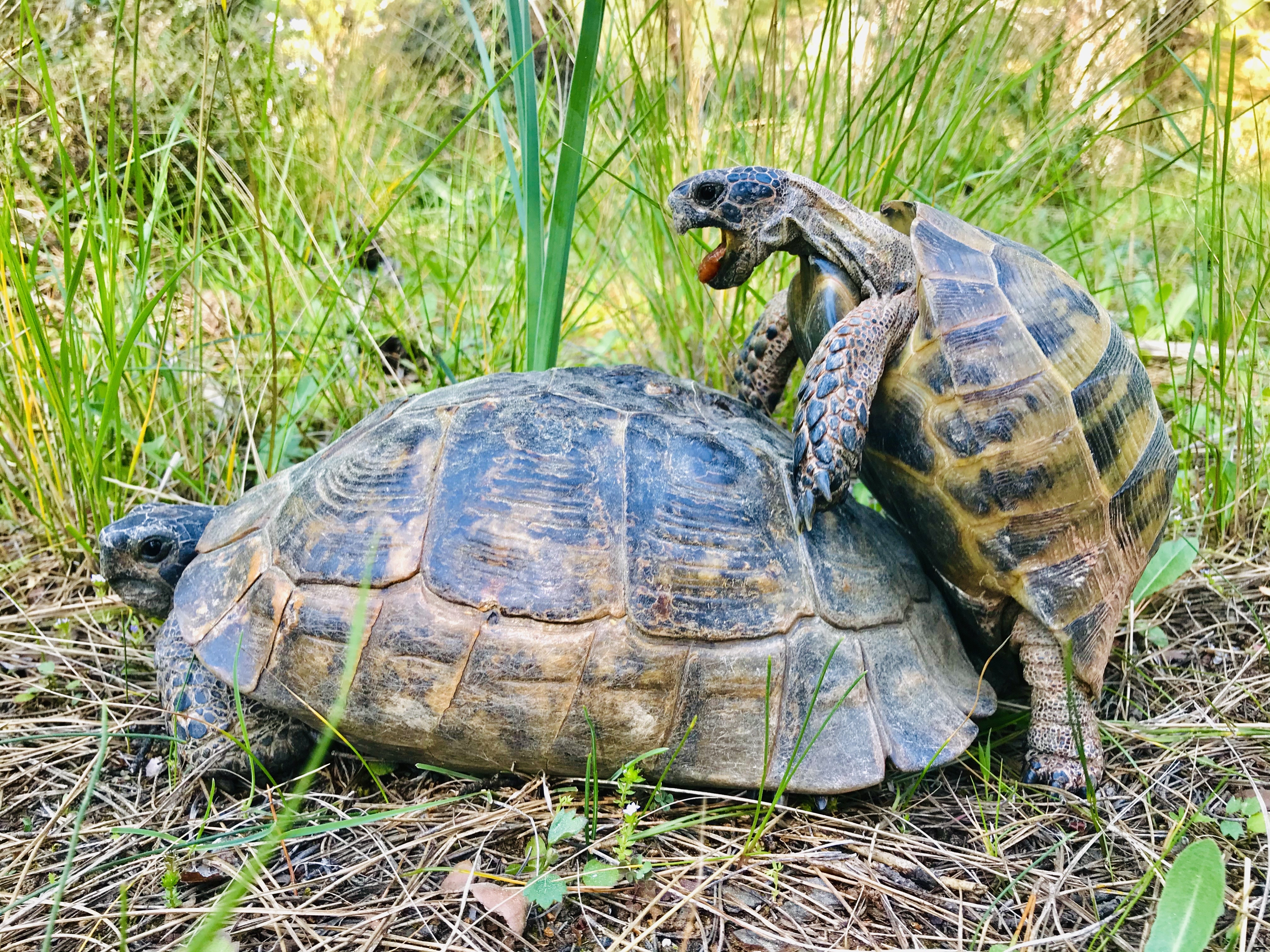
A pair of Testudo graeca mating in Mountain Yamanlar Nature Park, İzmir Province, Turkey

Reproductive behavior in T. graeca begins shortly after emerging from hibernation. Males actively pursue females, displaying courtship behaviors such as circling, biting at the limbs, ramming, and mounting attempts. During copulation, males emit squeaking sounds and display a red tongue by opening their mouths.

Females generally remain still during copulation, bracing with their front legs and moving rhythmically in response to the male's actions. A single successful mating can result in multiple clutches of eggs. In captivity, males and females are often kept separate to avoid aggression. If multiple males are housed together, dominant behavior may occur, including attempts to mount other males. An imbalanced male-to-female ratio can lead to serious aggression and injury.

Prior to oviposition, females become noticeably restless, engaging in behaviors such as sniffing and digging to locate suitable nesting sites. In the final days before laying, females may display dominant behavior, like mock mounting and vocalizations. This behavior may help establish social dominance and ensure minimal disturbance during egg laying. The specifics of oviposition resemble those observed in related species like the marginated tortoise.

== Trade ==
The Greek tortoise (Testudo graeca) is frequently traded as a pet, particularly in source countries such as Morocco and Spain, despite existing legal restrictions on the trade of wild-caught individuals.

This practice poses a conservation risk, as it may contribute to unsustainable removal of individuals from wild populations for both local sale and international export. Furthermore, concerns have been raised regarding the welfare conditions under which the tortoises are kept and transported, with reports of inadequate housing and care leading to high mortality rates in captivity.

== See also ==
- Mediterranean tortoise
- Timothy (tortoise)
- Jackson ratio
