= List of uropeltid species and subspecies =

This is a list of all extant genera, species and subspecies of the family Uropeltidae, otherwise referred to as uropeltids, shield-tail snakes, shield-tailed snakes or earth snakes. It follows the taxonomy currently provided by ITIS, which is based on the continuing work of Roy McDiarmid.

- Melanophidium
  - Melanophidium bilineatum, two-lined black shield-tail snake
  - Melanophidium khairei, Khaire's black shield-tail snake
  - Melanophidium punctatum, Beddome's black shield-tail snake
  - Melanophidium wynaudense, Indian black earth snake
- Platyplectrurus
  - Platyplectrurus madurensis, Travancore Hills thorntail snake
    - Platyplectrurus madurensis madurensis
    - Platyplectrurus madurensis ruhanae
  - Platyplectrurus trilineatus, tri-striped shield-tail snake
- Plectrurus
  - Plectrurus aureus, Kerala burrowing snake
  - Plectrurus guentheri, Günther's burrowing snake
  - Plectrurus perrotetii, Nilgiri burrowing snake
- Pseudoplectrurus
  - Pseudoplectrurus canaricus, Karnataka burrowing snake
- Rhinophis
  - Rhinophis blythii, Blyth's earth snake
  - Rhinophis dorsimaculatus, polka-dot earth snake
  - Rhinophis drummondhayi, Drummond-Hay's earth snake
  - Rhinophis fergusonianus, Cardamom Hills earth snake
  - Rhinophis homolepis, Trevelyan's earth snake
  - Rhinophis oxyrynchus, Schneider's earth snake
  - Rhinophis philippinus, Peter's earth snake
  - Rhinophis phillipsi, Phillips' earth snake
  - Rhinophis porrectus, Willey's earth snake
  - Rhinophis punctatus, Müller's earth snake
  - Rhinophis saffragamus, large shield-tail snake
  - Rhinophis sanguineus, salty earth snake
  - Rhinophis travancoricus, Travancore shield-tail snake
  - Rhinophis tricoloratus
  - Rhinophis zigzag, zigzag shield-tail snake
- Teretrurus
  - Teretrurus hewstoni
  - Teretrurus rhodogaster, Wall's shield-tail snake
  - Teretrurus sanguineus, purple-red earth snake
  - Teretrurus travancoricus, Travancore earth snake
- Uropeltis
  - Uropeltis arcticeps, Madurai shield-tail snake
  - Uropeltis beddomii, Beddom's earth snake
  - Uropeltis broughami, Brougham's earth snake
  - Uropeltis ceylanica, Cuvier's shield-tail snake
  - Uropeltis dindigalensis, Dindigul shield-tail snake
  - Uropeltis ellioti, Elliot's shield-tail snake
  - Uropeltis grandis, Smith's earth snake
  - Uropeltis liura, Ashambu shield-tail snake
  - Uropeltis macrolepis, Bombay earth snake
  - Uropeltis macrorhyncha, Anaimalai earth snake
  - Uropeltis maculata, spotted earth snake
  - Uropeltis melanogaster, Gray's earth snake
  - Uropeltis myhendrae, Boulenger's earth snake
  - Uropeltis nitida, southern earth snake
  - Uropeltis ocellata, ocellated earth snake
  - Uropeltis petersi, Peters' earth snake
  - Uropeltis phipsonii, Phipson's earth snake
  - Uropeltis pulneyensis, Indian earth snake
  - Uropeltis rubrolineata, red-lined earth snake
  - Uropeltis rubromaculata, red-spotted earth snake
  - Uropeltis ruhunae
  - Uropeltis woodmasoni, Wood-Mason's earth snake
