= List of snakes of South Asia =

The following is a list of snakes (suborder Serpentes) of South Asia, primarily covering the region covered by mainland India, Pakistan, Nepal, Sri Lanka, Bangladesh, Bhutan, parts of Myanmar and the Andaman and Nicobar Island chains. All families are covered except for the Colubridae which is found here. This forms part of the complete list of reptiles of South Asia. South Asia and India in particular have the highest number of snake species in the world.

== Family Leptotyphlopidae ==
- Myriopholis blanfordi
- Myriopholis hamulirostris

== Family Typhlopidae ==
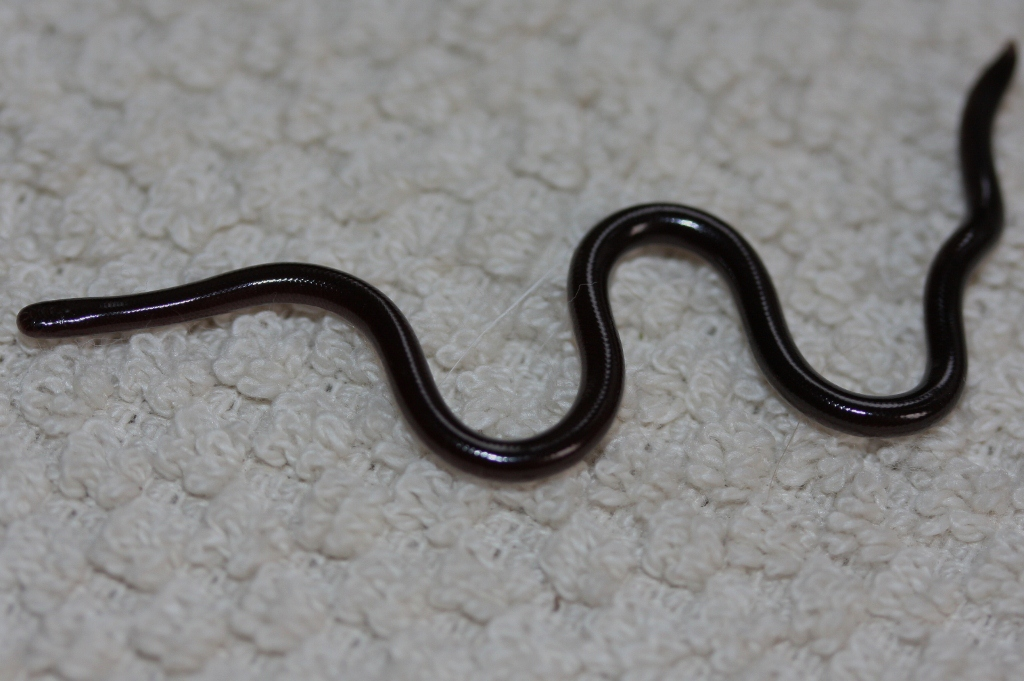
Common Blind Snake (Ramphotyphlops braminus)

- Brahminy Blind Snake (Ramphotyphlops braminus) Bangladesh, Bhutan, India, Nepal, Pakistan, Sri Lanka
- Slender blind snake (Typhlops porrectus) Pakistan, India, Bangladesh, Sri Lanka
- Giant blind snake (Typhlops diardii) Northeast India, Bangladesh, China, Indo-China, Myanmar, Thailand, Malay region
- Pied blind snake (Typhlops leucomelas) Sri Lanka
- Jan's blind snake (Typhlops mirus) Sri Lanka
- Günther's blind snake (Typhlops pammeces Günther 1864)
- Typhlops exiguus
- Typhlops beddomii
- Typhlops andamanesis
- Rhinotyphlops acutus
- Ramphotyphlops exocoeti
- (Typhlops tindalli)
- (Typhlops thurstoni)
- (Typhlops tenuicollis)
- (Typhlops oligolepis)
- (Typhlops oatesii)
- (Typhlops meszoelyi)
- (Typhlops loveridgei)
- (Typhlops jerdoni)
- (Typhlops fletcheri)

== Family Cylindrophiidae ==
- Sri Lankan pipe snake Cylindrophis maculatus Sri Lanka

== Family Uropeltidae ==
- Palni Shieldtail Snake Teretrurus rhodogaster
- Two-lined Black Shieldtail Melanophidium bilineatum
- Beddome's Black Shieldtail Melanophidium punctatum
- Indian Black Earth Snake Melanophidium wynaudense
- Travancore Hills Thorntail Snake Platyplectrurus madurensis
- Lined Thorntail Snake Platyplectrurus trilineatus
- Kerala Shieldtail Plectrurus aureus
- Günther's Burrowing Snake Plectrurus guentheri
- Nilgiri Burrowing Snake Plectrurus perroteti
- Karnataka burrowing snake Pseudoplectrurus canaricus
- Cardamom Hills Earth Snake Rhinophis fergusonianus
- Schneider's Earth Snake Rhinophis oxyrhynchus
- Salty Earth Snake Rhinophis sanguineus
- Travancore Shieldtail Rhinophis travancoricus
- Purple-red Earth Snake Teretrurus sanguineus
- Madurai Earth Snake Uropeltis arcticeps
- Beddome's Earth Snake Uropeltis beddomii
- Bhupathy's shieldtail Uropeltis bhupathyi
- Brougham's Earth Snake Uropeltis broughami
- Ceylon Earth Snake Uropeltis ceylanicus
- Sirumalai Hills Earth Snake Uropeltis dindigalensis
- Elliot's Earth Snake Uropeltis ellioti
- Smith's Earth Snake Uropeltis grandis
- Jerdon's shieldtail Uropeltis jerdoni
- Günther's Earth Snake Uropeltis liura
- Bombay Earth Snake Uropeltis macrolepis
- Anaimalai Earth Snake Uropeltis macrorhynchus
- Spotted Earth Snake Uropeltis maculatus
- Boulenger's Earth Snake Uropeltis myhendrae
- Southern Earth Snake Uropeltis nitidus
- Ocellated Shieldtail Uropeltis ocellatus
- Shieldtail Earth Snake Uropeltis petersi
- Phipson's Shieldtail Uropeltis phipsonii
- Indian Earth Snake Uropeltis pulneyensis
- Red-lined Earth Snake Uropeltis rubrolineatus
- Red-spotted Earth Snake Uropeltis rubromaculatus
- Woodmason's Earth Snake Uropeltis woodmasoni

== Family Acrochordidae ==
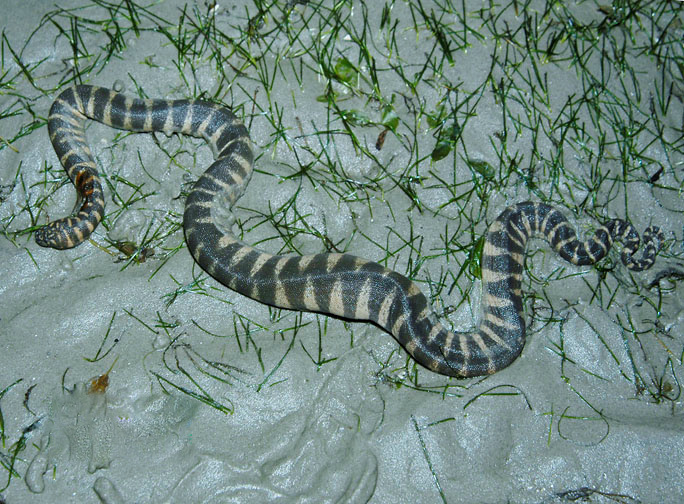
Wart snake (Acrochordus granulatus)

- Wart snake Acrochordus granulatus India, Sri Lanka, Philippines, Timor

== Family Boidae ==
- Common sand boa Eryx conicus Pakistan, India, Bangladesh, Sri Lanka
- Red sand boa Eryx johnii India, Pakistan
- Whitaker's sand boa Eryx whitakeri Southwest India

== Family Pythonidae ==
- Indian rock python Python molurus Pakistan, India, Nepal, Bhutan, Bangladesh, Sri Lanka, Myanmar
- Reticulated python Python reticulatus India (Arunachal Pradesh, Nicobars), Myanmar, China, Indo-China, Malay region, Indonesia, Philippines
- Burmese python Python bivittatus India, Nepal, Bhutan, Bangladesh, Myanmar, Thailand, Java, Sulawesi, China, Hong Kong, Indo-China

== Family Xenopeltidae ==
- Sunbeam snake Xenopeltis unicolor India (Nicobars), Myanmar, Thailand, China, Indo-China, Malay region

== Family Elapidae ==
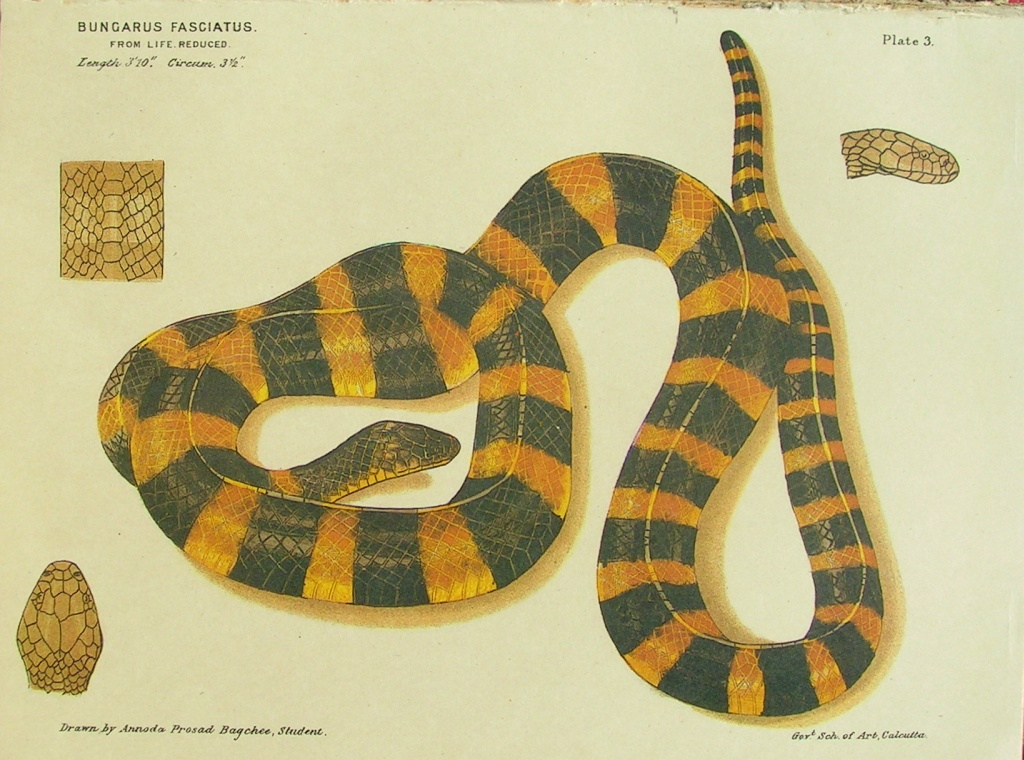
Bungarus fasciatus, the Banded Krait

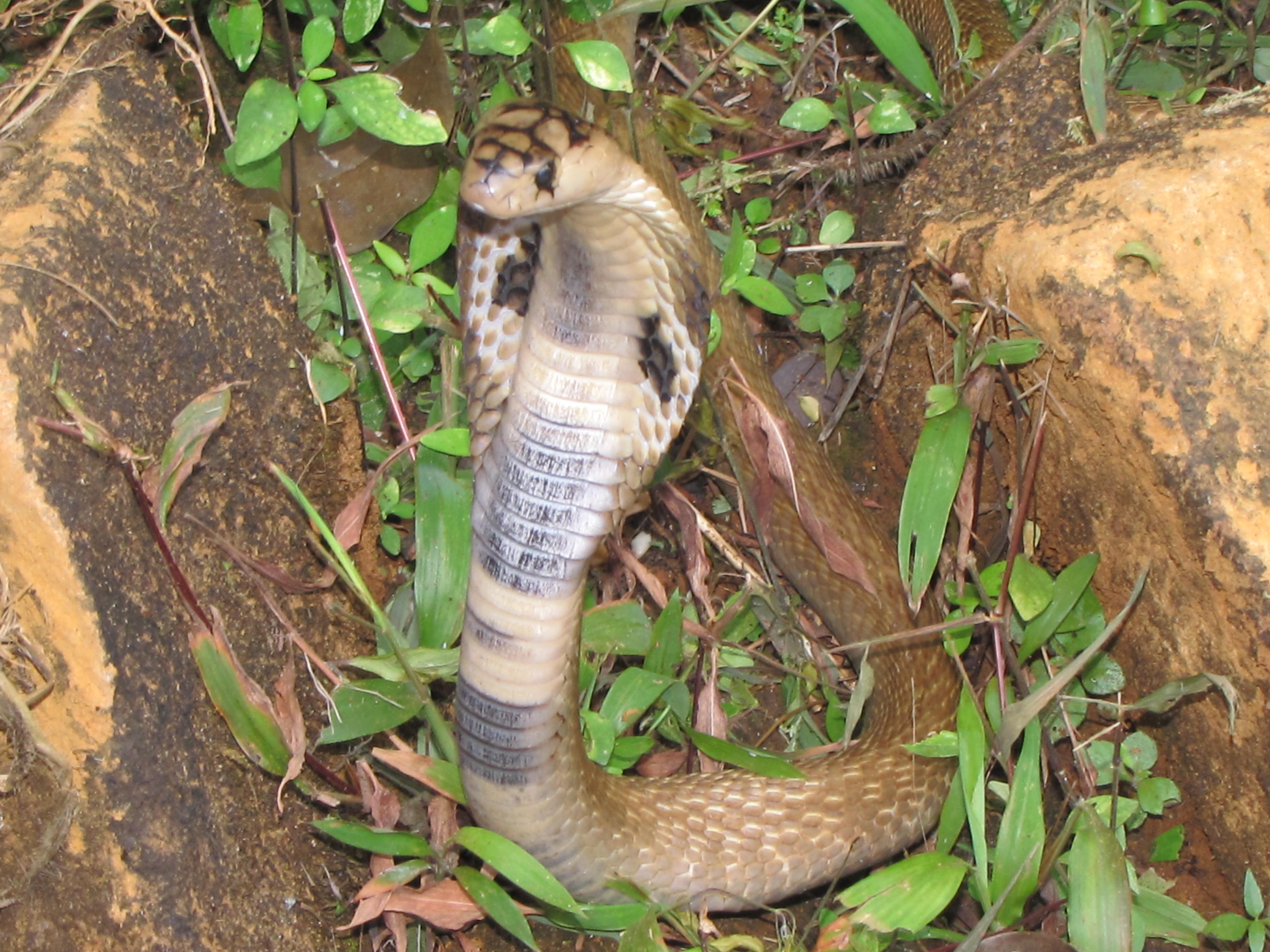
The Binocellate Cobra(naja naja)

- Andamans krait Bungarus andamanensis India (Andamans)
- Common Indian krait Bungarus caeruleus Pakistan, India, Nepal, Bangladesh, Sri Lanka
- Sri Lankan krait Bungarus ceylonicus Sri Lanka
- Banded krait Bungarus fasciatus Bangladesh, India, Nepal, Myanmar, Thailand, Indo-China, China, Malay region
- Sindh krait Bungarus sindanus Pakistan, India
- Northeastern Hill Krait Bungarus bungaroides
- Lesser Black Krait Bungarus lividus
- Greater Black Krait Bungarus niger
- Beddome's Coral Snake Calliophis beddomei
- MacClelland's coral snake Calliophis macclellandi Nepal, India, Myanmar, Indo-China, Taiwan
- Slender coral snake Calliophis melanurus Bangladesh, India, Sri Lanka
- Black Coral Snake Calliophis nigrescens
- Bibron's Coral Snake Calliophis bibroni
- Monocled cobra Naja kaouthia Bangladesh, India, Myanmar, Thailand, Indo-China, China
- Spectacled cobra Naja naja Pakistan, India, Nepal, Bangladesh, Sri Lanka
- Black cobra Naja oxiana Central Asia, Pakistan, India
- Andaman cobra Naja sagittifera India (Andamans)
- King cobra Ophiophagus hannah India, Nepal, Pakistan, Bangladesh, Myanmar, Thailand, China, Indo-China, Malay region, Philippines

== Family Hydrophiidae ==
- Spine-tailed seasnake Aipysurus eydouxii (Gray, 1849)
- Large-headed sea snake Astrotia stokesii (Gray, 1846) Pakistan, Sri Lanka, Malay region
- Olive-headed seasnake Disteira major (Shaw, 1802)
- Disteira nigrocincta (Daudin, 1803)
- Wall's sea snake Disteira walli Kharin, 1989
- Beaked seasnake or hook-nosed sea snake Enhydrina schistosa (Daudin, 1803) Persian Gulf, Pakistan, India, Sri Lanka, Bangladesh, Indo-China, Malay peninsula
- Faint-banded seasnake Hydrophis belcheri (Gray, 1849)
- Peters' sea snake Hydrophis bituberculatus Peters, 1872
- Hydrophis brooki Günther, 1872
- Blue sea snake Hydrophis caerulescens Shaw, 1802 Pakistan, India, Bangladesh, China, Malay region
- Annulated sea snake Hydrophis cyanocinctus Daudin, 1803
- Banded sea snake Hydrophis fasciatus (Schneider, 1799) Pakistan, India, Myanmar, Malay region
- Hydrophis inornatus (Gray, 1849)
- Kloss' sea snake Hydrophis klossi Boulenger, 1912
- Bombay sea snake Hydrophis mamillaris Pakistan, India, Sri Lanka
- Black-banded sea snake Hydrophis nigrocinctus India, Bangladesh, Sri Lanka, Myanmar
- Estuarine sea snake Hydrophis obscurus India, Bangladesh, Sri Lanka, Myanmar
- Cochin banded sea snake Hydrophis ornatus Persian Gulf, Pakistan, India, Bangladesh, Sri Lanka, Malay region, Indo-China, China
- Persian Gulf sea snake Hydrophis lapemoides (Gray, 1849)
- Slender-necked seasnake Hydrophis melanocephalus (Gray, 1849)
- Yellow sea snake Hydrophis spiralis (Shaw, 1802)
- Collared sea snake Hydrophis stricticollis Günther, 1864
- Jerdon's sea snake Kerilia jerdonii India, Sri Lanka, Malay peninsula
- Bighead sea snake Kolpophis annandalei (Laidlaw, 1901)
- Short sea snake Lapemis curtus (Shaw, 1802) Pakistan, India, Sri Lanka, Malay region, Indo-China
- Yellow-lipped sea krait Laticauda colubrina India, East of the islands of the Sundas
- Laticauda laticaudata (Linnaeus, 1758)
- Hardwicke's spine-bellied seasnake Lapemis hardwickii Gray, 1834
- Annulated sea snake Hydrophis cyanocinctus Persian Gulf, Pakistan, India, Sri Lanka, Bangladesh, Malay region
- Yellow sea snake Hydrophis spiralis Persian Gulf, Pakistan, India, Sri Lanka, Malay region
- Microcephalophis cantoris
- Slender narrow-headed sea snake Microcephalophis gracilis Pakistan, India, Sri Lanka, Bangladesh, Malay region, China
- Yellow-bellied sea snake Pelamis platurus
- Thalassophina viperina
- Anomalous sea snake Thalassophis anomalus

== Family Viperidae ==
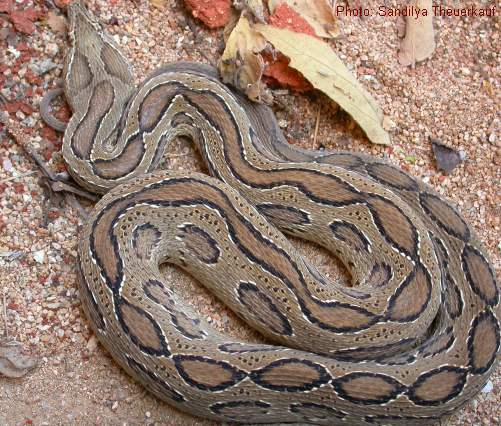
Russel's viper Daboia russelii

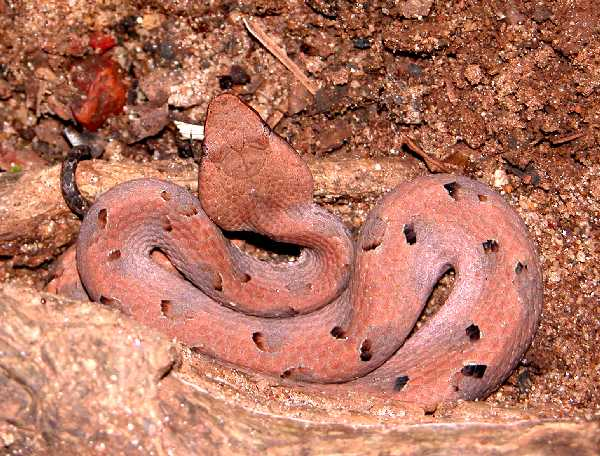
Common hump-nosed pit viper Hypnale hypnale

- Himalayan pit viper Gloydius himalayanus India, Pakistan, Nepal
- Levantine viper Macrovipera lebetinus Middle East, Pakistan
- Russel's viper Daboia russelii Pakistan, India, Bangladesh, Sri Lanka, Myanmar, Thailand, China, Indo-China, islands of Java, Komodo, Flores, Indonesia
- Indian saw-scaled viper Echis carinatus Pakistan, India, Nepal, Bangladesh, Sri Lanka
- Echis megalocephalus
- Common hump-nosed pit viper Hypnale hypnale India, Sri Lanka
- Millard's hump-nosed pit viper Hypnale nepa Sri Lanka
- Wall's hump-nosed pit viper Hypnale walli Sri Lanka
- Blotched pit viper Ovophis monticola Bangladesh, India, Nepal
- Brown spotted pit viper Protobothrops mucrosquamatus India, Bangladesh, China, Myanmar, Vietnam
- Protobothrops jerdonii
- White-lipped pit viper Trimeresurus albolabris India, Nepal, Bangladesh, China, Myanmar, Thailand, Sumatra, Java, Lesser Sundas up to Timor
- Anderson's pit viper Trimeresurus andersonii India (Andamans)
- Bamboo pit viper Trimeresurus gramineus Nepal, India
- Large-scaled green pit viper Trimeresurus macrolepis Southwest India
- Malabar rock pit viper Trimeresurus malabaricus Southwest India
- Tibetan pit viper Trimeresurus tibetanus Tibet, Nepal
- Trimeresurus stejnegeri
- Trimeresurus purpureomaculatus
- Pope's Pit Viper Trimeresurus popeiorum
- Medo Pit Viper Trimeresurus medoensis
- Trimeresurus labialis
- Trimeresurus erythrurus
- Cantor's Pit Viper Trimeresurus cantori
- Pseudocerastes persicus

== Family Colubridae ==
- Elachistodon westermanni

== See also ==
- Wildlife of India
- List of reptiles of South Asia
