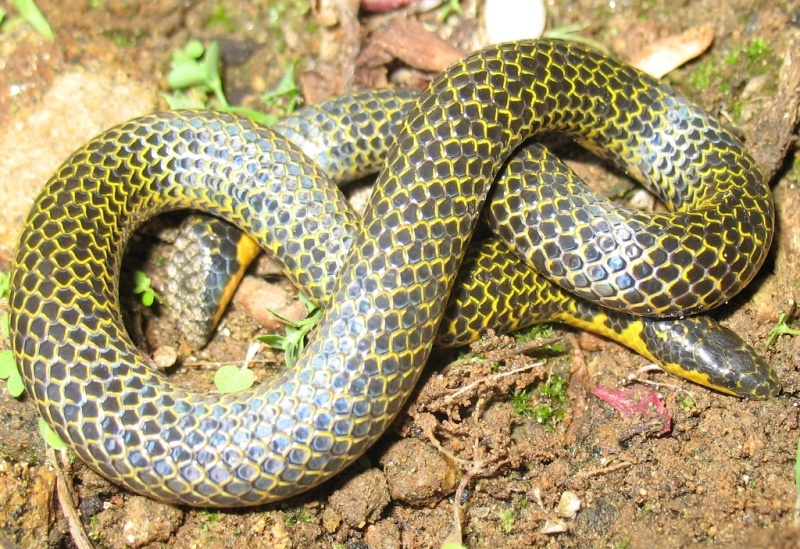

Conservation status
- Endangered (IUCN 3.1)

Scientific classification
- Kingdom: Animalia
- Phylum: Chordata
- Class: Reptilia
- Order: Squamata
- Suborder: Serpentes
- Family: Uropeltidae
- Genus: Uropeltis
- Species: U. madurensis

Binomial name
- Uropeltis madurensis (Beddome, 1878)

Synonyms
- Silybura madurensis Beddome, 1878; Uropeltis arcticeps madurensis — R. Whitaker & Captain, 2004; Uropeltis madurensis — Ganesh et al., 2014

= Uropeltis madurensis =

Species of reptile

Uropeltis madurensis, also known commonly as the Madura earth snake and the Madurai shieldtail, is an endangered species of small, fossorial, nonvenomous snake of the family Uropeltidae. The species is endemic to the Western Ghats of South India.

== Taxonomic notes ==
The species U. madurensis was formerly considered a subspecies of another species U. arcticeps, until a recent systematic revision revealed U. madurensis to be a distinct species.

== History ==
U. madurensis was first described by Richard Henry Beddome in 1878, when he collected the type specimen from the High Wavy Mountains or Meghamalai Hills.

== Etymology ==
The specific name, madurensis, refers to the geographic range of the species, which is near the prominent town of Madurai, in Tamil Nadu State, India.

== Identification ==
U. madurensis can be identified by the following combination of characters: tail shield with clearly defined, thickened, circumscribed disc; the part of the rostral visible from above not distinctly longer than its distance from the frontal; rostral not fully separating nasals; dorsum uniform brown, each scale with a well-defined lighter golden yellowish outline; ventrals 144–157; venter with alternate, rhomboidal, large, brown and orange spots or blotches, the two colours of equal intensities.

== Geographic range ==
U. madurensis is endemic to the Cardamom Hills consisting of Megamalai Wildlife Sanctuary and Grizzled Squirrel Wildlife Sanctuary in Tamil Nadu state and the Periyar Tiger Reserve of Kerala state, both in the Western Ghats.

== Habitat ==
A forest species, partial to montane forests, cloud forest and tropical rainforest, at altitudes of 1,300–1,600 m (4,300–5,200 ft), U. madurensis also occurs marginally in cardamom, coffee and tea plantations situated amidst primary forests.

== Behaviour ==
A fossorial, nocturnal snake, U. madurensis is known to hide under stones, fallen logs, and rocks during day time. Active during rains, in the monsoon season, especially after dark, it comes to the surface to forage.

== Diet ==
U. madurensis is believed to principally prey upon earthworms.

== Conservation status ==
U. madurensis is listed as "Endangered" by the IUCN. Habitat loss and roadkill are primary threats affecting this rare species.
