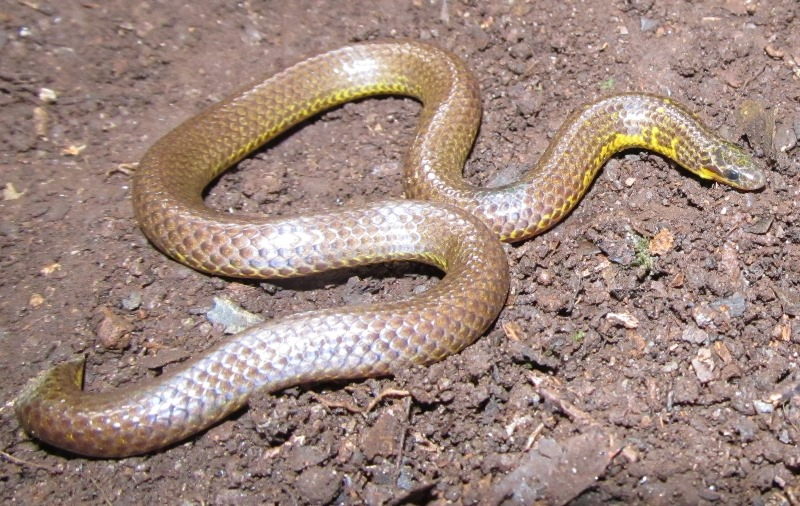

Scientific classification
- Kingdom: Animalia
- Phylum: Chordata
- Order: Squamata
- Suborder: Serpentes
- Family: Uropeltidae
- Genus: Uropeltis
- Species: U. rajendrani

Binomial name
- Uropeltis rajendrani Ganesh & Achyuthan, 2020

= Uropeltis rajendrani =

Species of snake

Uropeltis rajendrani, commonly known as the Rajendran's shieldtail, is a species of snake belonging to the family Uropeltidae. This recently described species is known only from a few hills in the southern Eastern Ghats, in Namakkal and the bordering Salem district of Tamil Nadu State in South India.

== Etymology ==
U. rajendrani is named in honour of Dr. Maria Viswasam Rajendran (2 November 1916–6 August 1993), "MVR" for short, for his exhaustive studies on shieldtail snakes in Tamil Nadu.

== Identification ==
U. rajendrani is a species of Uropeltis from the Kolli Hill complex, characterized by having the following combination of characters: (1) caudal shield truncate, with a distinct thickened circumscribed concave disc; (2) part of rostral visible from above not distinctly longer than its distance from frontal; (3) rostral scale partially separating nasal scales; (4) snout obtusely rounded; (5) eye diameter 3/4th that of ocular shield; (6) dorsal scale rows 16–17:16–17:15–16; (7) ventral scales 145–158; (8) subcaudal scales 8–11 pairs; (9) dorsum deep brown, unpatterned, anteriorly with a few yellow speckles; (10) venter yellow, each scale edged with brown.

== Behaviour and diet ==
U. rajendrani is a fossorial snake, that is mostly nocturnal, feeding presumably on soft-bodied worms.

== Geographic range ==
U. rajendran was described from the Bodha Malai hills near Panamarathupatti town. This species has previously been sighted from Semmedu, Solakkadu, Kuzhivalavu, Seekuparai, Thenur Nadu, Selur Nadu, Gundur Nadu settlements of Kolli Hills.

== Habitat ==
U. rajendrani inhabits moist forest floor and under the humus-rich top soil, in humid forests.
