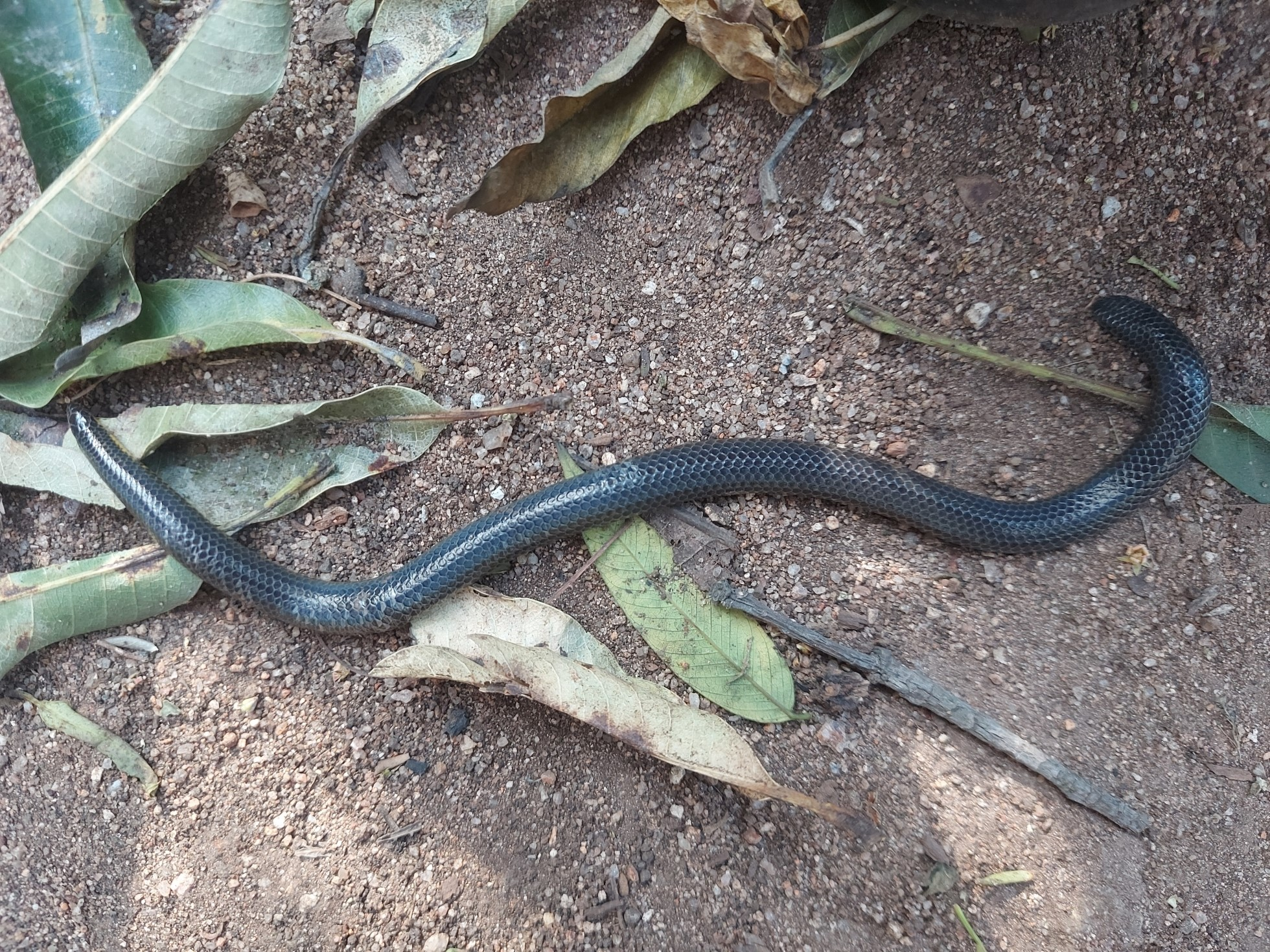

Scientific classification
- Kingdom: Animalia
- Phylum: Chordata
- Order: Squamata
- Suborder: Serpentes
- Family: Uropeltidae
- Genus: Uropeltis
- Species: U. jerdoni

Binomial name
- Uropeltis jerdoni Ganesh, Punith, Adhikari & Achyuthan, 2021

= Uropeltis jerdoni =

Species of snake

Uropeltis jerdoni, commonly known as Jerdon's shieldtail snake, is a species of snake in the family Uropeltidae. This recently described species is known from the Devarayanadurga hills, abutting the Bangalore suburbs in Bangalore Rural District and the bordering Tumkur district of Karnataka State in South India.

== Etymology ==
U. jerdoni is named in honour of Dr. Thomas Caverhill Jerdon (1811–1872), a pioneering English naturalist who worked extensively on Indian fauna. He described several reptiles from Bangalore, including the Mysore day gecko (Cnemaspis mysoriensis).

== Identification ==
A species of Uropeltis from the Bangalore uplands, U. jerdoni is characterized by having the following combination of characters: (1) a truncate and flattened caudal shield with a circumscribed concave disc; (2) the part of the rostral scale visible from above subequal to its distance from frontal scale; (3) the rostral partially separating the nasal scales; (4) 17: 17: 17 dorsal scale rows; (5) 140–148 ventral scales and 7–9 pairs of subcaudal scales; (6) dark blackish-grey above, powdered with minute yellow specks, yellow lateral stripes on neck and tail; ventrolateral region with yellow mottling; venter black.

== Behaviour and habitat ==
U. jerdoni is a fossorial and nocturnal species that feeds on earthworms. This species occurs in moist forest floor and under the humus-rich top soil, in hilly deciduous forest terrain.
