= Uropeltis myhendrae =

Conservation status
- Data Deficient (IUCN 3.1)

Scientific classification
- Kingdom: Animalia
- Phylum: Chordata
- Class: Reptilia
- Order: Squamata
- Suborder: Serpentes
- Family: Uropeltidae
- Genus: Uropeltis
- Species: U. myhendrae

Binomial name
- Uropeltis myhendrae (Beddome, 1886)

Synonyms
- Silybura nilghirriensis var. myhendræ Beddome, 1886; Silybura myhendræ — Boulenger, 1890; Uropeltis myhendrae — M.A. Smith, 1943

Species of snake

Uropeltis myhendrae, commonly known as Boulenger's earth snake, the Mahendragiri earth snake, and the Myhendra Mountain uropeltis, is a species of snake in the family Uropeltidae. The species is endemic to India.

== Geographic range ==
U. myhendrae is found in southern India, in the Western Ghats south of the Goa Gap, in the Indian states of Kerala, Tamil Nadu, and Travancore, at elevations of 2,000–4,000 ft (610–1,220 m).

Type locality: "South Travancore, on the Myhendra Mountain", southern India.

== Habitat ==
The preferred natural habitat of U. myhendrae is forest.

== Description ==
The dorsum of U. myhendrae is dark purplish brown, each scale with a yellowish crescent-shaped posterior border. There are three or four dark transverse blotches behind the head. The venter is yellowish, with small purplish brown spots in adults, but with large transverse blackish rhomboids in young.

Adults may attain 33.5 cm (13 1/4 in) in total length (including tail).

The dorsal scales are in 17 rows at midbody, in 19 rows behind the head. The ventrals number 139-153, and the subcaudals number 7-8.

The snout is obtuse. The rostral is ¼ to almost ⅓ the length of the shielded part of the head. The portion of the rostral visible from above is slightly longer than its distance from the frontal. The nasals are narrowly in contact with each other behind the rostral. The frontal is slightly longer than broad. The diameter of the eye is somewhat more than ½ the length of the ocular shield. The diameter of the body goes 25 to 32 times into the total length. The ventrals are two times as wide as the contiguous scales. The tail is obliquely truncate, flat dorsally, with strongly bicarinate or strongly tricarinate dorsal scales. The terminal scute has a transverse ridge, indistinctly bicuspid, rounded in the young.

== Behavior ==
U. myhendrae is terrestrial and fossorial.

== Reproduction ==
U. myhendrae is ovoviviparous.
