= Uropeltis rubrolineata =

Conservation status
- Least Concern (IUCN 3.1)

Scientific classification
- Kingdom: Animalia
- Phylum: Chordata
- Class: Reptilia
- Order: Squamata
- Suborder: Serpentes
- Family: Uropeltidae
- Genus: Uropeltis
- Species: U. rubrolineata

Binomial name
- Uropeltis rubrolineata (Günther, 1875)

Synonyms
- S[ilybura]. rubrolineata Günther, 1875; Silybura rubrolineata — Boulenger, 1893; Uropeltis rubrolineatus — M.A. Smith, 1943; Uropeltis (Siluboura) rubrolineatus — Mahendra, 1984; Uropeltis rubrolineata — Das, 1996

Species of snake

Common names: red-lined earth snake, red-lined shieldtail, Travancore uropeltis.

Uropeltis rubrolineata is a species of nonvenomous shieldtail snake in the family Uropeltidae. The species is endemic to southern India. There are no subspecies that are recognized as being valid.

== Geographic range ==
U. rubrolineata is found in southern India in the Western Ghats: south of the Palghat to Bhimshankar and in the Anaimalai and Travancore Hills.

The original type locality given is "Anamallays, Tinnevellys." Changed to "Tinnevellys, Travancore Hills" by lectotype designation.

== Habitat ==
The preferred natural habitat of U. rubrolineata is forest, at altitudes of 400–1,500 m (1,300–4,900 ft), but it has also been found in coconut plantations.

== Description ==
U. rubrolineata is blackish brown, both dorsally and ventrally. It has a bright red stripe along each side, usually about 2½ scales rows wide, beginning on the labials (both upper and lower).

Adults may attain a total length of 40 cm (15 3/4 in).

The dorsal scales are smooth, arranged in 17 rows at midbody, in 19 rows behind the head. The ventrals number 165–172, and the subcaudals number 6–8.

The snout is obtusely pointed. The rostral is about ¼ the length of the shielded part of the head. The portion of the rostral visible from above is as long as its distance from the frontal. The nasals are broadly in contact with each other behind the rostral. The frontal is as long as broad or slightly longer than broad. The eye is small, its diameter slightly less than half the length of the ocular shield. The diameter of the body goes 30 to 33 times into the total length. The ventrals are twice as broad as the contiguous scales. The end of tail is flat dorsally, obliquely truncate, with strongly bicarinate or tricarinate dorsal scales. The terminal scute has a transverse ridge, but no points.

== Behaviour ==
U. rubrolineata is terrestrial and fossorial.
