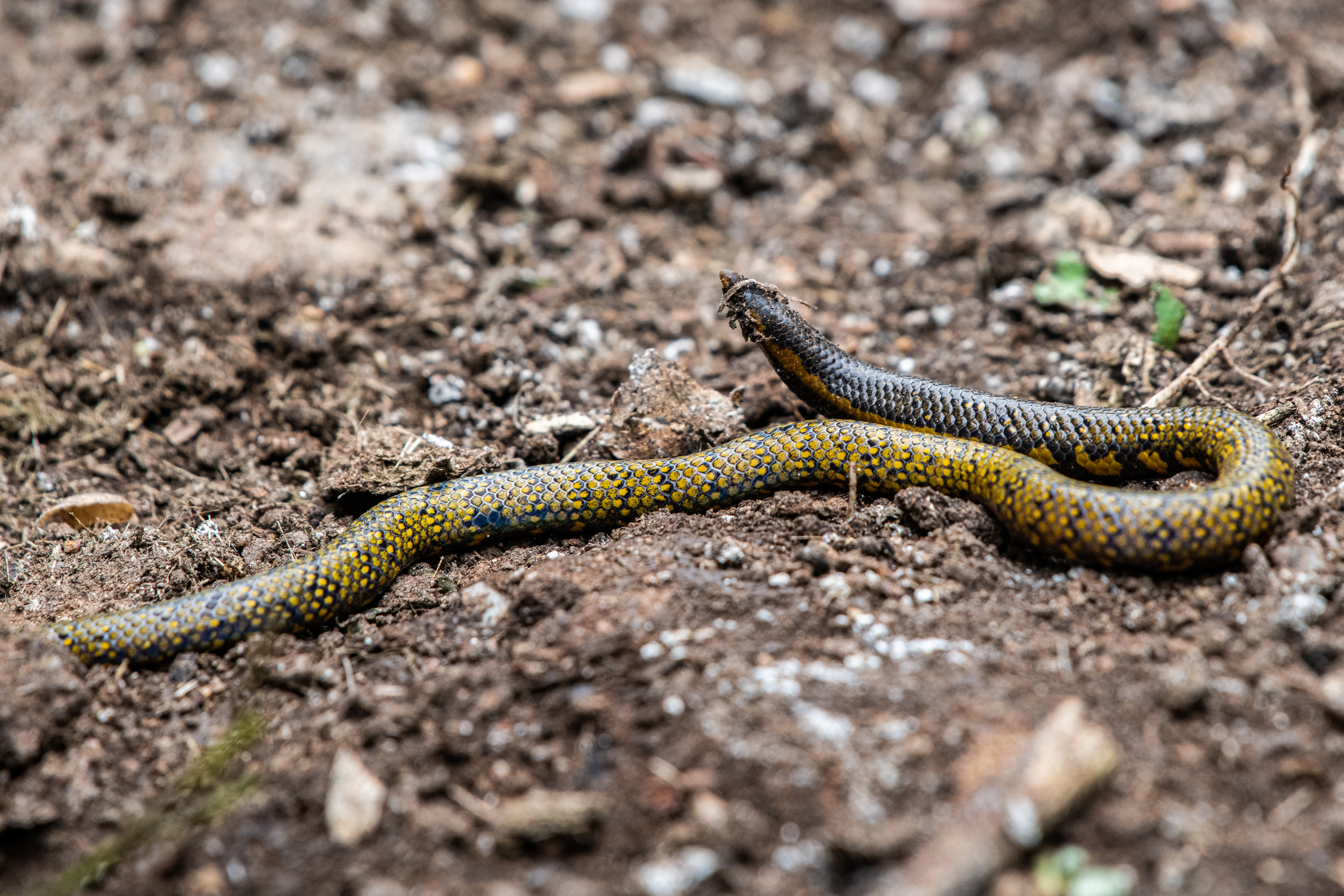

Conservation status
- Least Concern (IUCN 3.1)

Scientific classification
- Kingdom: Animalia
- Phylum: Chordata
- Class: Reptilia
- Order: Squamata
- Suborder: Serpentes
- Family: Uropeltidae
- Genus: Uropeltis
- Species: U. woodmasoni

Binomial name
- Uropeltis woodmasoni (W. Theobald, 1876)

Synonyms
- Silybura melanogaster Günther, 1875 (non Uropeltis melanogaster Gray, 1858); Silybura Wood-Masoni Theobald, 1876; Silybura nigra Beddome, 1878; Silybura nigra — Boulenger, 1893; Uropeltis wood-masoni — M.A. Smith, 1943; Uropeltis woodmasoni — Gans, 1966

= Uropeltis woodmasoni =

Species of snake

Uropeltis woodmasoni, commonly known as Wood-Mason's earth snake or Woodmason's earth snake, is a species of snake in the family Uropeltidae. The species is endemic to India.

== Etymology ==
The specific name, woodmasoni, is in honor of English zoologist James Wood-Mason.

== Geographic range ==
U. woodmasoni is found in southern India (Anamalai Hills and Palni Hills, Travancore, Tinnevelly, Nilgiris).

Type locality: "Anamallys and Travancore". (Silybura melanogaster Günther)

Type locality: "Palney hills, S India". (Silybura Wood-Masoni Theobald)

Type locality: "Pulney Mountains, 4,000 feet elevation". (Silybura nigra Beddome)

== Habitat ==
The preferred natural habitat of U. woodmasoni is forest, at altitudes of 1,800–2,000 m (5,900–6,600 ft).

== Description ==
The dorsum of U. woodmasoni is blackish or dark violet, with a transverse series of small round yellow spots or ocelli. There is a lateral series of large yellow spots which may be confluent into a stripe. The venter is blackish or dark violet.

Adults may attain a total length (including tail) of 28 cm (11 inches).

The smooth dorsal scales are arranged in 19 rows at midbody, as well as behind the head. The ventrals number 163-178; the subcaudals number 6-11.

The snout is pointed. The portion of the rostral visible from above is longer than its distance from the frontal, in some specimens separating the nasals. The frontal is slightly longer than broad. The eye is small, its diameter slightly less than ½ the length of the ocular shield. The diameter of the body goes 23 to 30 times into the total length. The ventrals are about twice as large as the contiguous scales. The tail is rounded, and the dorsal scales of the tail are strongly pluricarinate. The terminal scute has two small points.

== Reproduction ==
U. woodmasoni is viviparous.

== Taxonomy ==
The scientific name Silybura melanogaster Günther is unavailable because it is a homonym of Uropeltis melanogaster Gray. Therefore, the specific name, melanogaster, was replaced with the next available specific name, woodmasoni, by Gans in 1966.
