= Uropeltis dindigalensis =

Conservation status
- Data Deficient (IUCN 3.1)

Scientific classification
- Kingdom: Animalia
- Phylum: Chordata
- Class: Reptilia
- Order: Squamata
- Suborder: Serpentes
- Family: Uropeltidae
- Genus: Uropeltis
- Species: U. dindigalensis

Binomial name
- Uropeltis dindigalensis (Beddome, 1877)

Synonyms
- Silybura dindigalensis Beddome, 1877; Uropeltis dindigalensis — M.A. Smith, 1943

Species of snake

Uropeltis dindigalensis, commonly known as the Dindigul uropeltis and the Sirumalai Hills earth snake, is a species of snake in the family Uropeltidae. The species is endemic to Sirumalai and surrounding hill ranges of the southern Eastern Ghats, in Dindigul district of Tamil Nadu state in South India.

== Geographic range and habitat ==
U. dindigalensis is found only in Sirumalai, a part of the southern Eastern Ghats in Dindigul district of Tamil Nadu in South India. It occurs in high-elevation wet forests, over 900 m (3,000 ft) above sea level. It is also sometimes met with in coffee and mixed fruit orchards and plantations in this region.

Type locality = "Heavy forest on the Sirumullay hills, near Dindigul, at 4000–5000 feet elevation".

== Description ==
The dorsum of U. dindigalensis is yellowish with small dark brown spots, the yellow scales dark-edged. There is a yellow streak on the labials, continuing along each side of the neck. The venter is dark brown with yellow spots or yellow short crossbars. The ventral surface of the tail is yellow.

The largest of the type specimens is 35.5 cm (14 inches) in total length (including tail).

The dorsal scales are in 19 rows behind the head, in 17 rows at midbody. The ventrals number 156–168; the subcaudals number 5–10.

The snout is acutely pointed. The rostral is laterally compressed, about two fifths the length of the shielded part of the head, the portion visible from above much longer than its distance from the frontal. The nasals are in contact with each other behind the rostral. The frontal is longer than broad. The eye is very small, not half the length of the ocular shield. The diameter of the body goes 26 to 32 times into the total length. The ventrals are twice as broad as the contiguous scales. The tail is obliquely truncate, flat dorsally, with strongly pluricarinate scales. The terminal scute has a transverse ridge and two points.

== Habits ==
A poorly-known snake, U. dindigalensis is not often documented in scientific studies due to its very small geographic range. A fossorial, nocturnal, slow-moving snake, it is known to feed on earthworms.
