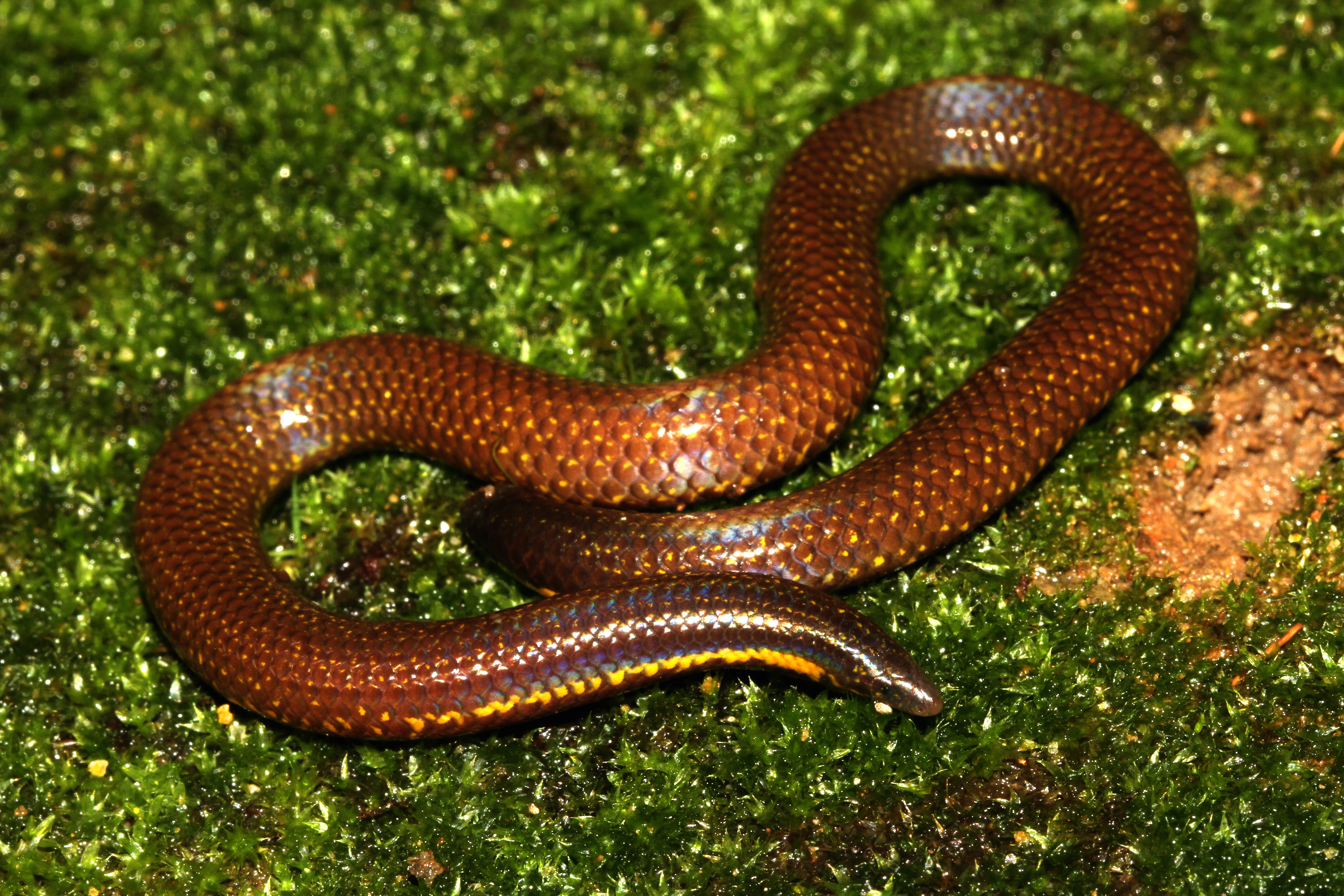

Conservation status
- Least Concern (IUCN 3.1)

Scientific classification
- Kingdom: Animalia
- Phylum: Chordata
- Class: Reptilia
- Order: Squamata
- Suborder: Serpentes
- Family: Uropeltidae
- Genus: Uropeltis
- Species: U. ellioti

Binomial name
- Uropeltis ellioti (Gray, 1858)

Synonyms
- Siloboura ellioti Gray, 1858; Silybura ellioti — Günther, 1864; Silybura punctata Günther, 1875; Silybura ellioti — Boulenger, 1893; Uropeltis ellioti — M.A. Smith, 1943

= Uropeltis ellioti =

Species of snake

Uropeltis ellioti, commonly known as Elliot's earth snake and Elliot's shieldtail, is a species of snake in the family Uropeltidae. The species is endemic to India.

== Etymology ==
The specific name or epithet, ellioti, is in honor of Scottish naturalist Walter Elliot.

== Geographic range ==
U. ellioti is found in southern India (Hills of Peninsular India. Western Ghats south of the Goa Gap to Tinnevelly. Eastern Ghats: Shevaroys, Coimbatore district, South Arcot, Jalarpet, Vizagapatam district, Ganjam).

Type locality of Siloboura ellioti = "Madras".

Type locality of Silybura punctata = "Pulney hills, Golcondah hills".

== Habitat ==
The preferred natural habitat of U. ellioti is forest, at altitudes of 100–1,400 m (330–4,590 ft).

== Description ==
The dorsum of U. ellioti is dark brown, either uniform or with yellow dots. There is a yellow stripe on each side of the neck, and a yellow stripe on each side of the tail. The venter is dark brown with small yellow dots, and there is a yellow transverse bar across the vent, which connects the stripes on the sides of the tail.

Adults may attain a total length (including tail) of 24 cm (9 1/2 in).

The dorsal scales are in 19 rows behind the head, in 17 rows at midbody. The ventrals number 144–172; and the subcaudals number 6-10.

The snout is pointed. The rostral is about ⅓ the length of the shielded part of the head, the portion visible from above longer than its distance from the frontal. The nasals are in contact with each other behind the rostral. The eye is very small, less than half the length of the ocular shield. The diameter of the body goes 25 to 32 times in the total length. The ventrals are nearly twice as large as the contiguous scales. The end of the tail is convex or somewhat flattened dorsally. The dorsal scales of the tail have 3 to 6 strong keels. The terminal scute has a transverse ridge and two points.

== Behavior ==
U. ellioti is terrestrial and fossorial.

== Diet ==
U. ellioti preys upon earthworms.

== Reproduction ==
U. ellioti is ovoviviparous.
