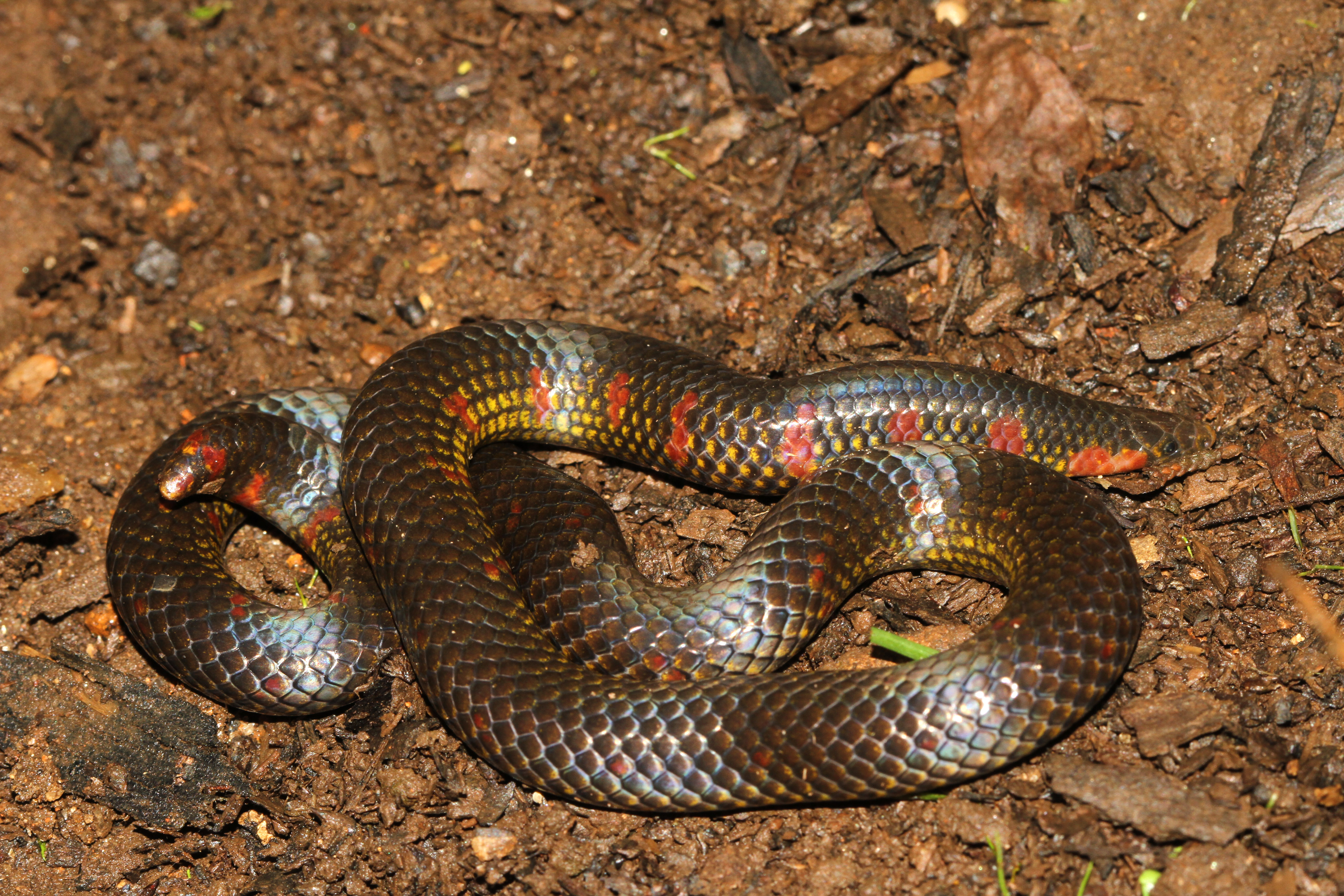

Conservation status
- Data Deficient (IUCN 3.1)

Scientific classification
- Kingdom: Animalia
- Phylum: Chordata
- Class: Reptilia
- Order: Squamata
- Suborder: Serpentes
- Family: Uropeltidae
- Genus: Uropeltis
- Species: U. maculata

Binomial name
- Uropeltis maculata (Beddome, 1878)

Synonyms
- Silybura maculata Beddome, 1878; Silybura maculata — Boulenger, 1893; Uropeltis maculatus — M.A. Smith, 1943; Uropeltis (Crealia) maculatus — Mahendra, 1984; Uropeltis maculata — Das, 1996

= Uropeltis maculata =

Species of snake found in India

Uropeltis maculata, commonly known as the spotted earth snake and spotted shieldtail, is a species of nonvenomous snake in the family Uropeltidae. The species is endemic to southern India.

== Distribution and habitat ==
U. maculata is found in southern India in the Western Ghats: Anaimalai Hills and southern Kerala.

No type locality was given in the original description. Beddome (1886) gives "Anaimalai, higher ranges 6,000–7,000 ft (1,800–2,100 m) elevation.

The preferred natural habitats of U. maculata are forest and grassland, but it has also been found in agricultural plantations.

== Description ==
U. maculata is dark brown or black both dorsally and ventrally, with several deep red blotches on the sides anteriorly, rarely along the full length of the body. It has similar deep red blotches about the tail.

Adults may attain a total length (including tail) of 38 cm (15 inches).

The dorsal scales are arranged in 17 rows at midbody (in 19 rows behind the head). The ventrals number 152–173, and the subcaudals number 8-13.

The snout is obtuse. The rostral is about 1/4 the length of the shielded part of the head. The portion of the rostral visible from above is as long as its distance from the frontal. The nasals are in contact with each other behind the rostral. The frontal is longer than broad. The eye is small, its diameter less than 1/2 the length of the ocular shield. The diameter of the body goes 27 to 40 times into the total length. The tail is rounded or slightly laterally compressed. The caudal dorsal scales are smooth, or a few of the terminal ones are faintly keeled. The terminal scute is very small, with two points.

== Reproduction ==
U. maculata is ovoviviparous.
