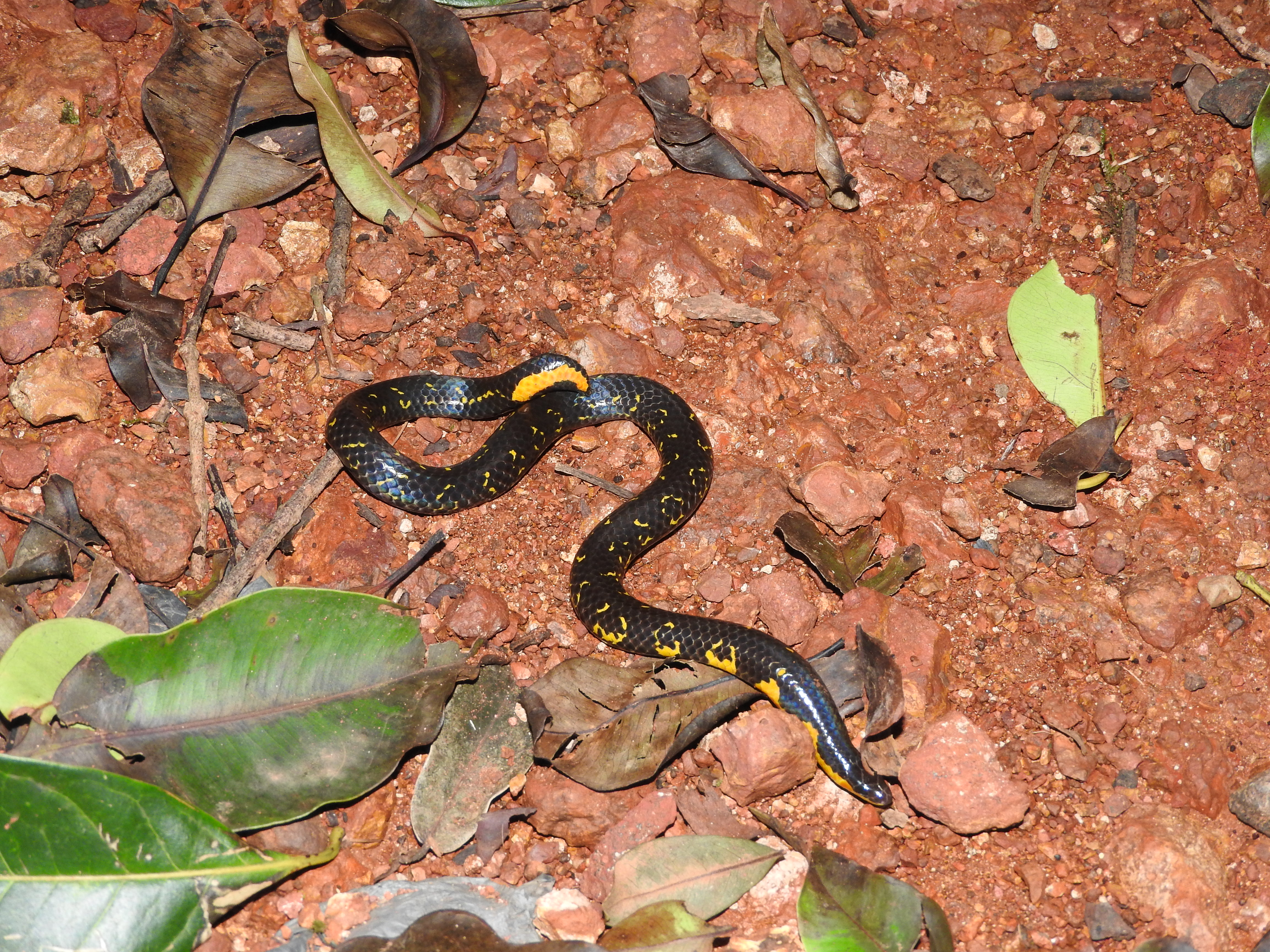

Conservation status
- Least Concern (IUCN 3.1)

Scientific classification
- Kingdom: Animalia
- Phylum: Chordata
- Class: Reptilia
- Order: Squamata
- Suborder: Serpentes
- Family: Uropeltidae
- Genus: Uropeltis
- Species: U. macrolepis

Binomial name
- Uropeltis macrolepis (W. Peters, 1862)

Synonyms
- Silybura macrolepis W. Peters, 1862; Uropeltis macrolepis — M.A. Smith, 1943

= Uropeltis macrolepis =

Species of snake

Uropeltis macrolepis, commonly known as the Bombay earth snake, the Bombay shieldtail, or the large-scaled shieldtail, is a species of snake in the family Uropeltidae. The species is endemic to southern India. There are two recognized subspecies.

== Geographic range ==
Uropeltis macrolepis is found in Maharashtra (Phansad – near Supegaon, Mahabaleshwar, Koyna, Lonavla), India.

Type locality of Uropeltis macrolepis mableshwarensis is "Mahableshwar, Satara district, Bombay State", India.

== Habitat ==
The preferred natural habitat of U. macrolepis is forest, at altitudes of 10–1,350 m (33–4,429 ft).

== Description ==
Uropeltis macrolepis is black or dark purplish brown both dorsally and ventrally, with each scale lighter-edged. There is a yellow stripe on the lips and sides of the neck, followed by two to five large yellow spots, and a yellow stripe along each side of the tail.

Adults may attain a total length (including tail) of 29.5 cm (11 1/2 in).

The smooth dorsal scales are in only 15 rows at midbody (in 17 rows behind the head). The ventrals number 128–140, and the subcaudals number 7–9.

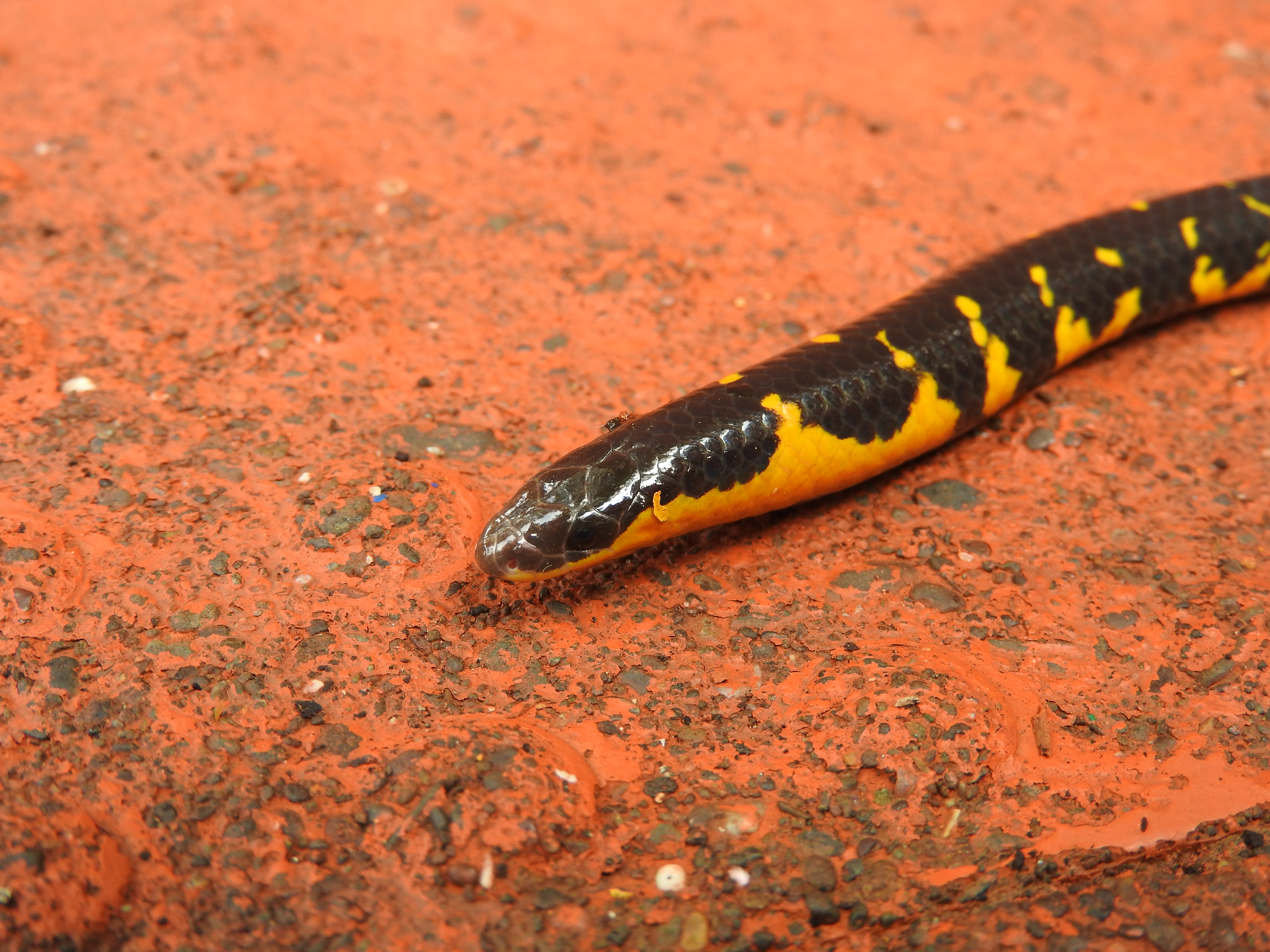
Closeup of Uropeltis macrolepis

The snout is rounded. The rostral is less than ¼ of the length of the shielded part of the head, the portion visible from above shorter than its distance from the frontal. The nasals are in contact with each other behind the rostral. The frontal is as long as or slightly longer than broad. The diameter of eye is more than ½ the length of the ocular shield. The diameter of body goes 24 to 29 times into the total length. The ventrals are twice as large as the contiguous scales. The end of the tail is obliquely truncate, flat dorsally, with strongly bicarinate scales. The terminal scale has a transverse ridge and two points.

== Behavior ==
Uropeltis macrolepis is terrestrial and fossorial.

== Diet ==
Uropeltis macrolepis preys upon earthworms.

== Reproduction ==
Uropeltis macrolepis is ovoviviparous.

== Subspecies ==
Two subspecies are recognized as being valid, including the nominate race.

- Uropeltis macrolepis macrolepis (W. Peters, 1862)
- Uropeltis macrolepis mahableshwarensis Chari, 1955
