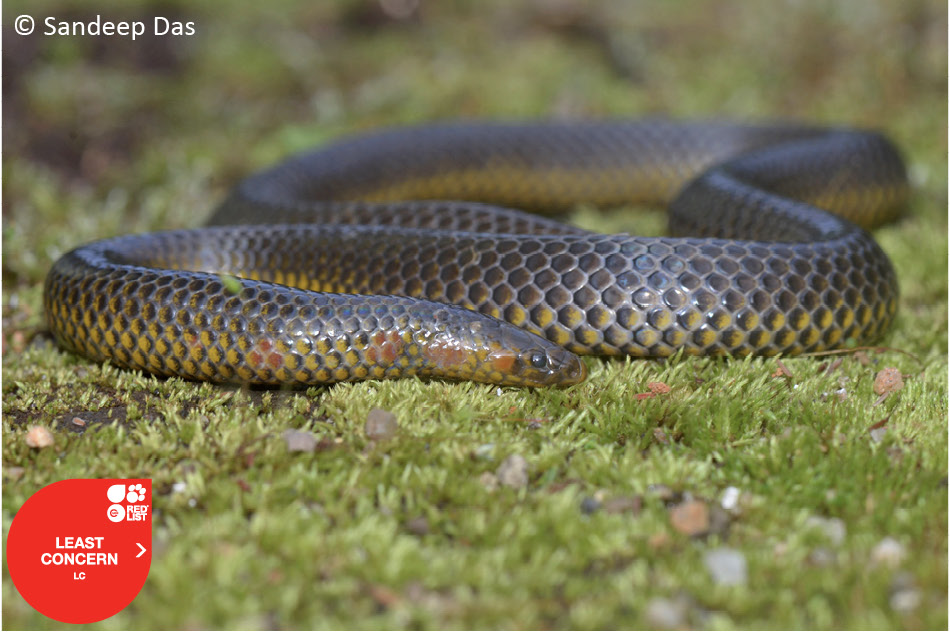

Conservation status
- Least Concern (IUCN 3.1)

Scientific classification
- Kingdom: Animalia
- Phylum: Chordata
- Class: Reptilia
- Order: Squamata
- Suborder: Serpentes
- Family: Uropeltidae
- Genus: Uropeltis
- Species: U. rubromaculata

Binomial name
- Uropeltis rubromaculata (Beddome, 1867)

Synonyms
- Silybura rubro-maculata Beddome, 1867; Silybura rubromaculata — Beddome, 1886; Silybura rubromaculata — Boulenger, 1893; Uropeltis rubromaculatus — M.A. Smith, 1943; Uropeltis (Siluboura) rubromaculatus — Mahendra, 1984; Uropeltis rubromaculata — Das, 1996

= Uropeltis rubromaculata =

Species of snake

Common names: red-spotted earth snake.

Uropeltis rubromaculata is a species of nonvenomous shieldtail snake in the family Uropeltidae. The species is endemic to southern India. There are no subspecies that are recognized as being valid.

== Geographic range ==
U. rubromaculata is found in southern India in the Western Ghats in the Anaimalai Hills and Nilgiri Hills between 1,200 and 1,500 m (3,900 and 4,900 ft) elevation.

The type locality given is "Anamallay forests; 4,000 feet elevation" (1,200 m).

== Habitat ==
The preferred natural habitat of U. rubromaculata is forest, at altitudes of 600–1,800 m (2,000–5,900 ft), but it has also been found in disturbed and artificial habitats such as plantations, manure piles, and drains.

== Description ==
The dorsum of U. rubromaculata is olive-brown. There are some red blotches on each side of the anterior portion of the body, and one red blotch on each side of the tail near the vent. The venter is variegated with yellow and red.

Adults may attain 34 cm (13 3/8 in) in total length (including tail).

The dorsal scales are arranged in 17 rows at midbody, in 19 rows behind the head. The ventrals number 127–136, and the subcaudals number 8–10.

The snout is obtuse. The rostral is slightly more than ¼ the length of the shielded part of the head. The portion of the rostral visible from above is as long as its distance from the frontal. The nasals are in contact with each other behind the rostral. The frontal is slightly longer than broad. The diameter of the eye is ½ or slightly more than ½ the length of the ocular shield. The diameter of body goes 25 to 33 times into the total length. The ventrals are two times as broad as the contiguous scales. The end of the tail is flat dorsally, obliquely truncate, with strongly bicarinate or tricarinate scales. The terminal scute has a transverse ridge and two points.

== Behaviour ==
U. rubromaculata is terrestrial and fossorial.

== Reproduction ==
U. rubromaculata is ovoviviparous.
