= Uropeltis petersi =

Conservation status
- Data Deficient (IUCN 3.1)

Scientific classification
- Kingdom: Animalia
- Phylum: Chordata
- Class: Reptilia
- Order: Squamata
- Suborder: Serpentes
- Family: Uropeltidae
- Genus: Uropeltis
- Species: U. petersi

Binomial name
- Uropeltis petersi (Beddome, 1878)

Synonyms
- Silybura petersi Beddome, 1878; Uropeltis petersi — M.A. Smith, 1943

Species of snake

Uropeltis petersi, commonly known as Peter's earth snake, Peters' shieldtail, and the shieldtail earth snake, is a species of nonvenomous snake in the family Uropeltidae. The species is endemic to India.

== Etymology ==
The specific name, petersi, is in honor of German herpetologist Wilhelm Peters (1815–1883).

== Geographic range ==
U. petersi is found in southern India in the Anaimalai Hills, at elevations of 4,000–5,000 ft (1,200–1,500 m).

Type locality: "Anamallays, 4000 feet".

== Habitat ==
The preferred natural habitat of U. petersi is forest.

== Description ==
The dorsum of U. petersi is uniformly brown, or brown with yellowish dots. The venter has irregular yellowish spots.

It may attain a total length (including tail) of 19 cm (7 1/2 in).

The smooth dorsals are arranged in 17 rows at midbody, in 19 rows behind the head. The ventrals number 151-180, and the subcaudals number 6-11.

The snout is obtusely pointed. The rostral is slightly less than ¼ the length of the shielded part of the head. The portion of the rostral visible from above is shorter than its distance from the frontal. The nasals are in contact with each other behind the rostral. The frontal is longer than broad. The eye is small, its diameter less than ½ the length of the ocular shield. The diameter of the body goes 25 to 33 times into the total length. The ventrals are about two times as large as the contiguous scales. The tail is round or slightly laterally compressed, the terminal dorsal scales distinctly pluricarinate. The terminal scute has a transverse ridge, but without points.

== Behaviour ==
U. petersi is terrestrial and fossorial.

== Reproduction ==
U. petersi is ovoviviparous.
