= Uropeltis macrorhyncha =

Conservation status
- Data Deficient (IUCN 3.1)

Scientific classification
- Kingdom: Animalia
- Phylum: Chordata
- Class: Reptilia
- Order: Squamata
- Suborder: Serpentes
- Family: Uropeltidae
- Genus: Uropeltis
- Species: U. macrorhyncha

Binomial name
- Uropeltis macrorhyncha (Beddome, 1877)

Synonyms
- Silybura macrorhyncha Beddome, 1877; Silybura macrorhynchus — Boulenger, 1893; Uropeltis macrorhynchus — M.A. Smith, 1943; Uropeltis (Siluboura) macrorhynchus — Mahendra, 1984; Uropeltis macrorhyncha — Das, 1996

Species of snake

Common names: Anaimalai earth snake, Anamally earth snake, Ponachi shieldtail

Uropeltis macrorhyncha is a species of nonvenomous snake in the family Uropeltidae. The species is endemic to India. There are no subspecies that are recognized as being valid.

== Geographic range ==
U. macrorhyncha is found in southern India in the Western Ghats: Anaimalai Hills, Madura District.

The type locality given is "Anamullay Mountains, 4,000 feet elevation."

Also, Beddome, 1886, gives a type locality of "Anamallays, dense forests above Ponachi, at an elevation of 4000 feet.

== Habitat ==
The preferred natural habitat of U. macrorhyncha is forest, at an altitude of about 1,200 m (3,900 ft).

== Description ==
The dorsum of U. macrorhyncha is brown. There is a yellow streak from the mouth along each side of the neck. There is a yellow streak on each side of the tail, connected by a yellow crossbar across the vent. The venter is brown mixed with yellow.

The type specimen is 57 cm (22 1/2 in) in total length (including tail).

The dorsal scales are in 19 rows behind the head, in 17 rows at midbody. The type specimen, a female, has 213 ventrals, and 6 subcaudals.

The snout is acutely pointed, strongly projecting. The rostral is strongly laterally compressed, keeled above, ½ the length of the shielded part of the head. The nasals are narrowly in contact behind the rostral. The frontal is as broad as long. The eye is very small, less than ⅓ the length of the ocular shield. The diameter of body goes 38 times into the total length. The ventrals are slightly less than two times as large as the contiguous scales. The end of the tail is subtruncate, the keeled dorsal portion small and rather flat, the scales with 3-5 strong keels. The terminal scute has two points.

== Reproduction ==
U. macrorhyncha is ovoviviparous.
