= Uropeltis nitida =

Conservation status
- Data Deficient (IUCN 3.1)

Scientific classification
- Kingdom: Animalia
- Phylum: Chordata
- Class: Reptilia
- Order: Squamata
- Suborder: Serpentes
- Family: Uropeltidae
- Genus: Uropeltis
- Species: U. nitida

Binomial name
- Uropeltis nitida (Beddome, 1878)

Synonyms
- Silybura nitida Beddome, 1878; Silybura nitida — Boulenger, 1893; Uropeltis nitidus — M.A. Smith, 1943; Uropeltis nitida — Das, 1996

Species of snake

Common names: southern earth snake, Cochin shieldtail.

Uropeltis nitida is a species of nonvenomous shieldtail snake (family Uropeltidae). The species is endemic to southern India. There are no subspecies that are recognized as being valid.

== Geographic range ==
U. nitida is found in southern India in the Western Ghats on the Cochin side of the Anaimalai Hills.

The type locality given in Beddome (1878) is "Anamallays, 4000 to 5000 ft" (1,200–1,500 m).

Beddome (1886) gives the type locality as "Anamallays, about the Nelliampady estates on the Cochin side, elevation 4000 to 5000 feet."

== Description ==
The dorsum of U. nitida is black. The venter is black with distant yellow crossbands, which are usually broken at the midline and alternating, but sometimes meet to form complete crossbands.

Adults may attain 35 cm (13 3/4 in) in total length (including tail).

The dorsal scales are smooth, and are arranged in 17 rows at midbody, in 19 rows behind the head. The ventrals number 184-195, and the subcaudals number 5-11.

The snout is obtusely pointed. The rostral is about ⅓ the length of the shielded part of the head. The portion of the rostral visible from above is longer than its distance from the frontal. The nasals are in contact with each other behind the rostral. The frontal is as long as broad or slightly longer than broad. The eye is small, its diameter less than ½ the length of the ocular shield. The diameter of body goes 30 to 35 times into the total length. The ventrals are two times as broad as the contiguous scales. The tail is round or slightly flattened dorsally, with the terminal dorsal scales strongly pluricarinate. The terminal scute has a transverse ridge and two points.

== Reproduction ==
U. nitida is ovoviviparous.
