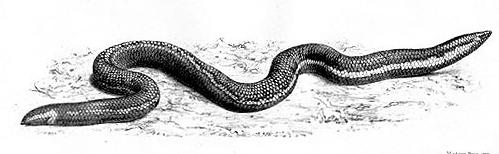
- Illustration by G.H. Ford from Günther's original description, 1875

Conservation status
- Data Deficient (IUCN 3.1)

Scientific classification
- Kingdom: Animalia
- Phylum: Chordata
- Class: Reptilia
- Order: Squamata
- Suborder: Serpentes
- Family: Uropeltidae
- Genus: Uropeltis
- Species: U. liura

Binomial name
- Uropeltis liura (Günther, 1875)

Synonyms
- Silybura liura Günther, 1875; Uropeltis liura — M.A. Smith, 1943

= Uropeltis liura =

Species of snake

Uropeltis liura, commonly known as the Ashambu shieldtail and Günther's earth snake, is a species of snake in the family Uropeltidae. The species is endemic to India.

== Geographic range ==
U. liura is found in southern India, in the Madura and Tinnevelly Hills, at elevations of 3,000–5,000 ft (910–1,520 m).

Type locality: "Malabar".

== Habitat ==
The preferred natural habitat of U. liura is forest, but it has also been found in cardamom and tea plantations.

== Description ==
The dorsum of U. liura is purplish brown, with each scale darker-edged, and with transverse series of small yellow black-edged ocelli. The venter and sides have large alternating black and yellow spots or crossbands.

Adults may attain 32 cm (12 1/2 in) in total length (including tail).

The dorsal scales are in 19 rows behind the head, in 17 rows at midbody. The ventrals number 174-188, and the subcaudals number 8-12.

The snout is obtusely pointed. The rostral is about ⅓ the length of the shielded part of the head, and the portion visible from above is as long as its distance from the frontal. The nasals are in contact with each other behind the rostral. The frontal is longer than broad. The eye is small, its diameter less than ½ the length of the ocular shield. The ventrals are twice as wide as the contiguous scales. The tail is round or slightly laterally compressed. The caudal dorsal scales are smooth or with very faint keels. The terminal scute is very small, with two points.

== Behavior ==
U. liura is fossorial, burrowing to a depth of 30 cm (12 in).

== Reproduction ==
U. liura is ovoviviparous. The young are born in May or June, and the usual litter size is four.
