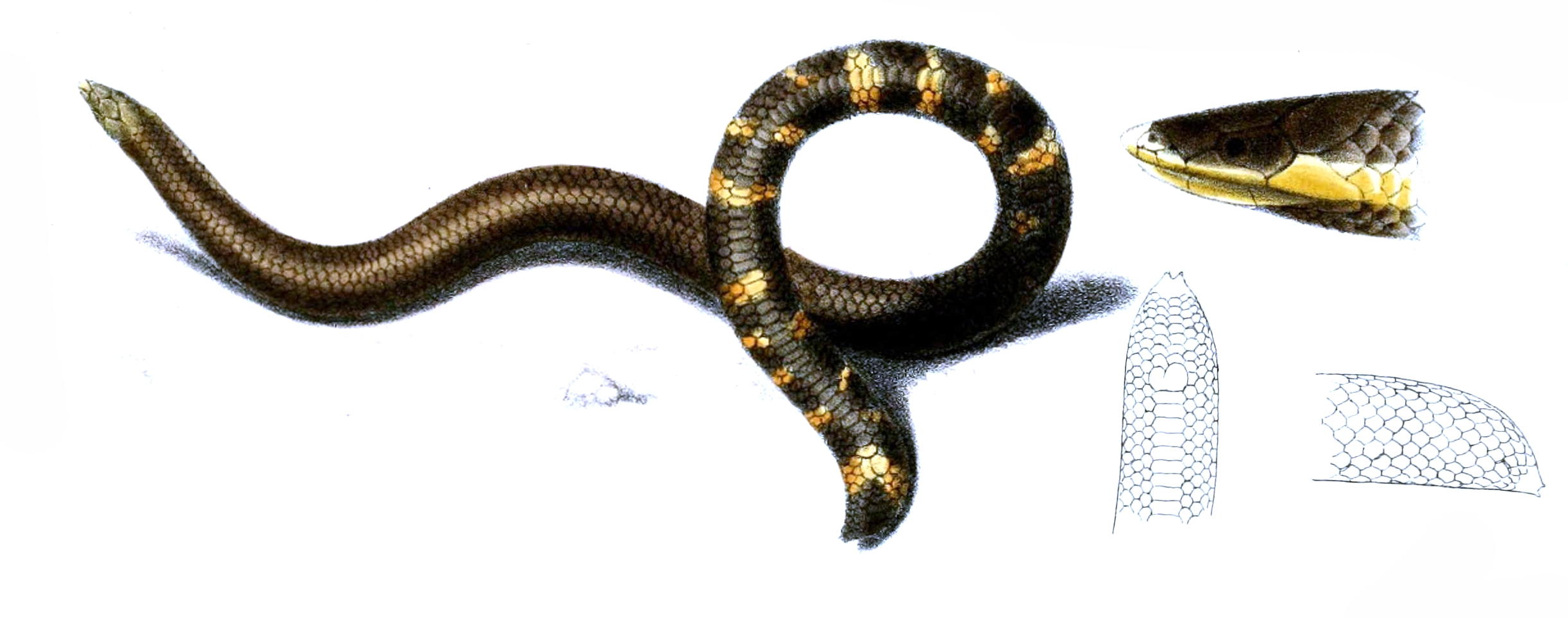
- Palni shieldtail

Conservation status
- Least Concern (IUCN 3.1)

Scientific classification
- Kingdom: Animalia
- Phylum: Chordata
- Class: Reptilia
- Order: Squamata
- Suborder: Serpentes
- Family: Uropeltidae
- Genus: Uropeltis
- Species: U. pulneyensis

Binomial name
- Uropeltis pulneyensis (Beddome, 1863)

Synonyms
- Plectrurus pulneyensis Beddome, 1863; Rhinophis pulneyensis — Günther, 1864; Silybura guentheri Beddome, 1878; Silybura pulneyensis — Beddome, 1886; Uropeltis pulneyensis — M.A. Smith, 1943

= Uropeltis pulneyensis =

Species of snake

Uropeltis pulneyensis, commonly known as the Indian earth snake and the Palni shieldtail, is a species of snake in the family Uropeltidae. The species is endemic to the Western Ghats of India.

== Description ==
The following description of U. pulneyensis is from Beddome (1864: 180):

rostral rather obtuse, produced back between the nasals, and touching the frontals [=prefrontals], nasals not meeting; eye small, in [the] front of the ocular shield; no supraorbitals; vertical [=frontal] 6-sided; occipitals [=parietals] rounded behind; 4 upper labials. Scales round the neck 19, round the body 17; subcaudals, male, about 12, female 6–8. Tail [laterally] compressed, ending in a small spinose keel, more or less bicuspid. Scales of the tail all smooth. Colour uniform earthy brown; a lateral bright yellow streak from the labials continued on each side of the trunk, about 1 or 1½ inch in length; a few minute yellow specks on the back; belly with broad bright yellow transverse bands, very irregular as to number and shape; yellow markings about the vent and tail.

Beddome (1864: 180) continues: "[pulneyensis and wynandensis] ... differ from the typical form of this genus in their much smaller size and in the absence of a supraorbital shield. As, however, they have the same [laterally] compressed tail, I prefer keeping them in this genus to making a new genus for them."

Boulenger (1893) adds the following details:

Adults may attain a total length of 38 cm (15 inches).

Portion of the rostral visible from above longer than its distance from the frontal. Frontal longer than broad. Diameter of the eye ½ the length of the ocular shield. Diameter of the body 30 to 38 times in the total length. Ventrals about twice as large as the contiguous scales, 161–180. Tail somewhat laterally compressed. Usually some of the terminal dorsal scales of the tail with faint keels.

== Geographic range ==
U. pulneyensis is found in the Southern Western Ghats in Tamil Nadu and Kerala states of South India, in the Palni Hills, High Wavy Mountains, and Travancore hills, at elevations of 5,000–7,000 ft (1,500–2,100 m).

- Type locality of Plectrurus pulneyensis: "Pulneys at an elevation of 7,000 to 8,000 feet" (2,100–2,400 m).
- Type locality of Silybura guentheri: "High Wavy mountain, Madurai district, 5000 feet elevation" (1,500 m).

== Habitat ==
The preferred natural habitat of U. pulneyensis is forest, but it has also been found in tea plantations and gardens.

== Behaviour ==
U. pulneyensis is terrestrial and fossorial.

== Reproduction ==
U. pulneyensis is ovoviviparous.
