= Uropeltis broughami =

Conservation status
- Data Deficient (IUCN 3.1)

Scientific classification
- Kingdom: Animalia
- Phylum: Chordata
- Class: Reptilia
- Order: Squamata
- Suborder: Serpentes
- Family: Uropeltidae
- Genus: Uropeltis
- Species: U. broughami

Binomial name
- Uropeltis broughami (Beddome, 1878)

Synonyms
- Silybura broughami Beddome, 1878; Silybura levingii Beddome, 1878; Uropeltis broughami — M.A. Smith, 1943

Species of snake

Uropeltis broughami, commonly known as Brougham's earth snake or the Sirumalai shieldtail, is a species of snake in the family Uropeltidae. The species is endemic to the Western Ghats in southern India.

== Etymology ==
The specific name, broughami, is in honor of British botanist Henry Brougham Guppy.

== Geographic range ==
U. broughami is found in the Sirumalai Hills and Palni Hills in Tamil Nadu, southern India.

Type locality of Silybura broughami = "Sirumallay hills (Madura district), 5500 feet elevation".Type locality of Silybura levingii = "Lower Pulney hills (Madura district), 4000 feet elevation".

== Description ==
The dorsum of U. broughami is brown, with transverse series of small yellow black-edged ocelli. The sides have a series of large yellow spots. The ventrals are dark brown.

It grows to 41 cm (16 1/8 in) in total length (including tail).

The dorsal scales are arranged in 19 rows at midbody. The ventrals number 203–230, and the subcaudals numbersubcaudals 7-10.

The snout is acutely pointed. The rostral is laterally compressed, obtusely keeled above, two fifths the length of the shielded part of the head, the portion visible from above much longer than its distance from the frontal. The nasals are in contact with each other behind the rostral. The frontal is as long as broad, or slightly longer than broad. The eye is very small, not half the length of the ocular. The diameter of the body goes 34 to 40 times into the total length. The ventrals are not twice as broad as the contiguous dorsal scales. The tail is obliquely truncate, flat above, with strongly pluricarinate scales. The terminal scute is bicuspid.

== Reproduction ==
U. broughami is viviparous.
