= Uropeltis ruhunae =

Scientific classification
- Kingdom: Animalia
- Phylum: Chordata
- Class: Reptilia
- Order: Squamata
- Suborder: Serpentes
- Family: Uropeltidae
- Genus: Uropeltis
- Species: U. ruhunae

Binomial name
- Uropeltis ruhunae Deraniyagala, 1954

Species of snake

Uropeltis ruhunae is a species of snake in the family Uropeltidae. The species is endemic to Sri Lanka.

== Etymology ==
The specific name, ruhunae, refers to the ancient Sri Lankan Principality of Ruhuna.
