= Rhinophis phillipsi =

Conservation status
- Critically Endangered (IUCN 3.1)

Scientific classification
- Kingdom: Animalia
- Phylum: Chordata
- Class: Reptilia
- Order: Squamata
- Suborder: Serpentes
- Family: Uropeltidae
- Genus: Rhinophis
- Species: R. phillipsi

Binomial name
- Rhinophis phillipsi (Nicholls, 1929)

Synonyms
- Silybura phillipsi Nicholls, 1929; Uropeltis phillipsi — M.A. Smith, 1943

Species of snake

Rhinophis phillipsi, commonly known as Phillips' earth snake, is a species of nonvenomous snake in the family Uropeltidae. The species is endemic to Sri Lanka.

== Etymology ==
The specific name, phillipsi, is in honor of British naturalist Major William Watt Addison Phillips (1892–1981).

== See also ==
- Genus Uropeltis.
