= R. grandis =

R. grandis may refer to:

- Rangea grandis, a frond-like fossil from the Precambrian era
- Rhagio grandis, a predatory snipe fly species in the genus Rhagio
- Richeria grandis, the bois bande, a tree species found in the Caribbean Islands
- Rhabdornis grandis, the long-billed creeper, long-billed rhabdornis or grand rhabdornis, a bird species endemic to Luzon Island in the Philippines

== Synonyms ==
- Rhinophis grandis, a synonym for Uropeltis smithi, a snake species found in India

== See also ==
- Grandis (disambiguation)
