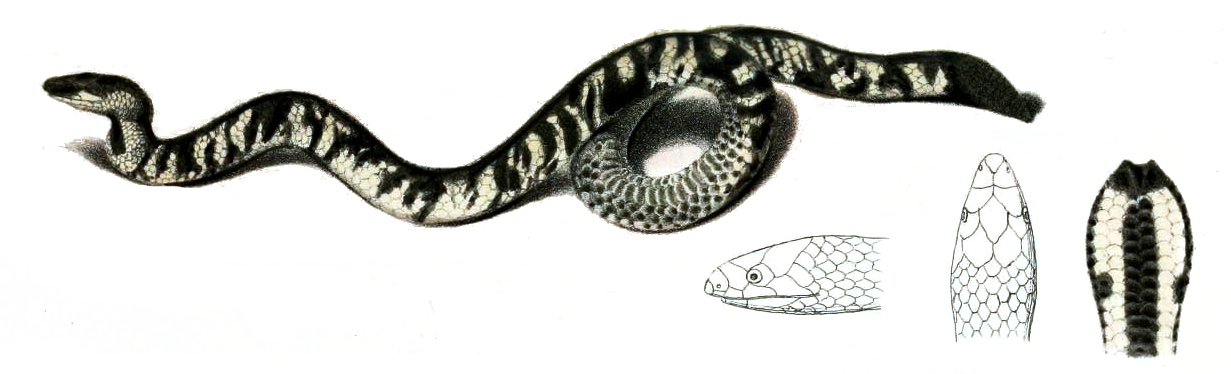

Conservation status
- Data Deficient (IUCN 3.1)

Scientific classification
- Kingdom: Animalia
- Phylum: Chordata
- Class: Reptilia
- Order: Squamata
- Suborder: Serpentes
- Family: Uropeltidae
- Genus: Uropeltis
- Species: U. ceylanica

Binomial name
- Uropeltis ceylanica Cuvier, 1829

Synonyms
- Uropeltis ceylanicus Cuvier, 1829; Uropeltis Ceylanicus — Cocteau, 1833; Uropeltis ceylonica — Wagler, 1830; Pseudo-typhlops ceylanicus — Schlegel, 1839; Siluboura Ceylonicus — Gray, 1845; U[ropeltis]. Ceylonicus — Gray, 1845; [Coloburus] Ceylanicus — A.M.C. Duméril & A.H.A. Duméril, 1854; Siluboura ceylonica — Gray, 1858; Silybura ceylanica — W. Peters, 1861; Silybura brevis Günther, 1862; C[oloburus]. Ceylanicus — Jan, 1863; Silybura nilgherriensis Beddome, 1863; Siluboura ceylanica — Günther, 1864; S[ilybura]. ceylonica — Günther, 1875; Silybura nilgherriensis var. annulata Beddome, 1886; Silybura brevis — Boulenger, 1893; Silybura ellioti var. annulata — Boulenger, 1893; Uropeltis ceylanicus — M.A. Smith, 1943; Uropeltis (Siluboura) ceylanicus — Mahendra, 1984; U[ropeltis]. ceylanicus annulata — Murthy, 1990

= Uropeltis ceylanica =

Species of snake

Common names: Ceylon earth snake, Cuvier's shieldtail, Kerala shieldtail.

Uropeltis ceylanica is a species of nonvenomous shieldtail snake in the family Uropeltidae. The species is endemic to the Western Ghats of South India. No subspecies are currently recognized as being valid, but the presence of several synonyms, many recently resurrected, calls for further taxonomic studies of this species complex. It is a burrowing snake with a pointy head equipped to penetrate the soil. It has a thick tail which looks as if it has been cut at an angle. In Kerala it's called iru thala moori, which means two headed organism, as the tail end looks like another head. It primarily eats earth worms.

== Geographic range ==
U. ceylanica is found in the Western Ghats of southern India from Goa, Castle Rock southwards to Travancore (Agasthyamalai) near Trivandrum. The type locality given as "Ceylan"— is a mistake, since this species has never been found in Sri Lanka.

== Description ==
The dorsum of U. ceylanica is brown or blackish brown; sometimes patterned with spots or streaks. The venter is yellowish; some specimens have dark brown spots or are entirely brown. The ventral side of the tail is brown or black in the middle, and yellow on the sides.

Adults may attain a total length (including tail) of 45 cm (18 in).

The dorsal scales are arranged in 17 rows at midbody (in 19 rows behind the head). The ventrals number 120-146; the subcaudals number 8-12.

The snout is rounded. The rostral is one-fourth the length of the shielded part of the head. Portions of the rostral are visible from above and shorter than its distance from the frontal. Nasals are in contact with each other behind the rostral. The frontal is slightly longer than it is broad. The diameter of the eyes is more than half the length of the ocular shield. The total length of the snake is 21 to 29 times the diameter of the body. The ventrals are twice as large as the contiguous scales. The end of tail is flat dorsally, obliquely truncated, with strongly keeled scales which are bi-, tri-, or quadricarinate. It has a terminal scute with a transverse ridge and two points.
