= Uropeltis bhupathyi =

Conservation status
- Data Deficient (IUCN 3.1)

Scientific classification
- Kingdom: Animalia
- Phylum: Chordata
- Order: Squamata
- Suborder: Serpentes
- Family: Uropeltidae
- Genus: Uropeltis
- Species: U. bhupathyi

Binomial name
- Uropeltis bhupathyi Jins, Sampaio & Gower, 2018

Synonyms
- Uropeltis ellioti Kannan & Bhupathy, 1997

Species of snake

Uropeltis bhupathyi, commonly known as the Bhupathy’s shieldtail, is a species of snake in the family Uropeltidae. The species is endemic to the Western Ghats in southern India.

== Etymology ==
U. bhupathyi is named in honour of Indian herpetologist and biologist Subramanian Bhupathy.

== Distribution ==
The species, although native to the Western Ghats in India, has so far only been traced in the Anaikatti hills in Coimbatore district, Tamil Nadu.

== Description ==
U. bhupathyi, a non-venomous burrowing species, usually feeds on earthworms. It possesses over 200 ventral scales and 17 dorsal scale rows at midbody. The tail is short and obliquely truncate. It has keeled scales. It is dark brown in colour, with yellow stripes on either side of neck and tail. It has a metallic appearance. The species has a moderately developed tail shield. The terminal scute is wide and surrounded by 8-10 scales.

It grows to about 40 cm in total length.

The species suffers the risk of habitat loss. It is also affected by road traffic and pesticides. It also possibly suffers from a condition rendering its head deformed, reminiscent of the snake fungal disease prevalent in North America and Europe.
