= Smith's earth snake =

Conservation status
- Near Threatened (IUCN 3.1)

Scientific classification
- Kingdom: Animalia
- Phylum: Chordata
- Class: Reptilia
- Order: Squamata
- Suborder: Serpentes
- Family: Uropeltidae
- Genus: Uropeltis
- Species: U. grandis

Binomial name
- Uropeltis grandis (Beddome, 1867)

Synonyms
- (non Uropeltis grandis Kelaart, 1853); Rhinophis grandis Beddome, 1867; Silybura grandis — Beddome, 1886; Silybura grandis — Boulenger, 1893; Uropeltis grandis — M.A. Smith, 1943; Uropeltis smithi Gans, 1966 (nomen novum); Uropeltis grandis — Pyron et al., 2016

Species of snake

Smith's earth snake (Uropeltis grandis), also known commonly as the violet shieldtail, is a species of nonvenomous snake in the family Uropeltidae. The species is endemic to India.

== Geographic range ==
U. grandis is found in the Anaimalai Hills of Kerala, southern India.

== Taxonomy ==
U. grandis had been classified in the past as Rhinophis grandis Beddome, Silybura grandis (Beddome), and Uropeltis grandis (Beddome). In 1966 Carl Gans renamed this species Uropeltis smithi in honor of American herpetologist Hobart M. Smith.

== Description ==
Smith's earth snake, like all shieldtail snakes, has a characteristic pointed head and flattened tail.

The dorsum is dark violet. The venter is dark violet with alternating large yellow spots or crossbands.

Adults may attain 48 cm (18 7/8 in) in total length (including tail).

The smooth dorsal scales are arranged in 19 rows at midbody (in 21 rows behind the head). The ventrals number 198-218; and the subcaudals number 6-12.

The snout is pointed. The rostral is ⅓ or ¼ the length of the shielded part of the head. The portion of the rostral visible from above is longer than its distance from the frontal. The nasals are either in contact with each other behind the rostral, or separated from each other by the rostral. The frontal is longer than broad. The eye is very small, its diameter less than ½ the length of the ocular shield. The diameter of the body goes 30 to 40 times into the total length. The ventrals are about two times as large as the contiguous scales, and are pluricarinate posteriorly in males. The tail is round or slightly laterally compressed, and the dorsal scales of the tail are strongly pluricarinate. The terminal scute has two small spines.

== Habitat ==
The preferred natural habitat of U. grandis is moist forest, at altitudes of 1,200–1,400 m (3,900–4,600 ft).

== Reproduction ==
U. grandis is viviparous.
