= Purple-red earth snake =

Conservation status
- Least Concern (IUCN 3.1)

Scientific classification
- Kingdom: Animalia
- Phylum: Chordata
- Class: Reptilia
- Order: Squamata
- Suborder: Serpentes
- Family: Uropeltidae
- Genus: Teretrurus
- Species: T. sanguineus

Binomial name
- Teretrurus sanguineus (Beddome, 1867)

Synonyms
- Plectrurus sanguineus Beddome, 1867; Teretrurus sanguineus; Beddome, 1886; Platyplectrurus sanguinensis - Boulenger, 1893; Teretrurus sanguineus; M.A. Smith, 1943

Species of snake

The purple-red earth snake (Teretrurus sanguineus) is a species of nonvenomous shield-tail snake, endemic to southern India. No subspecies are currently recognized.

== Geographic range ==
Found in southern India in Wynaad, Travancore (in Nalumukku at 1,350 m elevation and Oothu at 1,300 m), the Manimuthar Hills (in the Western Ghats of the Tinnevelly district) and Nyamakad (Western Ghats of the Kerala Munar Hills at 2,200 m).

The type locality given is "Anamallay forests; 4,000 feet elevation."

== Description ==
The dorsum of this species is brown or purplish red; the ventrum is red, blotched with black in some specimens. Its total length is 22 cm (8 5/8 in).

The dorsal scales are arranged in 15 rows at midbody (17 rows behind the head). Ventrals number 120–150; the subcaudals range from 5–10.

The eye is distinct from the neighboring shields and is of moderate size. Thhe snout is obtuse; the rostral is small, but visible from above. Frontal longer than broad. Supraocular about as large as the eye, as long as or shorter than the prefrontals. The temporal is about half the length of the parietals. The diameter of the body ps 22 to 28 times in the total length. Ventrals are nearly two times as broad as the contiguous scales. In females, the dorsal scales of the tail are smooth or faintly keeled. In males, all of the dorsal scales of the tail plus the last ventrals are pluricarinated. The tail ends in a simple, laterally compressed point.
