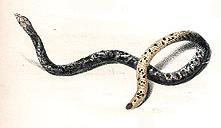

Conservation status
- Least Concern (IUCN 3.1)

Scientific classification
- Kingdom: Animalia
- Phylum: Chordata
- Class: Reptilia
- Order: Squamata
- Suborder: Serpentes
- Family: Uropeltidae
- Genus: Rhinophis
- Species: R. sanguineus

Binomial name
- Rhinophis sanguineus Beddome, 1863

Synonyms
- Rhinophis sanguineus Beddome, 1863; Rhinophis microlepis Beddome, 1863; Rhinophis sanguineus - Beddome, 1886; Rhinophis sanguineus - Boulenger, 1890

= Rhinophis sanguineus =

Species of snake

Rhinophis sanguineus, commonly known as the salty earth snake, is a species of uropeltid snake found in the Western Ghats of India.

== Description ==
Description after Beddome (1864: 178): "Scales of the body large, in 15 rows; of the anterior portion of the trunk sometimes in 17; rostral much produced, very sharp, conical, horny, produced back, and covering the conjunction of the nasals; nostril in front of nasal shield; eye very small and obscure, [located] in front [portion] of ocular shield; four upper labials, 1st small, 2nd, 3rd, and 4th large; caudal disk nearly as long as tail, oblong, covered with excrescences, a red streak down the centre and one on each side. Colour of the body bluish black; belly bright red, with blackish mottlings; anal bifid; subcaudals of the male 9 or 10 pairs, each with 4 to 6 keels, and some of the approximated ventral plates and a few of the two lowest rows of scales also keeled; female subcaudals 6 or 7. Total length of large male 13 inches [33 cm], female 10 inches [25.5 cm]; circumference 1 inch [25 mm]; abdominals 195. The brilliant red colour of the abdomen fades in spirits."

Description of Rhinophis microlepis after Beddome (1864: 179): "Scales of the body small, in 15 rows; of the anterior portion of the trunk in 17, of the neck in 19. Caudal disk oblong, orbicular, one-half the length of the tail, covered with excrescences, which are confluent into streaks; subcaudals 10; anal bifid; head-plates as in R. sanguineus, but rostral less sharp. Colour of the body greyish black, with indistinct dull yellowish white mottlings; belly yellowish white, with dark mottlings; tail beneath yellowish, with a broad black spot. Abdominals very small, 199. Total length 6 inches [15 cm]; circumference 6½ lines [14 mm]"

== Geographic range ==
It is found in southern India (Mysore [Koppa, Kalsa], Wynaad, Nilgiris, Travancore, Tinnevelly).

Type locality of Rhinophis sanguineus: "Cherambady [Cherambody], in the Wayanad (Malabar), elevation 3,500 feet".

Type locality of Rhinophis microlepis: "Mr. Minchin's Estate in the Wayanad (elevation 3,500 feet)".
