= Rhinophis travancoricus =

Conservation status
- Endangered (IUCN 3.1)

Scientific classification
- Kingdom: Animalia
- Phylum: Chordata
- Class: Reptilia
- Order: Squamata
- Suborder: Serpentes
- Family: Uropeltidae
- Genus: Rhinophis
- Species: R. travancoricus

Binomial name
- Rhinophis travancoricus Boulenger, 1892

Species of snake

Rhinophis travancoricus, commonly known as the Travancore shieldtail or Tamil Nadu earth snake, is a species of uropeltid snake endemic to India.

== Geographic range ==
It is found in southern India (Travancore, Trivandrum, Peermade, Ernakulam).

Type locality: "near Trevandrum, at the 6th mile-stone towards Vambayam".

== Description ==
Dark purplish brown, scales on the sides and on the ventrum edged with whitish. Anal region black. Ventral surface of tail yellow.

The total length of the type specimen is 17 cm (6 3/4 in).

Dorsal scales in 17 rows at midbody (in 19 rows behind the head). Ventrals 146; subcaudals 6.

Snout acutely pointed. Rostral slightly laterally compressed, not keeled, about ⅓ the length of the shielded part of the head. Nasals separated by the rostral. Eye in the ocular shield. No supraoculars. Frontal longer than broad. No temporals. No mental groove. Diameter of body 34 times in the total length. Ventrals about 1½ times the size of the contiguous scales. Tail ending in a large convex rugose shield, which is neither truncated nor spinose at the end. Caudal disc slightly shorter than the shielded part of the head.
