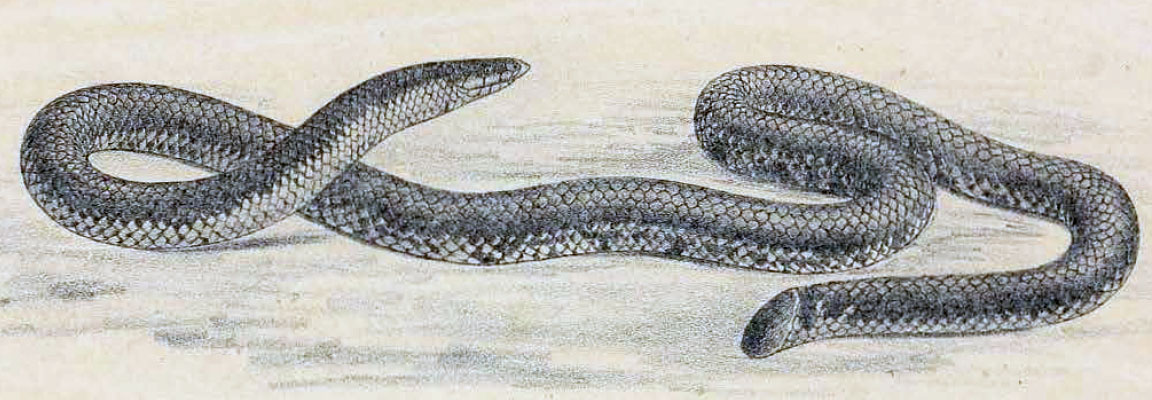
- Illustration from the original species description published in 1896 by George Albert Boulenger

Conservation status
- Data Deficient (IUCN 3.1)

Scientific classification
- Kingdom: Animalia
- Phylum: Chordata
- Class: Reptilia
- Order: Squamata
- Suborder: Serpentes
- Family: Uropeltidae
- Genus: Rhinophis
- Species: R. fergusonianus

Binomial name
- Rhinophis fergusonianus Boulenger, 1896

= Rhinophis fergusonianus =

Species of snake

Rhinophis fergusonianus, commonly known as the Cardamom Hills earth snake, is a species of uropeltid snake endemic to the Western Ghats, India.

== Etymology ==
The specific name, fergusonianus, is in honor of Scottish zoologist Harold S. Ferguson.

== Geographic range ==
R. fergusonianus is only known from the type specimen collected in the Cardamom Hills in Travancore, a part of the southern Western Ghats in modern Kerala, southeastern India. Recent studies found their occurrence in the districts of Malappuram, Palakkad, Thrissur, Ernakulam districts of Kerala, from both side of palghat gap.

== Description ==
The holotype of R. fergusonianus measures 32 cm (13 in) in total length (including tail), 40 times its width. The eyes are very small. The snout is acutely pointed. The body is longitudinally striated. It is blackish above, and the sides are white, dotted and spotted with black. The belly is white, with black dots and two series of large black spots, partially confluent into a zigzag band. The caudal disc is black and edged all round with yellow.

== Reproduction ==
R. fergusonianus is viviparous.

== Habitat and conservation ==
The habitats and ecology of this species, R. fergusonianus, and threats to it, are unknown.
