= Uropeltis arcticeps =

Conservation status
- Data Deficient (IUCN 3.1)

Scientific classification
- Kingdom: Animalia
- Phylum: Chordata
- Class: Reptilia
- Order: Squamata
- Suborder: Serpentes
- Family: Uropeltidae
- Genus: Uropeltis
- Species: U. arcticeps

Binomial name
- Uropeltis arcticeps (Günther, 1875)

Synonyms
- Silybura arcticeps Günther, 1875; Silybura madurensis Beddome, 1878; Silybura nilgherriensis var. picta Beddome, 1886; Uropeltis arcticeps — M.A. Smith, 1943

Species of snake

Uropeltis arcticeps, commonly known as the Madurai earth snake or the Tinevelly uropeltis, is a species of snake in the family Uropeltidae. The species is endemic to India.

== Geographic distribution ==
U. arcticeps is found in South India (Western Ghats south of Palghat; from sea level (Alleppey) to about 5,000 feet in the Travancore Hills; Tinnevelly Hills).

The type locality of Silybura arcticeps is "Tinevelly, S India", and the type locality of Silybura nilgherriensis var. picta is "North Travancore near Peermede, on coffee estate at an elevation between 3000 and 4000 feet, S India".
