= Karnataka burrowing snake =

Conservation status
- Data Deficient (IUCN 3.1)

Scientific classification
- Kingdom: Animalia
- Phylum: Chordata
- Class: Reptilia
- Order: Squamata
- Suborder: Serpentes
- Family: Uropeltidae
- Genus: Pseudoplectrurus; Boulenger, 1890
- Species: P. canaricus

Binomial name
- Pseudoplectrurus canaricus (Beddome, 1870)

Synonyms
- Silybura canarica Beddome, 1870; Plectrurus canaricus; Günther, 1875; Pseudoplectrurus canaricus; Boulenger, 1890; Plectrurus canaricus; M.A. Smith, 1943

Species of snake

The Karnataka burrowing snake (Pseudoplectrurus canaricus) is a species of uropeltid snake endemic to India.

== Geographic range ==
It is found in southern India.

Type locality: "South Canara, [...] on the top of the Kudra Mukh, a mountain 6000 feet high" (elevation).

== Description ==
Dorsum brownish violet, each scale usually paler in the center. Lips yellow, some yellow blotches on the anterior sides of the body, and in some specimens small yellow spots on the back. Ventral surface of tail yellow, with in some specimens a black median streak.

Adults may attain a total length of 43 cm (17 inches).

Dorsal scales arranged in 15 rows at midbody, in 19 rows behind the head. Ventrals 172–188; subcaudals 6–13.

Snout obtuse. Portion of the rostral visible from above shorter than its distance from the frontal. Nasals in contact with each other, forming a suture behind the rostral. No supraoculars. Frontal longer than broad. Diameter of eye less than ½ the length of the ocular shield. Diameter of body 32 to 43 times in the total length. Ventrals less than 2 times as large as the contiguous scales. Tail laterally compressed. Dorsal scales on the tail smooth or weakly pluricarinate. Terminal scute laterally compressed, with two superposed points, which are simple or bifid.
