= Goa Gap =

Third Approach
- Location: India
- Range: Western Ghats

The Goa Gap is one of the major passes in India's Western Ghats mountain range, between the Maharashtra and Karnataka sections of the range.
