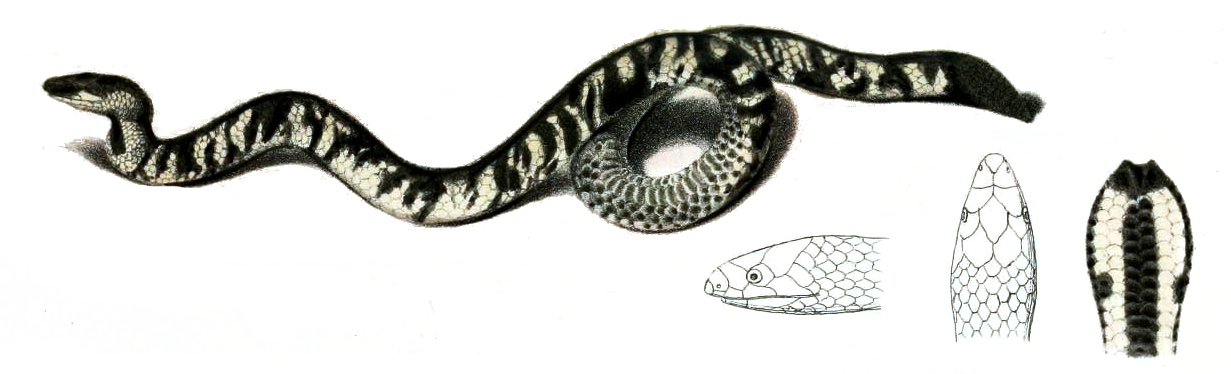
- Cuvier's shield-tail snake (U. ceylanica)

Scientific classification
- Domain: Eukaryota
- Kingdom: Animalia
- Phylum: Chordata
- Class: Reptilia
- Order: Squamata
- Suborder: Serpentes
- Family: Uropeltidae
- Genus: Uropeltis; Cuvier, 1829

Synonyms
- Coloburus A.H.A. Duméril In A.M.C. Duméril & A.H.A. Duméril, 1851; Siloboura Gray, 1858; Silybura W. Peters, 1861

= Uropeltis =

Genus of snakes

Common names: shield-tail snakes, shield-tailed snakes, earth snakes.

Uropeltis is a genus of nonvenomous shield-tail snakes endemic to Peninsular India. As of 2022, 26 species are recognized as being valid.

== Geographic range ==
Most Uropeltis species are found in the hills of Peninsular India, mainly in the southwestern parts of the country, including the Western Ghats and, to some extent, also in the Eastern Ghats and in the hills of Central India.

== Description ==
Species in the genus Uropeltis share the following characters. The eye is in the ocular shield. There are no supraoculars nor temporals. There is no mental groove. The tail is conical or obliquely truncated, terminating in a small scute, the end of which is square, or bicuspid with the points side by side.

== Species ==
Species	Taxon author	Common name	Geographic range
U. arcticeps	(Günther, 1875)	Tinevelly shield-tail snake	the Tirunelveli Hills
U. beddomii	(Günther, 1862)	Beddome's shield-tail snake	the Anaimalai Hills
U. bhupathyi	Jins, Sampaio & Gower, 2018	Bhupathy's shield-tail snake	Tamil Nadu
U. bicatenata	(Günther, 1875)	two-chained shield-tail snake	the Pune Hills
U. broughami	(Beddome, 1878)	Brougham's shield-tail snake	the Palni Hills
U. ceylanica^{T}	Cuvier, 1829	Cuvier's shield-tail snake	the Western Ghats south of Goa
U. dindigalensis	(Beddome, 1877)	Dindigul shield-tail snake	the Sirumalai Hills
U. ellioti	(Gray, 1858)	Elliot's shield-tail snake	the hills of Peninsular India
U. grandis	(Beddome, 1867)	Smith's earth snake	the Anaimalai Hills
U. jerdoni	Ganesh, Punith, Adhikari & Achyuthan, 2021	Jerdon’s shield-tail snake	India (Karnataka)
U. liura	(Günther, 1875)	Günther's shield-tail snake	the southern Western Ghats
U. macrolepis	(W. Peters, 1862)	Bombay shield-tail snake	the northern Western Ghats
U. macrorhyncha	(Beddome, 1877)	Ponachi shield-tail snake	the Anaimalai Hills
U. maculata	(Beddome, 1878)	spotted shield-tail snake	the Anaimalai Hills
U. madurensis	(Beddome, 1878)	Madura earth snake	Meghamalai
U. myhendrae	(Beddome, 1886)	barred shield-tail snake	the Agasthyamalai Hills
U. nitida	(Beddome, 1878)	Cochin shield-tail snake	the Anaimalai Hills and Nelliyampathi
U. ocellata	(Beddome, 1863)	Nilgiri shield-tail snake	the Western Ghats south of Nilgiris
U. petersi	(Beddome, 1878)	Peters' shield-tail snake	the Anaimalai Hills
U. phipsonii	(Mason, 1888)	Phipson's shield-tail snake	the northern Western Ghats
U. pulneyensis	(Beddome, 1863)	Palni shield-tail snake	the southern Western Ghats
U. rajendrani	Ganesh & Achyuthan, 2020	Rajendran's shield-tail snake	the southern Eastern Ghats
U. rubrolineata	(Günther, 1875)	red-lined shield-tail snake	the southern Western Ghats
U. rubromaculata	(Beddome, 1867)	red-spotted shield-tail snake	the Anaimalai Hills
U. shorttii	(Beddome, 1863)	Shevaroy Hills earth snake	Yercaud
U. woodmasoni	(W. Theobald, 1876)	Palni shield-tail snake, black-bellied shield tail snake	the Palni Hills

^{T} Type species.

Nota bene: A taxon author in parentheses indicates that the species was originally described in a genus other than Uropeltis.
