= Nasal scale =

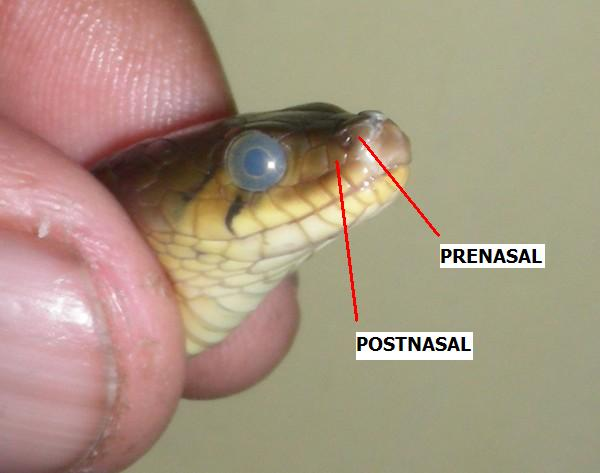
Prenasal and postnasal scales

In reptiles, the nasal scale refers to the scale that encloses the nostril.

Sometimes this scale is paired (divided). In such cases, the anterior half is referred to as the prenasal and the posterior half is referred to as the postnasal.

Supranasal scales are located above the nasal scale.

== See also ==
- Snake scales
- Anatomical terms of location
- Nasal (disambiguation)
