= Frontal scale =

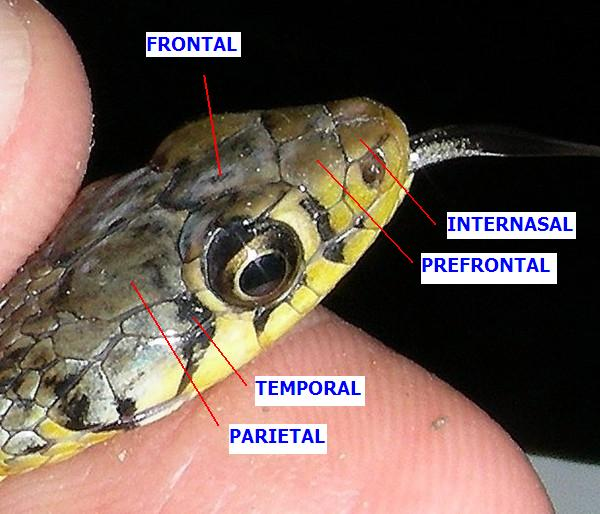
Scales on a snake's head

Frontal scale refers to the scale of a reptile which lies on the top of the head in the region between the eyes. This is analogous to the frontal bone of a human which corresponds to the forehead.

Snake scales adjacent to the frontal and to its anterior are called prefrontals.

== See also ==
- Frontal bone
- Frontal shield
- Snake scales
- Anatomical terms of location
