= Rostral scale =

Reptile scale type

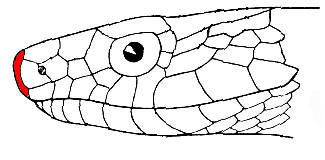
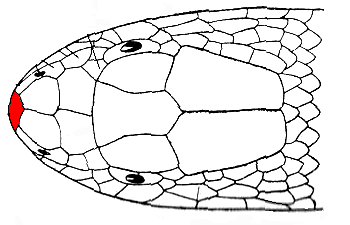
Head of the rat snake Coluber ventromaculatus in lateral (left) and dorsal (right) views with the rostral scale highlighted

The rostral scale, or rostral, in snakes and other scaled reptiles is the median (midline) plate on the tip of the snout that borders the mouth opening. It corresponds to the mental scale in the lower jaw. The term pertains to the rostrum, or nose. In snakes, the shape and size of this scale are among the characteristics used to differentiate species from one another.

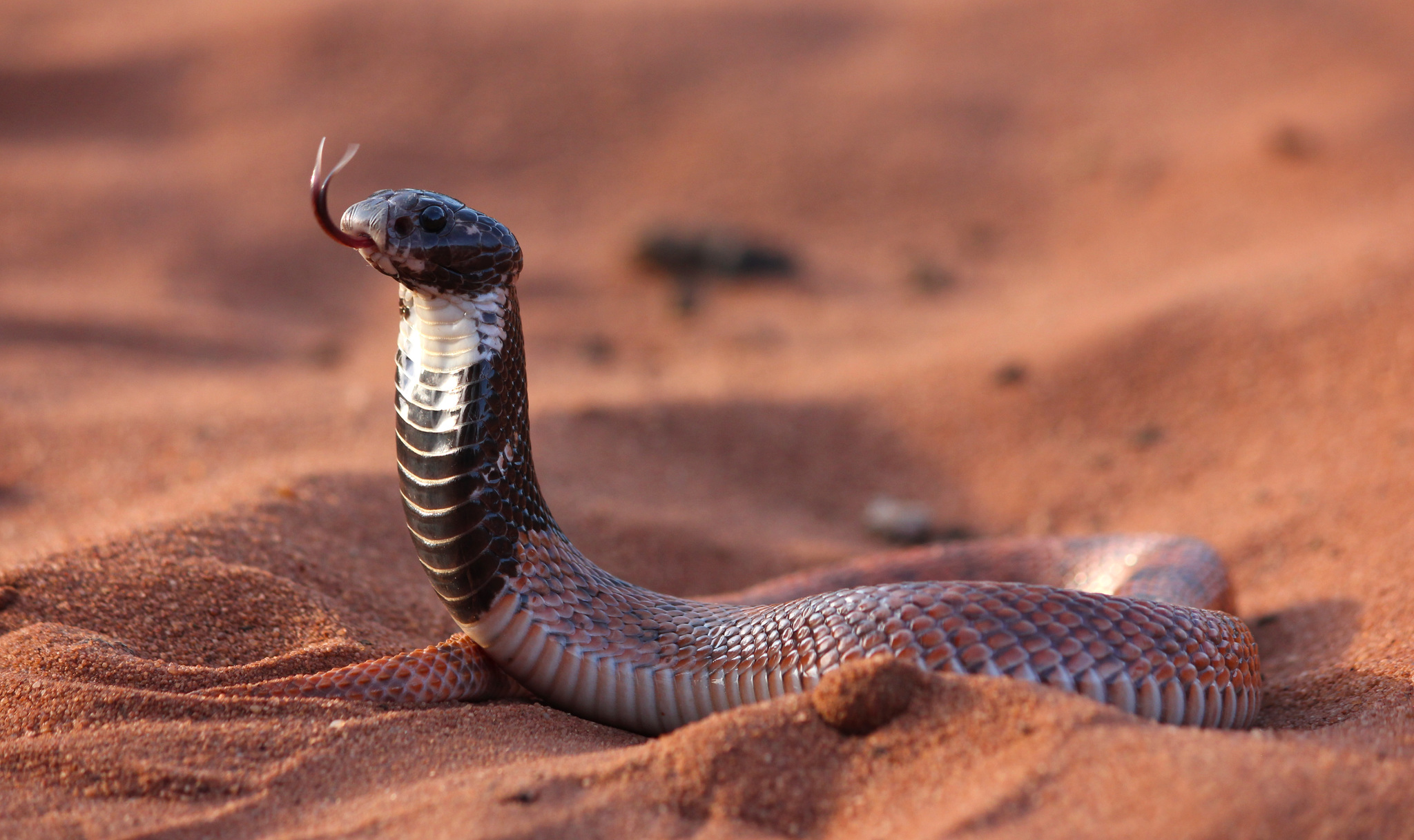
The shield-nosed cobra (Aspidelaps scutatus) has a greatly enlarged rostral scale.

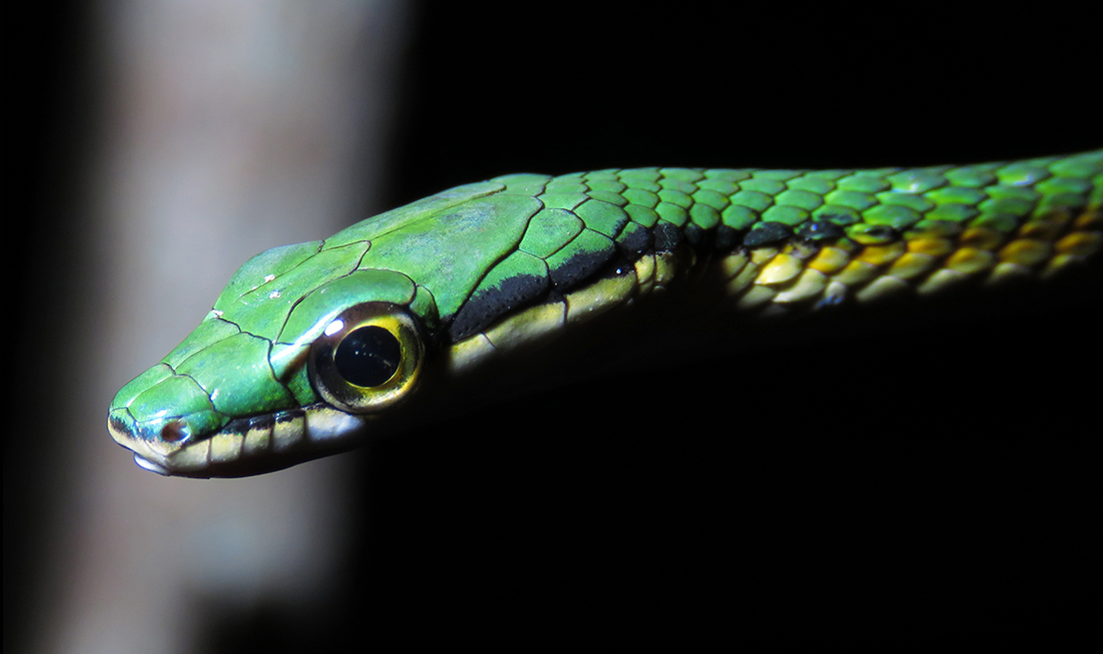
The parrot snake Leptophis mystacinus is named for the dark patch on its rostral scale.

== Related scales ==
- Nasorostral scale
- Mental scale
- Labial scales

== See also ==
- Snake scales
- Anatomical terms of location
