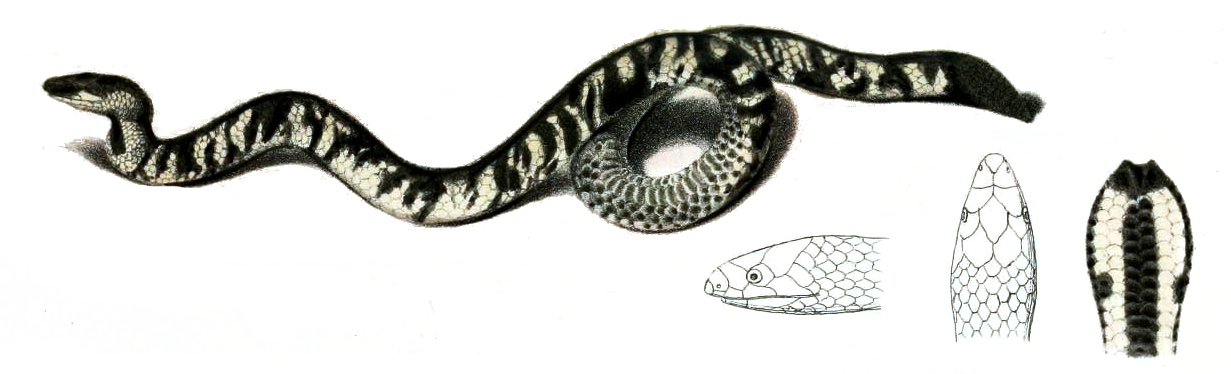
- Cuvier's shield-tail snake (Uropeltis ceylanica)

Scientific classification
- Kingdom: Animalia
- Phylum: Chordata
- Class: Reptilia
- Order: Squamata
- Suborder: Serpentes
- Superfamily: Uropeltoidea
- Family: Uropeltidae; J.P. Müller, 1832

Synonyms
- Uropeltana J.P. Müller, 1832; Uropeltacea J.P. Müller, 1832; Rhinophes Fitzinger, 1843; Uropeltidae Gray, 1845; Uropeltina Gray, 1858; Plecturina Gray, 1858; Rhinophidae Cope, 1900; Uropeltinae McDowell, 1975

= Uropeltidae =

Family of snakes

The Uropeltidae, also commonly known as shield-tail snakes, shield-tailed snakes or earth snakes, are a family of primitive, nonvenomous, burrowing snakes native to Peninsular India and Sri Lanka. The name is derived from the Greek words ura (tail) and pelte (shield), indicating the presence of the large, keratinous shield at the tip of the tail. Seven or eight genera are recognized, depending on whether Teretrurus rhodogaster is treated in its own genus or as part of Brachyophidium. The family comprises over 50 species, but they are not well known in terms of their diversity, biology, and natural history.

== Description ==
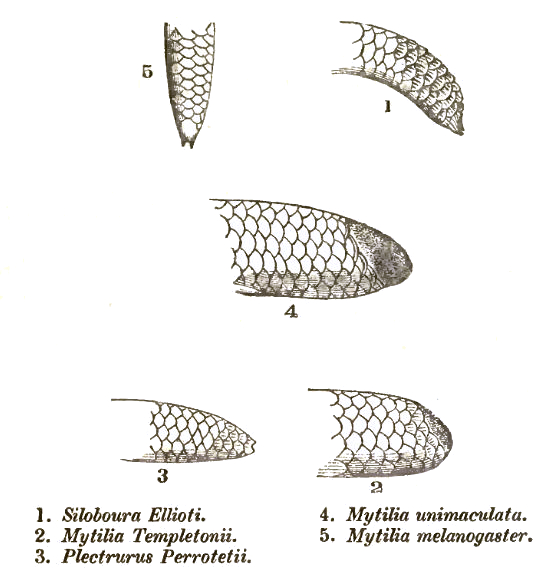
Tails of Uropeltidae

Snakes in the family Uropeltidae are small snakes, with adults growing to a total length (including tail) of 20–75 cm (7.9–29.5 in). They are adapted to a fossorial way of life, which is apparent in their anatomy. The skull is primitive and inflexible, with a short, vertical quadrate bone and rigid jaws; the coronoid bone is still present in the lower jaw. The orbital bones are absent, the supratemporal is vestigial, and the eyes are small and degenerated, not covered by a brille, but by large, polygonal shields. However, the pelvis and hind limbs, the presence of which is also considered a primitive trait, have disappeared in this family.

The tail is characteristic, ending in either an enlarged, rigid scale with two points, or more often an upper surface with a subcircular area covered with thickened, spiny scales, or a much enlarged, spiny plate. The ventral scales are much reduced in size. The body is cylindrical and covered with smooth scales.

== Behaviour and natural history ==
Many species of shield-tail snakes are rather poorly known in terms of natural history. Field studies indicate that most species are obligate burrowers and may often come out on to soil surface during rainy nights. Even roadkills of these snakes have been recorded by field biologists during peak monsoon rains. They seem to prefer the humus-rich topsoil layers and rarely burrow deeper inside (like during very hot or dry weather).

When approached by predators, these snakes do not bite like most snakes, but coil their bodies into a ball and hide their heads tucked underneath. Some may poke with their harmless tail tip, like a worm snake. Many have a drab and dull-coloured back, but a very bright, contrastingly coloured underside (such as bright yellow, red, etc.) to startle predators by turning upside down and twitching. This aposematic colouration wards off would-be predators.

== Geographic range ==
Shield-tail snakes are found in Peninsular India and Sri Lanka. In India, their distribution is mainly along the hills of the Western Ghats, and a few species occur in other areas such as the Eastern Ghats and the hills of Central India. In Sri Lanka, they occur in many biotopes, including dry zones and the plains.

== Evolutionary significance ==
Because of their peculiar geographic distribution, with many hill ranges in South India and Sri Lanka each having an endemic shield-tail snake, they are thought to be analogous to Darwin's finches, in a broader sense – an evolutionary radiation. This is the only family of snakes endemic to South Asia. Genetic studies on this group have brought forth largely similar results as regards common ancestry and phenotypic diversification patterns. Molecular dating analysis has suggested that uropeltids originated around the Paleocene-Eocene boundary, splitting from its sister clade Cylindrophiidae + Anomochilidae around 56 MYA.

== Feeding ==
The diets of shield-tail snakes consist mostly of invertebrates, particularly earthworms, and many species have actually been observed in the wild by researchers to eat earthworms. Frank Wall, who dissected many species for analysing gut contents to study their diet, confirmed the presence of worms and mud.

== Reproduction ==
All members of the family Uropeltidae retain eggs that hatch within the body of the female (ovoviviparity).

== Genera ==
Genus	Taxon author	Species	Common name	Geographic range
Melanophidium	Günther, 1864	4		Western Ghats, India
Platyplectrurus	Günther, 1868	2		Southern Western Ghats, India
Pseudoplectrurus	G.A. Boulenger, 1890	1		Western Ghats
Plectrurus	A.H.A. Duméril, 1851	3		Western Ghats
Rhinophis	Hemprich, 1820	24		Sri Lanka and South India
Teretrurus	Beddome, 1886	8		Western Ghats
Uropeltis^{T}	Cuvier, 1829	26		Peninsular India

^{T} Type genus.

== See also ==
- List of uropeltid species and subspecies
