= Horton Plains National Park =

National park in Sri Lanka

- හෝර්ටන් තැන්න ජාතික උද්‍යානය
- IUCN category II (national park)
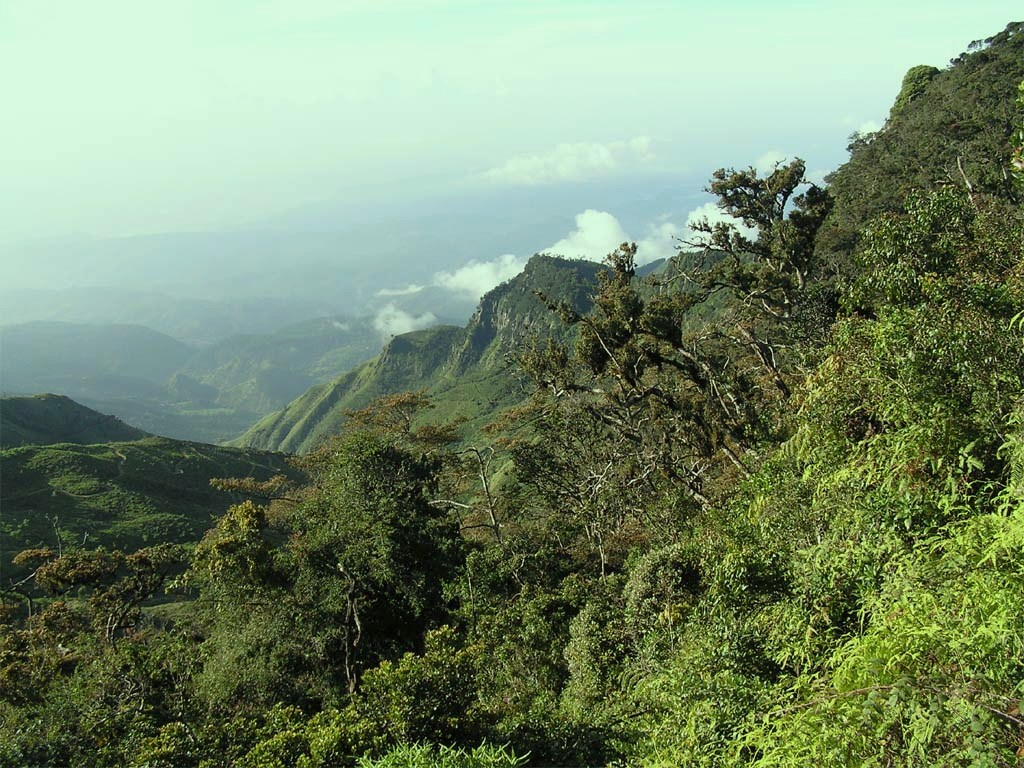
- World's End, a sheer precipice within the park

- Location within Sri Lanka
- Location: Central province, Sri Lanka
- Nearest city: Ohiya and Nuwara Eliya
- Coordinates: 6°48′N 80°48′E
- Area: 3,160 ha (12.2 sq mi)
- Established: 1969 (Nature reserve); 1988 (National park)
- Governing body: Department of Wildlife Conservation
- World Heritage site: 2010 (within the site Central Highlands of Sri Lanka)

Central Highlands of Sri Lanka
UNESCO World Heritage Site
- Interactive map of Central Highlands of Sri Lanka
- Criteria: Natural: ix, x
- Reference: 1203
- Inscription: 2010 (34th Session)
- Area: 56,844 ha (140,460 acres)
- Buffer zone: 72,645 ha (179,510 acres)

Horton Plains National Park (Sinhala: හෝර්ටන් තැන්න ජාතික උද්‍යානය, romanized: Hortan Thanna Jathika Udyanaya) is a national park in the central highlands of Sri Lanka that was designated in 1988. It encompasses an area of 31 km^{2} (12 sq mi) and borders Thotupalakanda Nature Reserve. It is located at an elevation of 2,100–2,300 m (6,900–7,500 ft) and encompasses montane grassland and cloud forest. It is rich in biodiversity and many species found here are endemic to the region.

The Horton Plains are the headwaters of three major Sri Lankan rivers, the Mahaweli, Kelani, and Walawe rivers. In Sinhala the plains are known as Maha Eliya Plains (මහ එළිය තැන්න). Stone tools dating back to Balangoda culture have been found here. The plains' vegetation is grasslands interspersed with montane forest and includes many endemic woody plants. Large herds of Sri Lankan sambar deer feature as typical mammals and the park is also an Important Bird Area with many species not only endemic to Sri Lanka but restricted to the Horton Plains. Forest dieback is one of the major threats to the park and some studies suggest that it is caused by a natural phenomenon.

The sheer precipice of World's End and Baker's Falls are among the attractions of the park.

== Physical features ==
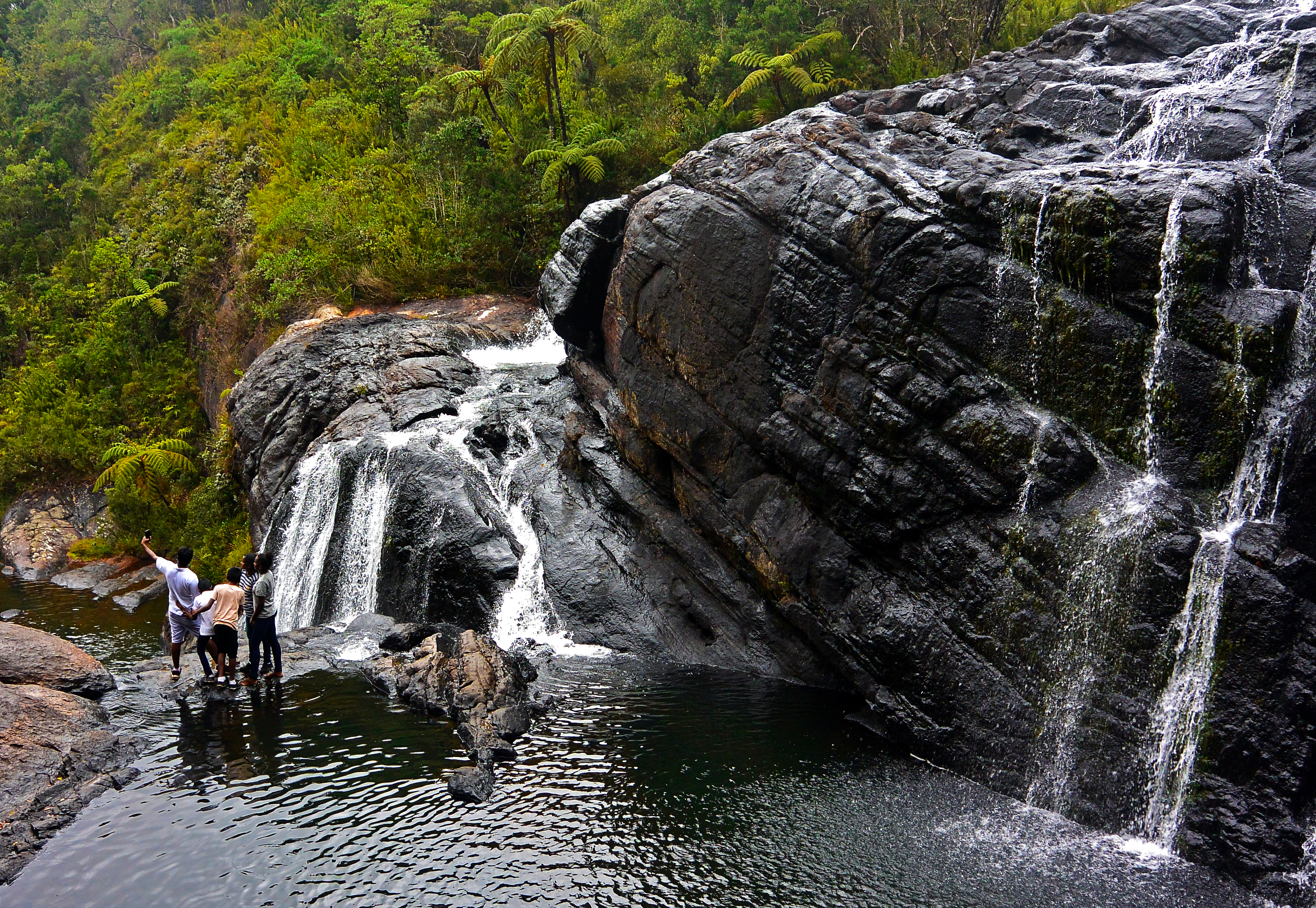
Waterfall in the national park

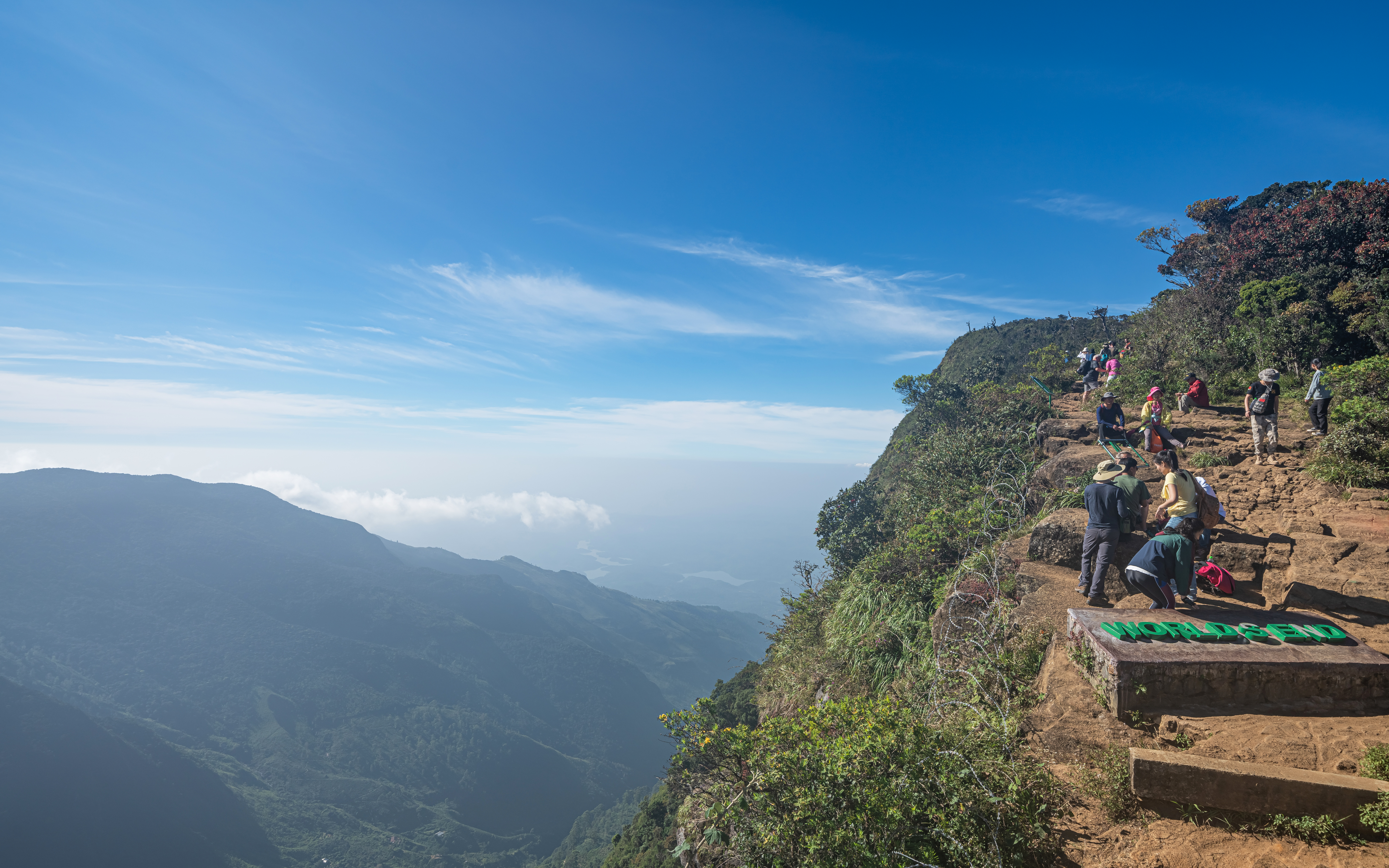
World's End within the park

Horton Plains is located on the southern plateau of the central highlands of Sri Lanka. The peaks of Kirigalpoththa (2,389 m (7,838 ft)) and Thotupola Kanda (2,357 m (7,733 ft)), the second and the third highest of Sri Lanka, are situated to the west and north respectively. The park's elevation ranges from 1,200–2,300 m (3,900–7,500 ft). The rocks in the park belong to the Archean age and to the high series of the Precambrian era and are made up of Khondalites, Charnockites and granitic gneisses. The soil type is of the red-yellow podsolic group and the surface layer is covered with decayed organic matter.

The mean annual rainfall is greater than 2,000 mm (79 in). Frequent cloud cover limits the amount of sunlight that is available to plants. The mean annual temperature is 13 °C (55 °F) but the temperature varies considerably during the course of a day, reaching as high as 27 °C (81 °F) during the daytime, and dipping as low as 5 °C (41 °F) at night. During the southwest monsoon season, the wind speed sometimes reaches gale force. Although some rain falls throughout the year, a dry season occurs from January–March. The ground frost is common in February. Mist can persist for most of the day during the wet season. The park has many pools and waterfalls, and Horton Plains is considered the most important drainage basin in Sri Lanka. The Horton Plains are the headwaters of the Mahaweli, Kelani, and Walawe rivers. The plains also feeds Belihul Oya, Agra Oya, Kiriketi Oya, Uma Oya, and Bogawantalawa Oya.

World's End is a sheer cliff with a 870 m (2,850 ft) drop. Baker's Falls, a waterfall formed by Belihul Oya, a tributary of the Walawe River is named after Sir Samuel Baker. The waterfall is 20 m (66 ft) high, and Slab Rock Falls is another well-known waterfall in the plains.

== History ==
The original name of the area was Maha Eliya Thenna (මහ එළිය තැන්න - "great open plain"). But in the British period the plains were renamed after Sir Robert Wilmot-Horton, the British governor of Ceylon from 1831 to 1837, who travelled to the area to meet the Ratemahatmaya of Sabaragamuwa in 1836, in 1834 by Lt William Fisher of the 78th Regiment and Lt. Albert Watson of the 58th Regiment, who 'discovered' the plateau. Stone tools dating back to Balangoda culture have been found here. The local population who resided in the lowlands ascended the mountains to mine gems, extract iron ore, construct an irrigational canal and fell trees for timber. A 6-metre (20 ft) pollen core extracted from a mire revealed that in the late quaternary period the area had a semi-arid climate and a species-restricted plant community.

Sir Joseph Dalton Hooker had advised the British Government "to leave all Montane Forests above 5000 ft. undisturbed" and an administrative order to this effect had been issued in 1873 that prevented clearing and felling of forests in the region. Horton Plains was designated as a wildlife sanctuary on 5 December 1969, and because of its biodiversity value, was elevated to a national park on 18 March 1988. The Peak Wilderness Sanctuary which lies in the west is contiguous with the park. The land area covered by Horton Plains is 3,160 hectares (12.2 mi^{2}). Horton Plains contains the most extensive area of cloud forest still existing in Sri Lanka. In July 2010, the Central Highlands of Sri Lanka which incorporates Horton Plains National Park, Peak Wilderness Sanctuary and Knuckles Mountain Range was inscribed on the World Heritage List.

== Flora ==
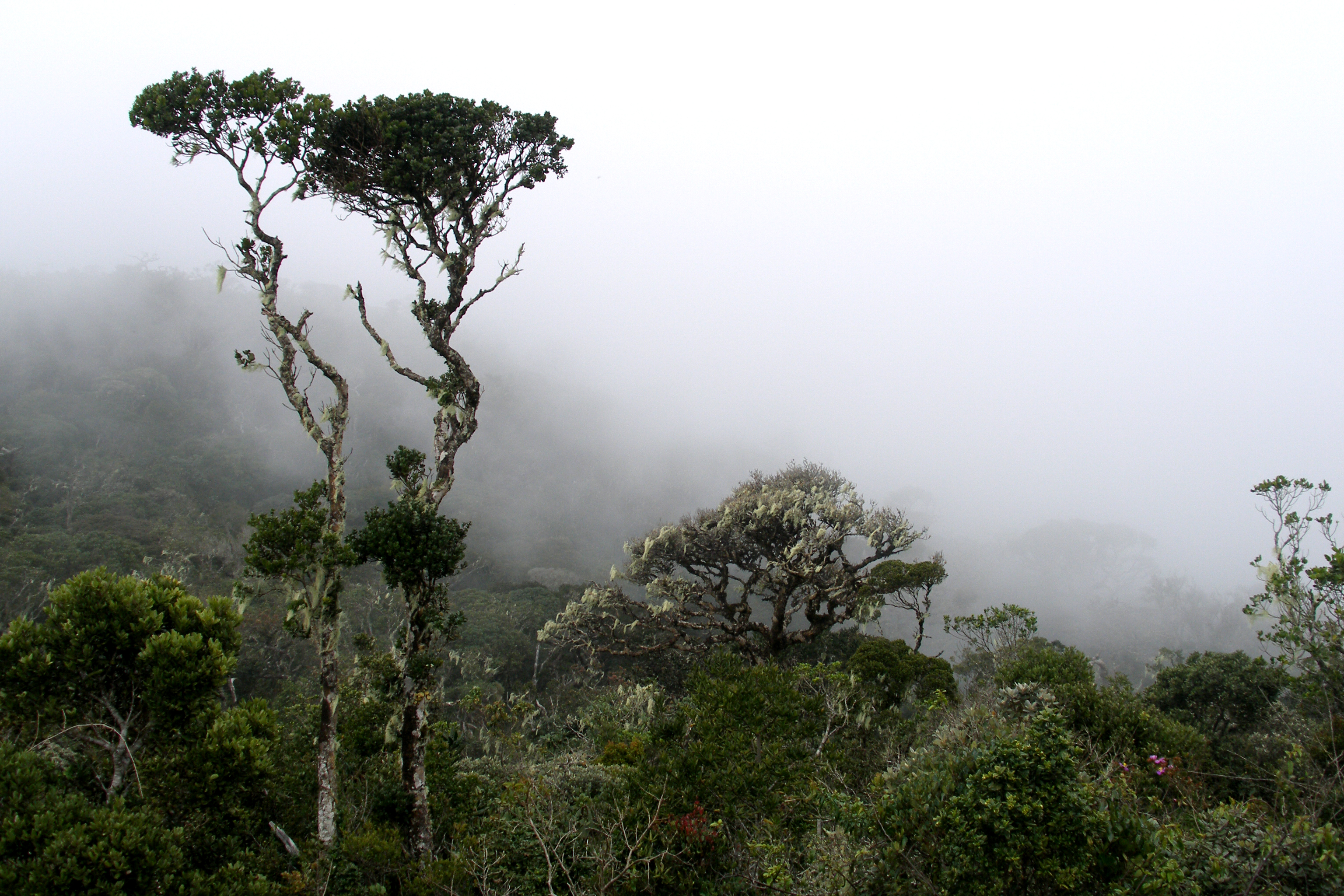
Rhododendron arboreum is the predominant tree species in the park

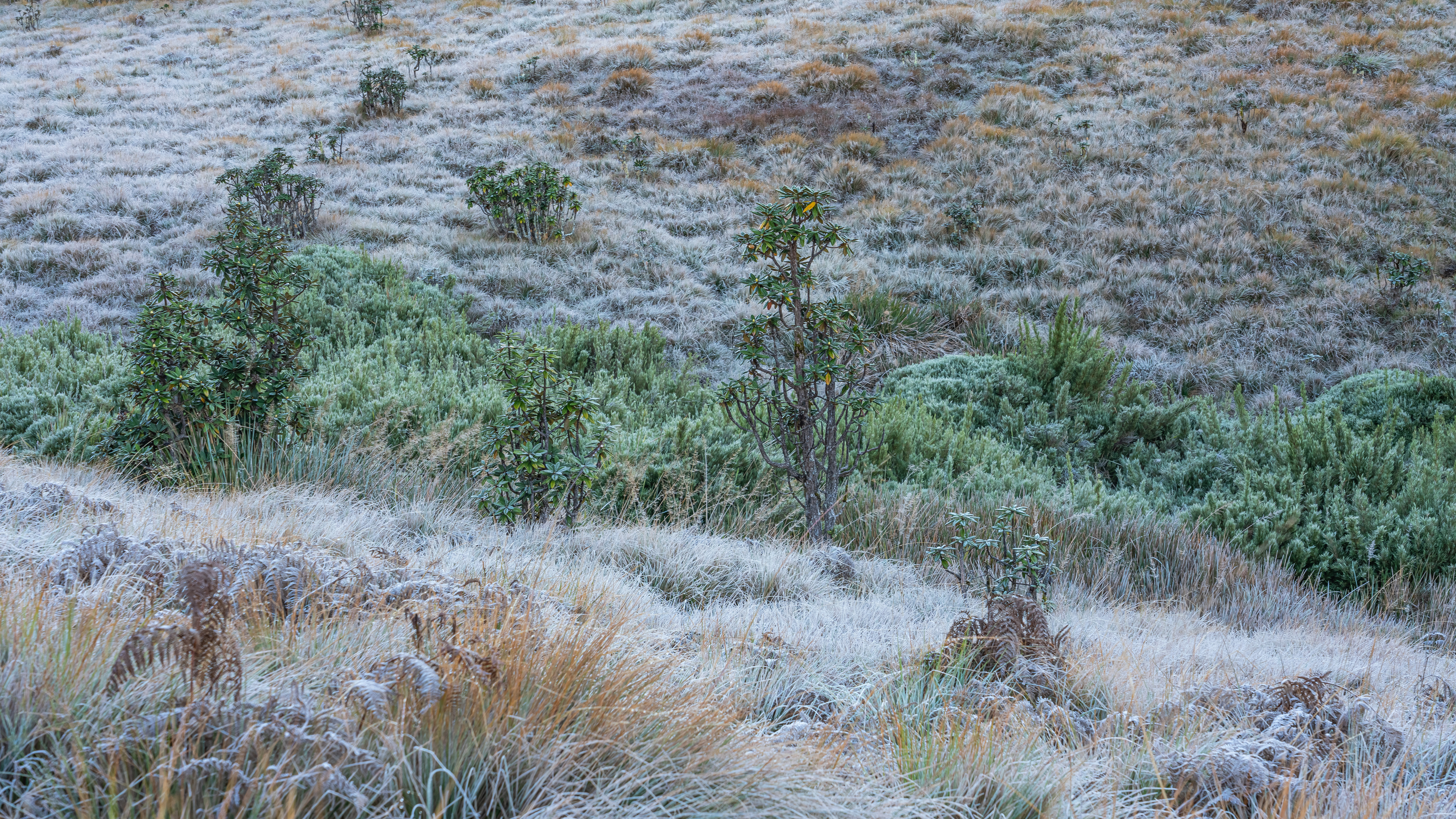
Frosty grasses in Horton Plains

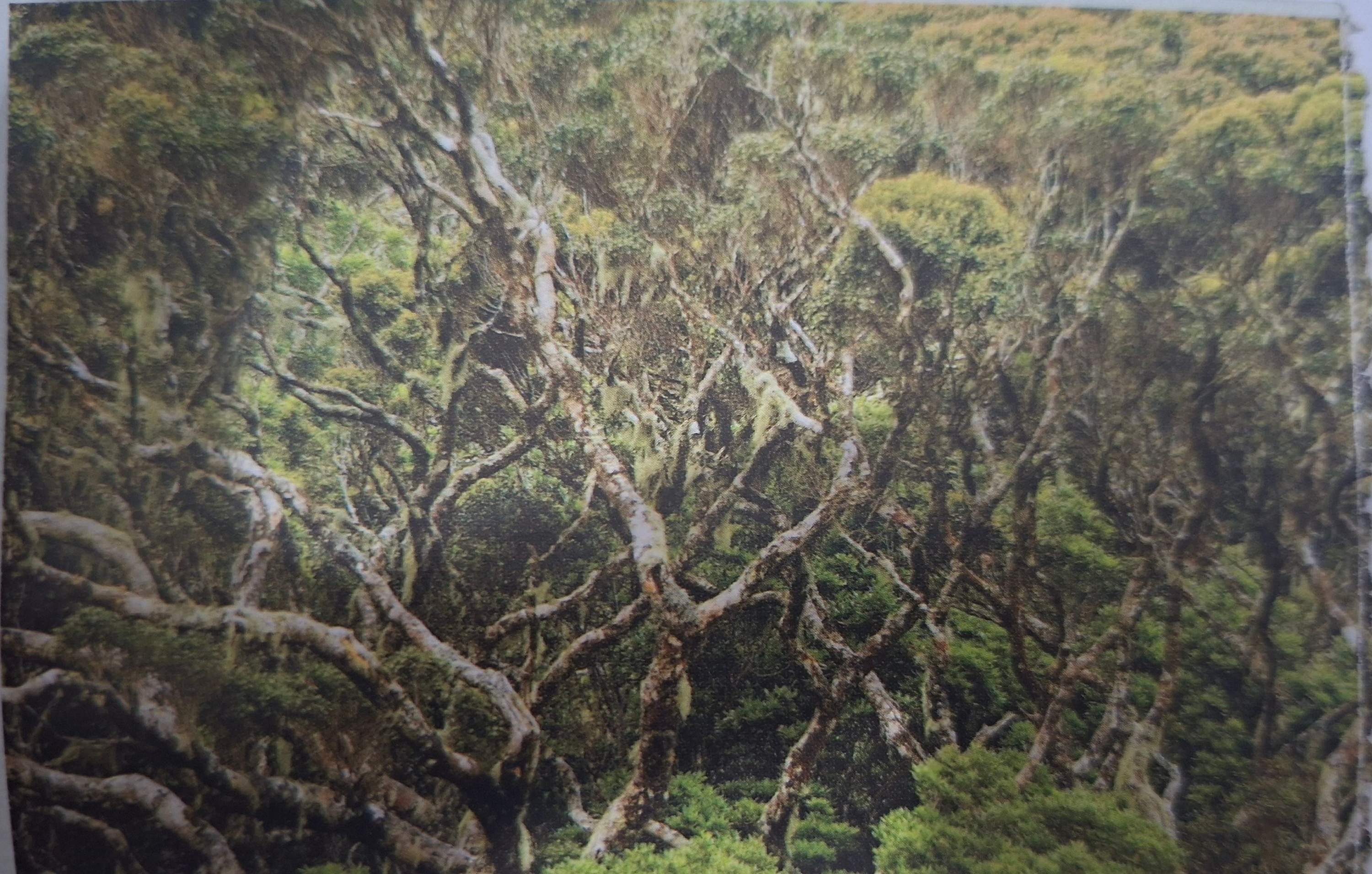
Mossy cloud forest canopy plants in Horton Plains National Park

The vegetation of the park is classified into two distinctive groups, 2,000 ha (7.7 mi^{2}) of wet patna (Sinhalese: patana, montane grasslands and shrublands) and 1,160 ha (4.5 mi^{2}) of subtropical montane evergreen forests. Nearly 750 species of plants belonging to 20 families have been recorded in the park. The forest canopy reaches the height of 20 m (66 ft) and features Calophyllum walkeri, forming communities with varieties of Myrtaceae species such as Syzygium rotundifolium, and S. sclerophyllum, and Lauraceae members including Litsea, Cinnamomum, and Actinodaphne speciosa. The undergrowth layer is characterised by Strobilanthes spp. The thickness of the Strobilanthes vegetation hinders the development of a herb layer. Dwarf bamboo species such Indocalamus and Ochlandra are also found in the undergrowth layer. Rhodomyrtus tomentosa bushes especially grow in forest margin and near the mountain peaks. Species such as Gordonia and Rhododendron arboreum have spread to Sri Lanka, along the Western Ghats of South India from the Himalayas and are now common. Nearly 54 woody plant species have been recorded from the park, of which 27 (50%) are endemic to Sri Lanka. Frequent fire and grazing characterises Plagioclimax communities of the grassland flora. Grasslands are dominated by Arundinella villosa and Chrysopogon zeylanicus. Waterlogged swamps or slow-moving streams are found in low-lying areas, and macrophytes such as Aponogeton jacobsenii, sedge species Isolopis fluitans and Utricularia spp. are found near the slow-moving streams. The bamboo Chimonobambusa densifolia thrive along the banks of the streams, and near the swampy areas grass species such as Juncus prismatocarpus, Garnotia mutica, Eriocaulon spp. and Exacum trinervium are common. Tussock grasses such as Chrysopogon zeylanicus and Cymbopogon confertiflorus are found in the wet hollows. Herbaceous flora of the grasslands include temperate species including Ranunculus, Pedicularis, Senecio, Gentiana and Alchemilla and also tropical species such as Eriocaulon and Ipsea speciosa (a rare endemic daffodil orchid). The most widespread boreal herbaceous plants of the park are Viola, Lobelia, Gaultheria, Fragaria, and Plantago.

Oberonia mahaeliyensis; an endemic orchid species only found in Horton Plains National Park

Tree trunks and branches are ornamented with many species of ferns, Lycopodium, lichens, and orchids. Old man's beard (Usnea barbata) hanging from branches adds to the beauty of the forests. About 16 of the orchid species are endemic. Other notable plants include shrubs such as Rhodomyrtus tomentosa, Gaultheria fragrantissima, herbs, Exacum trinervium, E. walkeri, Drosera indica, and tree ferns Cyathea spp. Anzia, a foliose lichen genus belonging to the family Parmeliaceae, which had not been recorded in Sri Lanka before, was discovered here in 2007. There are conflicting views on how the grasslands of the park came into being, whether man-made or natural. It is now believed that the grasslands on the dry slopes were created by forest clearance and fires while grasslands in low-lying areas were naturally created by wet conditions, frost and soil erosion.

Cyathea crinita; a native tree fern species in Horton Plains National Park

== Fauna ==
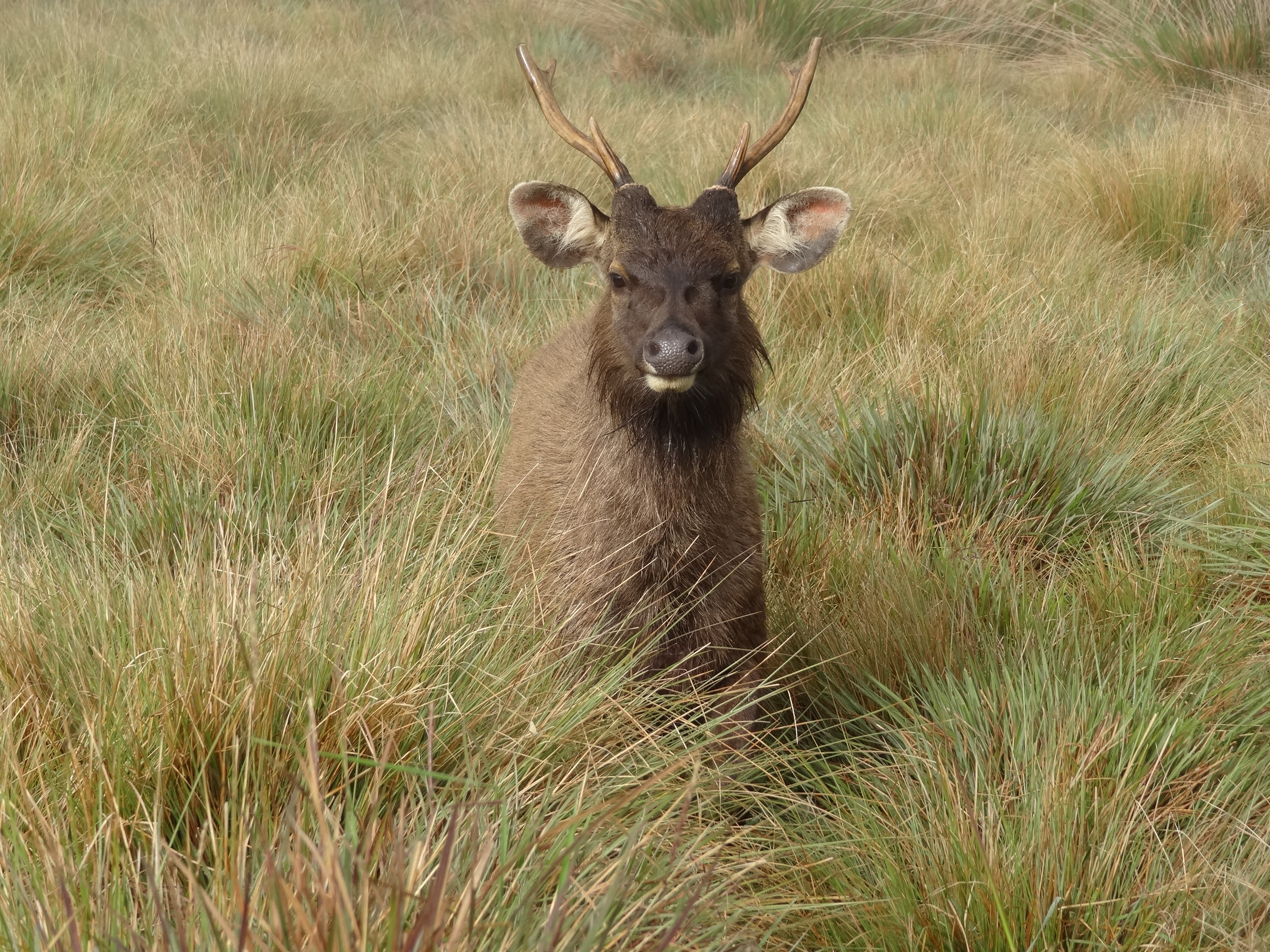
Sri Lankan sambar deer occur in large herds

The vertebrate fauna of the region includes 24 species of mammals, 87 species of birds, nine species of reptiles and eight species of amphibians. The Sri Lankan elephant disappeared from the region in the 1940s at the latest. At present, the largest and the most commonly seen mammal is the sambar deer. Some research findings estimate the population of sambar deer to be around 1500 to 2000, possibly more than the carrying capacity of the plains. Other mammal species found in the park include Kelaart's long-clawed shrews, toque macaques, purple-faced langurs, rusty-spotted cat, Sri Lankan leopards, wild boars, stripe-necked mongooses, Sri Lankan spotted chevrotains, Indian muntjacs, and grizzled giant squirrels. Fishing cats and European otters visit the wetlands of the park to prey on aquatic animals. A subspecies of red slender loris, the Horton Plains slender loris (Loris tardigradus nycticeboides formerly sometimes considered as Loris lydekkerianus nycticeboides) is found only in highlands of Sri Lanka and is considered one of the world's most endangered primates. In July 2010 a group of researchers from the Zoological Society of London was able to photograph the mammal for the first time.

In 2016, rusty-spotted cats (Prionailurus rubiginosus) were recorded in Horton Plains National Park for the first time, at elevations of 2,084–2,162 m (6,837–7,093 ft).

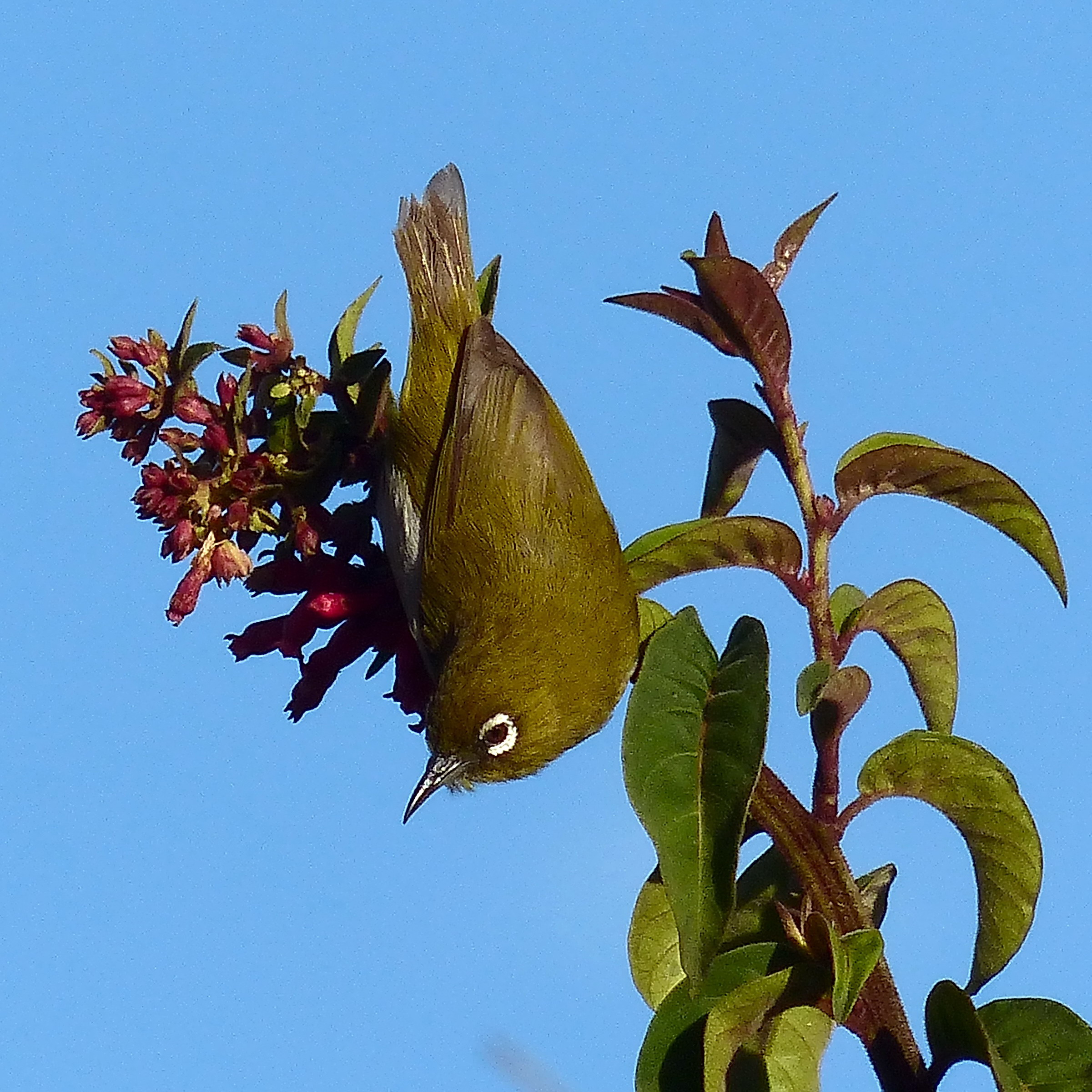
Sri Lanka white-eye

Along with Ohiya, Pattipola and Ambewela, Horton Plains forms one of the Important Bird Areas (IBAs) in Sri Lanka. Together with the adjacent Peak Wilderness Sanctuary, Horton Plains contains 21 bird species which occur only on Sri Lanka. Three, the dull-blue flycatcher, Sri Lanka white-eye, and Sri Lanka wood pigeon, occur only in Horton plains, while other endemic species include Sri Lanka blue magpie, Sri Lanka spurfowl, Sri Lanka junglefowl, yellow-fronted barbet, orange-billed babbler, Sri Lanka bush warbler, and Sri Lanka whistling-thrush. Many birds migrate here in winter including swiftlets, and alpine swift. Crested serpent eagle, mountain hawk-eagle, black-winged kite, and peregrine falcon are among the birds of prey found in Horton Plains. Harriers are among the migratory raptors. This is a key wildlife area. All six highland endemic birds are found here, including dull-blue flycatcher, Sri Lanka white-eye, Sri Lanka wood pigeon, and Sri Lanka bush warbler. Yellow-eared bulbul and black-throated munia are widespread throughout the highlands.

Calotes nigrilabris at Horton Plains National Park

Sri Lanka is considered a herpetological paradise in the world. Possibly about 15 amphibian species inhabit the park. Among them are Microhyla zeylanica, Uperodon palmatus, Zakerana greenii, Hydrophylax gracilis, Pseudophilautus alto, Pseudophilautus femoralis, Pseudophilautus frankenbergi, Pseudophilautus microtympanum, Pseudophilautus schmarda, and Taruga eques.

De Silva has observed five endemic reptiles from the plains. They are Calotes nigrilabris, Rhino-horned lizard, Cophotis ceylanica, Lankascincus taprobanensis and common rough-sided snake. Two fish species found in the park, common carp and rainbow trout; both are introduced species. Horton Plains is also home to many endemic crustaceans including Caridina singhalensis and Perbrinckia species. The endemic freshwater shrimp Caridina singhalensis is found only in streams that have a temperature of less than 15 degrees C and is now restricted to only a stretch of 10 km of one stream.

== Threats and conservation management ==
Horton Plains was a part of a large system of plains and forest cover that included Agra-Bopats, Moon Plains and Elk Plains. Between 1831 and 1948, it became a Sambar deer hunting ground. Elephants and Wild boars were also hunted to a lesser extent. During this period lower slopes were cleared initially for coffee and then for tea plantations. As a result, Horton Plains and Peak Wilderness became isolated from other forest and grassland areas. Potatoes were cultivated in the grasslands but planting ceased in 1977. After being declared a National Park, these areas were reinstated as grasslands. Tourism-related issues such as plant removal, littering, fires and noise pollution are major conservation issues. Gem mining, timber logging, the collection of plants for ornamental and medicinal purposes, encroachment, poaching and vehicle traffic are the other threats. The spread of invasive alien species such as gorse (Ulex europaeus), Mist Flower (Ageratina riparia), Crofton Weed (Ageratina adenophora), (Austroeupatorium), Blue Stars (Aristea ecklonii), brackens, and Pennisetum spp. threaten the native flora. The introduced rainbow trout may have affected endemic species of fish, amphibia and crustaceans.

Owing to the relatively small size of Horton Plains National Park, it was predicted that most male leopards have activity centres that were outside the park. Hence, continued protection of the national park and integrated management of landscapes outside of the national park is essential for the conservation of the species there.

Some sambar deer have died due to eating polythene litter that blocked their food passages, and visitors are banned from bringing polythene into the park. Sambar have benefited from the introduced Pennisetum grass species.

A recent threat, first reported in 1978, is forest dieback. In some areas, especially in the peripheral region, this has been severe with nearly a 50% in vegetation. Water deficiency has been attributed as the main cause of dieback as droughts are becoming more frequent. The regrowth of forest is hindered by frost which is increasingly severe. The forest dieback has affected 22 species of plants with Calophyllum walkeri being the most affected. A study has suggested that low calcium causes soil acidification and increased toxicity caused by metallic elements such as aluminium may be causing the dieback. Leaching of nutrients and the resulting imbalance in soil micronutrients may also be contributing to the dieback.
