= Baker's Falls =

Coordinates: 06°47′32″N 80°47′22″E

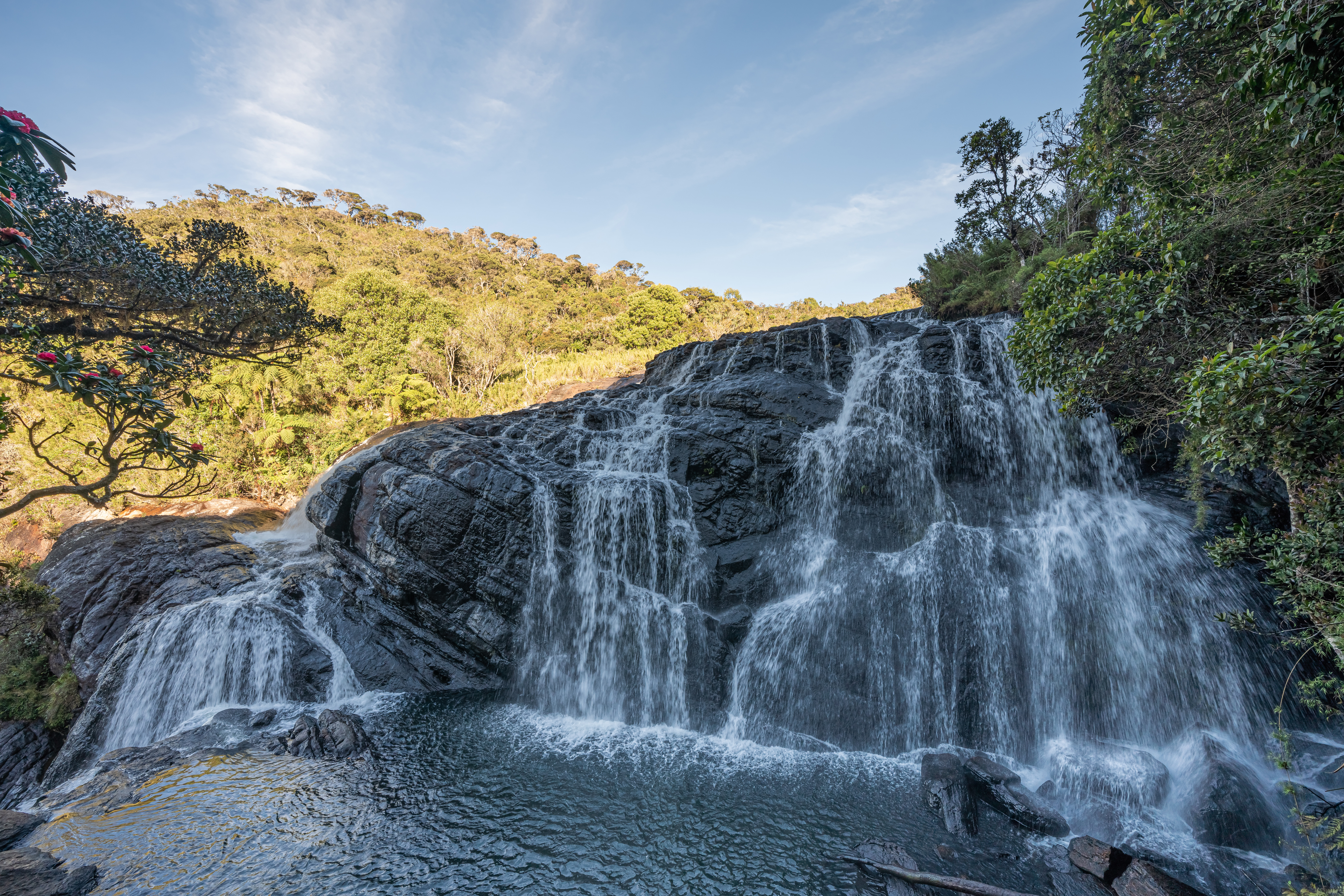
- Interactive map of Baker's Falls
- Location: Horton Plains National Park, Sri Lanka
- Type: Cascade
- Total height: 20 metres (66 ft)
- Number of drops: 2
- Watercourse: Belihul Oya

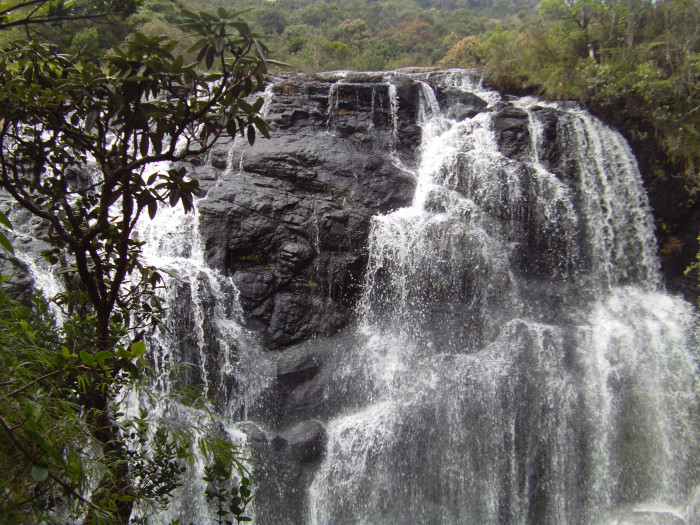
A closeup of the Baker's Falls

Baker's Falls (Sinhala: බේකර් ඇල්ල Bekar Ælla, originally known as Gonagala Ella) is a famous waterfall in Horton Plains National Park in the Nuwara Eliya District of Sri Lanka. Approximately 20 metres (66 ft) high, the waterfall is formed by the Belihul Oya, a major tributary of the Walawe River.

Baker's falls are 20 metres (66 ft) high and 25 m (82 ft) wide. The falls were named after British explorer and big game hunter Sir Samuel Baker, who is credited with discovering it in 1845 during his expeditions in the central highlands.

Baker’s Falls is characterised by its twin cascades and rocky surroundings. The waterfall flows forcefully into a rock pool, creating a loud, misty spray that enhances its scenic charm. The plunge pool beneath the falls is estimated to be around 12 m (39 ft) deep, and has a reputation for being dangerous. Several accidents have been reported here, so swimming is discouraged.

== Location and Access ==
The site is accessible from both the Ohiya (about 13.5 km (8.4 mi) away) and Pattipola (about 14 km (8.7 mi) away) railway stations.

Baker's Falls is located approximately 3 km (1.9 mi) from the main entrance to Horton Plains National Park. It can be reached by following the popular circular trail, which also leads to the World’s End escarpment. Visitors typically start the hike from the park entrance and, after passing Mini World’s End, arrive at the waterfall.

== Ecology ==
The trail to the waterfall is renowned for its natural beauty, with lush vegetation and frequent wildlife sightings, including sambar deer and rare bird species. Many Rhododendron, and other montane flora and fern bushes can be seen around the waterfall. The water from the falls is also considered exceptionally fresh and pure.

Baker’s Falls is located in the Horton Plains ecosystem, which is home to a variety of endemic flora and fauna. Several species of fish are said to be restricted to the area's streams and rivers due to ecological isolation. The trail to the falls provides opportunities to observe rare animals, making it a site of ecological and tourist significance.

== Tourism ==
Baker’s Falls is one of the main attractions in Horton Plains National Park, alongside World’s End, Mini World’s End, Kirigalpoththa and Thotupola Kanda mountains.

The hike to the falls is moderately challenging, especially in wet weather when the paths become slippery and tree roots cover much of the ground. Nevertheless, hikers are rewarded with panoramic views, biodiversity and scenic landscapes.

Visitors are advised to reach the falls before 15:00, as mist and fading light can obstruct visibility and the park will be closed. The trail and the surrounding rocks are popular resting spots for trekkers.

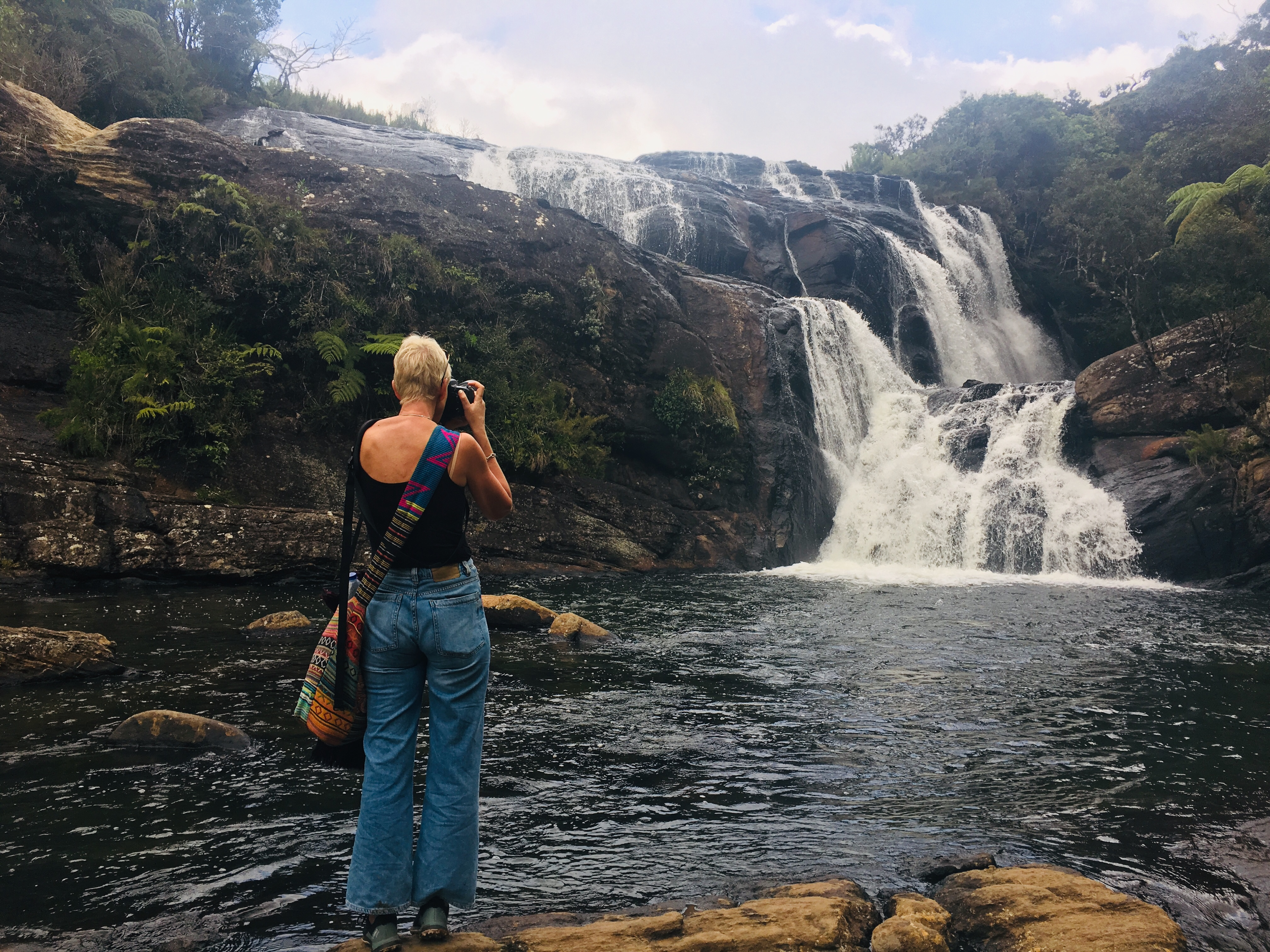
Baker's Falls view from a distance

Baker’s Falls is accessible all year round, although visitors should be prepared for frequent rainfall. While swimming in the plunge pool is discouraged due to its depth and strong currents, the site remains a popular destination for families and adventure seekers alike. The trail offers a moderately challenging trek which may be difficult for younger visitors or those with limited mobility. Guided tours are available, offering valuable insights into the unique flora, fauna and geology of Horton Plains. The best time to visit is between January and April, when the round-trip hike typically takes about two hours. Entry is included with a Horton Plains National Park ticket and there are vehicle parking facilities near the entrance.

== See also ==
- List of waterfalls
- List of waterfalls of Sri Lanka

== Citations ==
=== References ===
- Senanayake, Chanaka (2004). Sri Lankawe Diya Eli (in Sinhala) (1st ed.). Sooriya Publishers. ISBN 955-8892-06-8.
