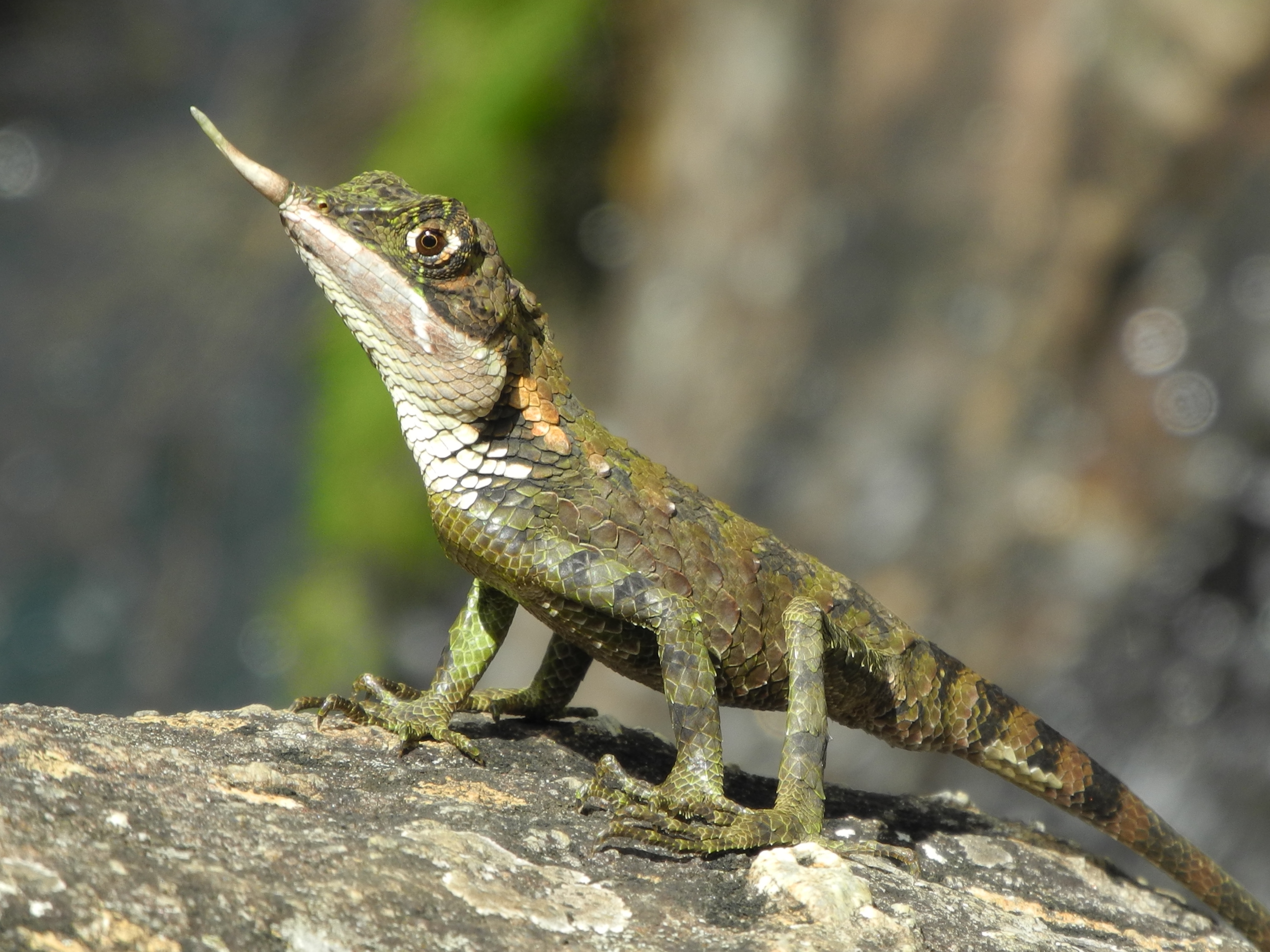
- Male
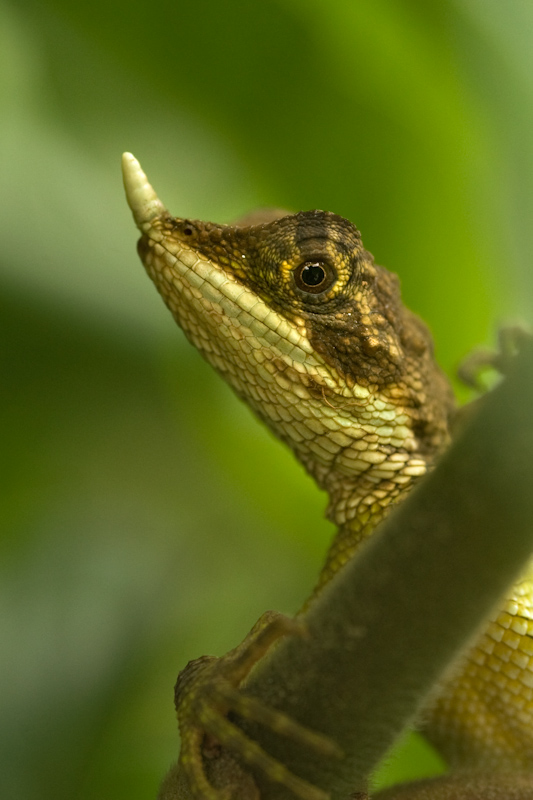
- Female

Conservation status
- CITES Appendix II

Scientific classification
- Kingdom: Animalia
- Phylum: Chordata
- Class: Reptilia
- Order: Squamata
- Suborder: Iguania
- Family: Agamidae
- Genus: Ceratophora
- Species: C. stoddartii

Binomial name
- Ceratophora stoddartii Gray, 1834

= Rhino-horned lizard =

Species of lizard

The rhino-horned lizard (Ceratophora stoddartii), also commonly known as Stoddart's unicorn lizard and the mountain horned agama, is a species of lizard in the family Agamidae. The species is endemic to Sri Lanka. It is called kagamuva angkatussa-කගමුව අං කටුස්සා in Sinhala.

== Etymology ==
The specific name, stoddartii, is in honor of Charles Stoddart, who was a British army officer and diplomat.

== Habitat and distribution ==
C. stoddartii is found widespread in montane forests of central Sri Lanka. Localities from which it has been recorded include Nuwara Eliya, Hakgala, Pattipola, Ohiya, Horton Plains National Park, Hewaheta, Dimbula, Agarapathana, Peak Wilderness Sanctuary, Galway's Land National Park, Knuckles, Galaha, Namunukula, Pidurutalagala, Haputale, Balangoda, Maratenna, Loolecondera, Moratiya state forest in Aranayake, Kegalla and Sandaraja Wana Arana in Kegalla.

== Description ==
The head of C. stoddartii is oval, and longer than wide. The rostral appendage is long, horn-like, about two thirds the length of the snout in males, but is reduced or even absent in females. The lamellae under the fourth toe number 23–27. The dorsum is brownish green or yellowish brown. The tail is marked with 10–16 dark brown crossbands. The venter is light brownish gray.

== Ecology ==
A slow moving, arboreal species, C. stoddartii is found on trees from 1 to 2 m (3.3 to 6.6 ft) above the ground. When threatened, it opens its mouth wide, revealing the bright orange lining of the oral cavity.

The presence of relatively larger trees as well as plants with low to medium levels of DBH is an important factor for C. stoddartii which spends most of its time resting vertically on a tree trunk or a branch. When weather conditions are too harsh they tend to take refuge inside the mosses that are abundant in the Cloud Forests. Tree barks with different shades (grays and browns) and mosaics of lichens & mosses provide the ideal background for C. stoddartii to merge with. Higher perch height of the adult males can be assigned as a feature of territorial defense and attracting the females.

The ground is less frequently used by adult C. stoddartii except for the occasional hunting sprints to catch the escaping prey. However, it has been observed on the ground feeding on caterpillars and even on earth worms (Pheretima taprobenia). When it descends to the ground it changes its green and brown colors into more shades of brown and becomes well camouflaged with the leaf-litter.

== Reproduction ==
C. stoddartii is oviparous. Egg laying takes place in July, and clutch size is about 2–5 eggs, each measuring 7.6-8.1 by 13.5–14.5 mm (.31 by .55 inch). The eggs are deposited in a hole, and hatch after 81–90 days. However, hatchlings have been founded in the wild also during colder months such as December and January. Hatchlings which emerge from eggs laid in humus or among leaf litter can be observed frequently occupying the ground where dead branch sticks and leaf litter well camouflaged them from the possible predators.

== See also ==
- Horton Plains National Park
