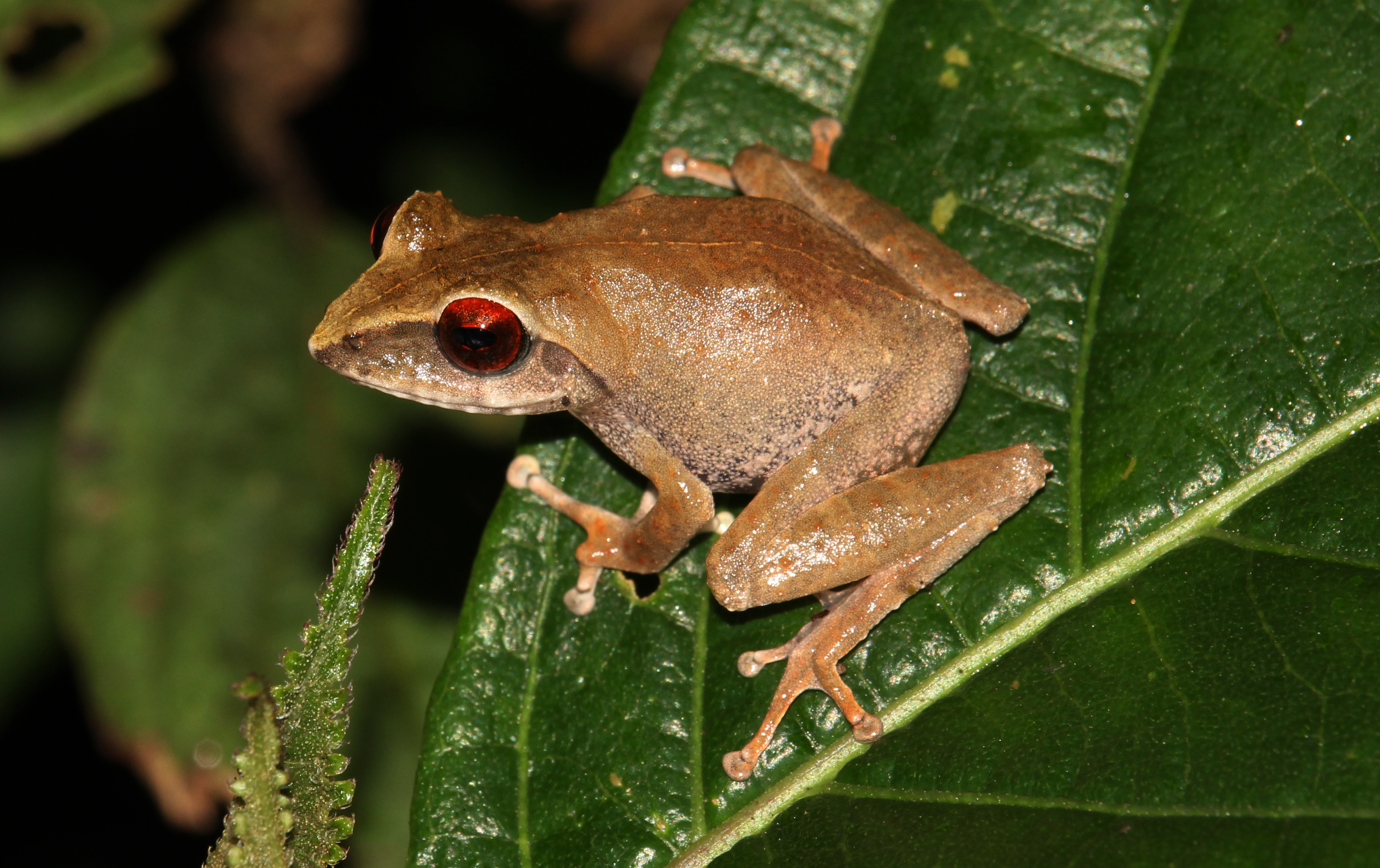

Conservation status
- Endangered (IUCN 3.1)

Scientific classification
- Kingdom: Animalia
- Phylum: Chordata
- Class: Amphibia
- Order: Anura
- Family: Rhacophoridae
- Genus: Pseudophilautus
- Species: P. alto

Binomial name
- Pseudophilautus alto (Manamendra-Arachchi & Pethiyagoda, 2004)

Synonyms
- Philautus alto Manamendra-Arachchi & Pethiyagoda, 2004

= Pseudophilautus alto =

Species of amphibian

Pseudophilautus alto (common name: Horton Plains shrub frog) is a species of frogs in the family Rhacophoridae. It is endemic to the Central Highlands of Sri Lanka and known from the Horton Plains and Pattipola.

Natural habitat of Pseudophilautus alto is tropical montane forest, but they can also be found in forest edge bordering tea plantations and anthropogenic habitats. They are typically found shrubs less than 0.3–2 metres above ground.

Pseudophilautus alto is threatened by habitat loss. It occurs within the Horton Plains National Park.
