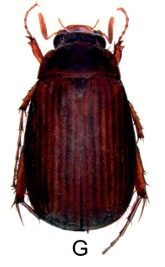

Scientific classification
- Kingdom: Animalia
- Phylum: Arthropoda
- Class: Insecta
- Order: Coleoptera
- Suborder: Polyphaga
- Infraorder: Scarabaeiformia
- Family: Scarabaeidae
- Genus: Maladera
- Species: M. hortonensis

Binomial name
- Maladera hortonensis Fabrizi & Ahrens, 2014

= Maladera hortonensis =

Species of beetle

Maladera hortonensis is a species of beetle of the family Scarabaeidae. It is found in Sri Lanka.

== Description ==
Adults reach a length of about 7.8–8.3 mm. They have a reddish brown, oval-oblong body, with yellowish brown antennae. The dorsal surface is dull and nearly glabrous, except for a few fine setae on the head, pronotum and elytra.

== Etymology ==
The species is named after its occurrence on the Horton Plains.
