= Walpolamulla =

- Village
- Interactive map of Walpolamulla
- Coordinates: 7°29′39.411″N 80°46′7.3524″E
- Country: Sri Lanka
- Province: Central Province
- District: Matale

Area
  - Total: 0.004 km^{2} (0.0015 sq mi)
  - Land: 0.004 km^{2} (0.0015 sq mi)

Population (2024)
  - Total: 2
- Time zone: UTC+5:30 (Sri Lanka Standard Time)

Walpolamulla is a village located within the Knuckles Mountain Range in the Central Province of Sri Lanka. It is considered one of the smallest and most secluded villages in Sri Lanka, nearly abandoned, with only remnants of homes and paddy fields remaining. Located near the Malkirigoda Gap, the village is only accessible by foot, being a 8 km trek from Etanwela, the last point with road access in the region. As of April 2024, the population is just two: a single married couple.

2008 saw the last major exodus from the village, with elephant incursions driving out all of its residents. The population at the time was 7, consisting of three families; as of 2024, two appear to have returned. Agriculture (historically, rice and betel nut) has been the mainstay in employment among residents. The village now serves as a paid campsite/overnight stay location as well.

== Notes ==
1.The total area of the village is estimated to be slightly lower than this value (an acre).

== See also ==
- List of towns in Central Province, Sri Lanka
