= Ceratophora ukuwelai =

Ukuwelas's rough horn lizard

Scientific classification
- Kingdom: Animalia
- Phylum: Chordata
- Class: Reptilia
- Order: Squamata
- Suborder: Iguania
- Family: Agamidae
- Genus: Ceratophora
- Species: C. ukuwelai

Binomial name
- Ceratophora ukuwelai Karunarathna, Poyarkov, Amarasinghe, Surasinghe, Bushuev, Madawala, Gorin, & De Silva, 2020

Species of lizard

Ceratophora ukuwelai, or Ukuwelas's rough-horn lizard, is a species of agamid lizard. It was described in 2020 and is named after the herpetologist Kanishka Ukuwela. Some taxonomists have posited that Ukuwelas' rough-horn lizard might be better treated as being part of the rough-nosed horned lizard. Ukuwelas' rough-horn lizard is endemic to Salgala Forest in Kegalle District, Sri Lanka. It is found in thick leaf litter on the forest floor in dense patches of forest. The study describing the species recommended that it be classified as being critically endangered due to the species' small range, low encounter rates within its known range, and ongoing habitat loss. Habitat loss and fragmentation are the greatest threats to the species. Other threats include roadkill, thermal stress due to highway asphalt, and invasive species.

== Taxonomy ==
Ceratophora ukuwelai was described by the herpetologist Suranjan Karunarathna and colleagues in 2020 on the basis of an adult female specimen collected from Salgala Forest in Kegalle District, Sri Lanka. It is named after the herpetologist Kanishka Ukuwela to honor his work studying and conserving the biodiversity of Sri Lanka. In English, the species is known as Ukuwelas' rough-horn lizard. The Sinhala common name for the species is Ukuwelage ralu-ang katussa.

Ukuwelas' rough-horn lizard is sister (most closely related) to the rough-nosed horned lizard. These two species are the most basal in the genus Ceratophora and are sister to a clade formed by all the other species in the genus. A 2021 study found significant genetic variation between different populations of the rough-nosed horned lizard and posited that the rough-nosed horned lizard and Ukuwelas' rough-horn lizard might be better treated as the same species.

== Description ==
Females have a snout–vent length of 36.4 to 37.9 mm. The upperside of the head, body and limbs are mostly grey-brown, while the tail is brown with dull serpentine markings. The chin, gular, and ventral scales are a mixture of dirty-white and red-brown. There is a white spot on the forehead, a Y-shaped brown marking on the area between the eyes, and a W-shaped pattern on the occiput. There are four grey diamond-shaped markings and black dots along the vertebrae. The labial scales are striped and there are two brown postorbital stripes past each eye. The upper side of both arms has a white ring. The back of the femur has a white line and the tibia has a white ring. The mouth is bluish-grey, the iris is copper-orange and the pupil is black. Males are slightly darker than females in colour. They also have a long complex rostral "horn" made of keeled acuminate scales.

== Distribution and habitat ==
Ukuwelas' rough-horn lizard is endemic to Salgala Forest in Kegalle District, Sri Lanka. The area, located at the northern edge of the wet bioclimatic zone, comprises lowland tropical rainforest at elevations of 120–325 m. The forest is separated from other forests by the Kelani and Maha rivers, smaller streams, and human agricultural cultivation. The species is known from four localities within Salgala forest and, like other Ceratophora lizards, seems to be a rather rare species. The species is found in thick leaf litter on the forest floor in dense patches of forest. Its microhabitat is poorly lit, with a light intensity of 455–687 Lux, moist, shaded, and warm, with an average temperature of 27.7–28.2 °C. It occurs alongside several other agamids, including the common green forest lizard, oriental garden lizard, brown-patched kangaroo lizard, and Sri Lankan agama.

== Conservation ==
Ukuwelas' rough-horn lizard has not yet been evaluated by the IUCN, but the study describing the species recommended that it be classified as being critically endangered due to the species' small range, low encounter rates within its known range, and ongoing habitat loss. The species has an estimated area of occupancy of 0.12 square kilometres and an estimated extent of occurrence of 0.26 square kilometres. The lowland rainforests of southwestern Sri Lanka, where the species lives, are extremely fragmented, and habitat loss and fragmentation are the greatest threats to the species. Montane forest fragments are frequently bordered by vegetable and tea plantations that use an extensive amount of pesticides that kill prey and bio-accumulate in lizards. Roadkill-induced mortality, thermal stress due to highway asphalt, and invasive species are other threats to the species.
