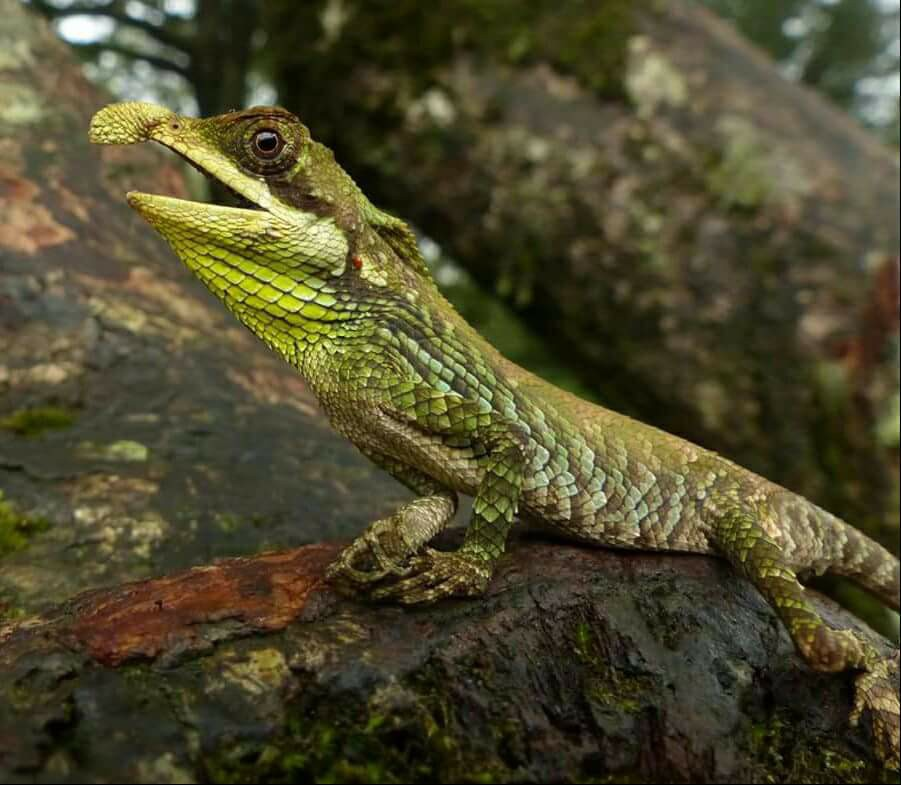

Conservation status
- Endangered (IUCN 2.3)
- CITES Appendix I

Scientific classification
- Kingdom: Animalia
- Phylum: Chordata
- Class: Reptilia
- Order: Squamata
- Suborder: Iguania
- Family: Agamidae
- Genus: Ceratophora
- Species: C. tennentii

Binomial name
- Ceratophora tennentii Günther, 1861

= Leaf-nosed lizard =

Species of lizard

Ceratophora tennentii, commonly known as the rhinoceros agama, horn-nosed lizard, and Tennent's leaf-nosed lizard, is a species of lizard in the family Agamidae. The species is endemic to Sri Lanka.In Sinhalese language, it is known as "Pethi An Katussa - පෙති අං කටුස්සා"

== Etymology ==
The generic name, Ceratophora, means horn bearer.

The specific name, tennentii, is in honour of Irish politician James Emerson Tennent, who was Colonial Secretary of Ceylon (1845–1850).

== Description ==
C. tennentii has a leaf-like appendage on the end of its nose. The species can reach lengths of over 8 inches (20 cm) including the tail. Males usually have more green in their coloration than females have, although they can change color to a reddish brown. Females usually have a shorter appendage on the nose. C. tennentii is not very agile and relies more on coloration than speed to avoid predators.

The head is oval, and longer than wide. The rostral appendage is fleshy, laterally compressed, leaf-like with a bluntly conical scale at the tip. The lamellae under fourth toe number 23-30.

The dorsum is reddish brown to olive green. The larger flank scales are more green. The gular region and sides of the neck have dark markings. The tail has 20 dark brown cross-bands. The venter is cream-coloured.

== Behaviour ==
C. tennentii is diurnal, and therefore is usually only active in the day. Very little is actually known about the behaviour of this unusual lizard.

== Habitat ==
C. tennentii is found in the wet tropical montane cloud forests of the Knuckles mountains in Sri Lanka at elevations of 760–1,220 m (2,490–4,000 ft). It has also been recorded in several other forest habitats.

== Diet ==
C. tennentii is reported to feed on insects and other small arthropods.

== Reproduction ==
C. tennentii lays eggs and is a sexually reproducing animal.

== Threats ==
Threats to C. tennentii include deforestation, pesticides, climate change, forest fires, and bioaccumulation. Much of its habitat has been cleared for illegal logging and the cardamom, coffee, tea, and rubber plantations over the past two centuries.

== Captivity ==
As of 2006, the leaf-nosed lizard is protected because of its endangered status, making its trade illegal.

== Conservation efforts ==
In 2000, areas above 1,067 m (3,501 ft) above sea level were protected and labeled as conservation forest. Cardamom cultivation had to be abandoned in this area. However, rather than natural regeneration, the cardamom range was taken over by invasive weeds such as mistflower (Eupatorium riparium) and lantana (Lantana camara). C. tennentii was placed on the endangered list by the IUCN in 2006.
