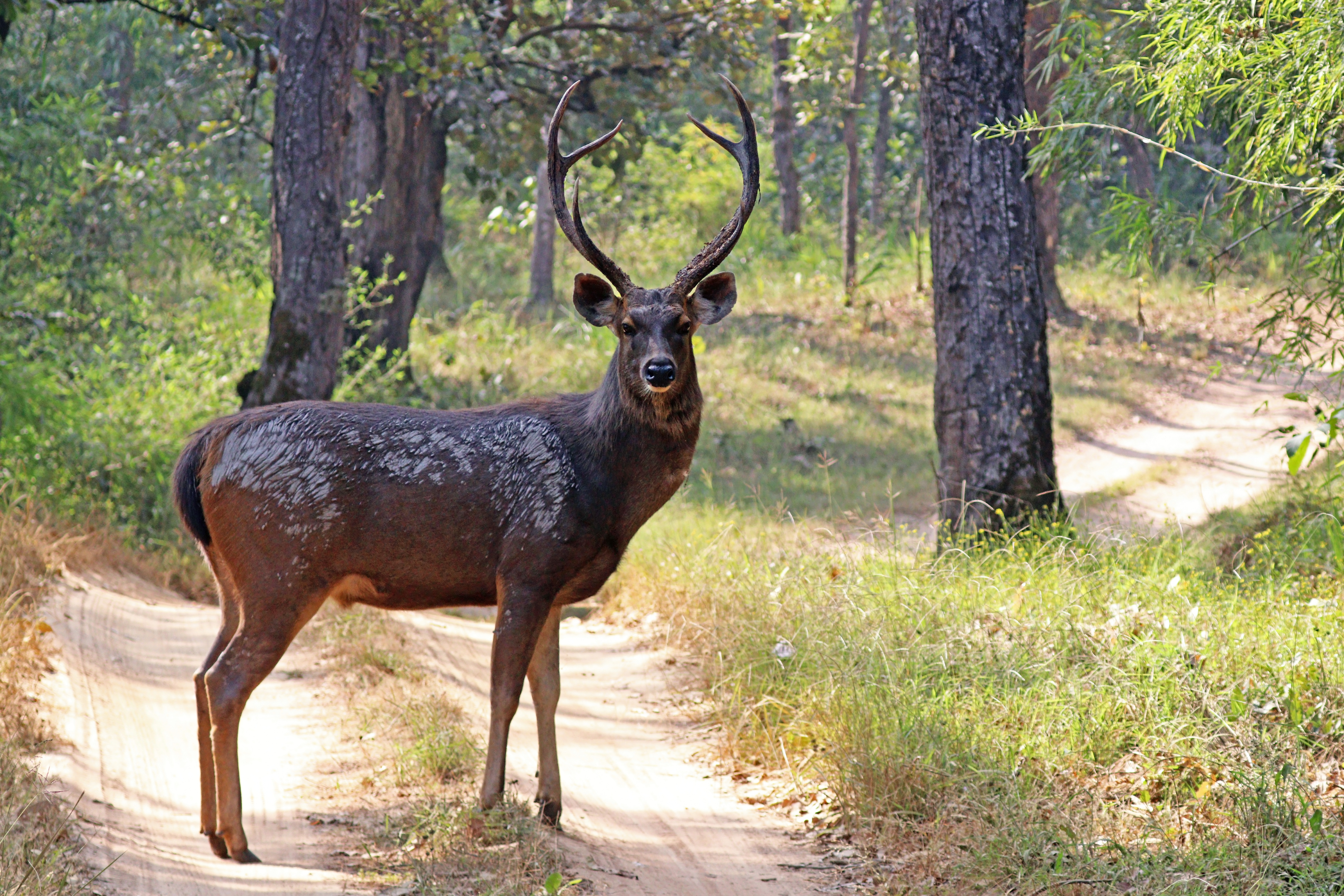
- Stag/male
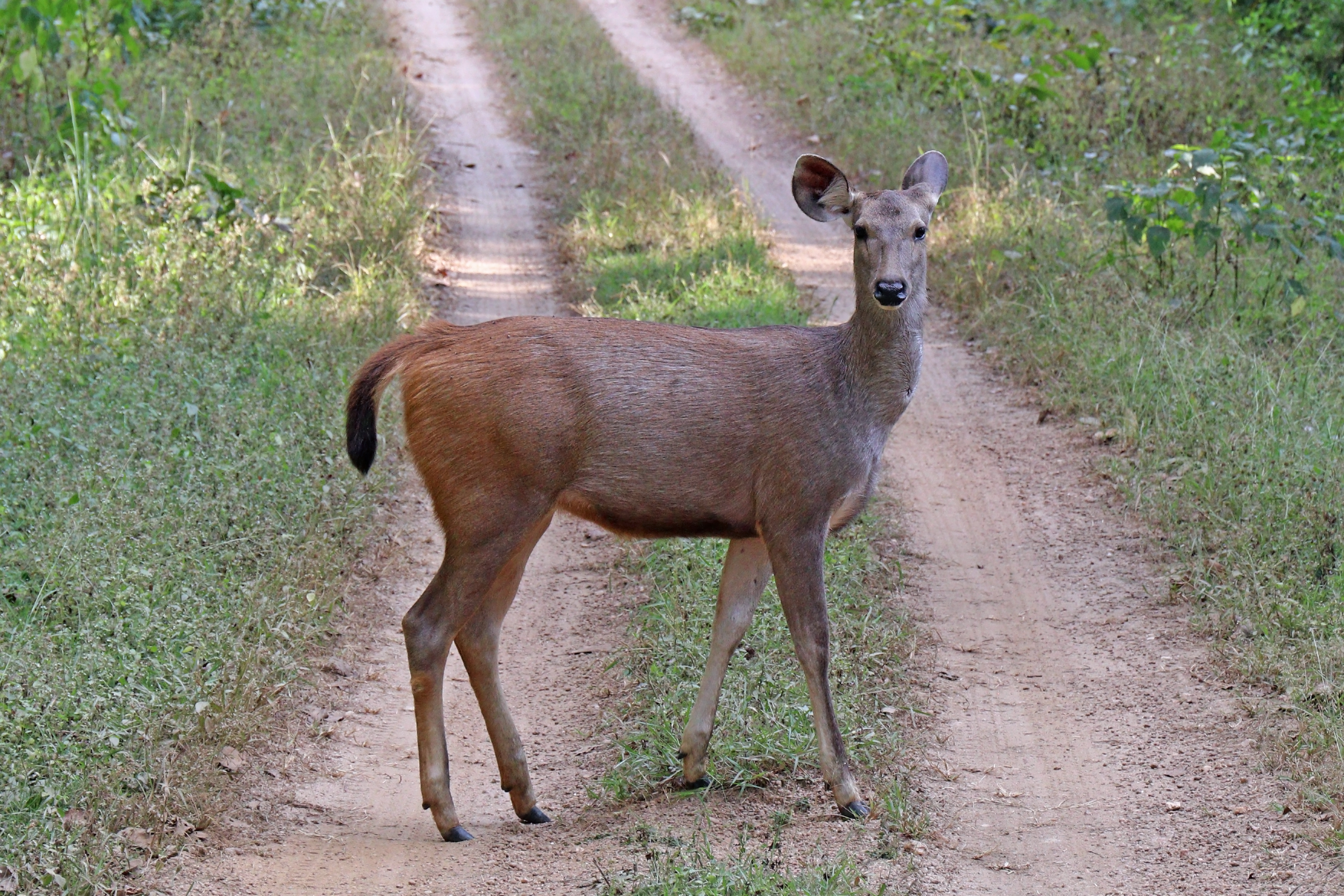
- Doe/female both in Kanha National Park, Madhya Pradesh, India

Scientific classification
- Kingdom: Animalia
- Phylum: Chordata
- Class: Mammalia
- Order: Artiodactyla
- Family: Cervidae
- Genus: Rusa
- Species: R. unicolor
- Subspecies: R. u. unicolor

Trinomial name
- Rusa unicolor unicolor (Kerr, 1792)

Synonyms
- Cervus unicolor unicolor

= Sri Lankan sambar deer =

Sambar

Subspecies of deer

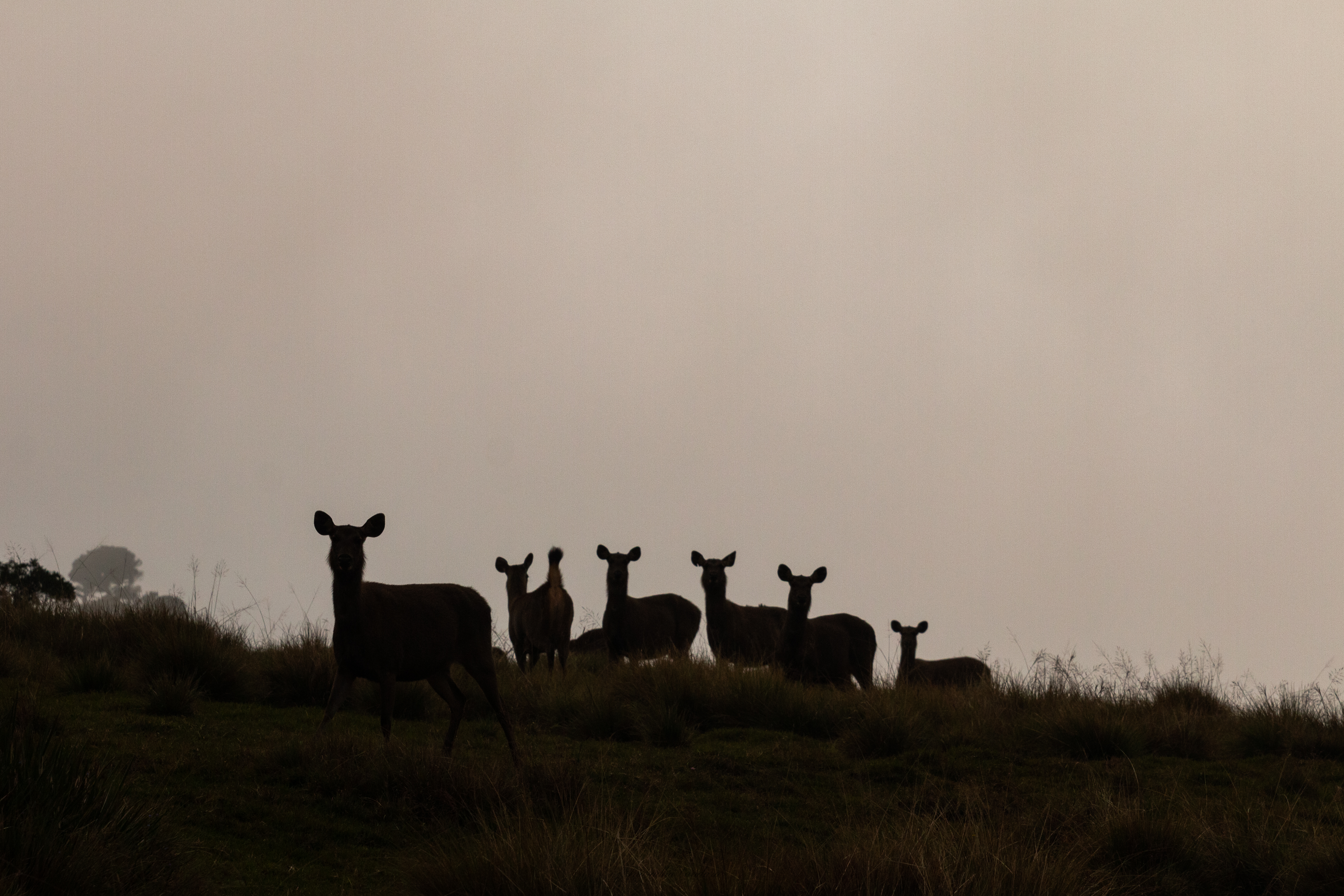
Horton Plains National Park, Sri Lanka

The Sri Lankan sambar or Indian sambar (Rusa unicolor unicolor), also known as ගෝනා (gōṇā) in Sinhala, is a subspecies of the sambar that lives in India and Sri Lanka. British explorers and planters referred to it, erroneously, as an elk, leading to place names such as Elk Plain.

== Description ==
This subspecies is the largest sambar subspecies and representative of the Rusa genus, with the largest antlers both in size and in body proportions. Large males weight up to 270–280 kg.

== Distribution and habitat ==
Sambar live in both lowland dry forests and mountain forests. Large herds of sambar roam the Horton Plains National Park, where it is the most common large mammal.The population of the sambar in Hortan Plains National Park is about 2000 individuals with the highest sambar population density in Asia.
