= Charles Stoddart =

British soldier and diplomat (1806–1842)

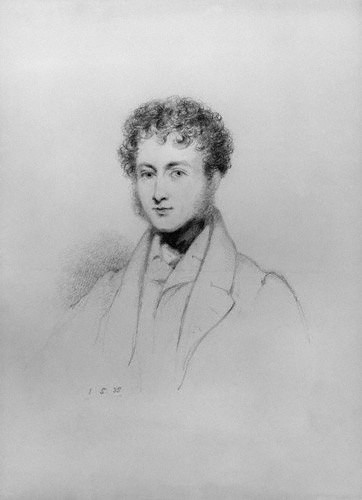
- Charles Stoddart
- Born: 23 July 1806; Ipswich
- Died: 17 June 1842 (aged 35); Bukhara
- Burial place: Bukhara

Colonel Charles Stoddart (23 July 1806 in Ipswich – June 1842 in Bukhara) was a British officer and diplomat. He was a famous British agent in Central Asia during the period of the Great Game.

Stoddart, the son of Major Stephen Stoddart (1763–1812), was educated at Norwich School and later commissioned into the Royal Staff Corps from Royal Military College, Sandhurst, in 1823.

Dispatched on a mission to persuade the Emir of Bukhara to free Russian slaves and sign a treaty of friendship with Britain, he was first arrested by the Emir Nasrullah Khan in 1838. In November 1841 Captain Arthur Conolly arrived in Bukhara with part of his remit to attempt to secure Stoddart's release. He was unsuccessful. Both men were executed on charges of spying for the British Empire on 24 June 1842.

In 1845, the Rev Joseph Wolff, who had undertaken an expedition to discover the two officers' fate and who barely escaped with his life, published an extensive account of his travels in Central Asia which made Conolly and Stoddart household names in Britain for years to come.

Stoddart is commemorated in the scientific name of a species of Sri Lankan lizard, Ceratophora stoddartii.
