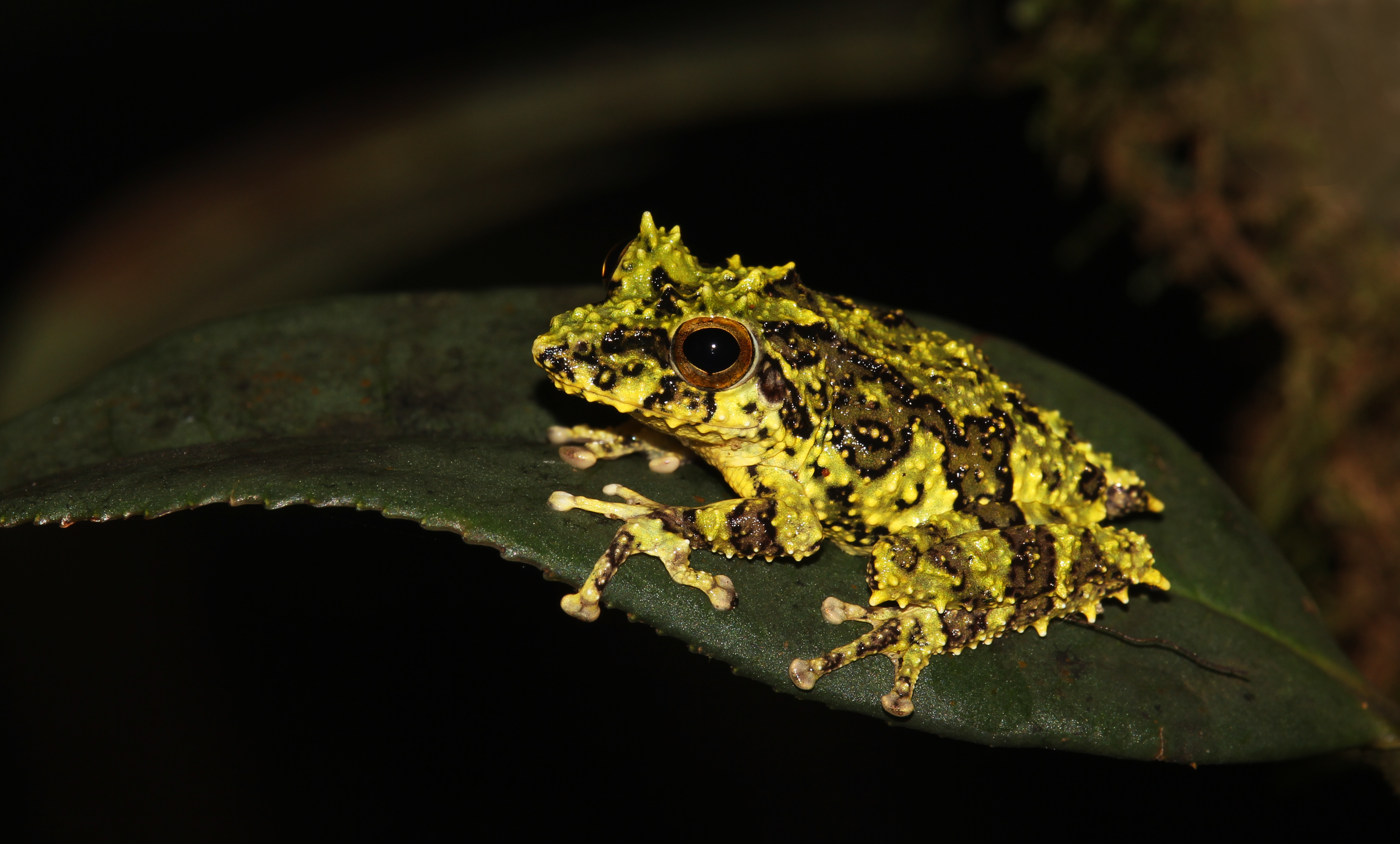

Conservation status
- Endangered (IUCN 3.1)

Scientific classification
- Kingdom: Animalia
- Phylum: Chordata
- Class: Amphibia
- Order: Anura
- Family: Rhacophoridae
- Genus: Pseudophilautus
- Species: P. schmarda

Binomial name
- Pseudophilautus schmarda (Kelaart, 1854)

Synonyms
- Polypedates (?) schmardanus Kelaart, 1854; Philautus schmarda (Kelaart, 1854); Ixalus poecilopleurus Lichtenstein and Martens, 1856

= Pseudophilautus schmarda =

Species of frog

Pseudophilautus schmarda is a species of frog in the family Rhacophoridae. It is endemic to the central hills of Sri Lanka and is known from the Peak Wilderness Sanctuary, Agra Bopath, Horton Plains, and Pedro. The specific name schmarda honours Ludwig Karl Schmarda, an Austrian physician, naturalist, and traveler. Common names Sri Lanka bug-eyed frog and Schmarda's shrub frog have been coined for it.

== Description ==
Adult males measure 18–27 mm (0.7–1.1 in) and adult females, based on only two specimens, 20–30 mm (0.8–1.2 in) in snout–vent length. The body is stout. The snout is obtusely pointed. The tympanum is visible and the supratympanic fold is prominent. The fingers have lateral dermal fringes and only rudimentary webbing, whereas the toes are medially webbed. Skin of the upper side is rough with glandular folds, glandular warts, and horn-like spinules. The upper parts are dark green and red-brown; the flanks grade from yellow through dark brown to light brown. The chest and abdomen are yellow and bear bright-yellow spots.

== Habitat and conservation ==
Pseudophilautus schmarda occurs primarily in cloud forests at elevations of 810–2,300 m (2,660–7,550 ft) above sea level, but has also been recorded in pine and abandoned tea plantations. While juveniles have been observed on the forest floor, adults occur in the understorey vegetation some 1–2 m (3–7 ft) above the ground. The eggs are deposited in a deep hole that the female excavates in the forest floor.

Pseudophilautus schmarda is a common frog. While much of its range lies within protected areas, habitat deterioration is taking place because of illegal firewood collection, clear-cutting for timber, and conversion to agricultural land such as tea plantations. Additional potential threats are forest fires and agro-chemical pollution.
