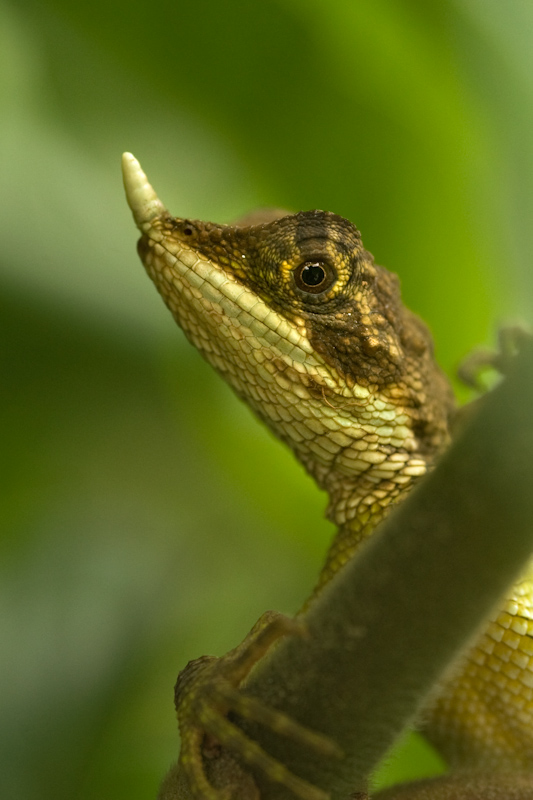

Scientific classification
- Kingdom: Animalia
- Phylum: Chordata
- Class: Reptilia
- Order: Squamata
- Suborder: Iguania
- Family: Agamidae
- Subfamily: Draconinae
- Genus: Ceratophora; Gray, 1835

Species
- See text

= Ceratophora =

Genus of lizards

Ceratophora is a genus of agamid lizards found in Sri Lanka. The male has a horn on its snout.

== Description ==
The tympanum is hidden, and the body is more or less laterally compressed, and covered with unequal scales. No dorsal crest is present; and a nuchal crest can be present or absent. No gular sac or gular fold is present. A large rostral appendage occurs, at least in the males. No femoral or preanal pores are found.

== Species ==
The following species are recognized as being valid.

Image	Scientific name	Common name	Distribution
	Ceratophora aspera Günther, 1864	rough-nosed horned lizard, Sri Lanka horned agama	Sri Lanka
	Ceratophora erdeleni Pethiyagoda & Manamendra-Arachchi, 1998		Sri Lanka
	Ceratophora karu Pethiyagoda & Manamendra-Arachchi, 1998		Sri Lanka
	Ceratophora stoddartii Gray, 1834	rhino-horned lizard, Stoddart's unicorn lizard, the mountain horned agama	Sri Lanka.
	Ceratophora tennentii Günther, 1861	rhinoceros agama, horn-nosed lizard, leaf-nosed lizard, Tennent's leaf-nosed lizard	Sri Lanka.
	Ceratophora ukuwelai Karunarathna, Poyarkov, Amarasinghe, Surasinghe, Bushuev, Madawala, Gorin, & De Silva, 2020	Ukuwelas's rough-horn lizard	Sri Lanka

=== Key to selected species ===
- a. Gular scales larger than the ventrals, smooth; lateral scales large, unequal; rostral appendage scaleless — C. stoddartii
- b. Gular scales larger than the ventrals, feebly keeled; lateral scales large, equal; rostral appendage scaly — C. tennentii
- c. Gular scales smaller than the ventrals, strongly keeled; lateral scales small; rostral appendage scaly — C. aspera
