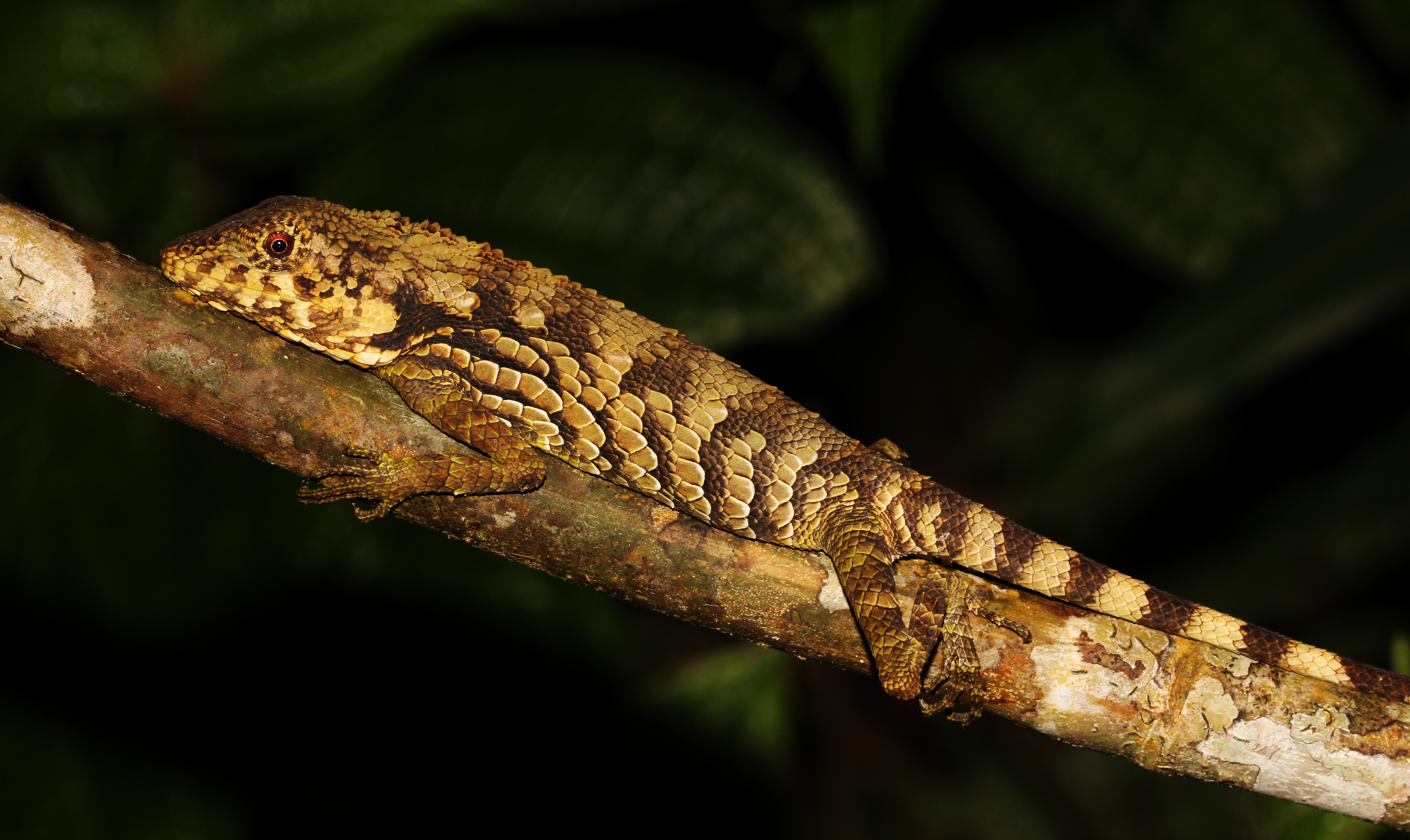

Conservation status
- Critically Endangered (IUCN 3.1)
- CITES Appendix I

Scientific classification
- Kingdom: Animalia
- Phylum: Chordata
- Class: Reptilia
- Order: Squamata
- Suborder: Iguania
- Family: Agamidae
- Genus: Ceratophora
- Species: C. erdeleni

Binomial name
- Ceratophora erdeleni Pethiyagoda & Manamendra-Arachchi, 1998

= Ceratophora erdeleni =

Species of lizard

Ceratophora erdeleni, also known commonly as Erdelen's horned lizard or Erdelen's horn lizard, is a species of lizard in the family Agamidae. The species is endemic to Sri Lanka. It has only a rudimentary "horn", that is occasionally missing altogether.

== Etymology ==
The specific name, erdeleni, is in honor of German biologist Walter R. Erdelen.

== Geographic range ==
C. erdeleni is known only from Morningside Forest Reserve in Sri Lanka at an elevation of 1,060 m (3,480 ft).

== Description ==
The head of C. erdeleni is oval, and longer than wide. The rostral appendage is oval and rudimentary (less than 18% snout length), and occasionally missing in both sexes. The tympanum is hidden under the skin. A weak dorso-nuchal crest is confined to the neck region. Lamellae under fourth toe are 24–28 in number. The dorsum is yellow, light brown, or reddish brown in color, with 17 broad dark brown crossbands on the body and tail that are separated by light narrow interspaces. The venter is yellowish green. Juveniles are green with black transverse bands.

== Habitat and behavior ==
C. erdeleni inhabits rainforests in the midhills and is arboreal and diurnal.

== Reproduction ==
An adult female of C. erdeleni may produce 2 to 3 eggs at a time, each egg measuring 7.2 mm × 13.7 mm (0.28 in × 0.54 in).
