= Ceratophora karu =

Conservation status
- CITES Appendix I
- Critically Endangered (IUCN 3.1)

Scientific classification
- Kingdom: Animalia
- Phylum: Chordata
- Class: Reptilia
- Order: Squamata
- Suborder: Iguania
- Family: Agamidae
- Genus: Ceratophora
- Species: C. karu

Binomial name
- Ceratophora karu Pethiyagoda & Manamendra-Arachchi, 1998

Species of lizard

Ceratophora karu, also known commonly as Karu's horned lizard or Karunaratne's horn lizard, is a species of lizard in the family Agamidae. The species is endemic to Sri Lanka.

== Etymology ==
The specific name, karu, is in honor of Sri Lankan zoologist G. Punchi Banda "Karu" Karunaratne (1930–1996).

== Geographic range ==
C. karu is known only from Morning Side Forest Reserve and three nearby unprotected localities in Sri Lanka.

== Habitat ==
The preferred natural habitat of C. karu is well-shaded forest at elevations of 1,000–1,100 metres (3,300–3,600 ft), but it has also been found in cardamom plantations with forest overstory.

== Description ==
The head of C. karu is oval, and is longer than wide. The rostral appendage comprises more scales than the rostral scale alone. The scales are triangular, smooth or weakly keeled. The length of the rostral appendage is less than eye-nostril distance. There are prominent superciliary scales. There is a backward-pointing V-shaped ridge at the back of the forehead. The dorsal scales are larger than the scales on the flanks. The lamellae under the fourth toe number 14–17.

The dorsum is dark black-brown, and the flanks are brown or olive-green. Some specimens have bright orange-red patches on the supralabials. The throat and venter are buff or dirty white to yellowish-brown with small black patches.

== Reproduction ==
C. karu is oviparous. Two eggs are laid at a time, each measuring 8.6 mm x 5.0 mm (0.34 in x 0.2 in).
