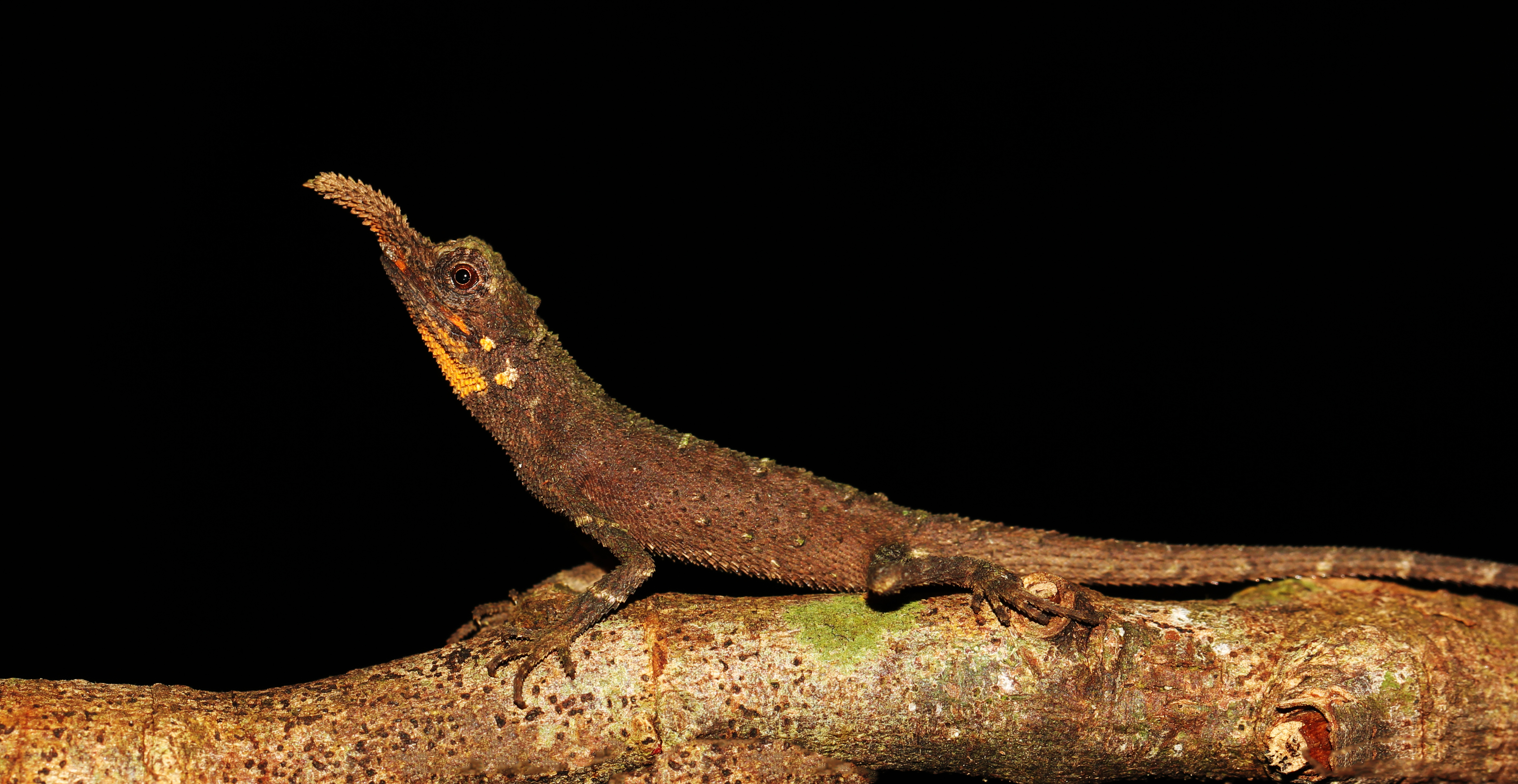

Conservation status
- Endangered (IUCN 3.1)
- CITES Appendix II

Scientific classification
- Kingdom: Animalia
- Phylum: Chordata
- Class: Reptilia
- Order: Squamata
- Suborder: Iguania
- Family: Agamidae
- Genus: Ceratophora
- Species: C. aspera

Binomial name
- Ceratophora aspera Günther, 1864
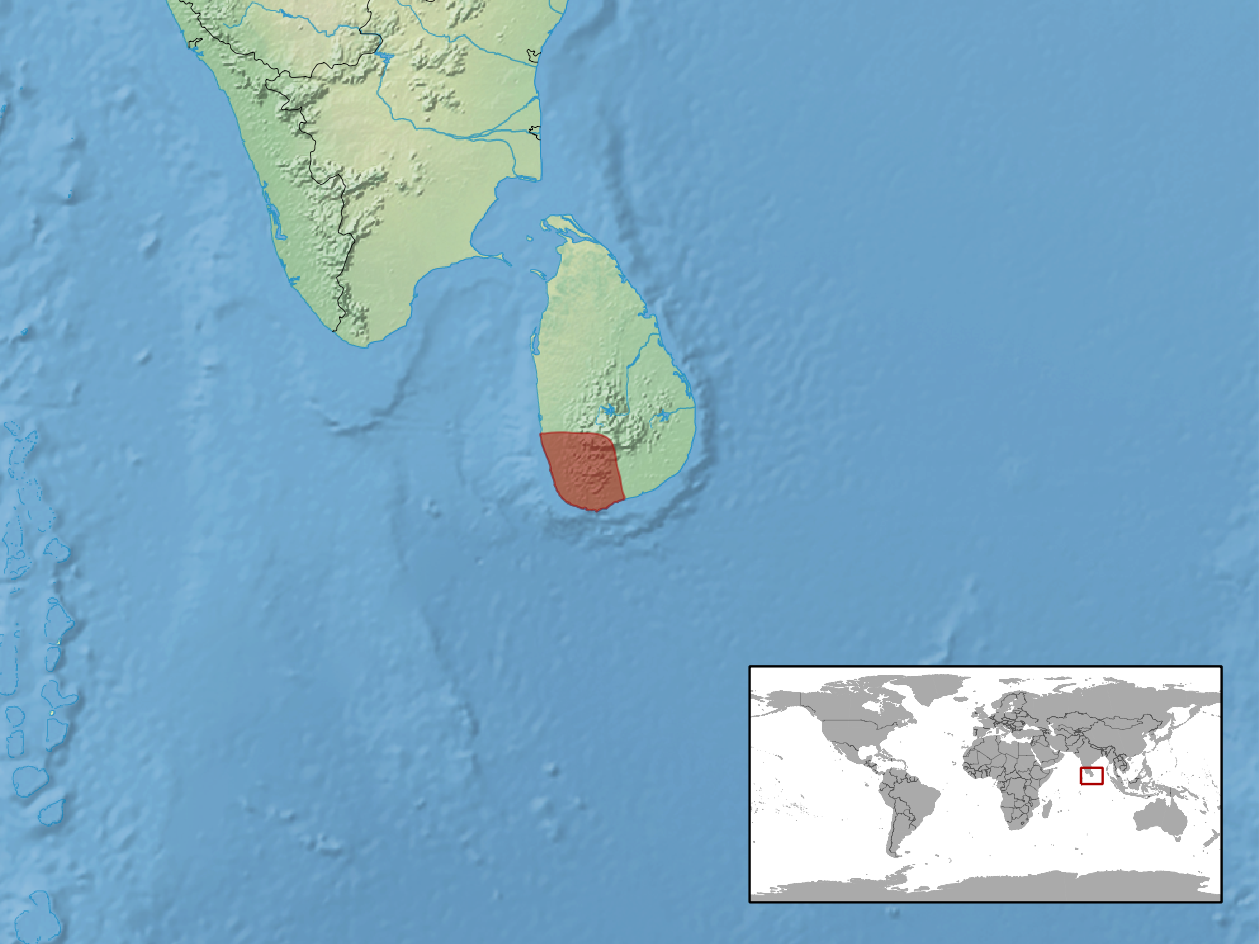

= Rough-nosed horned lizard =

Species of lizard

The rough-nosed horned lizard or Sri Lanka horned agama (Ceratophora aspera) is an Agamid lizard from Sri Lanka in lowland dipterocarp forests and secondary forests in the wet zone. It is distinguished from all the other Ceratophora species by the presence of a complex rostral appendage, comprising more scales than rostral scale alone. The lateral body scales are small and more or less regular shape.In Sinhalese language it is known as "Ralu An Katussa - රළු අං කටුස්සා" and "Punchi An Katussa - පුංචි අං කටුස්සා"

== Description ==
The rough-nosed horned lizard has an X-shaped dorsal ridge at back of its head. Tympanum hidden under the skin. A weak dorso-nuchal crest confined to the neck region. Gular fold absent. Body slightly compressed. Lamellae under fourth toe counts 11-14. Males are dark brown or brick-red dorsally and on the flanks. Females may be similar to males in coloration and can be lighter, with some individuals have four diamond-shaped marks and black spots or longitudinal lines on dorsum.

== Natural history ==
A terrestrial species, it is found on leaf litter in well-shaded forests, usually in pairs. Two soft-shelled eggs are laid.

== Habitat & distribution ==
A ground-dwelling species and lives in pairs. Restricted to the moist lowlands and submontane dipterocarp forests region in southern Sri Lanka, including Hiniduma, Kottawa below 900m of elevation.

== Reproduction ==
2 eggs are laid at a time.
