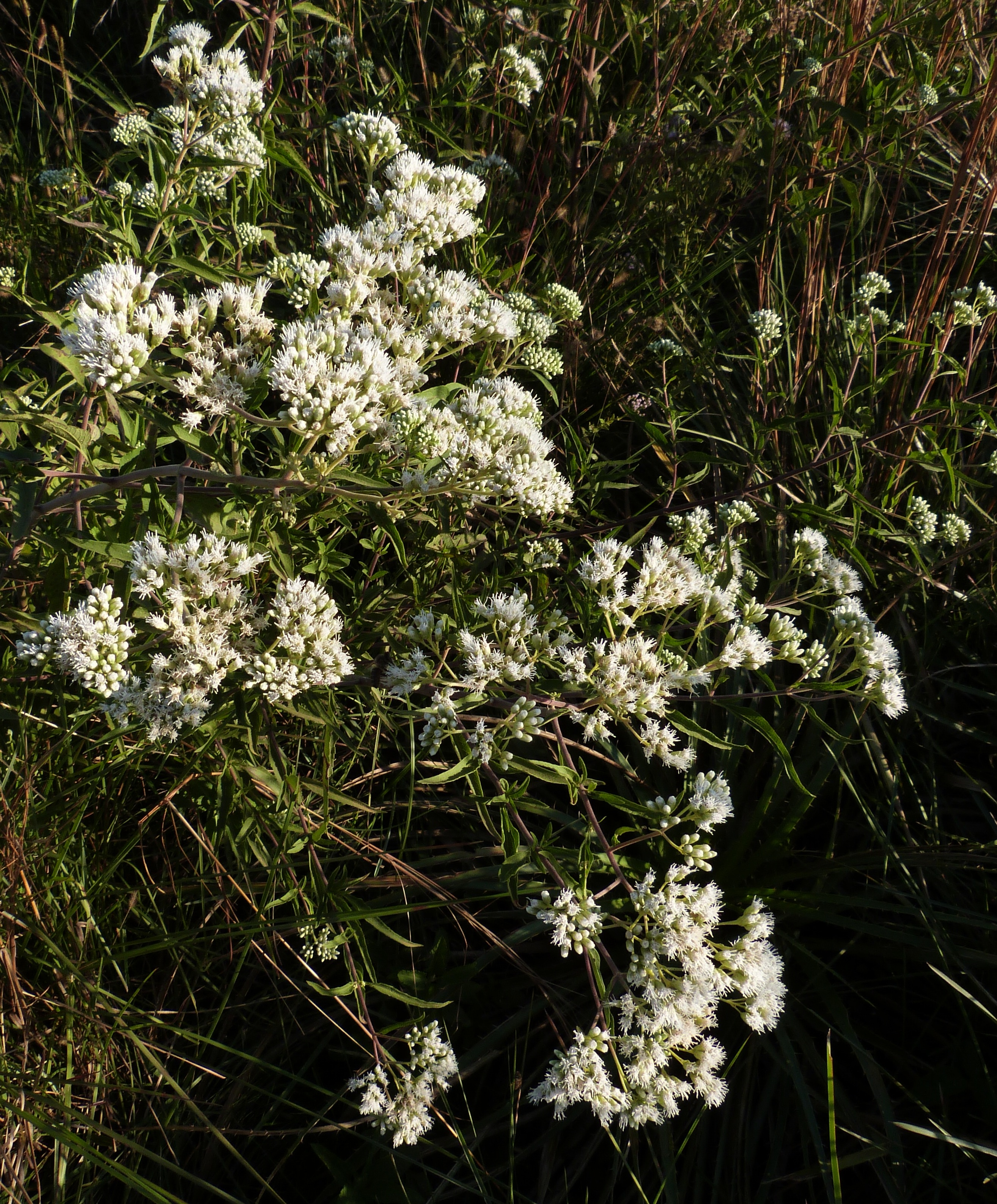
- Austroeupatorium inulifolium

Scientific classification
- Kingdom: Plantae
- Clade: Embryophytes
- Clade: Tracheophytes
- Clade: Angiosperms
- Clade: Eudicots
- Clade: Asterids
- Order: Asterales
- Family: Asteraceae
- Subfamily: Asteroideae
- Tribe: Eupatorieae
- Genus: Austroeupatorium; R.M.King & H.Rob.

Synonyms
- Eupatorium sect. Austroeupatorium (R.M.King & H.Rob.) Cabrera

= Austroeupatorium =

Genus of flowering plants

Austroeupatorium is a genus of plants native primarily to South America, including herbaceous perennials and shrubs. The native range is focused on eastern South America and extends as far north as Panama and Trinidad and as far west as Bolivia.

== Species ==
The species A. inulifolium is native to South America, from Panama to Argentina. It has been introduced to Sri Lanka, Indonesia, Taiwan, the Philippines, and Sumatra. It is a highly invasive species in the Knuckles Range in Sri Lanka. It can be either a herbaceous perennial or a shrub and can grow up to two meters tall. It particularly colonizes disturbed areas such as roadsides and fields prepared for planting.

Accepted species

- Austroeupatorium albescens (Gardner) R.M.King & H.Rob. – Goiás, Brazilia
- Austroeupatorium apensis (Chodat) R.M.King & H.Rob. – Paraguay, southern Brazil
- Austroeupatorium chaparense (B.L.Rob.) R.M.King & H.Rob. – Bolivia
- Austroeupatorium cordato-acuminatum H.Rob. – Brazil
- Austroeupatorium decemflorum (DC.) R.M.King & H.Rob. – Colombia, Ecuador, Peru, Bolivia
- Austroeupatorium entreriense (Hieron.) R.M.King & H.Rob. – Uruguay
- Austroeupatorium inulaefolium (Kunth) R.M.King & H.Rob. – Panama, Trinidad & Tobago, Venezuela, Colombia, Ecuador, Peru, Brazil, Uruguay
- Austroeupatorium laetevirens (Hook. & Arn.) R.M.King & H.Rob. – Paraguay, southern Brazil, northeastern Argentina
- Austroeupatorium morii R.M.King & H.Rob. – Bahia, Espirito Santo
- Austroeupatorium neglectum (B.L.Rob.) R.M.King & H.Rob. – Espirito Santo, Paraná, Minas Gerais, São Paulo
- Austroeupatorium patens (D.Don ex Hook. & Arn.) R.M.King & H.Rob. – Chile
- Austroeupatorium paulinum (DC.) R.M.King & H.Rob. – Amazonas
- Austroeupatorium petrophilum (B.L.Rob.) R.M.King & H.Rob. – Rio de Janeiro
- Austroeupatorium picturatum (Malme) R.M.King & H.Rob. – Paraná, Santa Catarina, northeastern Argentina
- Austroeupatorium rosmarinaceum (Cabrera & Vittet) R.M.King & H.Rob. – Paraná, Rio Grande do Sul
- Austroeupatorium silphiifolium (Mart.) R.M.King & H.Rob. – Bolivia, Paraguay, Bahia, Paraná, Minas Gerais, Brazilia, Goiás
