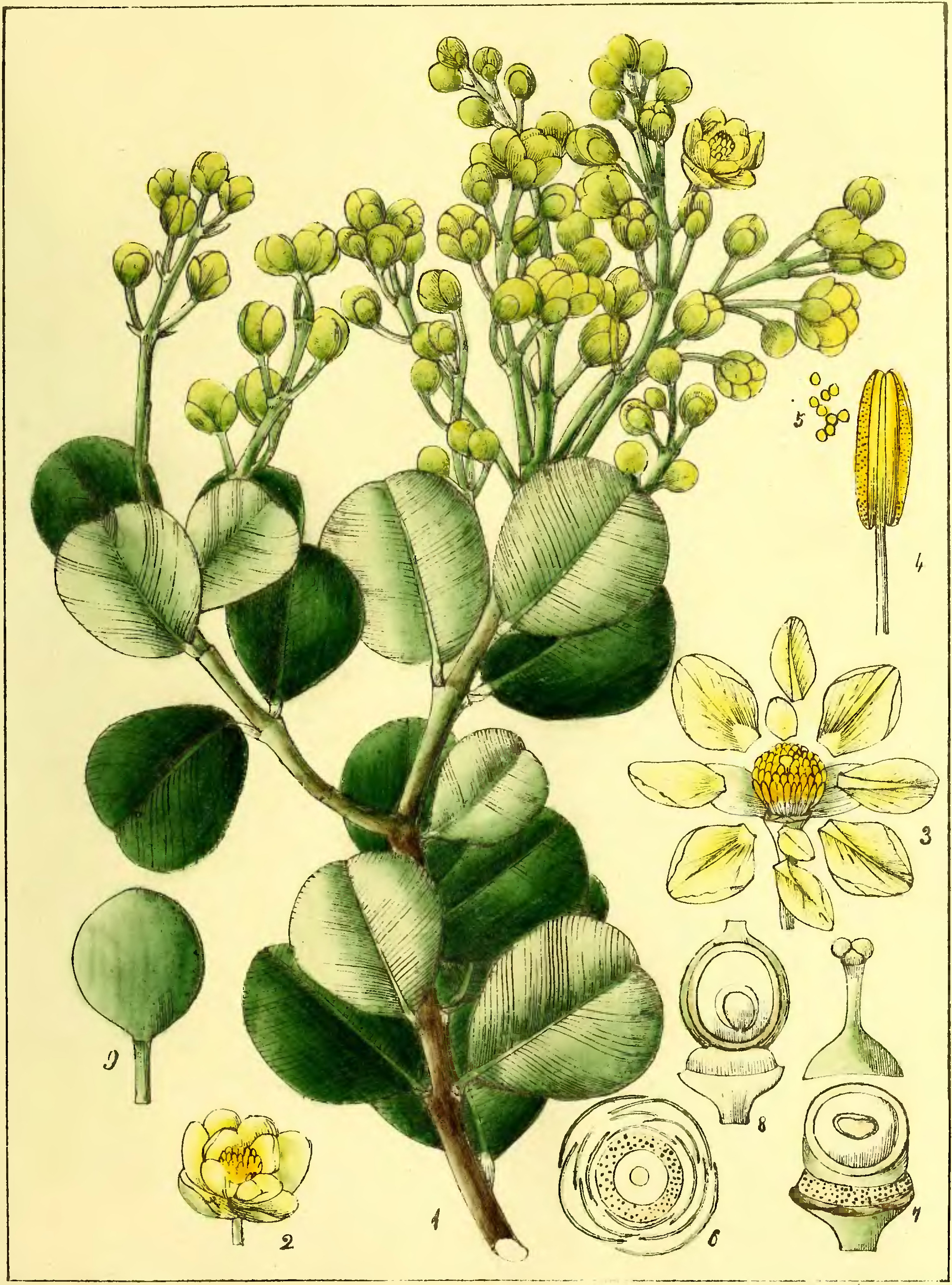
- Calophyllum walkeri in the Illustrations of Indian Botany

Conservation status
- Vulnerable (IUCN 2.3)

Scientific classification
- Kingdom: Plantae
- Clade: Tracheophytes
- Clade: Angiosperms
- Clade: Eudicots
- Clade: Rosids
- Order: Malpighiales
- Family: Calophyllaceae
- Genus: Calophyllum
- Species: C. walkeri

Binomial name
- Calophyllum walkeri Wight

= Calophyllum walkeri =

Species of flowering plant

Calophyllum walkeri is a species of flowering plant in the Calophyllaceae family. It is found only in Sri Lanka. It is reddish brown with dark streaks and is a strong, durable wood. It is used for beams, rafters, posts & door frames. It weighs about 46 lbs per cubic foot. It can be found in hill country in Sri Lanka. The leaves and bark have fragments. It is known as කින (Kina) in Sinhala.
