= World's End, Sri Lanka =

Cliff in Horton Plains National Park

Coordinates: 6°46′59.44″N 80°47′34.30″E

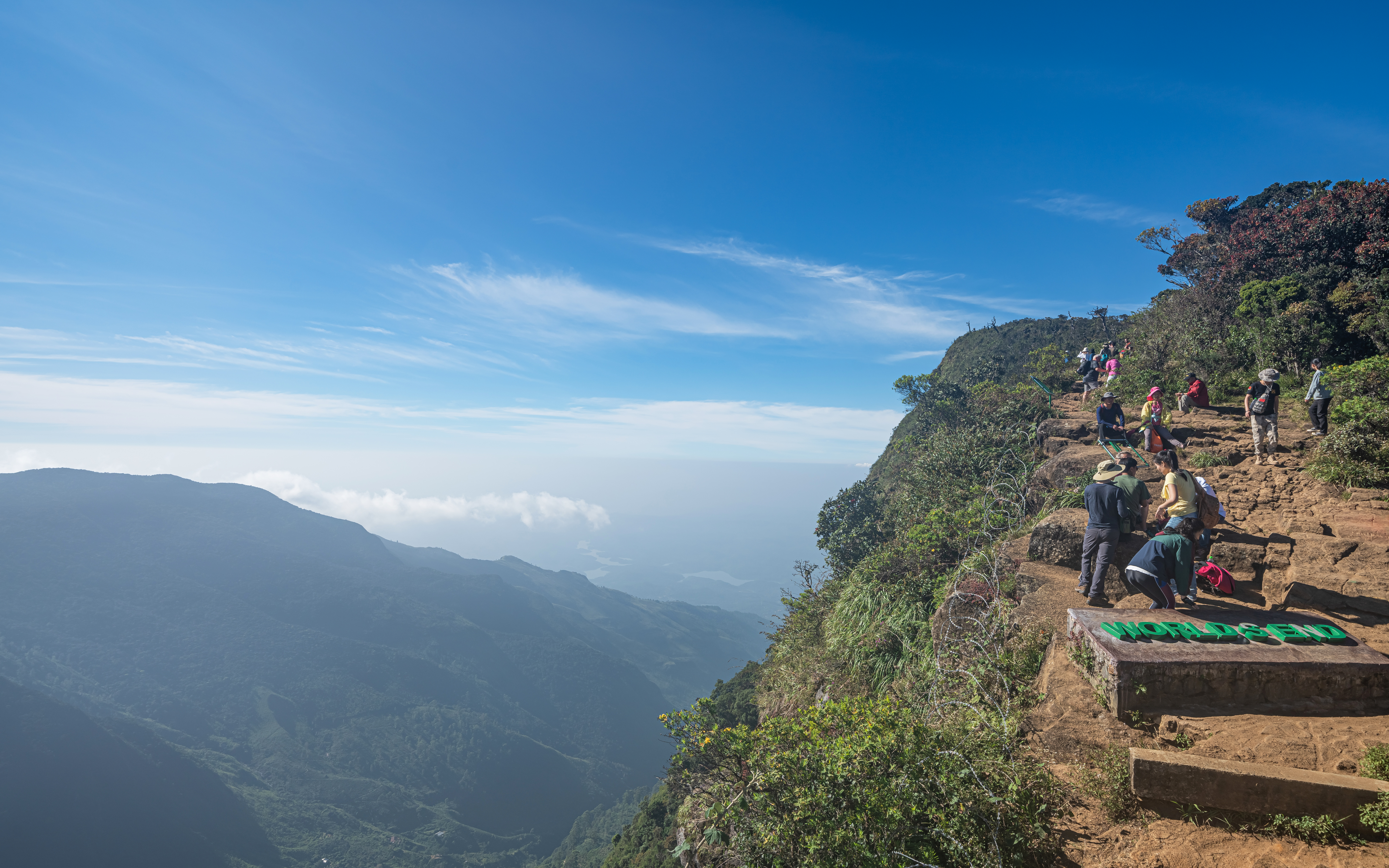
World's End with its sign

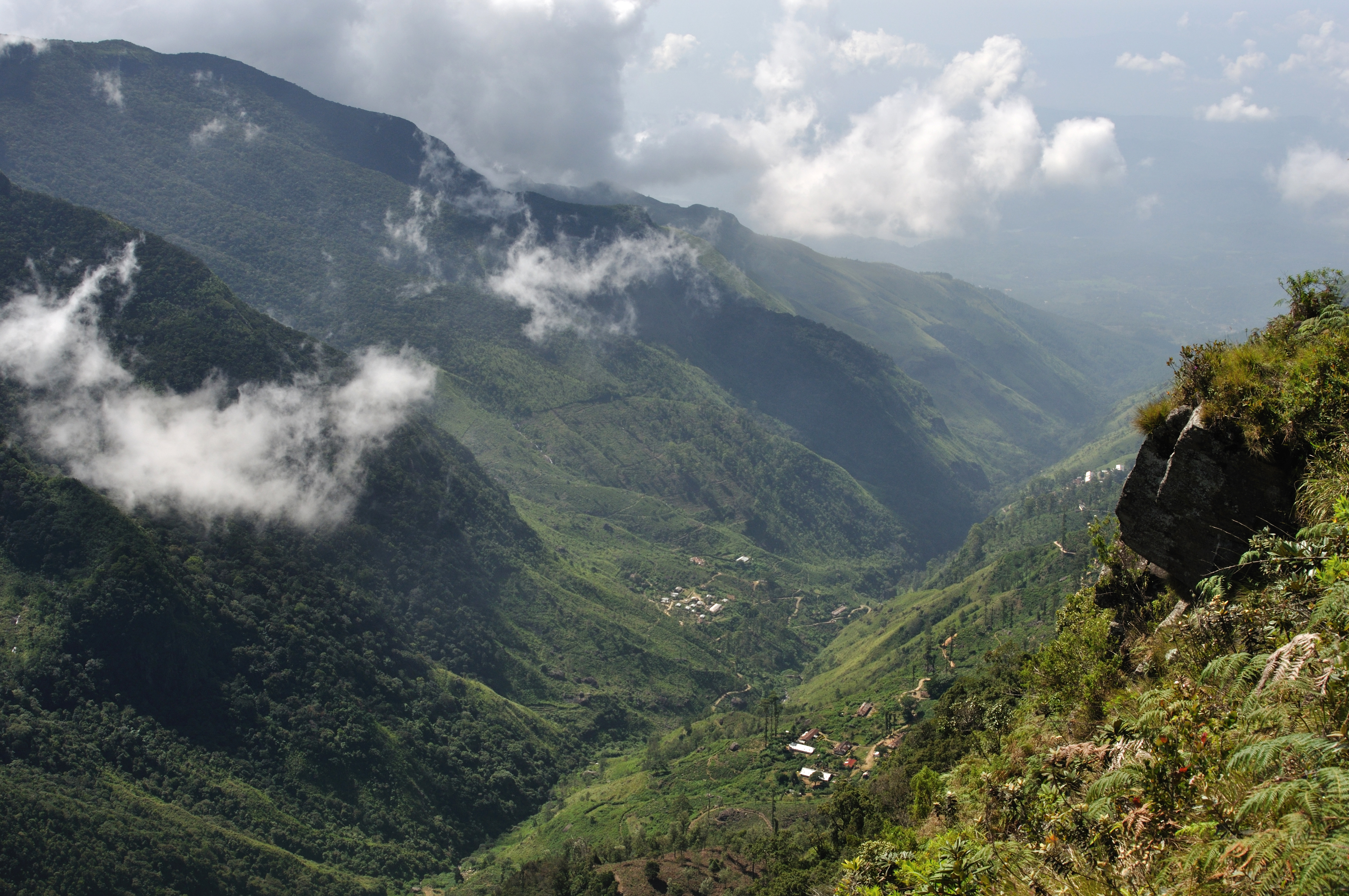
View from World's End, looking out over the boundary between the Central and Sabaragamuwa Provinces

World's End is located within the Horton Plains National Park in Nuwara Eliya District, Sri Lanka. It is a sheer cliff, with a drop of about 1,200 metres (4,000 ft). It is one of the most visited parts of the Park, and a key tourist attraction in the Nuwara Eliya District and the country at large.

1 km (0.62 mi) away from the main cliff is a smaller cliff with a 300 metres (1,000 ft) drop, colloquially known as Mini World's End. The Indian Ocean, 81 km (50 mi) to the south, can be observed on clear days.
