= Central Highlands of Sri Lanka =

UNESCO World Heritage Site

UNESCO World Heritage Site
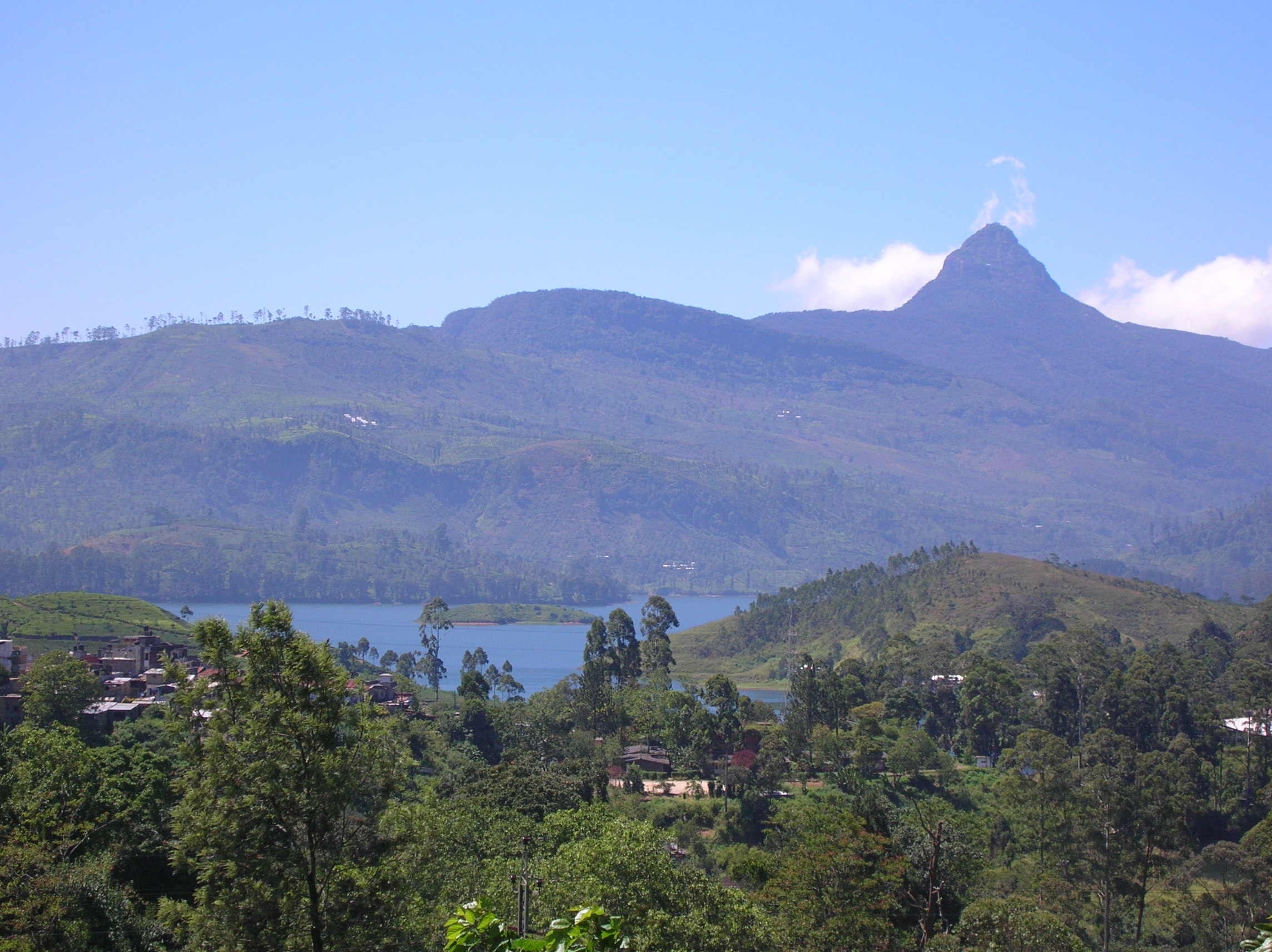
- Peak Wilderness encompasses the Adam's Peak

- Location within Sri Lanka Location within South Asia
- Location: Sri Lanka
- Includes: 1. Peak Wilderness Protected Area (PWPA); 2. Horton Plains National Park (HPNP); 3. Knuckles Conservation Forest (KCF)
- Criteria: Natural: (ix), (x)
- Reference: 1203
- Inscription: 2010 (34th Session)
- Area: 56,844 ha (140,460 acres)
- Buffer zone: 72,645 ha (179,510 acres)
- Coordinates: 7°27′N 80°48′E

Central Highlands of Sri Lanka is a recognised World Heritage Site in Sri Lanka. The site comprises the Peak Wilderness Protected Area, the Horton Plains National Park and the Knuckles Conservation Forest. These are rain forests and montane cloud forests where the elevation reaches 2,500 m (8,200 ft). The region harbors a variety of mammal species including the bear monkey, Trachypithecus vetulus monticola, (a subspecies of purple-faced langur) and the critically endangered [possibly extinct] Horton Plains slender loris, Loris tardigradus nycticeboides, (a subspecies of red slender loris).

This is the first Sri Lankan World Heritage site to be designated in 22 years, since the Sinharaja Forest Reserve was enlisted in 1988. Originally submitted for inscription as a mixed cultural and natural site, the Committee recognized only the natural values of the site. On 31 July 2010, the World Heritage Committee holding its 34th session in Brasília inscribed Central Highlands of Sri Lanka and Papahānaumokuākea of Hawaii as new World Heritage Sites.

== Sites ==
The Sri Lanka montane rain forests represent the montane and submontane moist forests above 1,000 metres (3,300 ft) in the central highlands and in the Knuckles mountain range. Half of Sri Lanka's endemic flowering plants and 51 percent of the endemic vertebrates are restricted to this ecoregion. This ecoregion is inhabited by five strict endemic mammals and eight near-endemics. The ecoregion also harbors five strict endemic bird species and 20 near endemics. The site incorporates three protected areas;

- Peak Wilderness Sanctuary
- Horton Plains National Park and
- Knuckles Mountain Range

Peak Wilderness Sanctuary is a sanctuary of 22,380 hectares (86.4 mi^{2}) of land area, which was established on 25 October 1940. Horton Plains National Park adjoins the eastern boundary. Horton Plains National Park has been originally designated a nature reserve on 5 December 1969 later elevated to the national park status on 16 March 1988. Knuckles mountain range is situated to the northeast and its relict, endemic flora and fauna is distinct from montane forest of central massif.

== See also ==
- List of World Heritage Sites by year of inscription (2010)
