= Knuckles Mountain Range =

Mountain range located in Sri Lanka

Dumbara Mountain Range
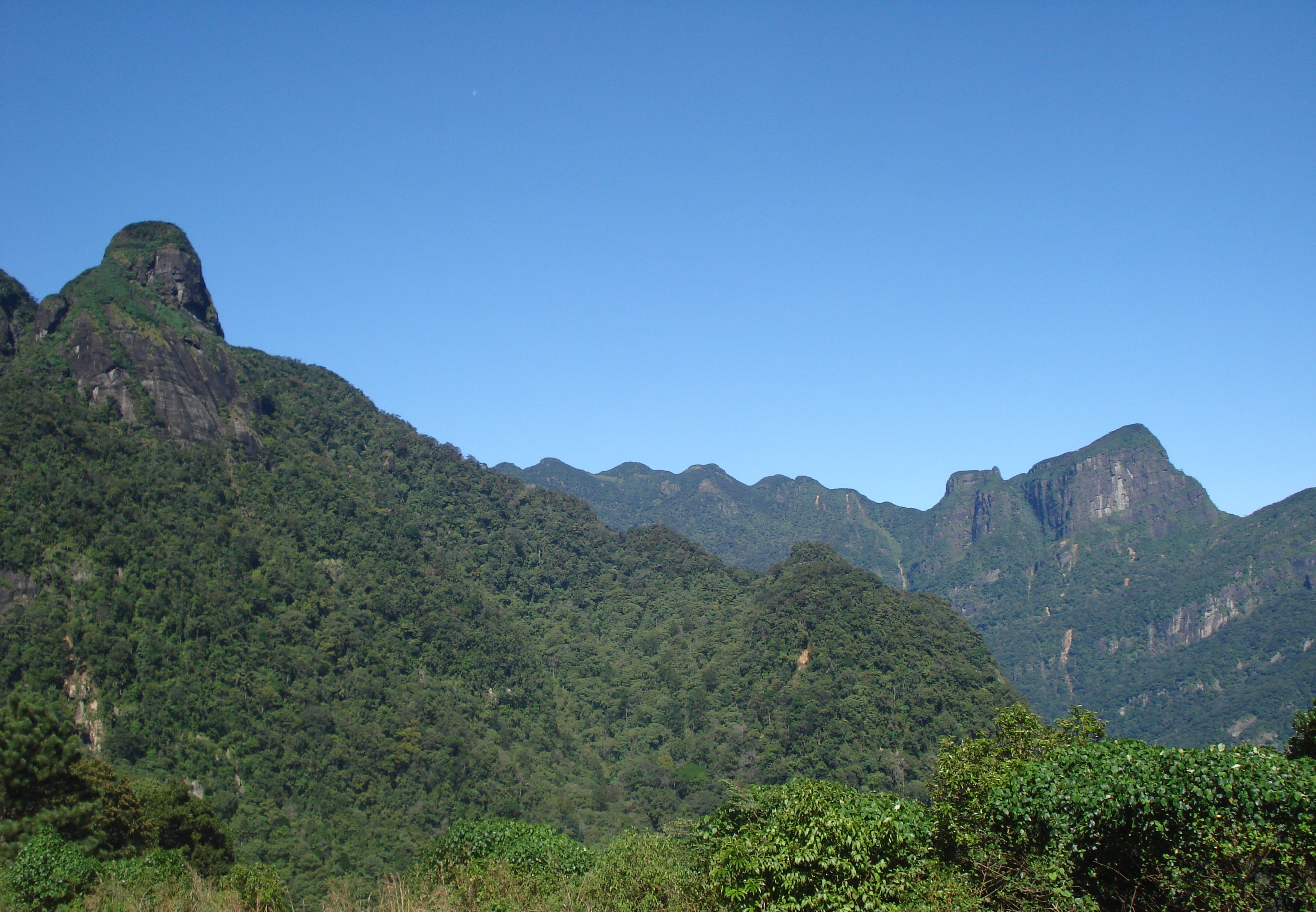
- A view of the Dumbara mountain range (Spinix 2 and five peaks behind)

- Location within Sri Lanka
- Location: Central Province, Sri Lanka
- Nearest city: Matale
- Coordinates: 7°27′N 80°48′E
- Area: L
- Governing body: Department of Forest Conservation
- World Heritage site: 1203-003: "Knuckles Conservation Forest (KCF)" since 2010 (within the site Central Highlands of Sri Lanka)

The Dumbara Mountain Range lies in central Sri Lanka, in the Districts of Matale and Kandy. The Sinhalese residents have traditionally referred to the area as Dumbara Kanduvetiya meaning Mist-laden Mountain Range. Early British surveyors gave the name knuckles, referring to a series of recumbent folds and peaks in the west of the massif which resemble the knuckles of clenched fist when viewed from certain locations in the Kandy District.

The higher montane area is often robed in thick layers of cloud. In addition to its aesthetic value, the range is of great scientific interest. It is a climatic microcosm of the rest of Sri Lanka as the conditions of all the climatic zones in the country are exhibited in the massif. At higher elevations there is a series of isolated cloud forests, harbouring a variety of flora and fauna. Although the range constitutes approximately 0.03% of the island's total area, it is home to a significantly higher proportion of the country's biodiversity. The isolated Dumbara range harbours several relict, endemic flora and fauna that are distinct from central massif. More than 34 percent of Sri Lanka's endemic trees, shrubs, and herbs are only found in these forests. Dumbara (Knuckles) Conservation Forest was included in UNESCO natural world heritage list in 2010 as part of Central Highlands of Sri Lanka.

== Dumbara Peaks ==
There are nine peaks over 1200 meters (4000 ft) in the Dumbara Range.

Peak	Summit	
Peak	m	ft
Gombaniya	1,906	6,253
Five Peaks	1,864	6,115
Knuckles-Kirigalpotta	1,647	5,404
Aliyawetunaela	1,647	5,404
Dumbanagala	1,644	5,394
Yakungegala	1,586	5,203
Dothalugala	1,575	5,167
Wamarapugala	1,559	5,115
Koboneelagala	1,555	5,102
Kalupahana (Thunthisgala)	1,628	5,341
Rilagala	1,605	5,266
Nawanagala	1,488	4,882
Telambugala	1,331	4,367
Lakegala	1,310	4,298
Maratuwegala	1,190	3,904
Balagiriya	1,148	3,766
Velangala	1,180	3,871
Lahumanagala	1,114	3,655
Kinihirigala	1,068	3,504
Lunumadalla	1,060	3,478

== Threats ==
Cultivation of cardamom at large scale in the montane forests is a major threat to the fragile forest ecosystem.

Invasive exotic plant species such as Mist Flower (Ageratina riparia) that increasingly spread into montane forest areas and montane grasslands destroy the unique native Sri Lankan flora.
