= List of reptiles of Sri Lanka =

This is a list of reptiles of Sri Lanka.

The reptilian diversity in Sri Lanka is higher than the diversity of other vertebrates such as mammals and fish with 181 reptile species. All extant reptiles are well documented through research by many local and foreign scientists and naturalists. Sri Lankan herpetologist, Anslem de Silva largely studied the biology and ecology of Sri Lanka snakes, where he documented 96 species of land and sea snakes. Five genera are endemic to Sri Lanka - Aspidura, Balanophis, Cercaspis, Haplocercus, and Pseudotyphlops. Out of them only five of the land snakes are considered potentially deadly and life threatening to humans. Among snakes, 54 are endemic to Sri Lanka. The total increased to 107 with new descriptions of Dendrelaphis, Rhinophis, Aspidura and Dryocalamus.

Lizard diversity in the island has been documented and studied by many local scientists and researchers such as Imesh Nuwan Bandara, Kalana Maduwage, Anjana Silva, Rohan Pethiyagoda, and Kelum Manamendra-Arachchi. There are 111 lizards known from Sri Lanka, with 17 newly discovered in 2006, and two more in 2016 and 2017. One of species was discovered in 2019 from Ensalwatta, Matara. In 2019, seven more endemic day geckos have been discovered by Suranjan Karunaratne and Mendis Wickramasinghe. In December 2019, three more endemic geckos were discovered. In May 2020, another endemic skink was discovered. Three new day gecko species were discovered in 2021.

Apart from them, Sri Lanka is home to two species of crocodiles, and nine species of turtles.

This is a list of reptiles found in Sri Lanka.

== Order: Squamata - scaled reptiles ==
=== Suborder: Serpentes - snakes ===
==== Family: Acrochordidae - wart snakes ====
Common name	Binomial	Local names	Status
Wart snake	Acrochordus granulatus	දිය ගොයා මඩ පණුවා	Least concern

==== Family: Boidae - boas ====
Common name	Binomial	Local names	Status
Sand boa	Eryx conicus	කොට පිඹුරා වැලි පිඹුරා	

==== Family: Pythonidae - pythons ====
Common name	Binomial	Local names	Status
Indian rock python	Python molurus	පිඹුරා	Near threatened (largest snake in Sri Lanka)

==== Family: Colubridae - colubers ====
Common name	Binomial	Local names	Status
Green vine snake	Ahaetulla nasuta	ඇහැ‍ටුල්ලා	Least concern
Brown vine snake	Ahaetulla pulverulenta	හෙනකඳයා	
Buff-striped keelback	Amphiesma stolatum	අහරකුක්කා	
Banded wolf snake or Joseph’s racer	Lycodon fasciolatus Platyceps josephi	වල් ගැරඬියා	Least concern
Boie's rough-sided snake	Aspidura brachyorrhos	ලේ මැඩිල්ලා	
Black-spined snake	Aspidura ceylonensis	කුරත් මැඩිල්ලා; කුරත් කරවලා; රත් කරවලා	
Cope's rough-sided snake	Aspidura copei	කළු මැඩිල්ලා	
De Silva's rough-sided snake	Aspidura desilvai	ද සිල්වාගේ මැඩිල්ලා	
Gunther's rough-sided snake	Aspidura guentheri	කුඩා මැඩිල්ලා	
Deraniyagala's rough-sided snake	Aspidura deraniyagalae	කදු මැඩිල්ලා	
Drummond-Hay's rough-sided snake	Aspidura drummondhayi	කෙටිවල් මැඩිල්ලා	
Ravana's rough-sided snake	Aspidura ravanai	රාවණාගේ මැඩිල්ලා	
Common rough-sided snake	Aspidura trachyprocta	දලව මැඩිල්ලා	
Olive keelback	Atretium schistosum	දියවර්ණයා	
Barnes' cat snake	Boiga barnesii	පදුරු මාපිලා	
Beddome's cat snake	Boiga beddomei	කහ මාපිලා	
Sri Lanka cat snake	Boiga ceylonensis	නිදි මාපිලා	
Forsten's cat snake	Boiga forsteni	කබර මාපිලා; ලේ මාපිලා; නාග මාපිලා; මහ මාපිලා	
Ranawana's cat snake	Boiga ranawanei	රණවනගේ රන් මාපිලා; කහ මාපිලා	
Common cat snake	Boiga trigonata	රෑන් මාපිලා; ගැරඬි මාපිලා	
Ornate flying snake	Chrysopelea ornata	පොල්මල් කරවලා; මල්සරා	
Sri Lanka flying snake	Chrysopelea taprobanica	දගරදණ්ඩා	
Trinket snake	Coelognathus helena	කටකළුවා	
Stripe-tailed bronzeback tree snake	Dendrelaphis caudolineolatus	වයිරී හාල්දණ්ඩා	
Boulenger's bronzeback tree snake	Dendrelaphis bifrenalis	පදුරු හාල්දණ්ඩා	
Sinharaja bronzeback tree snake	Dendrelaphis effrenis	සිංහරාජ හාල්දණ්ඩා; රත් හාල්දණ්ඩා	
Oliver's bronzeback tree snake	Dendrelaphis oliveri	ඔලිවර්ගේ හාල්දණ්ඩා; මලේ හාල්දණ්ඩා	
Schokar's bronzeback tree snake	Dendrelaphis schokari	මූකලන් හාල්දණ්ඩා; ශොකාර්ගේ හාල්දණ්ඩා; කූල්ගේ හාල්දණ්ඩා	
Common bronzeback tree snake	Dendrelaphis tristis	තුරු හාල්දණ්ඩා	
Wickramasinghe's bronzeback tree snake	Dendrelaphis wickrorum	වික්‍රමසිංහලාගේ හාල්දණ්ඩා	
Sri Lanka checkered keelback snake	Fowlea asperrimus	ශ්‍රි ලංකා දියබරියා	
Tikiri keelback snake	Fowlea unicolor	ටිකිරි දියබරියා; දිය නයා	
Lesser stripe-necked snake	Liopeltis calamaria	පන්බරියා	
Colombo wolf snake	Lycodon anamallensis	මල් රදනකයා	
Common wolf snake	Lycodon aulicus	අළු රදනකයා; අළු පොළඟා	
Chithrasekara's wolf snake	Lycodon chithrasekarai	චිත්‍රසේකරගේ ගැට රදනකයා	
Gunther's bridal snake	Lycodon gracilis	ගැට කරවලා	
Banded wolf snake	Lycodon fasciolatus	මල් රදනකයා	
Common bridal snake	Lycodon nympha	ගැට රදනකයා	
Barred wolf snake	Lycodon striatus	කබර රදනකයා; ඉටි කරවලා	
Templeton's kukri snake	Oligodon calamarius	කබර දත්කැටියා	
Sri Lanka wolf snake	Lycodon carinatus	දාර රදනකයා; දාර කරවලා	
Banded kukri snake	Oligodon arnensis	අරණි දත්කැටියා	
Streaked kukri snake	Oligodon sublineatus	පුල්ලි දත්කැටියා	
Variegated kukri snake	Oligodon taeniolatus	වයිරී දත්කැටියා	
Indian rat snake	Ptyas mucosa	ගැරඬියා	
Sri Lanka blossom krait	Rhabdophis ceylonensis	මල් කරවලා; නිහළුවා	
Green keelback snake	Rhabdophis plumbicolor	පලාබරියා	
Spotted black-headed snake	Sibynophis subpunctatus	දැතිගෝමරයා	

==== Family: Cylindrophiidae - pipe snakes ====
Common name	Binomial	Local names	Status
Sri Lanka pipe snake	Cylindrophis maculatus	දෙපත් නයා වටඋල්ලා	

==== Family: Elapidae - elapids ====
Common name	Binomial	Local names	Status
Common krait	Bungarus caeruleus	තෙල් කරවලා මගමරුවා	
Sri Lanka krait	Bungarus ceylonicus	මුදු කරවලා දුනු කරවලා	
Indian coral snake	Calliophis melanurus	දෙපත් කළුවා	
Blood-bellied coral snake	Calliophis haematoetron	බඩරතු දෙපත් කළුවා	
Indian cobra	Naja naja	නයා නාගයා	

==== Subfamily: Hydrophiinae - sea snakes ====
Common name	Binomial	Local names	Status
Peters's sea snake	Hydrophis bituberculatus	පීටර්ස්ගේ මුහුදු නයා	
Shaw's sea snake	Hydrophis curtus	ශෝගේ කුඩා මුහුදු නයා	
Annulated sea snake	Hydrophis cyanocinctus	වයිරන් මුහුදු නයා	
Striped sea snake	Hydrophis fasciatus	වයිරම් කුඩා හිස් මුහුදු නයා	
Spine-bellied sea snake	Hydrophis hardwickii	කුඩා මුහුදු නයා	
Plain sea snake	Hydrophis inornatus	පීටර්ගේ මුහුදු නයා	
Jerdon's sea snake	Hydrophis jerdoni	ජර්ඩන්ගේ මුහුදු නයා	
Persian Gulf sea snake	Hydrophis lapemoides	පර්සියානු මුහුදු නයා	
Bombay sea snake	Hydrophis mamillaris	බොම්බේ මුහුදු නයා	
Russell's sea snake	Hydrophis obscurus	රසල්ගේ මුහුදු නයා	
Ornate reef sea snake	Hydrophis ornatus	ග්‍රේගේ මුහුදු නයා විසිතුරු මුහුදු නයා	
Yellow-bellied sea snake	Hydrophis platurus	බඩ කහ මුහුදු නයා	
Hook-nosed snake	Hydrophis schistosus	හොට වාලක්කඩියා	
Yellow sea snake	Hydrophis spiralis	මහ මුහුදු නයා	
Stokes's sea snake	Hydrophis stokesii	මහ වාලක්කඩියා	
Collared sea snake	Hydrophis stricticollis	ගුන්තර්ගේ මුහුදු නයා	
Viperine sea snake	Hydrophis viperinus	පොලොං මුහුදු නයා	
Slender sea snake	Microcephalophis gracilis	කුඩා හිස් මුහුදු නයා	

==== Family: Homalopsidae - Indo-Australian water snakes ====
Common name	Binomial	Local names	Status
Dog-faced water snake	Cerberus rynchops	කුණුදිය කළුවා	Least Concern
Rainbow water snake	Enhydris enhydris	දේදුනු දියබරියා	Least Concern
Glossy marsh snake	Gerarda prevostiana	ප්‍රෙවොස්ටිගේ දියබරියා කඩොලාන දියබරියා	Least Concern

==== Family: Gerrhopilidae - Indo-Malayan blind snakes ====
Common name	Binomial	Local names	Status
Sri Lanka worm snake	Gerrhopilus ceylonicus	ස්මිත්ගේ කණඋල්ලා	
Jan's blind snake	Gerrhopilus mirus	හීන් කණ උල්ලා	

==== Family: Typhlopidae - blind snakes ====
Common name	Binomial	Local names	Status
Brahminy blind snake	Indotyphlops braminus	දුමු‍ටු කණඋල්ලා	
Lanka blind snake	Indotyphlops lankaensis	ලක් කණඋල්ලා	
Pied blind snake	Indotyphlops leucomelas	කබර කණඋල්ලා	
Malcolm's blind snake	Indotyphlops malcolmi	මැල්කම්ගේ කණඋල්ලා	
Slender blind snake	Indotyphlops porrectus	ස්ටොලික්ස්කාගේ සිහින් කණඋල්ලා	
Taylor's blind snake	Indotyphlops tenebrarum	ටේලර්ගේ කණඋල්ලා	
Veddha's blind snake	Indotyphlops veddae	වැද්දාගේ කණඋල්ලා	
Violet blind snake	Indotyphlops violaceus	දම් කණඋල්ලා	

==== Family: Uropeltidae - shield-tailed snakes ====
Common name	Binomial	Local names	Status
Madurai shieldtail	Platyplectrurus madurensis		
Blyth's shieldtail	Rhinophis blythi	ගෝමර තුඩුල්ලා	
Orange shieldtail	Rhinophis dorsimaculatus	තම්බපන්නි වල්ගාඇබයා	
Drummond-Hay's shieldtail	Rhinophis drummondhayi	තපෝ තුඩුල්ලා	
Eranga Viraj's shieldtail	Rhinophis erangaviraji	එරංග විරාජ්ගේ තුඩුල්ලා	
Gunasekara's shieldtail	Rhinophis gunasekarai	ගුණසේකරගේ තුඩුල්ලා	
Hemprich's shieldtail	Rhinophis homolepis	දෙපත් තුඩුල්ලා	
Striped shieldtail	Rhinophis lineatus	ඉරි තුඩුල්ලා	
Mendis' shieldtail	Rhinophis mendisi	මෙන්ඩිස්ගේ තුඩුල්ලා	
Schneider's shieldtail	Rhinophis oxyrhynchus	උල් තුඩුල්ලා	
Cuvier's shieldtail	Rhinophis philippinus	කුවියර්ගේ වල්ගාඇබයා	
Phillip's earth snake	Rhinophis phillipsi	‍ෆිලිප්ස්ගේ තුඩුල්ලා	
Willey's shieldtail	Rhinophis porrectus	දිග් තුඩුල්ලා	
Müller's shieldtail	Rhinophis punctatus	තිත් තුඩුල්ලා	
Roshan Perera's shieldtal	Rhinophis roshanpererai	රොෂාන් පෙරේරාගේ තුඩුල්ලා	
Large shieldtail	Rhinophis saffragamus	මහ බිංඋල්ලා	
Deraniyagala's shieldtail	Rhinophis tricoloratus	දැරණියගලගේ වල්ගාඇබයා	
Zig-zag shieldtail	Rhinophis zigzag	සිග්සැග් වල්ගාඇබයා	
Gray's earth snake	Uropeltis melanogaster	කළු වක‍ටුල්ලා	
Southern earth snake	Uropeltis ruhunae	රුහුණු වක‍ටුල්ලා	

==== Family: Viperidae - vipers and pit vipers ====
Common name	Binomial	Local names	Status
Russell's viper	Daboia russelii	තිත් පොළඟා දාර පොළඟා	
Saw-scaled viper	Echis carinatus	වැලි පොළඟා	
Hump-nosed pit viper	Hypnale hypnale	පොළොං තෙලිස්සා කුණක‍ටුවා ගැට පොළඟා	
Highland hump-nosed pit viper	Hypnale nepa	කදුකර මූකලන් තෙලිස්සා	
Lowland hump-nosed pit viper	Hypnale zara	පහතරට මූකලන් තෙලිස්සා	
Amal's hump-nosed pit viper	Hypnale sp. Amal	අමල්ගේ තෙලිස්සා	Not given species validity yet.
Sri Lanka green pit viper	Craspedocephalus trigonocephalus	පළා පොළඟා	

=== Suborder: Lacertilia - lizards ===
==== Family: Agamidae - agamid lizards ====
Common name	Binomial	Local names	Status
Common green forest lizard	Calotes calotes	පළා ක‍ටුස්සා	
Painted-lipped lizard	Calotes ceylonensis	තොල විසිතුරු ක‍ටුස්සා	
Morningside lizard	Calotes desilvai	ද සිල්වාගේ ක‍ටුස්සා	
Crestless lizard	Calotes liocephalus	කොඳු දැතිරහිත කටුස්සා	
Whistling lizard	Calotes liolepis	සිවුරුහඬලන කටුස්සා	
Manamendra-Arachchi's whistling lizard	Calotes manamendrai	මනමේන්ද්‍රගේ සිවුරුහඬලන කටුස්සා	
Black-lipped lizard	Calotes nigrilabris	කළු කොපුල් කටුස්සා	
Garden lizard	Calotes versicolor	ගරා කටුස්සා	
Rough-horned lizard	Ceratophora aspera	රළු අං කටුස්සා	
Erdelen's horned lizard	Ceratophora erdeleni	අර්ඩ්ලන්ගේ අං කටුස්සා	
Karu's horned lizard	Ceratophora karu	කරුණාරත්නගේ අං කටුස්සා	
Rhino horned lizard	Ceratophora stoddartii	කගමුව අං කටුස්සා	
Leaf-nosed lizard	Ceratophora tennentii	පෙති අං කටුස්සා	
Ukuwelas's rough horn lizard	Ceratophora ukuwelai	උකුවෙලගේ රළු අං කටුස්සා	
Pygmy lizard	Cophotis ceylanica	කඳුකර කුරු කටුස්සා	
Knuckles pygmy lizard	Cophotis dumbara	දුම්බර කුරු කටුස්සා	critically endangered
Hump-nosed lizard	Lyriocephalus scutatus	ගැටහොඹු කටුස්සා කරමල් බෝදිලියා	
Sri Lanka kangaroo lizard	Otocryptis wiegmanni	පිනුම් කටුස්සා ගොමු තැලිකටුස්සා	
Black-spotted kangaroo lizard	Otocryptis nigristigma	පහතරට පිනුම් කටුස්සා වියළි පිනුම් කටුස්සා	
Bahir's fan-throated lizard	Sitana bahiri	බාහීර්ගේ තැලි කටුස්සා	
Devaka's fan-throated lizard	Sitana devakai	දේවකගේ තැලි කටුස්සා	
Fan-throated lizard	Sitana ponticeriana	පුලින තැලි කටුස්සා වැලි කටුස්සා	

==== Family: Chamaeleonidae - chameleons ====
Common name	Binomial	Local names	Status
Indian chameleon	Chamaeleo zeylanicus	බෝදිලිමා බෝදිලියා	

==== Family: Gekkonidae - geckoes ====
Common name	Binomial	Local names	Status
Sri Lanka golden gecko	Calodactylodes illingworthorum	මහ ගල්හූනා	
Alwis's day gecko	Cnemaspis alwisi	අල්විස්ගේ දිවාසැරි හූනා	
Amith's day gecko	Cnemaspis amith	අමිත්ගේ දිවාසැරි හූනා	
Anslem's day gecko	Cnemaspis anslemi	ඇන්ස්ලම්ගේ දිවාසැරි හූනා	
Butewa's day gecko	Cnemaspis butewai	බූටෑවගේ දිවාසැරි හූනා	
	Cnemaspis clivicola	කඳු දිවාසැරි හූනා	
Dissanayaka's day gecko	Cnemaspis dissanayakai	දිසානායකගේ දිවාසැරි හූනා	
Gemunu's day gecko	Cnemaspis gemunu	ගැමුණුගේ දිවාසැරි හූනා	
Godagedara's day gecko	Cnemaspis godagedarai	ගොඩගෙදරගේ දිවාසැරි හූනා	
Gotaimbara's day gecko	Cnemaspis gotaimbarai	ගෝටයිම්බරගේ දිවාසැරි හූනා	
Gunasekara's day gecko	Cnemaspis gunasekarai	ගුණසේකරගේ දිවාසැරි හූනා	
Gunawardana's day gecko	Cnemaspis gunawardanai	ගුණවර්ධනගේ දිවාසැරි හූනා	
Hitihami's day gecko	Cnemaspis hitihami	හිටිහාමිගේ දිවාසැරි හූනා	
	Cnemaspis kallima	ගම්මඩුව දිවාසැරි හූනා	
Kivulegedara's day gecko	Cnemaspis kivulegedarai	කිවුලේගෙදරගේ දිවාසැරි හූනා	
Kohukumbura's day gecko	Cnemaspis kohukumburai	කොහුකුඹුරගේ දිවාසැරි හූනා	
Kandamby's day gecko	Cnemaspis kandambyi	කණ්ඩම්බිගේ දිවාසැරි හූනා	
Kandyan day gecko	Cnemaspis kandiana	කඳුකර දිවාසැරි හූනා	
Kawmini's day gecko	Cnemaspis kawminiae	කව්මිණිගේ දිවාසැරි හූනා	
Kotagama's day gecko	Cnemaspis kotagamai	කොටගමගේ දිවාසැරි හූනා	
Kumarasinghe's day gecko	Cnemaspis kumarasinghei	කුමාරසිංහගේ දිවාසැරි හූනා	
Latha's day gecko	Cnemaspis latha	භූෂණ දිවාසැරි හූනා	
Lokuge’s day gecko	Cnemaspis lokugei	ලොකුගේගේ දිවාසැරි හූනා	
Menike's day gecko	Cnemaspis menikay	රත්න දිවාසැරි හූනා	
Molligoda's day gecko	Cnemaspis molligodai	මොල්ලිගොඩගේ දිවාසැරි හූනා	
Nilgala day gecko	Cnemaspis nilgala	නිල්ගල දිවාසැරි හූනා	
Nandimithra's day gecko	Cnemaspis nandimithrai	නන්දිමිත්‍රගේ දිවාසැරි හූනා	
	Cnemaspis pava		
Phillip's day gecko	Cnemaspis phillipsi	පිලිප්ගේ දිවාසැරි හූනා	
Deraniyagala's day gecko	Cnemaspis podihuna	කුඩා දිවාසැරි හූනා පොඩි ගල්හූනා	
	Cnemaspis pulchra	රක්වාන දිවාසැරි හූනා	
	Cnemaspis punctata	තිත් දිවාසැරි හූනා	
Rajakaruna's day gecko	Cnemaspis rajakarunai	රාජකරුණාගේ දිවාසැරි හූනා	
Rammale day gecko	Cnemaspis rammalensis	රම්මලේ දිවාසැරි හූනා	
Ranwella's day gecko	Cnemaspis ranwellai	රන්වැල්ලගේ දිවාසැරි හූනා	
Retigala day gecko	Cnemaspis retigalensis	රිටිගල දිවාසැරි හූනා	
Samanala day gecko	Cnemaspis samanalensis	සමනල දිවාසැරි හූනා	
Rocky day gecko	Cnemaspis scalpensis	ගන්නෝරුව දිවාසැරි හූනා ජර්ඩන්ගේ දිවාසැරි හූනා	
Forest day gecko	Cnemaspis silvula	වන දිවාසැරිහූනා	
Rough-bellied day gecko	Cnemaspis tropidogaster	රලෝදර දිවාසැරි හූනා	
Upendra's day gecko	Cnemaspis upendrai	උපේන්ද්‍රගේ දිවාසැරි හූනා	
Slender-headed bent-toed gecko	Cyrtodactylus cracens	සිංහරාජ වක්නිය හූනා	
Taylor's bent-toed gecko	Cyrtodactylus edwardtaylori	ටේලර්ගේ වක්නිය හූනා	
Bridled bent-toed gecko	Cyrtodactylus fraenatus	මහකැලෑ හූනා	
Ramboda bent-toed gecko	Cyrtodactylus ramboda	රම්බොඩ වක්නිය හූනා	
Knuckles bent-toed gecko	Cyrtodactylus soba	දුම්බර වක්නිය හූනා	
Sinharaja bent-toed gecko	Cyrtodactylus subsolanus	සිංහරාජ වක්නිය හූනා	
spotted ground gecko	Geckoella triedrus	පුල්ලි හූනා	
Blotched ground gecko	Geckoella yakhuna	ලපවන් වක්නිය හූනා යක් හූනා	
Four-clawed gecko	Gehyra mutilata	චතුරංගුලි හූනා	
Brooke's house gecko	Hemidactylus brookii	පුල්ලි ගේ හූනා	
Kandyan gecko	Hemidactylus depressus	හැලි ගේ හූනා	
Asian house gecko	Hemidactylus frenatus	ගේ හූනා	
Spotted giant gecko	Hemidactylus hunae	දැවැන්ත තිත් හූනා	
Termite hill gecko	Hemidactylus lankae	හුඹස් හූනා	
Bark gecko	Hemidactylus leschenaultii	කිඹුල් හූනා කබර හූනා ගස්‌ හූනා කුඹුක්‌ හූනා	
Spotted house gecko	Hemidactylus parvimaculatus	තිත් ගේ හූනා	
	Hemidactylus pieresii	පිඹුරු හූනා	
Flat-tailed gecko	Hemidactylus platyurus	නගුට වකරැලි හූනා	
Scaly gecko	Hemidactylus scabriceps	කොරපොතු හූනා	
Indopacific tree gecko	Hemiphyllodactylus typus	සිහින් හූනා	
Mourning gecko	Lepidodactylus lugubris	ශල්ක පා හූනා	

==== Family: Lacertidae - wall lizards ====
Common name	Binomial	Local names	Status
Leschenault's snake-eyed lizard	Ophisops leschenaultii	පඳුරු සර්පාක්ෂි කටුස්සා	
Lesser snake-eyed lizard	Ophisops minor	කුඩා සර්පාක්ෂි කටුස්සා	

==== Family: Scincidae - skinks ====
Common name	Binomial	Local names	Status
Four-toed skink	Chalcidoseps thwaitesii	චතුරංගුලි සර්පීය හිකනලා	
Haly's tree skink	Dasia haliana	හේලිගේ රුක්හීරළුවා	Endangered
Deignan's Lanka skink	Lankascincus deignani	ඩේග්නන්ගේ ලක්හීරළුවා	
Catenated lankaskink	Lankascincus dorsicatenatus	දම්වැල් ලක්හීරළුවා දම්වැල් සිඟිති හිකනලා	
Common supple skink	Lankascincus fallax	සුලබ ලක්හීරළුවා	
Gan's Lanka skink	Lankascincus gansi	ගෑන්ස්ගේ ලක්හීරළුවා	
Greer's Lanka skink	Lankascincus greeri	ග්‍රීයර්ගේ ලක්හීකනලා	
Munindradasa's Lanka skink	Lankascincus munindradasai	මුණින්ද්‍රදාසගේ ලක්හීරළුවා	
Sameera's Lanka skink	Lankascincus sameerai		
Adam's Peak Lanka skink	Lankascincus sripadensis	ශ්‍රීපා කඳු දුඹුරු හිකනලා	
Smooth Lanka skink	Lankascincus taprobanense	සුමුදු ලක්හීරළුවා	Near threatened
Taylor's Lanka skink	Lankascincus taylori	ටේලර්ගේ ලක්හීරළුවා	
Sri Lanka supple skink	Lygosoma singha	ටේලර්ගේ හීරළුහිකනලා	Data deficient
Beddome's skink	Eutropis beddomii	වයිරන් හිකනලා	
Bibron's skink	Eutropis bibroni	වැලි හිකනලා	
Keeled Indian mabuya	Eutropis carinata	සුලබ හිකනලා	
Taylor's striped mabuya	Eutropis floweri	ටේලර්ගේ හිකනලා	
Bronze mabuya	Eutropis macularia	පිඟු හිකනලා	
Sri Lanka bronze mabuya	Eutropis madaraszi	පුල්ලි හිකනලා	
Tammanna skink	Eutropis tammanna	තම්මැන්නා හිකනලා	
Smith's snake skink	Nessia bipes	ස්මිත්ගේ සර්පහීරළුවා	
Three-toed snake skink	Nessia burtonii	ත්‍රියංගුලි සර්පහීරළුවා	
Deraniyagala's snake skink	Nessia deraniyagalai	දැරණියගලගේ සර්පහීරළුවා	
Two-toed snake skink	Nessia didactyla	දෙයංගුලි සර්පහීරළුවා	
Shark-headed snake skink	Nessia hickanala	මෝර හිස් සර්පහීරළුවා	
Layard's snake skink	Nessia layardi	ලෙයාර්ඩ්ගේ සර්පහීරළුවා	
Toeless snake skink	Nessia monodactyla	අනංගුලි සර්පහීරළුවා	
Sarasins' snake skink	Nessia sarasinorum	සරසින්ගේ සර්පහීරළුවා	
Spotted supple skink	Riopa punctata	තිත් හීරළුහිකනලා	
Dussumier's litter skink	Sphenomorphus dussumieri	ශල්ක සිඟිති හිකනලා	

==== Family: Varanidae - monitor lizards ====
Common name	Binomial	Local names	Status
Bengal monitor	Varanus bengalensis	තලගොයා	Near threatened
Water monitor	Varanus salvator	කබරගොයා	Least concern

== Order: Crocodilia - crocodiles ==
=== Family: Crocodylidae - true crocodiles ===
Common name	Binomial	Local names	Status
Mugger crocodile	Crocodylus palustris	හැල කිඹුලා	Vulnerable
Saltwater crocodile	Crocodylus porosus	ගැට කිඹුලා	Least concern

== Order: Testudines - turtles ==
=== Family: Geoemydidae - Asian terrapins ===
Common name	Binomial	Local names	Status
Indian black turtle	Melanochelys trijuga	ගල් ඉබ්බා	Near threatened

=== Family: Cheloniidae - sea turtles ===
Common name	Binomial	Local names	Status
Loggerhead sea turtle	Caretta caretta	ඔලුගෙඩි කැස්බෑවා	Endangered
Green sea turtle	Chelonia mydas	ගල් කැස්බෑවා වැලි කැස්බෑවා	Endangered
Hawksbill sea turtle	Eretmochelys imbricata	පොතු කැස්බෑවා ලෙලි කැස්බෑවා	Critically endangered
Olive ridley sea turtle	Lepidochelys olivacea	බටු කැස්බෑවා මඩ කැස්බෑවා	Vulnerable

=== Family: Dermochelyidae - leatherback turtles ===
Common name	Binomial	Local names	Status
Leatherback sea turtle	Dermochelys coriacea	දාර කැස්බෑවා තුන්දාර කැස්බෑවා	Vulnerable

=== Family: Emydidae - American hard-shelled turtles ===
Common name	Trinomial	Local names	Status
Red-eared slider	Trachemys scripta elegans	රතු කන් ඉබ්බා	Near threatened

=== Family: Testudinidae - tortoises ===
Common name	Binomial	Local names	Status
Indian star tortoise	Geochelone elegans	තාරකා ඉබ්බා මේවර ඉබ්බා	Least concern

=== Family: Trionychidae - softshells ===
Common name	Binomial	Local names	Status
Sri Lankan flapshell turtle	Lissemys ceylonensis	කිරි ඉබ්බා	Least concern
