= Cnemaspis kandambyi =

Scientific classification
- Kingdom: Animalia
- Phylum: Chordata
- Class: Reptilia
- Order: Squamata
- Suborder: Gekkota
- Family: Gekkonidae
- Genus: Cnemaspis
- Species: C. kandambyi

Binomial name
- Cnemaspis kandambyi Batuwita & Udugampala, 2017

Species of lizard

Cnemaspis kandambyi is a species of diurnal gecko endemic to island of Sri Lanka, described in 2017 from Knuckles Mountain Range.

== Taxonomy ==
The species is closely related to Cnemaspis podihuna and found sympatric to C. kallima, C. phillipsi and C. punctata in Knuckles.

== Description ==
The species can be identified due to three enlarged postmentals, four precloacal pores, and dark brown coloration with diamond shaped dark markings. Adult is known to ranges from 23.6 mm in length from snout to vent.

== Etymology ==
The specific name kandambyi is named in honor of Dharma Sri Kandamby, who was curator of the vertebrate section of the National Museum of Colombo from 1982 to 2012.
