= Hakgala Strict Nature Reserve =

Nature reserve in Sri Lanka

- IUCN category Ia (strict nature reserve)
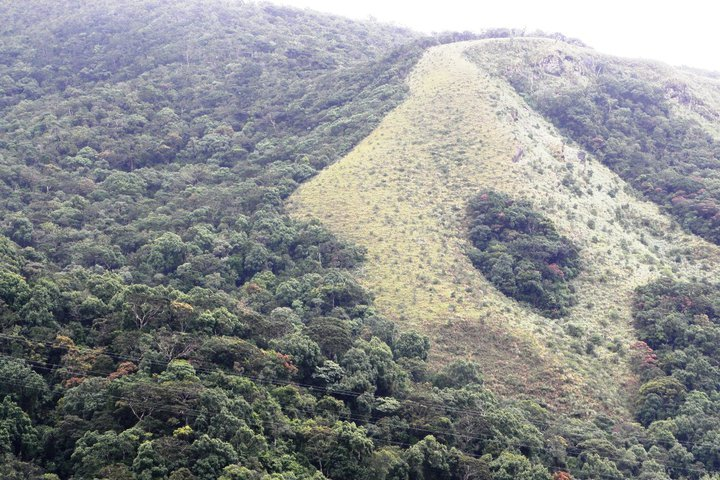
- The reserve as seen from the botanical garden

- Location within Sri Lanka
- Location: Central Province and Uva Province, Sri Lanka
- Nearest city: Nuwara Eliya
- Coordinates: 6°55′N 80°48′E
- Area: 1,142 ha (2,820 acres)
- Established: February 25, 1938
- Governing body: Department of Wildlife Conservation

Hakgala Strict Nature Reserve is one of the three strict nature reserves in Sri Lanka, the only one in the wet zone. The reserve is an important although isolated cloud forest which supports a number of faunal species including some endemics. The area was designated a strict nature reserve on 25 February 1938. The reserve is adjacent to and contiguous with the Hakgala Botanical Garden which was founded in 1860.

== Physical features ==
The Hakgala reserve covers an area of 11.42 square kilometres (4.41 sq mi) the altitude of which ranges from 1,650 metres (5,410 ft) to 2,178 metres (7,146 ft) at the summit of Hakgala peak. The reserve receives 2,400 millimetres (94 in) of mean annual rainfall with rain falling on 211 days of the year. The soil of the reserve consists of red-yellow podsols this is due to the bookly. The reserve is situated on the south bank of Sita-Eliya and includes most of the Hakgala massif. The name of this range is derived from several of the peaks being said to have the shape of an elephant's jaw. In the Sinhala language Hak is jaw and Gala is rock.

Tropical cloud forests in Hakgala Strict Nature Reserve Strict Nature Reserve

== Folklore ==
The nearby Sita Amman Hindu temple of Sita Eliya has a tradition that goes back to the legend of Ramayana. According to folk legends, the demon king of Lanka, Ravana, kept Sita hidden in this area.

== Flora ==
Vegetation of the reserve consists of montane cloud forests. These forests are noted for endemic archaic Hortonia floribunda and many orchids. Endemics of Calophyllum walkeri, Syzygium rotundifolium, Elaeocarpus montanus are the common floral species of the reserve. In the undergrowth many Strobilanthes species are common. According to height, the forest is categorised into two types; dwarf forests which is dominated by low growing Osbeckia buxifolia while taller forests featured by Rhododendron zeylanicum and Actinodaphne speciosa.

Endemic Coleus hakgalensis; only found in Hakgala Strict Nature Reserve

== Fauna ==
The reserve harbours many species of endemic mammals such as purple-faced langur, toque macaque, mayor's mouse, Ohiya rat, Kelaart's long-clawed shrew, Sri Lankan long-tailed shrew, and Pearson's long-clawed shrew. Some of these mammals are strictly endemic to this region. Sri Lanka leopard, fishing cat, wild boar, Sri Lankan sambar deer, grizzled giant squirrel, red giant flying squirrel, and pungent pipistrelle are some of the other mammals found in the reserve. The Sri Lankan elephant was reported to be present in 1939.

Avifauna of the reserve exhibits a high degree of variety and endemicity. Some of the noteworthy species include mountain hawk-eagle, Sri Lanka junglefowl, Sri Lanka wood pigeon, jungle nightjar, Sri Lanka blue magpie, yellow-eared bulbul, brown-capped babbler, orange-billed babbler, dull-blue flycatcher, Sri Lanka bush warbler, Sri Lanka whistling thrush, spot-winged thrush, common blackbird, and Sri Lanka white-eye. All five species of bird which are strictly endemic to this ecoregion are present in the reserve. Common birds are scarlet minivet, small minivet, black bulbul, Sri Lanka scimitar babbler, grey-headed canary-flycatcher, pied bushchat, and Sri Lanka scaly thrush. Indian pitta, Asian brown flycatcher, Kashmir flycatcher, Indian blue robin, pied thrush, black-throated munia, and large-billed leaf warbler are amongst the large number of migratory species.

Many endemic amphibians including Taruga eques, Adenomus kelaartii, Polypedates cruciger, Philautus microtympanum, Philautus schmarda, Ramanella palmata, and Microhyla zeylanica together with Fejervarya limnocharis and bronzed frog inhabit the reserve. Notable reptiles include Uropeltis melanogaster, Rhinophis blythii, Aspidura brachyorrhos, A. trachyprocta, Hypnale nepa, geckos such as Calotes nigrilabris, Cophotis ceylanica, rhino horn lizard, and skink species Sphenomorphus striatopunctatum.

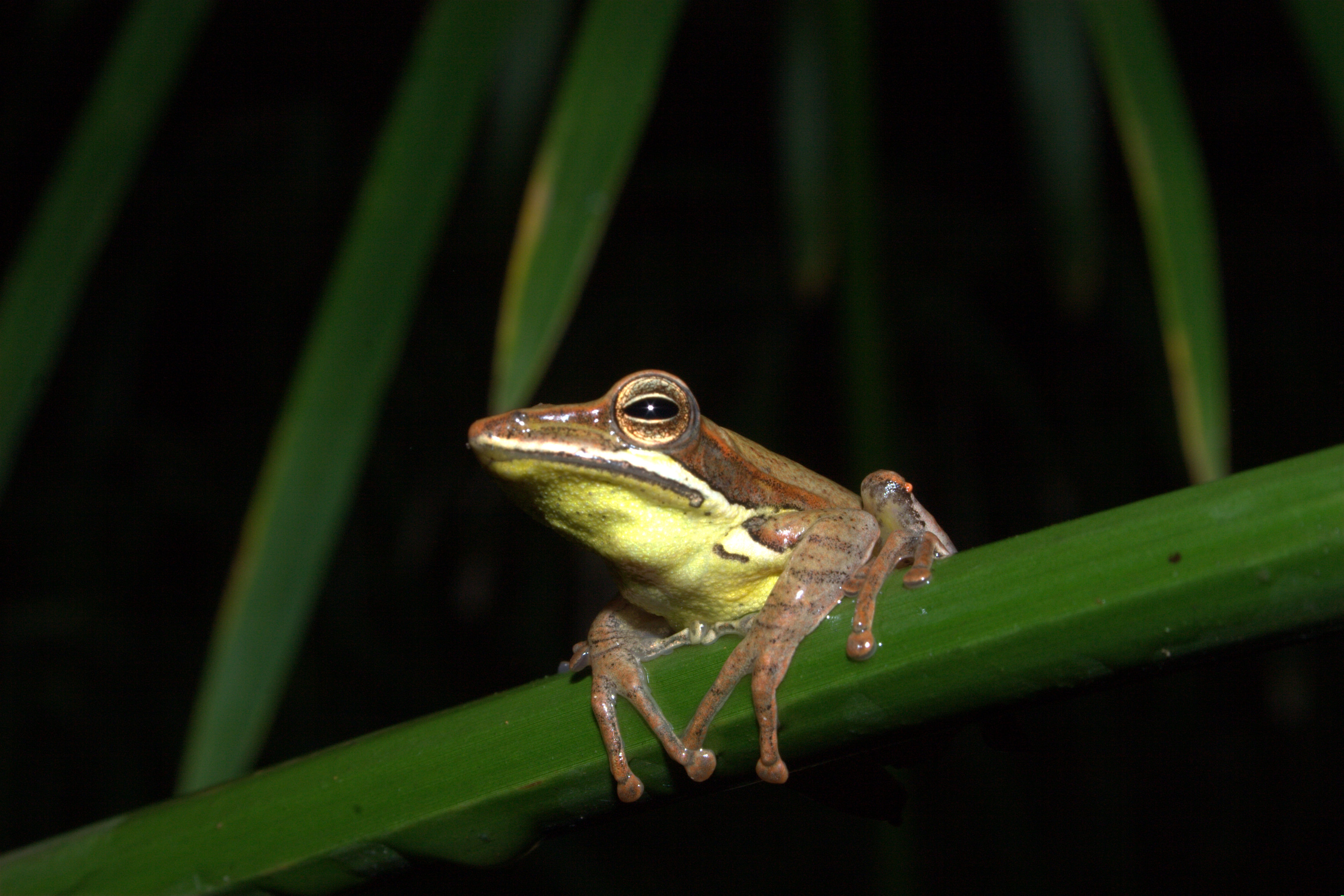
Endemic Taruga eques in Hakgala Strict Nature Reserve

== Conservation ==
Cloud forest die back and secondary growth of them in Hakgala Strict Nature Reserve

Hakgala reserve is an important and isolated cloud forest, which supports a number of endemics; however, its small size and isolation is jeopardizing its long-term survival. Illegal logging by the farmers and dieback of the forest are the two major threats to the reserve. The reserve is one of the sites where academic research is conducted. One study conducted within the reserve has revealed that soil toxicity is a probable cause of forest dieback. In addition to the above factors it is known that up to 25 percent of the area of the reserve has been encroached upon.

== See also ==
- Protected areas of Sri Lanka
