= Gemunu =

Gemunu may refer to

- Gemunu Watch, an infantry regiment of the Sri Lanka Army
- Gemunu Kulatunge, Sri Lankan general
- Gemunu Wijesuriya, Sri Lankan broadcaster, comedian, singer and radio producer
- Maharaja Gemunu, a 2015 Sri Lankan film
- Cnemaspis gemunu, a species of gecko endemic to Sri Lanka
