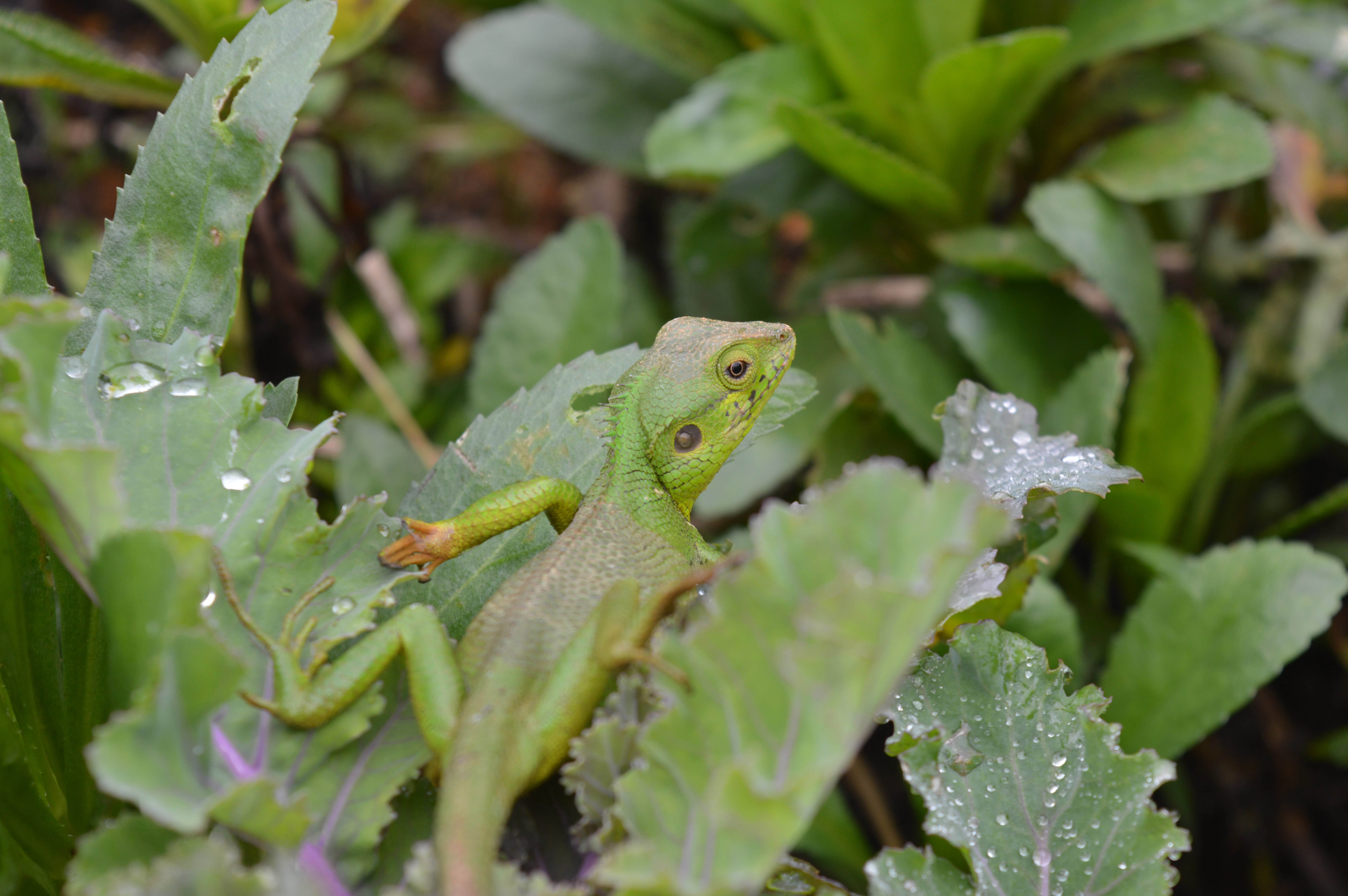
- Female

Scientific classification
- Kingdom: Animalia
- Phylum: Chordata
- Class: Reptilia
- Order: Squamata
- Suborder: Iguania
- Family: Agamidae
- Genus: Calotes
- Species: C. nigrilabris

Binomial name
- Calotes nigrilabris Peters, 1860

= Calotes nigrilabris =

Species of lizard

Calotes nigrilabris, the black-cheek lizard, is an agamid species endemic to Sri Lanka. It can be distinguished easily from painted-lipped lizard by having black bar on mouth rather than white or orange bar.In Sinhalese language, it is known as "Kalu Kopul Katussa - කළු කොපුල් කටුස්සා"

== Distribution ==
A submontane and montane species, found at elevations of 1,000 m (3,300 ft) and above. This species is tolerably common at localities such as Nuwara Eliya, Pattipola, Ohiya, Hakgala Strict Nature Reserve, Horton Plains National Park, Peak Wilderness Sanctuary, Kandapola, Ragala, Labukele, Knuckles, Pidurutalagala, Kuda Oya, Labugolla

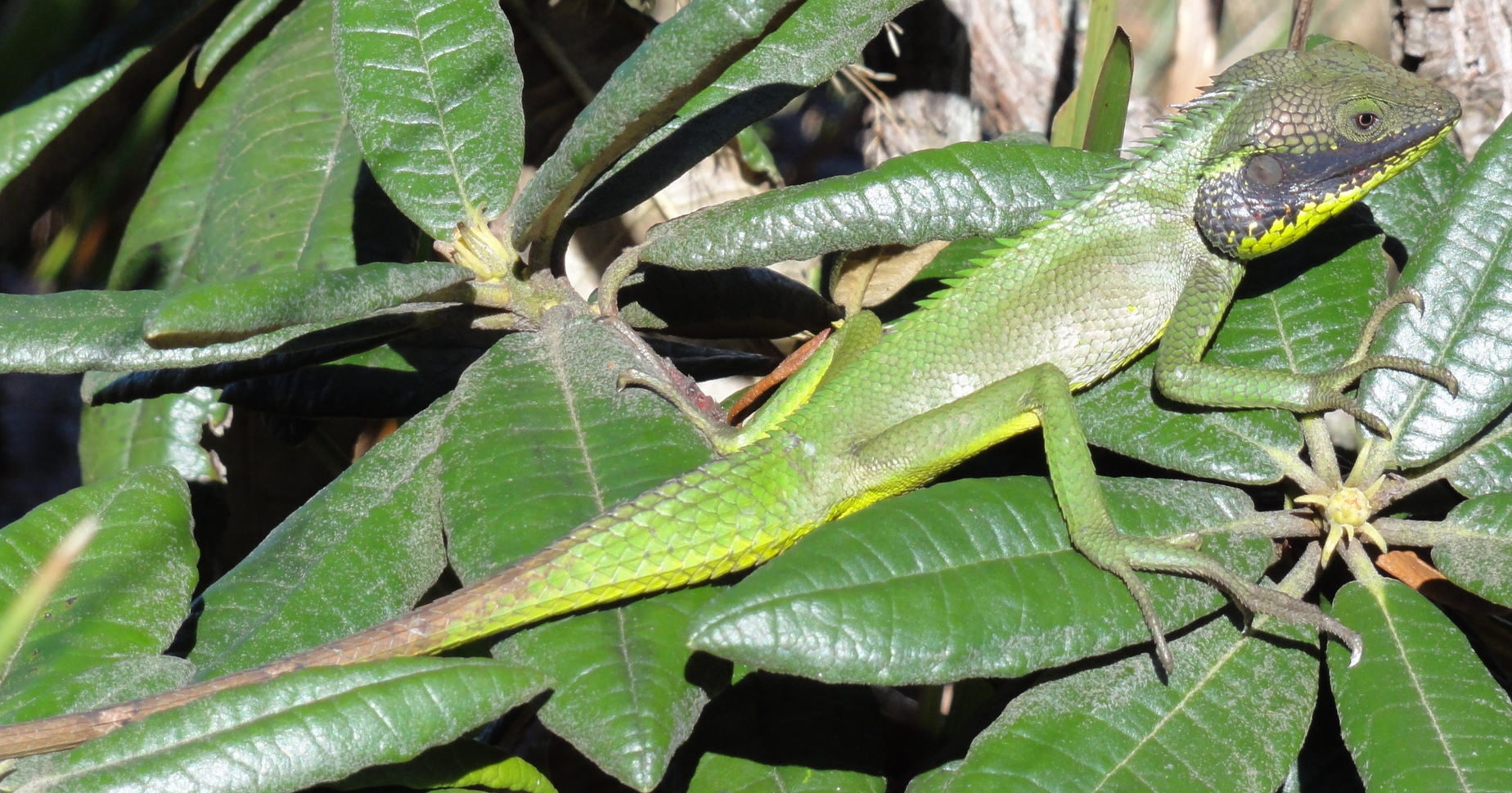
C. nigrilabris

== Description ==
Head is one and a half times width. A row of spines above and at the back of tympanum. Adult male is with swollen cheeks. Gular sacs are not developed. Mid body scale rows are 42–50. Ventrals are larger than dorsals. Dorsum is green unpatterned or with black edged, cream transverse bars or eye-like spots. Head with black markings. Venter is pale green.

== Ecology ==
This species is largely arboreal, inhabiting tree trunks, hedges, and shrubs, where it hunts for insects and worms by day. In Horton Plains C. nigrilabris can be found residing on the gorse bushes (Ulex europeus) and Rhododendron leaves to hunt the insect prey (particularly bees) that gets attracted to the flowers.

== Reproduction ==
Lays up to 4 eggs, measuring 17–23 mm in length and 10–13 mm in width. Hatchlings have mean SVL of 35–50 mm. Two breeding seasons can be observed from November–December and February to March. Hatchlings can be observed following the egg laying in the breeding months after an approximate two months of incubation.
