= Edward Blyth =

English zoologist and pharmacist

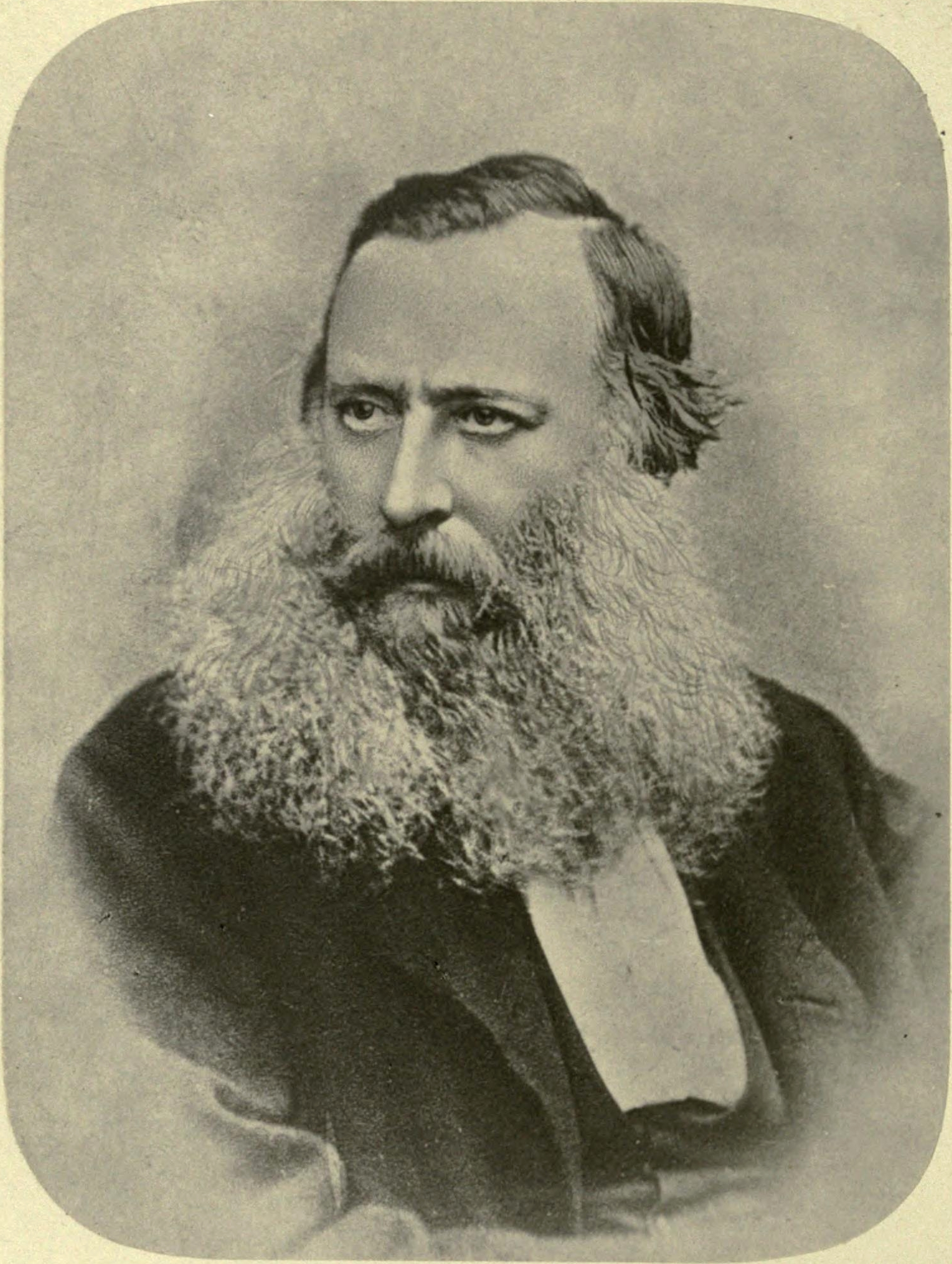
- Born: 23 December 1810; London, England
- Died: 27 December 1873 (aged 63); London, England
- Resting place: Highgate Cemetery, North London
- Known for: Catalogue of the Birds of the Asiatic Society, 1849; The natural history of the Cranes 1881
- Scientific career
- Fields: Zoology
- Workplaces: Museum of the Royal Asiatic Society of Bengal, Kolkata
- Author abbrev. (zoology): Blyth

Edward Blyth (23 December 1810 – 27 December 1873) was an English zoologist who worked for most of his life in India as a curator of zoology at the Royal Asiatic Society of Bengal in Calcutta (now Kolkata). He catalogued the specimens in the collection in his Catalogue of the Birds of the Asiatic Society in 1849. He did not collect specimens himself but received and described bird specimens from A.O. Hume, Samuel Tickell, Robert Swinhoe among others. His Natural History of the Cranes was published posthumously in 1881.

== Early life and work ==
On 23 December 1810, Blyth was born in London. His father, a cloth merchant, died in 1820 and his mother sent him to Dr. Fennell's school in Wimbledon. He took an interest in reading, but was often to be found spending time in the woods nearby. Leaving school in 1825, he went to study chemistry, at the suggestion of Dr. Fennell, in London under Dr. Keating at St. Paul's Churchyard. He did not find the teaching satisfactory and began to work as a pharmacist in Tooting, but quit in 1837 to try his luck as an author and editor. In 1836, he produced an annotated edition of Gilbert White's Natural History of Selborne which was reprinted in 1858.

When Blyth was still in England, he tried to visit the British Museum collection for his studies. He found the ornithologist George Robert Gray, keeper at the British Museum, uncooperative in helping him with his ornithological research. He complained to the trustees of the museum but it was dismissed with several character references in favour of Gray including Charles Darwin. Gray noted that Blyth had sought to pluck a feather out of a specimen of a Polyborus.

He was offered the position of curator at the museum of the Asiatic Society of Bengal in 1841. He was so poor that he needed an advance of 100 pounds sterling|pounds to make the trip to Calcutta. In India, Blyth was poorly paid (the Asiatic Society did not expect to find a European curator for the salary that they could offer), with a salary of 300 pounds per year (which was unchanged for twenty years), and a house allowance of 4 pounds per month. He married in 1854, and tried to supplement his income by writing under a pseudonym (Zoophilus) for the Indian Sporting Review, and traded live animals between India and Britain to wealthy collectors in both countries. In this venture he sought the collaboration of eminent people such as Charles Darwin and John Gould, both of whom declined these offers.

Although a curator of a museum with many responsibilities, he contributed mainly to ornithology, often ignoring the rest of his work. In 1847, his employers were unhappy at his failure to produce a catalogue of the museum. Some Asiatic Society factions opposed Blyth, and he complained to Richard Owen in 1848:

They intrigue in every way to get rid of me; accuse me of being an Ornithologist, and that the society did not want an ornithologist...I could astonish you by various statements of what I have to put up with but forbear.

— quoted in Brandon-Jones, 1997

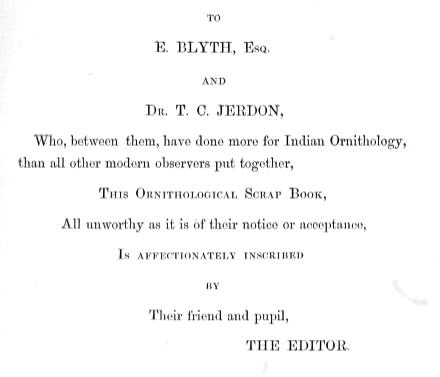
Dedication page of Hume's "My Scrapbook" (1869)

Blyth's work on ornithology led him to be recognized as the father of Indian ornithology a title later transferred to Allan Octavian Hume.

Mr. Blyth, who is rightly called the Father of Indian Ornithology, was by far the most important contributor to our knowledge of the Birds of India. As the head of the Asiatic Society's Museum, by intercourse and correspondence, formed a large collection for the Society, and enriched the pages of the Society's Journal with the results of his study. Thus he did more for the study of the birds of India than all previous writers. There can be no work on Indian Ornithology without reference to his voluminous contributions. ...

— James Murray

He married a widow, Mrs. Hodges (born Sutton) who had moved to India, in 1854. She however died in December 1857, a shock which led to his health deteriorating from then on.

== On natural selection ==
Edward Blyth wrote three articles on variation, discussing the effects of artificial selection and describing the process in nature as restoring organisms in the wild to their archetype (rather than forming new species). However, he never actually used the term "natural selection". These articles were published in The Magazine of Natural History between 1835 and 1837.

In February 1855 Charles Darwin, seeking information on variations in domesticated animals of various countries, wrote to Blyth who was "much gratified to learn that a subject in which I have always felt the deepest interest has been undertaken by one so competent to treat of it in all its bearings" and they corresponded on the subject. Blyth was among the first to recognise the significance of Alfred Russel Wallace's paper "On the Law which has regulated the introduction of Species" and brought it to the notice of Darwin in a letter written in Calcutta on 8 December 1855:

"What think you of Wallace's paper in the Ann. M. N. H. ? Good! Upon the whole! ... Wallace has, I think, put the matter well; and according to his theory, the various domestic races of animals have been fairly developed into species. ... A trump of a fact for friend Wallace to have hit upon!"

There can be no doubt of Darwin's regard for Edward Blyth: in the first chapter of On the Origin of Species he wrote "Mr. Blyth, whose opinion, from his large and varied stores of knowledge, I should value more than that of almost any one, ..."

In 1911, H.M. Vickers considered Blyth's writings as an early understanding of natural selection which was noted in a 1959 paper, where Loren Eiseley claimed that "the leading tenets of Darwin's work – the struggle for existence, variation, natural selection and sexual selection – are all fully expressed in Blyth's paper of 1835". He also cited a number of rare words, similarities of phrasing, and the use of similar examples, which he regarded as evidence of Darwin's debt to Blyth. However, the subsequent discovery of Darwin's notebooks has "permitted the refutation of Eiseley's claims". Eiseley argued that Blyth's influence on Darwin "begins to be discernible in the Darwin Note-book of 1836 with the curious word 'inosculate'. It is a word which has never had a wide circulation, and which is not to be found in Darwin's vocabulary before this time." This was incorrect: an 1832 letter written by Darwin commented that William Sharp Macleay "never imagined such an inosculating creature". The letter preceded Blyth's publication, and indicates that both Darwin and Blyth had independently taken the term from Macleay whose Quinarian system of classification had been popular for a time after its first publication in 1819–1820. In a mystical scheme this grouped separately created genera in "osculating" (kissing) circles.

Both Ernst Mayr and Cyril Darlington interpret Blyth's view of natural selection as maintaining the type:

"Blyth's theory was clearly one of elimination rather than selection. His principal concern is the maintenance of the perfection of the type. Blyth's thinking is decidedly that of a natural theologian..."
"What was the work of Blyth?... Blyth attempts to show how [selection and the struggle for existence] can be used to explain, not the change of species (which he was anxious to discredit) but the stability of species in which he ardently believed."

In this negative formulation, natural selection only preserves a constant and unchangeable type or essence of created form, by eliminating extreme variations or unfit individuals that deviate too far from this essence. The formulation goes back to the ancient Greek philosopher Empedocles, and the theologian William Paley set out a variation on this argument in 1802, to refute (in later pages) a claim that there had been a wide range of initial creations, with less viable forms eliminated by nature to leave the modern range of species:

"The hypothesis teaches, that every possible variety of being hath, at one time or other, found its way into existence (by what cause or in what manner is not said), and that those which were badly formed, perished; but how or why those which survived should be cast, as we see that plants and animals are cast, into regular classes, the hypothesis does not explain; or rather the hypothesis is inconsistent with this phænomenon."

The way Blyth himself argued about the modification of species can be illustrated by an extract concerning the adaptations of carnivorous mammals:

"However reciprocal...may appear the relations of the preyer and the prey, a little reflection on the observed facts suffices to intimate that the relative adaptations of the former only are special, those of latter being comparatively vague and general; indicating that there having been a superabundance which might serve as nutriment, in the first instance, and which, in many cases, was unattainable by ordinary means, particular species have therefore been so organized (that is to say, modified upon some more or less general type or plan of structure,) to avail themselves of the supply."

Stephen Jay Gould writes that Eiseley erred in failing to realize that natural selection was a common idea among biologists of the time, as part of the argument for created permanency of species. It was seen as eliminating the unfit, while some other cause created well-fitted species. Darwin introduced the idea that natural selection was creative in giving direction to a process of evolutionary change in which small hereditary changes accumulate. John Wilkins indicates that Blyth considered that species had "invariable distinctions" establishing their integrity, and so was opposed to transmutation of species as if it occurred, "we should seek in vain for those constant and invariable distinctions which are found to obtain". Darwin held the opposite view, and did not read Blyth until after formulating his own theory. In contrast to Eiseley's claim that Blyth felt that Darwin had plagiarised the idea, Blyth remained a valued correspondent and friend of Darwin's after the idea was published.

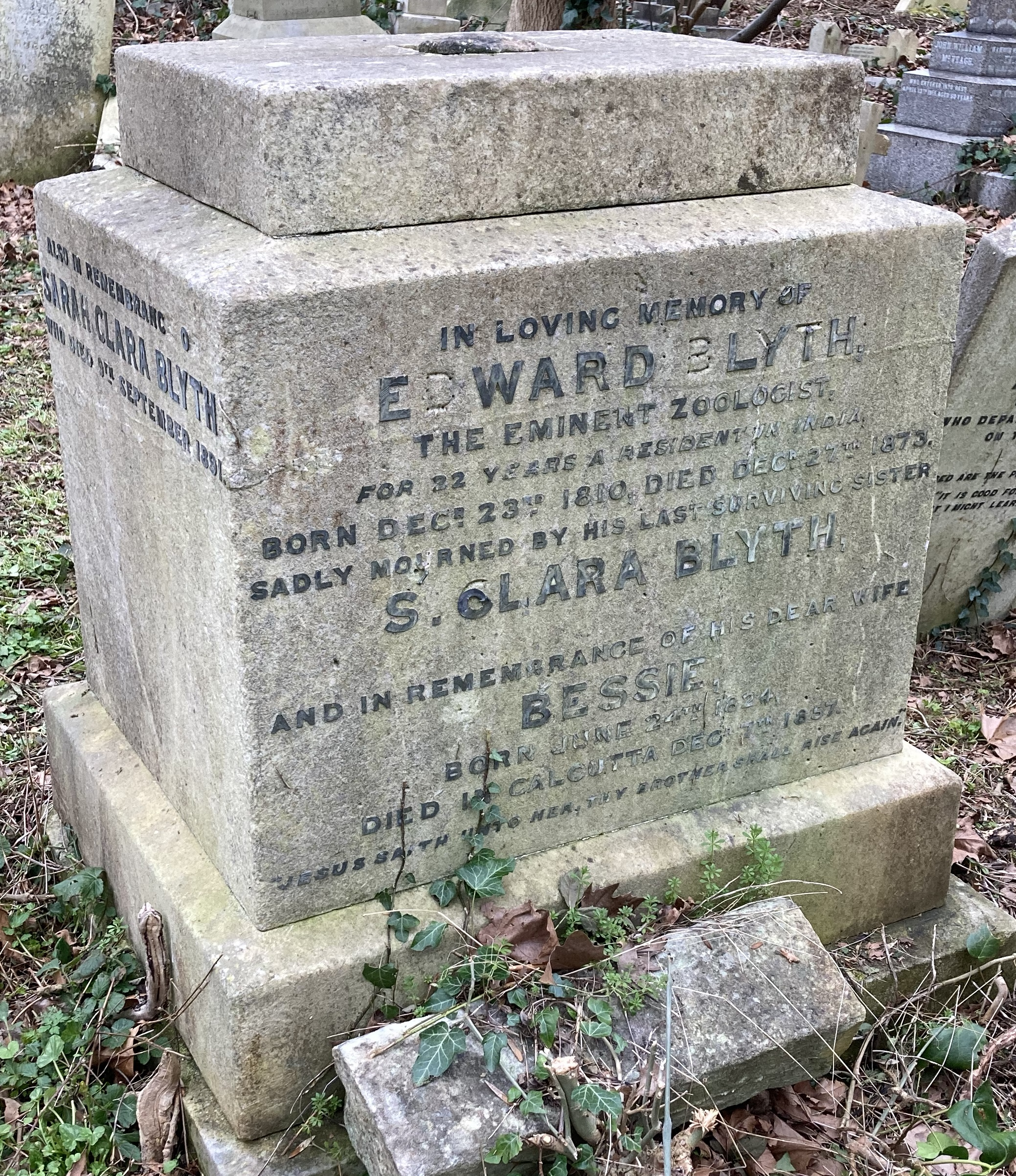
Family grave of Edward Blyth in Highgate Cemetery (west side)

== Return from India ==
Blyth returned to London on 9 March 1863 to recover from ill health, in the care of his sister Sarah Clara Blyth. He was to get a full year's pay for this sick leave. He however had to borrow money from John Henry Gurney and continued his animal trade.

Around 1865, he began to help Thomas C. Jerdon in the writing of the Birds of India but had a mental breakdown and had to be kept in a private asylum. He was a corresponding member of the Zoological Society and was elected an extraordinary member of the British Ornithological Union, nominated by Alfred Newton. He later took to drinking and was once held for assaulting a cab driver. He died of heart disease on 27 December 1873 and is buried in a family grave in Highgate Cemetery.

== Other works ==
Although Blyth spent most of his time in the museum in India, he was aware and interested in the study of birds in life. Prior to moving to India, he conducted some experiments to examine if cuckoo eggs (or more generally foreign eggs) were detected and removed by the hosts by placing eggs of one species in the nests of others. In 1835 he wrote that he had experimentally found chaffinches to remove a foreign egg when placed in their clutch. He also suggested the idea of replacing the original clutch with another clutch but with a single foreign egg and suggested based on his own results that either the foreign eggs would be discarded or that the birds would abandon the nest. Blyth also examined the patterns of moult in various bird groups.

Blyth edited the section on "Mammalia, Birds, and Reptiles" in the English edition of Cuvier's Animal Kingdom published in 1840, inserting many observations, corrections, and references of his own. His Catalogue of the mammals and birds of Burma was published posthumously in 1875.

Working in the scientific field of herpetology, from 1853 through 1863, he described over three dozen new species of reptiles and several new species of amphibians.

== Eponymous taxa ==
Avian species bearing his name include Blyth's hornbill, Blyth's leaf warbler, Blyth's hawk-eagle, Blyth's olive bulbul, Blyth's parakeet, Blyth's frogmouth, Blyth's reed warbler, Blyth's rosefinch, Blyth's shrike-babbler, Blyth's tragopan, Blyth's pipit, and Blyth's kingfisher. Reptilian species and a genus bearing his name include Blythia reticulata, Eumeces blythianus, and Rhinophis blythii.
