= Cnemaspis kivulegedarai =

Scientific classification
- Kingdom: Animalia
- Phylum: Chordata
- Class: Reptilia
- Order: Squamata
- Suborder: Gekkota
- Family: Gekkonidae
- Genus: Cnemaspis
- Species: C. kivulegedarai

Binomial name
- Cnemaspis kivulegedarai Silva, Bauer, Botejue, Ukuwela, Gabadage, Gorin, Poyarkov, Surasinghe & Karunarathna, 2019

Species of lizard

Cnemaspis kivulegedarai, or Kivulegedaras' day gecko, is a species of diurnal gecko endemic to island of Sri Lanka.

== Etymology ==
The specific name kivulegedarai is named in honor of Sri Lankan warrior Kivulegedara Mohottala, who is a national hero fought in the Great Rebellion of 1817–1818 occurred in Uva-Wellassa against British rule. It was the third Kandyan War led by Keppetipola Disawe.

== Taxonomy ==
The species is closely related to C. latha.

== Ecology ==
The species was discovered from area lies between 500–750 meters above sea level of Keerthibandarapura area. Individuals are restricted to rock outcrops and granite caves in forested areas. It is sympatric with Gehyra mutilata, Hemidactylus depressus, H. frenatus and H. parvimaculatus. Researchers identified the species is Critically Endangered due to low numbers and density only recorded from four locations.

== Description ==
An adult male is 28.5 mm long. Dorsum homogeneous with smooth granular scales. Chin with smooth granules whereas gular, pectoral and abdominal scales are smooth. There are 19 belly scales across mid body. Tubercles on posterior flank are weakly developed. Para vertebral granules linearly arranged. Body short and slender. Head large and depressed. Snout relatively long. Pupil round. Head, body and limbs are orange-brown dorsally. There are five faded, irregular brown on trunk with seven to eight cream vertebral blotches. There is an oblique black line between eye and nostrils. Tail grey-brown with 9–11 irregular W-shaped faded brown cross-bands.

== Media controversy ==
Several Sri Lankan media as well many parliamentarians criticized the usage of popular people's name for specific name. The argument was largely due to unknowing about binomial nomenclature in zoological taxonomy among people. They indicated that the usage of heroes' names gives by equating the national heroes to geckos. However, researchers neglect that sentence and explained that the name is given only to honor the personality.
