= Cnemaspis kawminiae =

Scientific classification
- Kingdom: Animalia
- Phylum: Chordata
- Class: Reptilia
- Order: Squamata
- Suborder: Gekkota
- Family: Gekkonidae
- Genus: Cnemaspis
- Species: C. kawminiae

Binomial name
- Cnemaspis kawminiae Karunarathna, de Silva, Gabadage, Karunarathna, Wickramasinghe, Ukuwela & Bauer, 2019

Species of lizard

Cnemaspis kawminiae, or Kawmini's day gecko, is a species of diurnal gecko endemic to island of Sri Lanka, described in 2019 from Nuwara Eliya.

== Etymology ==
The specific name kawminiae is named in honor of Hadunneththi Kawmini Mendis, who is the mother of Suranjan Karunarathna.

== Taxonomy ==
The species is closely related to C. kumarasinghei and C. gotaimbarai morphological aspects.

== Ecology ==
The species was discovered from a granite cave in Mandaram Nuwara, closer to Pidurutalagala Mountain, Nuwara Eliya.

== Description ==
Snout-to-vent length is 33.7 mm in adult male and 35.2 mm in adult female.
