= Cyrtodactylus fraenatus =

Bridled bent-toed gecko

Scientific classification
- Kingdom: Animalia
- Phylum: Chordata
- Class: Reptilia
- Order: Squamata
- Suborder: Gekkota
- Family: Gekkonidae
- Genus: Cyrtodactylus
- Species: C. fraenatus

Binomial name
- Cyrtodactylus fraenatus Günther, 1864

Species of lizard

Cyrtodactylus fraenatus (bridled bent-toed gecko, Sri Lanka bent-toed gecko) is a species of gecko endemic to the island of Sri Lanka.

== Habitat and distribution ==
Cyrtodactylus fraenatus is a large forest gecko from the midhills of Sri Lanka. Known localities include Peradeniya, Gampola, Menikdena and Hakgala Strict Nature Reserve.

== Description ==
The head is large and broad. The tail is long, slender and longer than head-body length. Dorsal scales across mid-body between mid-ventral folds 35. Males with 4–6 pre-anal pores arranged at a wide angle. The dorsum is olive-brown or chocloate brown, with 4–5 large, W-shaped marks.

== Ecology and diet ==
It inhabits trees and other arboreal perches within forested habitats. Nocturnal, and also known to bask in direct sunlight.

== Reproduction ==
2 eggs measuring 15 * 17 mm are produced at a time.
