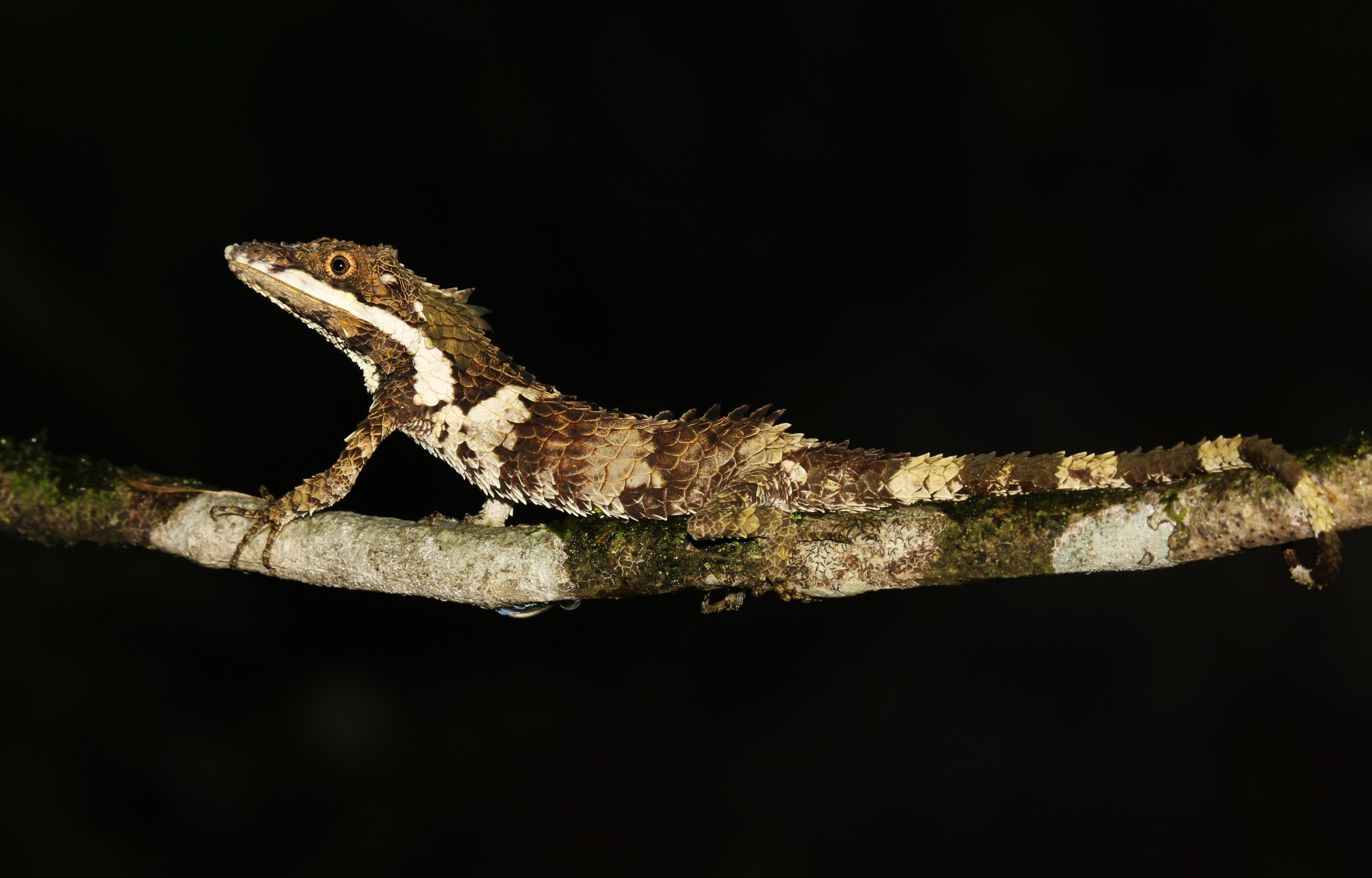

Scientific classification
- Kingdom: Animalia
- Phylum: Chordata
- Class: Reptilia
- Order: Squamata
- Suborder: Iguania
- Family: Agamidae
- Subfamily: Draconinae
- Genus: Cophotis; Peters, 1861

= Cophotis =

Genus of lizards

Cophotis is a genus of lizards in the family Agamidae, endemic to Sri Lanka.

== Species ==
Image	Scientific name	Common name	Distribution
	Cophotis ceylanica Peters, 1861	Ceylon deaf agama	Sri Lanka.
	Cophotis dumbara Samarawickrama, Ranawana, Rajapaksha, Ananjeva, Orlov, Ranasinghe, & Samarawickrama, 2006	Dumbara agama	Sri Lanka.
