= Syzygium rotundifolium =

Conservation status
- Vulnerable (IUCN 2.3)

Scientific classification
- Kingdom: Plantae
- Clade: Tracheophytes
- Clade: Angiosperms
- Clade: Eudicots
- Clade: Rosids
- Order: Myrtales
- Family: Myrtaceae
- Genus: Syzygium
- Species: S. rotundifolium

Binomial name
- Syzygium rotundifolium Arn.

Species of flowering plant

Syzygium rotundifolium is a species of flowering plant in the family Myrtaceae. It is a tree endemic to Sri Lanka.
