= Dendrelaphis wickrorum =

Scientific classification
- Kingdom: Animalia
- Phylum: Chordata
- Class: Reptilia
- Order: Squamata
- Suborder: Serpentes
- Family: Colubridae
- Subfamily: Ahaetuliinae
- Genus: Dendrelaphis
- Species: D. wickrorum

Binomial name
- Dendrelaphis wickrorum Danushka et al., 2020

Species of snake

Dendrelaphis wickrorum, commonly known as the Wickramasinghes bronzeback, is a species of arboreal snake endemic to Sri Lanka.

== Etymology ==
The specific name wickrorum is in honor of prominent herpetologist L. J. Mendis Wickramasinghe and his wife Nethu Wickramasinghe for their remarkable contributions to the field of herpetology in Sri Lanka. It was formerly considered to be Dendrelaphis bifrenalis.

== Taxonomy ==
The species is sympatric with other bronzeback species: D. sinharajensis, D. schokari and D. caudolineolatus in the wet zone. It was formerly confused with Dendrelaphis bifrenalis, but the dry-zone populations of Dendrelaphis bifrenalis are the real ones, and the wet-zone populations are Dendrelaphis wickrorum.

== Description ==
The largest specimen in the type series is a female measuring 110 cm (43.3 in) in total length, whereas the males are shorter, up to 79 cm (31.1 in).

== Distribution ==
The snake is found from forest areas of Pundaluoya, Kuda-Waskaduwa, Pinwatta-Panadura and Labugama.

== Ecology ==
Diurnal and predominantly arboreal that hunts in sub-canopy and the understory.
