= Cyrtodactylus cracens =

Conservation status
- Near Threatened (IUCN 3.1)

- Endangered (IUCN 3.1)

Scientific classification
- Kingdom: Animalia
- Phylum: Chordata
- Class: Reptilia
- Order: Squamata
- Suborder: Gekkota
- Family: Gekkonidae
- Genus: Cyrtodactylus
- Species: C. cracens

Binomial name
- Cyrtodactylus cracens Batuwita & Bahir, 2005

Synonyms
- Cyrtodactylus subsolanus Batuwita & Bahir, 2005

Species of lizard

Cyrtodactylus cracens is a species of gecko endemic to island of Sri Lanka.

== Habitat and distribution ==
Cyrtodactylus cracens is known from and around the Sinharaja Forest Reserve.

== Description ==
Cyrtodactylus cracens can grow to a snout–vent length of at least 105 mm (4.1 in). Dorsal tubercles are flattened, and claws long. Scales under fourth toe 7–10. Mental subtriangular, midbody scale rows 26–32. About 6–8 rows of dorsal tubercles at midbody. Scales on venter imbricate to subimbricate, with rounded posterior edges. A single series of 5 pre-anal pores in a shallow pre-cloacal depression.

== Ecology and diet ==
Inhabits small, cave-like rocky areas adjoining forest streams as well as tree trunks in forests and a cardamon plantation (former C. subsolanus).
