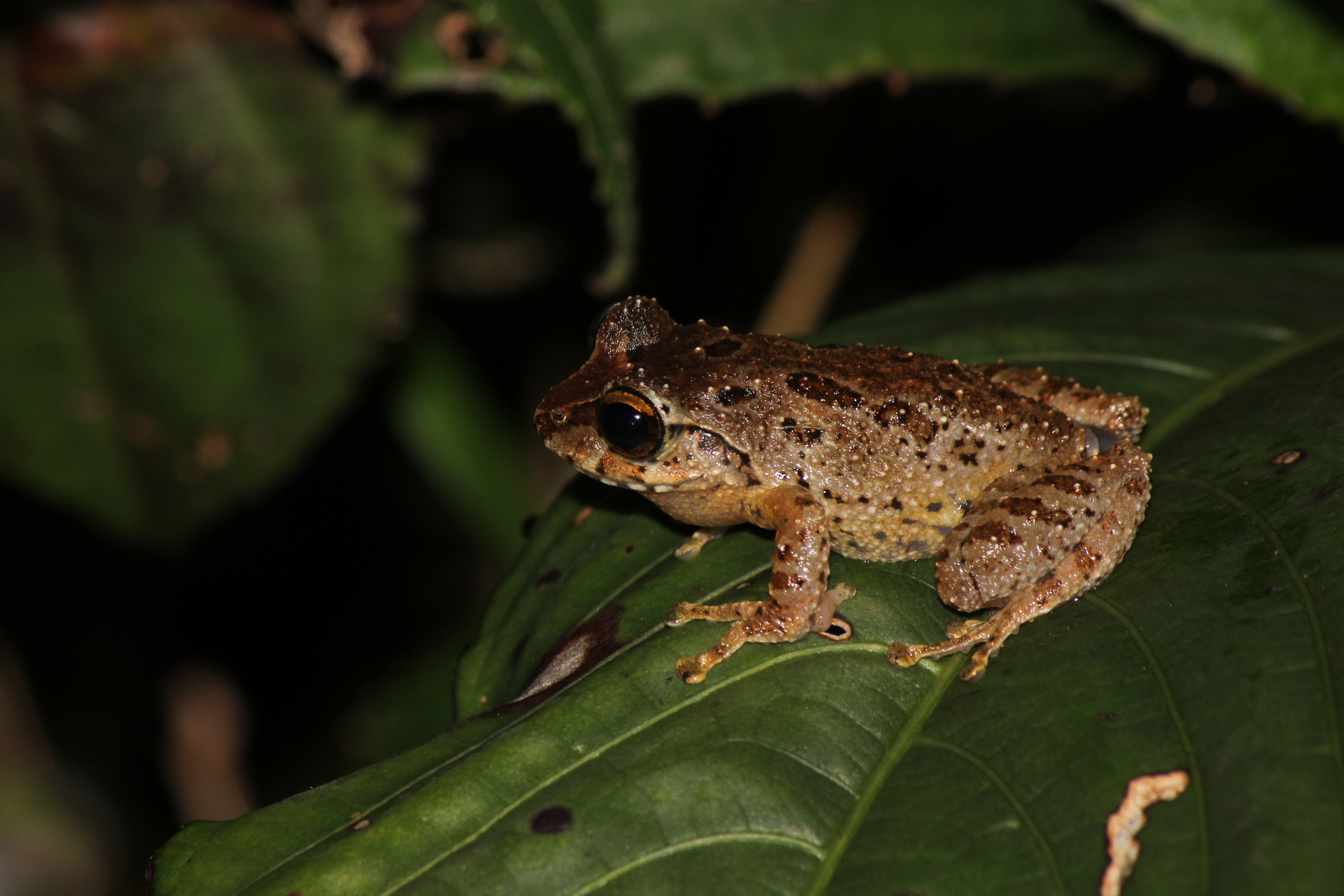

Conservation status
- Endangered (IUCN 3.1)

Scientific classification
- Kingdom: Animalia
- Phylum: Chordata
- Class: Amphibia
- Order: Anura
- Family: Rhacophoridae
- Genus: Pseudophilautus
- Species: P. microtympanum

Binomial name
- Pseudophilautus microtympanum (Günther, 1858)

Synonyms
- Polypedates microtympanum Günther, 1858; Philautus microtympanum (Günther, 1858)

= Pseudophilautus microtympanum =

Species of amphibian

Pseudophilautus microtympanum, also known as Gunther's bubble-nest frog or small-eared shrub frog, is a species of frog in the family Rhacophoridae. It is endemic to the central hills of Sri Lanka. Its natural habitat are both closed and open canopy habitats. Sub-adults and juveniles are more often found in grassland and disturbed habitats, whereas adult frogs are usually found in closed-canopy habitats. It is threatened by habitat loss, agrochemical pollution, and the desiccation of its habitat.
