= Cnemaspis pulchra =

Scientific classification
- Kingdom: Animalia
- Phylum: Chordata
- Class: Reptilia
- Order: Squamata
- Suborder: Gekkota
- Family: Gekkonidae
- Genus: Cnemaspis
- Species: C. pulchra

Binomial name
- Cnemaspis pulchra Manamendra-Arachchi, Batuwita & Pethiyagoda, 2007

Species of lizard

Cnemaspis pulchra is a species of diurnal gecko endemic to island of Sri Lanka.
