= Lankascincus taprobanensis =

Conservation status
- Endangered (IUCN 3.1)

Scientific classification
- Kingdom: Animalia
- Phylum: Chordata
- Class: Reptilia
- Order: Squamata
- Family: Scincidae
- Genus: Lankascincus
- Species: L. taprobanensis

Binomial name
- Lankascincus taprobanensis (Kelaart, 1854)
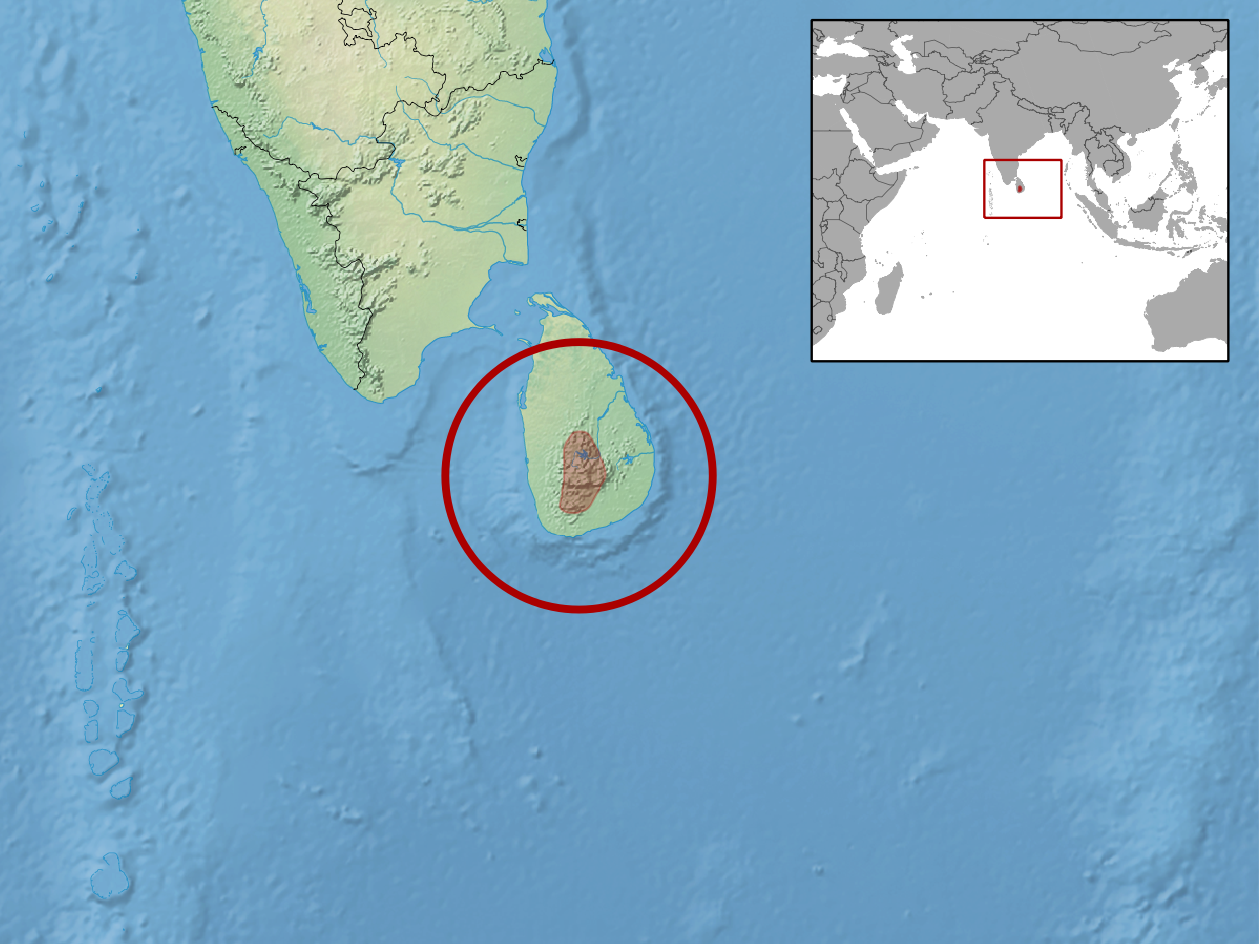

Synonyms
- Eumeces taprobanensis Kelaart, 1854; Lygosoma taprobanense — Boulenger, 1887; Sphenomorphus taprobanense — Taylor, 1953; Lankascincus taprobanensis — Greer, 1991; Lankascincus munindradasai Wickramasinghe et al., 2007

Species of lizard

Lankascincus taprobanensis, also known commonly as the Ceylon tree skink and the smooth Lanka skink, is a species of lizard in the subfamily Sphenomorphinae of the family Scincidae. The species is endemic to the island of Sri Lanka.

== Habitat and distribution ==
The smooth Lanka skink is found from 1,000 to 2,300 metres (3,300 to 7,500 ft) above sea level, and is the only skink found at the 2,300-metre (7,500 ft) elevation in Sri Lanka. It is common in the Horton Plains, Hakgala, Namunukula, and Nuwara Eliya.

== Description ==
The body of L. taprobanensis is stout, and the length of the tail is 1.3 to 1.5 times that of the body. The fronto-parietals are distinct. The parietals are in narrow contact. There are 24 to 27 rows of scales at midbody. There are 9 to 17 lamellae under the fourth toe. The dorsum is gray, reddish brown, brownish yellow, or olive-colored. Each scale has a median dark spot. There is a brownish black lateral stripe with yellowish cream flecks running from the eye to the base of the tail. The venter is lemon yellow. The throat is pale blue with a few scattered dark spots. The Iris is very dark brown-colored.

== Ecology and diet ==
The diet of the Ceylon tree skink includes insects.

== Reproduction ==
An adult female of L. taprobanensis may lay one to two eggs, each measuring 7 by 12.5 millimetres (0.28 by 0.49 in), per clutch in loose soil. Hatchlings measure 19 millimetres (0.75 in).
