= Mandaram Nuwara =

Mandaram Nuwara Mandaramnuwara
- Village
- Location within Sri Lanka
- Coordinates: 7°4′30″N 80°47′29″E
- Country: Sri Lanka
- Province: Central Province

Population (2012)
  - Total: 550
- Time zone: UTC+5:30 (Sri Lanka Standard Time)
- Postal code: 20744

Mandaram Nuwara (Sinhala: මන්දාරම්නුවර), also known as Mandaramnuwara, is a small village situated at the foot of Pidurutalagala (Mount Pedro) in the Central Province of Sri Lanka. The village is also known colloquially as the 'Misty City' as it is shadowed by the adjoining mountain ranges and is shrouded in mist for the majority of the day.

There are a number of waterfalls located near Mandaram Nuwara, including:

- Elamulla Ella
- Kabara-gala Ella
- Digala Hinna Ella
- Kalu Palam Ella
- Kolapathana Ella

== See also ==
- List of towns in Central Province, Sri Lanka
