= Cyrtodactylus soba =

Scientific classification
- Kingdom: Animalia
- Phylum: Chordata
- Class: Reptilia
- Order: Squamata
- Suborder: Gekkota
- Family: Gekkonidae
- Genus: Cyrtodactylus
- Species: C. soba

Binomial name
- Cyrtodactylus soba Batuwita & Bahir, 2005

Species of lizard

Cyrtodactylus soba, also known as the Dumbara bent-toed gecko or Knuckles bent-toed gecko, is a species of gecko endemic to island of Sri Lanka.

== Habitat & Distribution ==
A bent-toed gecko found only from Knuckles Mountain Range of Sri Lanka.

== Description ==
Head is not depressed. Snout short. Body robust. Lamellae under fourth toe are 6-7. Claws are short. Mental subpentagonal, with concave posterior lateral borders. Dorsal scales across mid-body between ventro-lateral folds, 61-72. Tubercles on para-vertebral row are 225-31. Longitudinal rows of tubercles range from 7-10. Ventral scales imbricate with pointed posterior edges. Tail is long, slender and subcylindrical. Dorsum grayish brown with 5 dark brown bands. A dark canthal stripe with same color found that meets on nape. Flanks with a marbled pattern is found. Forehead with dark spots.

== Ecology ==
Found in cardamom barns and from walls of tea plantation estates buildings, and also from tree trunks in densely shaded areas and rock caves. Feeds on insects and their larvae.

== Reproduction ==
Lays 2 large spherical eggs of diameter 18 * 15mm within tree holes, rock crevices or spaces between bricks, in abandoned houses during June - August. Hatchlings measure 38-41mm and emerge in August and September.
