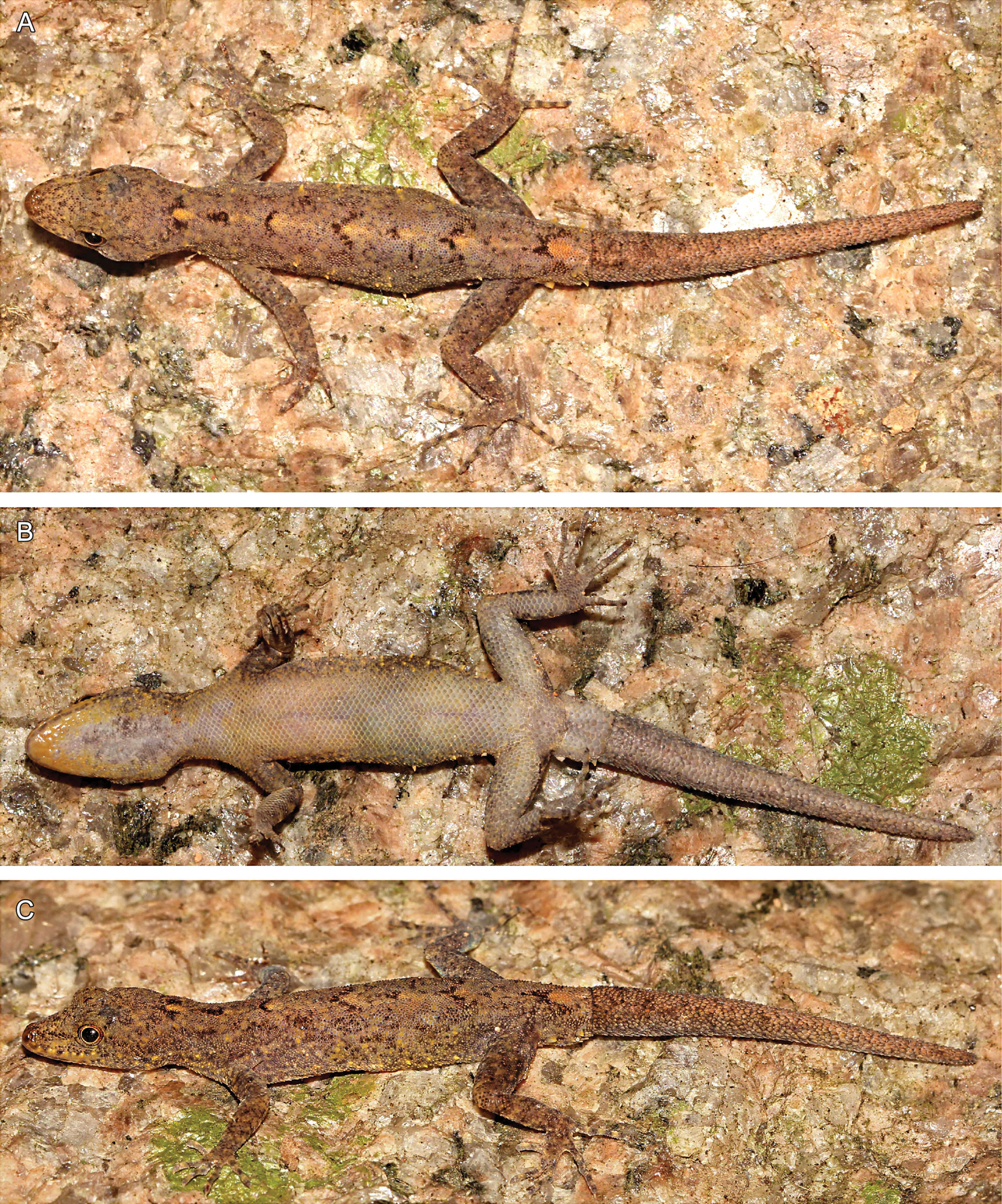
- Male holotype

Scientific classification
- Kingdom: Animalia
- Phylum: Chordata
- Class: Reptilia
- Order: Squamata
- Suborder: Gekkota
- Family: Gekkonidae
- Genus: Cnemaspis
- Species: C. lokugei

Binomial name
- Cnemaspis lokugei Karunarathna, de Silva, Gabadage, Botejue, Madawala, and Ukuwela, 2021

= Cnemaspis lokugei =

Species of lizard

Cnemaspis lokugei, or Lokuge's day gecko, is a species of diurnal gecko endemic to island of Sri Lanka.

== Etymology ==
The specific name lokugei is named in honor of Ajith Nethkelum Lokuge, who is a prominent ecologist, analogue forestry specialist and a senior member of Young Zoologist's Association (YZA) of Sri Lanka.

== Taxonomy ==
The species belongs to the Cnemaspis kandiana clade and closely related to C. podihuna.

== Ecology ==
The species was discovered from a granite cave bordering a stream, Haputale, Badulla District. Later several specimens were recorded from granite rock caves of Idalgashinna which received rainfall during the southwest monsoon.

== Description ==
The holotype, an adult male, measures 33 mm (1.3 in), while the two female paratypes measure 30–31 mm (1.2–1.2 in) in snout–vent length. Dorsum heterogeneous with smooth and keeled large granular scales. Chin, gular, pectoral and abdominal scales are smooth. There are 15–17 belly scales across mid body. Nostrils are oval and dorsolaterally orientated. Body short and slender. Head large and depressed. Snout relatively long. Pupil round and iris yellow. Head, body and limbs are reddish-brown with a dorsal yellow spot with black outer edge on neck. A faded, yellow broken vertebral stripe runs from occiput to tail. Chin and gular scales are yellow with dark spots. Tail dark brown.
