= Cnemaspis kumarasinghei =

Conservation status
- Endangered (IUCN 3.1)

Scientific classification
- Kingdom: Animalia
- Phylum: Chordata
- Class: Reptilia
- Order: Squamata
- Suborder: Gekkota
- Family: Gekkonidae
- Genus: Cnemaspis
- Species: C. kumarasinghei

Binomial name
- Cnemaspis kumarasinghei Wickramasinghe & Munindradasa, 2007

Species of lizard

Cnemaspis kumarasinghei, commonly known as Kumarasinghe's day gecko, is a species of lizard in the family Gekkonidae. The species is endemic to the island of Sri Lanka.

== Etymology ==
The specific name, kumarasinghei, is in honor of Sri Lankan wildlife ranger Siril Kumarasinghe, who was killed in the line of duty in 2007.

== Description ==
C. kumarasinghei is small for its genus. Adult males have a snout-to-vent length (SVL) of 28–32 mm (1.1–1.3 in).

== Geographic range ==
C. kumarasinghei is found in Monaragala District, Sri Lanka.

== Habitat ==
The preferred natural habitat of C. kumarasinghe is forest and rock faces within forest, at altitudes of 200–1,000 m (660–3,280 ft).

== Behavior ==
C. kumarasinghei is arboreal and crepuscular.

== Reproduction ==
C. kumarasinghei is oviparous. Clutch size is two eggs.
