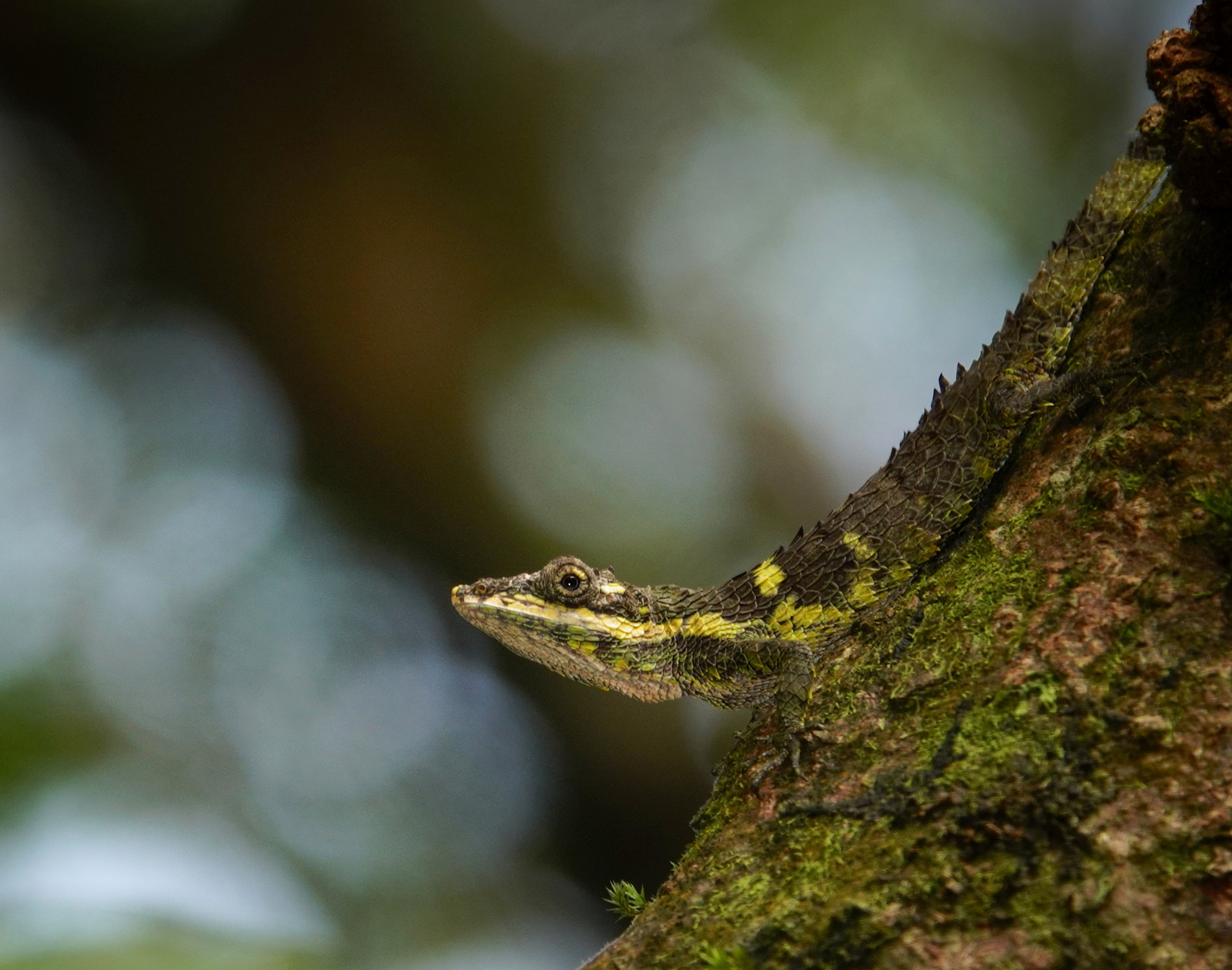

Conservation status
- Critically Endangered (IUCN 3.1)
- CITES Appendix I

Scientific classification
- Kingdom: Animalia
- Phylum: Chordata
- Class: Reptilia
- Order: Squamata
- Suborder: Iguania
- Family: Agamidae
- Genus: Cophotis
- Species: C. dumbara

Binomial name
- Cophotis dumbara Samarawickrama, Ranawana, Rajapaksha, Ananjeva, Orlov, Ranasinghe & Samarawickrama, 2006

Synonyms
- Cophotis dumbarae, Manamendra-Arachchi, de Silva & Amarasinghe, 2006

= Cophotis dumbara =

Knuckles pygmy lizard

Species of lizard

Cophotis dumbara, the Dumbara agama, is an agamid species endemic to Sri Lanka. Known only from Knuckles Mountain Range. It is classified as a critically endangered species due to habitat loss and logging.

== Description ==
Adult reaches 60.0 mm SVL in length. 111–120 mid-ventral scales. Head rhomboid dorsally. Orbital rim not prominent. Supraorbital ridge with a row of large, carinate scales. There is a supraorbital ridge with a row of large, carinate scales. Nasal scale pentagonal. Supraciliary scales carinate and elongate. Tympanum subdermal. Chest scales triangular.

Male has a pale greenish yellow on upper lip. Lower lip dark greenish black. A light greenish-yellow band extends from snout tip to axilla. Blackish loreal and temporal regions with light greenish yellow scales. Pupil black. Iris blackish with golden pigments. Dorsal crest black, which contain pale green patches. Middle part of throat is reddish orange. Tail consists of seven greenish yellow and seven black cross-bands.

Female has a buff colored throat with longitudinal brown streaks. Upper and lower lips light brown with black patches. Tail consists of seven greenish buff and eight brown cross-bands.
