= Cnemaspis dissanayakai =

Scientific classification
- Kingdom: Animalia
- Phylum: Chordata
- Class: Reptilia
- Order: Squamata
- Suborder: Gekkota
- Family: Gekkonidae
- Genus: Cnemaspis
- Species: C. dissanayakai

Binomial name
- Cnemaspis dissanayakai Karunarathna, de Silva, Madawala, Karunarathna, Wickramasinghe, Ukuwela & Bauer, 2019

Species of lizard

Cnemaspis dissanayakai, or Dissanayaka's day gecko, is a species of diurnal gecko endemic to island of Sri Lanka, described in 2019 from Polonnaruwa.

== Etymology ==
The specific name dissanayakai is named in honor of Dissanayaka Mudiyanselage Karunarathna, who is the father of Suranjan Karunarathna, first author. His father supported the research team financially as well as encourage them including his son.

== Taxonomy ==
The species is closely related to C. kumarasinghei and C. latha morphological aspects.

== Ecology ==
The species was discovered from a tropical dry-mixed evergreen forest in Dimbulagala, Polonnaruwa.

== Description ==
Snout-to-vent length is 28.2 mm in adult male and 29.4 mm in adult female. Granular scales are subconical. Chin, gular, pectoral, and abdominal scales are smooth. There are 105–107 paravertebral granules. Two precloacal pore is present. In males, 4–5 femoral pores are present. Median row of subcaudal scales are irregular, diamond-shaped, and small. Head is small with long snout. Small eyes have round pupils. Dorsum of head, body and limbs is generally dull brown. There are five W-shaped dark brown markings on the trunk. An oblique black line runs between eye and nostrils. Two straight dark brown postorbital stripes run through eye to postero-ventrally. Tail is dorsally grey pinkish with 5–7 faded black cross-bands.
