= Lankascincus dorsicatenatus =

Conservation status
- Least Concern (IUCN 3.1)

Scientific classification
- Kingdom: Animalia
- Phylum: Chordata
- Class: Reptilia
- Order: Squamata
- Family: Scincidae
- Genus: Lankascincus
- Species: L. dorsicatenatus

Binomial name
- Lankascincus dorsicatenatus (Deraniyagala, 1953)

Synonyms
- Sphenomorphus dorsicatenatus Deraniyagala, 1953; Lankascincus dorsicatenatus — Greer, 1991

Species of lizard

Lankascincus dorsicatenatus, also known as the catenated lankaskink, is a species of skink, a lizard in the family Scincidae. The species is endemic to island of Sri Lanka.

== Taxonomy ==
L. dorsicatenus was originally placed in the "wastebasket taxon" Sphenomorphus, but was later moved to the genus Lankascincus, which is a genus of skinks endemic to Sri Lanka.

== Geographic range ==
L. dorsicatenatus is found in southwestern Sri Lanka, the wet zone.

== Habitat ==
The preferred natural habitat of L. dorsicatenatus is forest.

== Reproduction ==
L. dorsicatenatus is oviparous. Clutch size is one egg.
