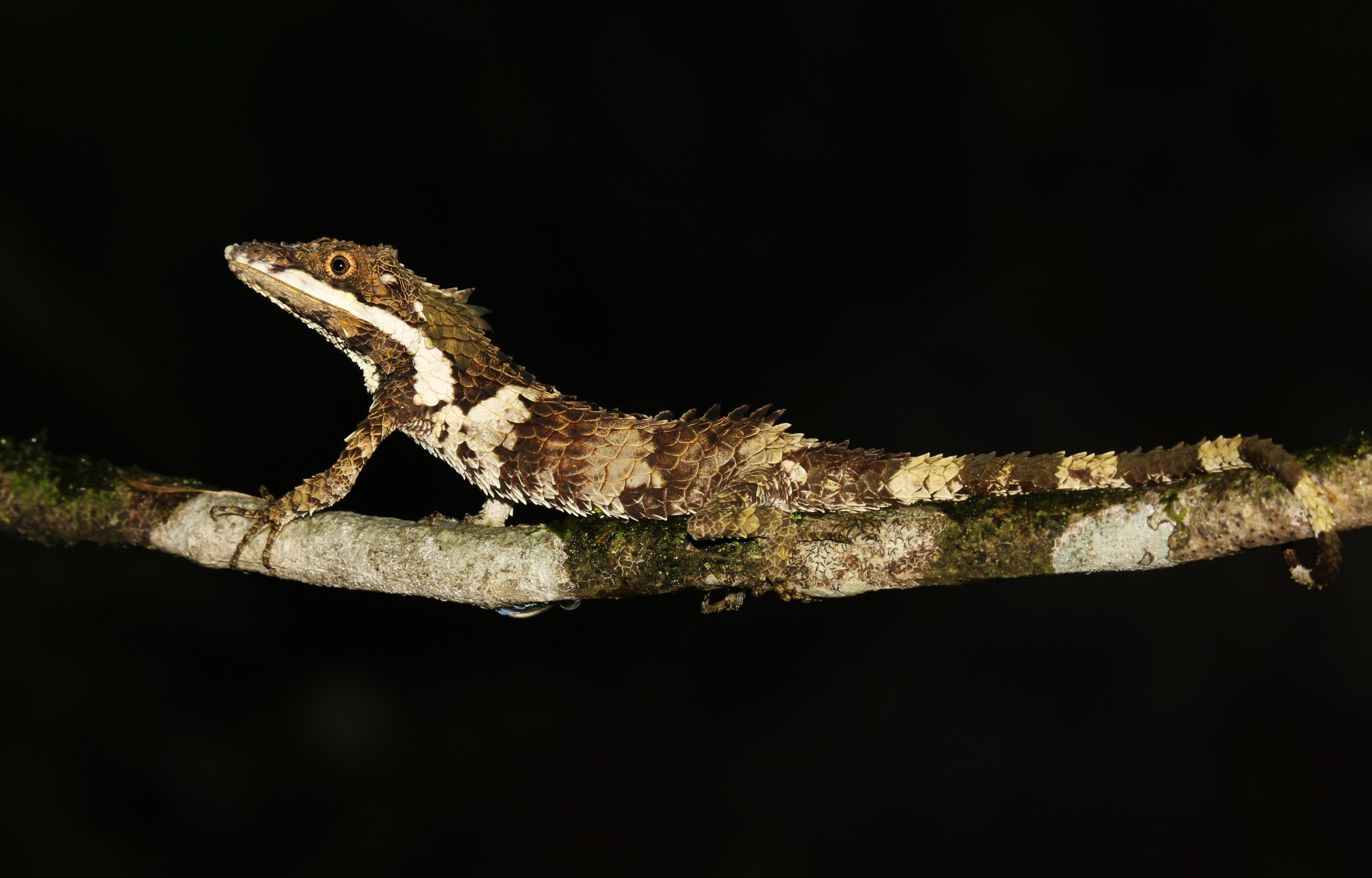

Conservation status
- CITES Appendix I

Scientific classification
- Kingdom: Animalia
- Phylum: Chordata
- Class: Reptilia
- Order: Squamata
- Suborder: Iguania
- Family: Agamidae
- Genus: Cophotis
- Species: C. ceylanica

Binomial name
- Cophotis ceylanica Peters, 1861

= Cophotis ceylanica =

Pygmy Lizard

Species of lizard

Cophotis ceylanica, the Ceylon deaf agama, is an agamid species endemic to Sri Lanka.

== Description ==
Body is compressed. Head is narrow. Long dorso-nuchal crest developed. Temporal scales with three to five large conical scales. Tympanum absent. Tail is short and prehensile. Dorsal scales enlarged. Gualr sacs laterally compressed. Some individuals show orange patches. Pre-anal and femoral pores absent. Dorsum is olive green with darker markings, forming three bands on body and more on tail. A light spot on nape. A broad stripe along anterior of body and one in front of the eyes. Limbs are dark-banded.

== Distribution and habitat ==
A slow-moving lizard, found on moss-covered tree trunks in montane regions of Sri Lanka. Localities include Nuwara Eliya, Horton Plains, Hakgala, Adam's Peak and Knuckles Mountain Range.

== Ecology and reproduction ==
Inhibits within forest mosaic comprising Cyperus and hedges. Social interactions known to include head-bobbing, in response to threat as well as aggressive between males. Four to five live young are produced at a time, measuring 47–50 mm, between May and August.
