= Cnemaspis upendrai =

Scientific classification
- Kingdom: Animalia
- Phylum: Chordata
- Class: Reptilia
- Order: Squamata
- Suborder: Gekkota
- Family: Gekkonidae
- Genus: Cnemaspis
- Species: C. upendrai

Binomial name
- Cnemaspis upendrai Manamendra-Arachchi, Batuwita & Pethiyagoda, 2007

Species of lizard

Cnemaspis upendrai is a species of diurnal gecko endemic to island of Sri Lanka. The specific name honours Siran Upendra Deraniyagala, a Sri Lankan prehistorian.

The species grows to 35 mm (1.4 in) in snout–vent length. Dorsum is light-brown with prominent markings, but some individuals are uniformly yellowish brown, without prominent dorsal markings.
