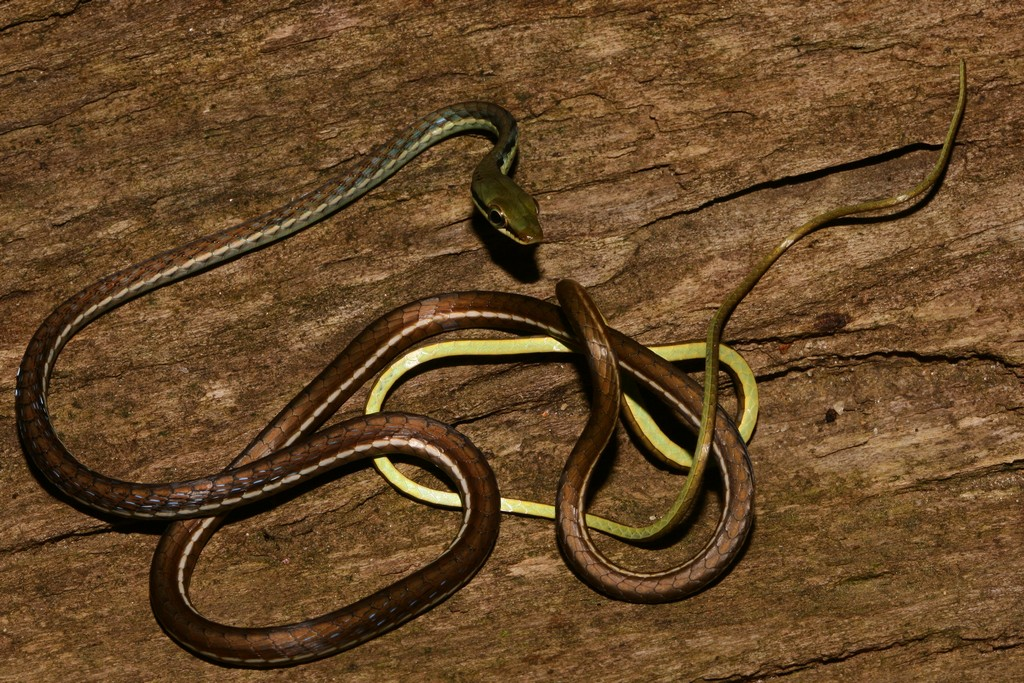

Conservation status
- Least Concern (IUCN 3.1)

Scientific classification
- Kingdom: Animalia
- Phylum: Chordata
- Class: Reptilia
- Order: Squamata
- Suborder: Serpentes
- Family: Colubridae
- Subfamily: Ahaetuliinae
- Genus: Dendrelaphis
- Species: D. bifrenalis

Binomial name
- Dendrelaphis bifrenalis (Boulenger, 1890)

Synonyms
- Ahaetulla bifrenalis Dendrophis bifrenalis

= Dendrelaphis bifrenalis =

Boulenger's bronzeback

Species of snake

Dendrelaphis bifrenalis, also called Boulenger's bronzeback, Boulenger's bronze-back, and Travancore bronze-brown snake, is a colubrid snake native to Eastern Ghats of Southern India and Sri Lanka. It was first described by George Albert Boulenger in 1890. Dendrelaphis wickrorum from Sri Lanka was previously confused with this species.

== Habitat and ecology ==
This oviparous, diurnal and arboreal species can be found in trees, shrubs and bushes in wet and intermediate zones of lowlands to mid hills. However, there are references of finding it from Mullaitivu, Vavuniya and Trincomalee of northern dry zone of Sri Lanka. It is often encountered on low vegetation, however, and it may also descend to the ground in search of food. Arboreal and feeds on frogs, geckos, skinks and agamid lizards. Sometimes descends to the ground, and it is said that when moving on the ground it has a peculiar habit of keeping its head and 1/8 of the forebody erect. These are very active and do not get panicked easily. Dendrelaphis is one of the quickest snakes to escape and hide, when exited they expose the skin underneath scales. Ventral keels help them to climb trees.

== Description ==
Cylindrical, narrow, slender body is present with a dorso-ventrally flattened pear-shaped head. The neck region is clear. Long and compressed snout is present. The tip of it is broad and rounded. The nostrils are present laterally and they are rounded. Round pupil is present in large eyes. Prehensile tail is 1/3 of the body of the snake. Dorsal body of the snake is copper color. Top of the labials and chin is cream or light green color. The tongue is red in color. There is a black broad bar at the sides of the head and run along the eye to the neck region. Lateral corner of the anterior body has black cross strips in a diagonal angle. Two yellow lines run on the lateral sides of the body. Sometimes these lines may be margined by black dots. Ventral body is yellowish green. These are oviparous snakes. They lay eggs in tree hollows. Five long eggs are laid by them at a time. Adult snakes grow about 700–900 mm. Mid-body consists of 15 rows of scales. Vertebrals are clear and enlarged. Dendrelaphis bifrenalis differ in having a red color tongue from other Dendrelaphis species.
