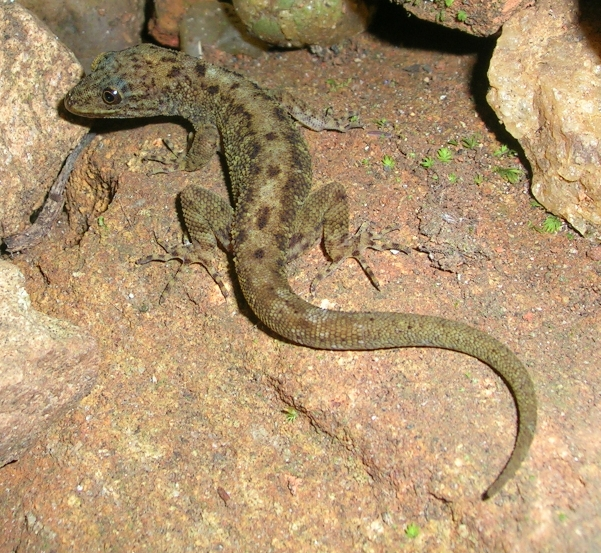

Scientific classification
- Kingdom: Animalia
- Phylum: Chordata
- Class: Reptilia
- Order: Squamata
- Suborder: Gekkota
- Family: Gekkonidae
- Genus: Cnemaspis
- Species: C. amith

Binomial name
- Cnemaspis amith Manamendra-Arachchi, Batuwita & Pethiyagoda, 2007

= Cnemaspis amith =

Species of lizard

Cnemaspis amith, also known as the Amith's daygecko, is a species of diurnal gecko. It is endemic to island of Sri Lanka.
