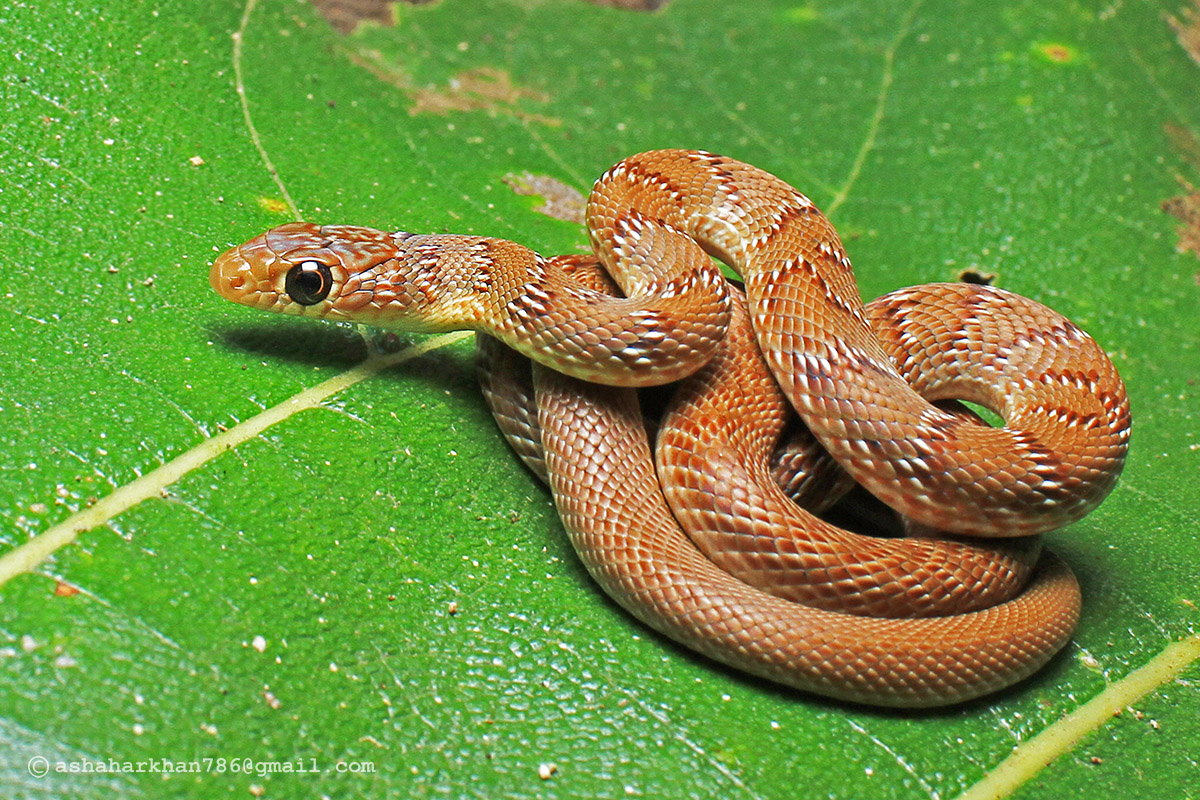
- Wild specimen from Maharashtra, India

Conservation status
- Least Concern (IUCN 3.1)

Scientific classification
- Kingdom: Animalia
- Phylum: Chordata
- Class: Reptilia
- Order: Squamata
- Suborder: Serpentes
- Family: Colubridae
- Genus: Lycodon
- Species: L. fasciolatus

Binomial name
- Lycodon fasciolatus (Shaw, 1802)

Synonyms
- Coluber fasciolatus Shaw, 1802; Coryphodon fasciolatus (Shaw, 1802); Tyria fasciolata (Shaw, 1802); Zamenis fasciolatus (Shaw, 1802); Coluber hebe Daudin, 1803; Lycodon hebe (Daudin, 1803); Natrix hebe (Daudin, 1803); Coluber curvirostris Cantor, 1839; Lycodon anamallensis Günther, 1864; Ophites anamallensis (Günther, 1864); Lycodon osmanhilli Taylor, 1950

= Banded wolf snake =

Species of snake

The banded wolf snake (Lycodon fasciolatus) is a species of snake in the subfamily Colubrinae of the family Colubridae. The species is native to southern Asia. Sometimes called the banded racer, that common name is also used for snakes in the genus Platyceps.

== Geographic distribution ==
Lycodon fasciolatus is found in India (except for North Bengal, Tamil Nadu and Kashmir), Sri Lanka, Pakistan, Nepal, and Bangladesh.

== Description ==
Lycodon fasciolatus has the following characteristics. The snout is obtuse, curved, and prominent. The rostral is large, broader than wide, the portion visible from above more than half its length from the frontal. The suture between the internasals is as long as that between the prefrontals or a little shorter. The frontal is nearly as long as its distance from the end of the snout, or as the parietals. The loreal is as long as deep or longer than deep. There is one preocular, usually with a small subocular below, and two or three postoculars. The temporals are arranged 2+2 or 2+3. The upper labials number eight, the fourth and fifth entering the eye. There are four or five lower labials in contact with the anterior chin shields. The posterior chin shields are nearly as long as the anterior, separated from each other by two or three series of scales. The dorsal scales are smooth, in 21 or 23 rows at midbody. The ventrals number 197–225. The anal scale is divided. The subcaudals number 73–88.

The body is yellowish or brownish olive above, with narrow white, brown, and black variegated cross bands on the anterior half of the body. These bands may entirely disappear in the adult. The lower parts are uniform yellowish.

It may attain a total length of 106 cm (3.5 feet), which includes a tail 22 cm (8.5 inches) long.

Shaw's original description of the species was based on a plate in Russell's An Account of Indian Serpents (1796).
