= Cnemaspis gemunu =

Scientific classification
- Kingdom: Animalia
- Phylum: Chordata
- Class: Reptilia
- Order: Squamata
- Suborder: Gekkota
- Family: Gekkonidae
- Genus: Cnemaspis
- Species: C. gemunu

Binomial name
- Cnemaspis gemunu De Silva, Greenbaum & Jackman, 2007

Species of lizard

Cnemaspis gemunu is a species of diurnal gecko endemic to island of Sri Lanka.
