= Cnemaspis podihuna =

Conservation status
- Vulnerable (IUCN 3.1)

Scientific classification
- Kingdom: Animalia
- Phylum: Chordata
- Class: Reptilia
- Order: Squamata
- Suborder: Gekkota
- Family: Gekkonidae
- Genus: Cnemaspis
- Species: C. podihuna

Binomial name
- Cnemaspis podihuna Deraniyagala, 1944
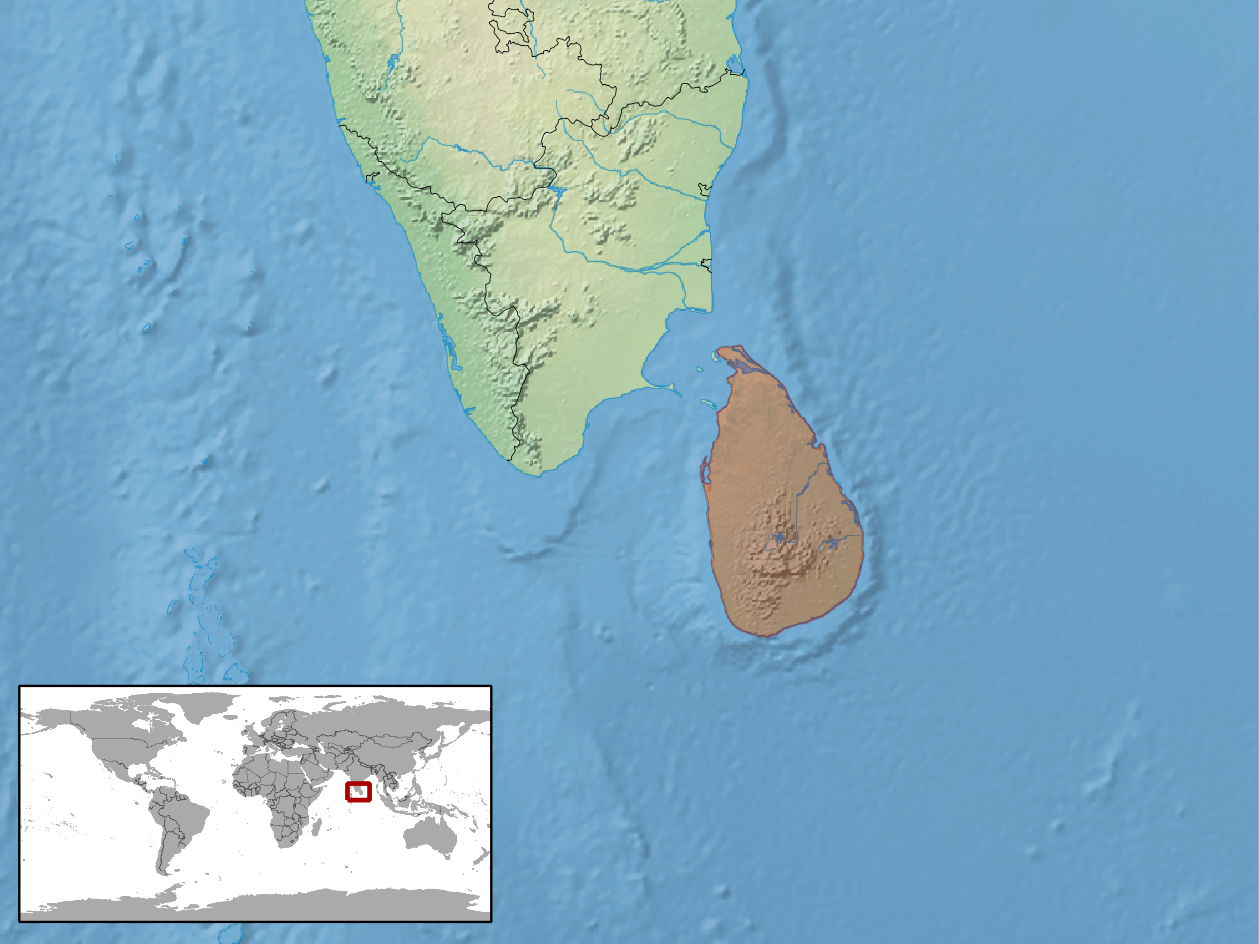

Species of lizard

Cnemaspis podihuna, also known as Deraniyagala's day gecko or dwarf day gecko, is a species of diurnal gecko found only in Sri Lanka.

== Habitat and distribution ==
A small species of day gecko from arid regions of the east. Known from Lahugala Kitulana National Park in the Eastern Province. Recent records found the species from Koslanda, Badulla, Pallegama, Mathugama, Buttala, Central, Uva and Western Provinces.

== Description ==
Snout short. Dorsal scales with smooth granules. Median sub-caudals are enlarged. Ventrals smooth. Glandular scales separate 4-5 pre-anal pores and 3-6 femoral pores on each side. Dorsum brown with four dark transverse markings.

== Ecology & Diet ==
Found in boles and buttresses of trees.

== Reproduction ==
Reproduction occurs year around, and generally 2 small eggs are laid at a time under loose tree barks, measuring 5.6 * 4.2mm. Nesting is not a communal.
