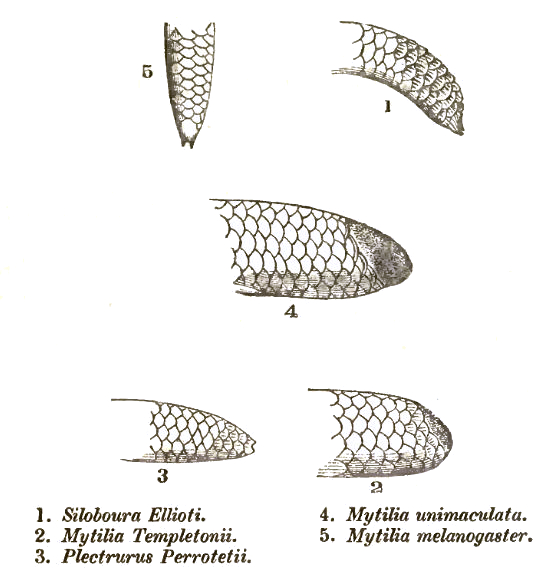

Conservation status
- Endangered (IUCN 3.1)

Scientific classification
- Kingdom: Animalia
- Phylum: Chordata
- Class: Reptilia
- Order: Squamata
- Suborder: Serpentes
- Family: Uropeltidae
- Genus: Rhinophis
- Species: R. blythii

Binomial name
- Rhinophis blythii Kelaart, 1853

= Rhinophis blythii =

Species of snake

Rhinophis blythii, or Blyth's earth snake, is a species of snake in the family Uropeltidae. The species is endemic to the rain forests and grasslands of Sri Lanka.

== Etymology ==
The specific name, blythii, is in honor of English zoologist Edward Blyth (1810-1873), curator of the museum of the Asiatic Society of Bengal.

== Description ==
R. blythii is dark brown, both dorsally and ventrally. The sides have vertical yellow spots or a wavy or zigzag stripe on the anterior half of the body. There is a yellow ring around the base of the tail.

Adults may attain a total length (including tail) of 37 cm (14 1/2 in).

The dorsal scales are in 17 rows at midbody (in 19 rows behind the head). The ventrals number 148-162, and the subcaudals number 4-7.

The snout is acutely pointed. The eye is in the ocular shield. There are no supraoculars, and no temporals. The frontal is longer than broad. There is no mental groove. The diameter of the body goes 22 to 32 times in the total length. The ventrals are only slightly larger than the contiguous scales. The tail ends in a large convex rugose shield, which is neither truncated nor spinose at the end. The caudal disc is 1/2 to 3/5 the length of the shielded part of the head. Some of the distal dorsal scales of the tail are weakly keeled.
