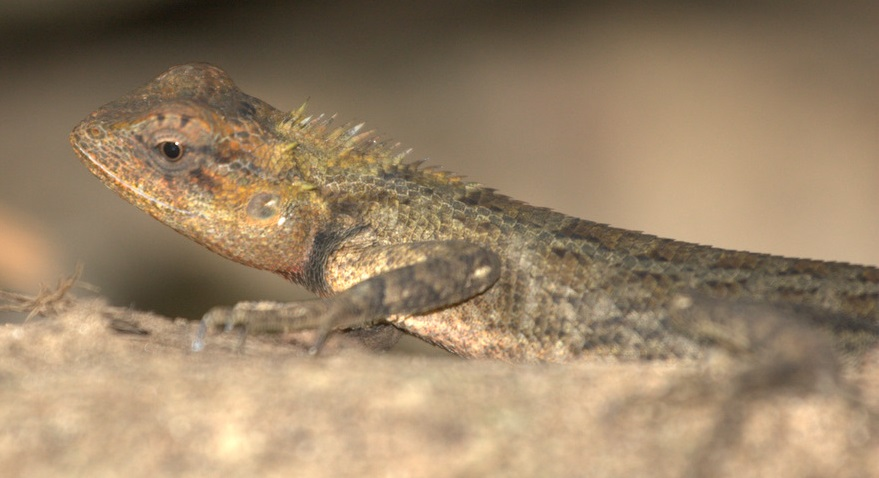

Conservation status
- Least Concern (IUCN 3.1)

Scientific classification
- Kingdom: Animalia
- Phylum: Chordata
- Class: Reptilia
- Order: Squamata
- Suborder: Iguania
- Family: Agamidae
- Genus: Calotes
- Species: C. liolepis

Binomial name
- Calotes liolepis Boulenger, 1885

= Calotes liolepis =

Whistling Lizard

Species of lizard

The whistling lizard or Sri Lanka agama (Calotes liolepis) is a species of lizard in the family Agamidae. It is one of seven Calotes species endemic to Sri Lanka.

== Distribution ==
Restricted to submontane forests below 100 m (330 ft), and found in forested areas and plantations. Widely distributed but frequently found in the central hills of Sri Lanka, including Knuckles, Kotmale, Sinharaja, Talawakele, Hanguranketha, Kanneliya, Galle, Kandy, Dambulla, Peradeniya, Namunukula, and Gampola.

== Description ==
Whistling lizards are able to camouflage, changing color from green to brown to match their environment. The species has a relatively long head and tail, the latter often double the length of its body. A series of spines on the nape make up the dorso-nuchal crest in males, while both males and females possess scales on the dorsum of the body. Ventral scales as large as those on its flanks. The forehead is pale brown, with pale inter-orbital bands, and the dorsum is pale gray with dark gray bands. The limbs and tail are similarly dark-banded.

== Ecology ==
Unusual among agamid lizards is its habit of uttering a high-pitched whistle when alarmed. It feeds on insects and ants. Gravid females are seen between July–August.
