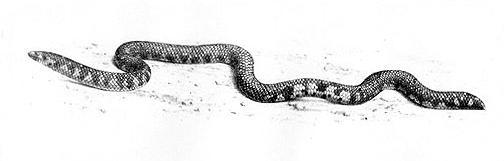

Scientific classification
- Kingdom: Animalia
- Phylum: Chordata
- Class: Reptilia
- Order: Squamata
- Suborder: Serpentes
- Family: Uropeltidae
- Genus: Uropeltis
- Species: U. melanogaster

Binomial name
- Uropeltis melanogaster (Gray, 1858)

Synonyms
- Mytilia (Crealia) melanogaster Gray, 1858; Plectrurus ceylonicus Peters, 1859; Rhinophis melanogaster; Jan, 1865; Silybura melanogaster; Beddome, 1886; Uropeltis melanogaster; M.A. Smith, 1943

= Uropeltis melanogaster =

Species of snake

Uropeltis melanogaster, or Gray's earth snake, is a species of small snake in the family Uropeltidae (shieldtail snakes), endemic to Sri Lanka.

== Geographic range ==
It is found only in Sri Lanka (formerly called Ceylon).

== Description ==
Dark brown dorsally and ventrally, with yellow spots more or less confluent into a lateral stripe. Some young are yellow, with a dark brown spot on each scale of the dorsum, chin, and tail.

Its total length is from 10 to 27 cm (3.9 to 10.6 in).

Dorsal scales arranged in 17 rows at midbody, in 19 rows behind the head. Ventrals 141–166; subcaudals 6–10.

Snout pointed. Rostral about one-third the length of the shielded part of the head. Portion of rostral visible from above longer than its distance from the frontal. Nasals completely separated from each other by the rostral. Frontal longer than broad. Eye small, its diameter less than half the length of the ocular shield. Diameter of body 22 to 31 times in the total length. Ventrals only slightly larger than the contiguous scales. Tail round or slightly laterally compressed, dorsal scales of tail with very faint keels. Terminal scute with two small spines.

== Taxonomy ==
This species and its relatives are generally called "earth snakes." Many have been classified previously in different genera, in this case Mytilia (Crealia), Plectrurus, Rhinophis, and Silybura.

== See also ==
- Genus Uropeltis.
