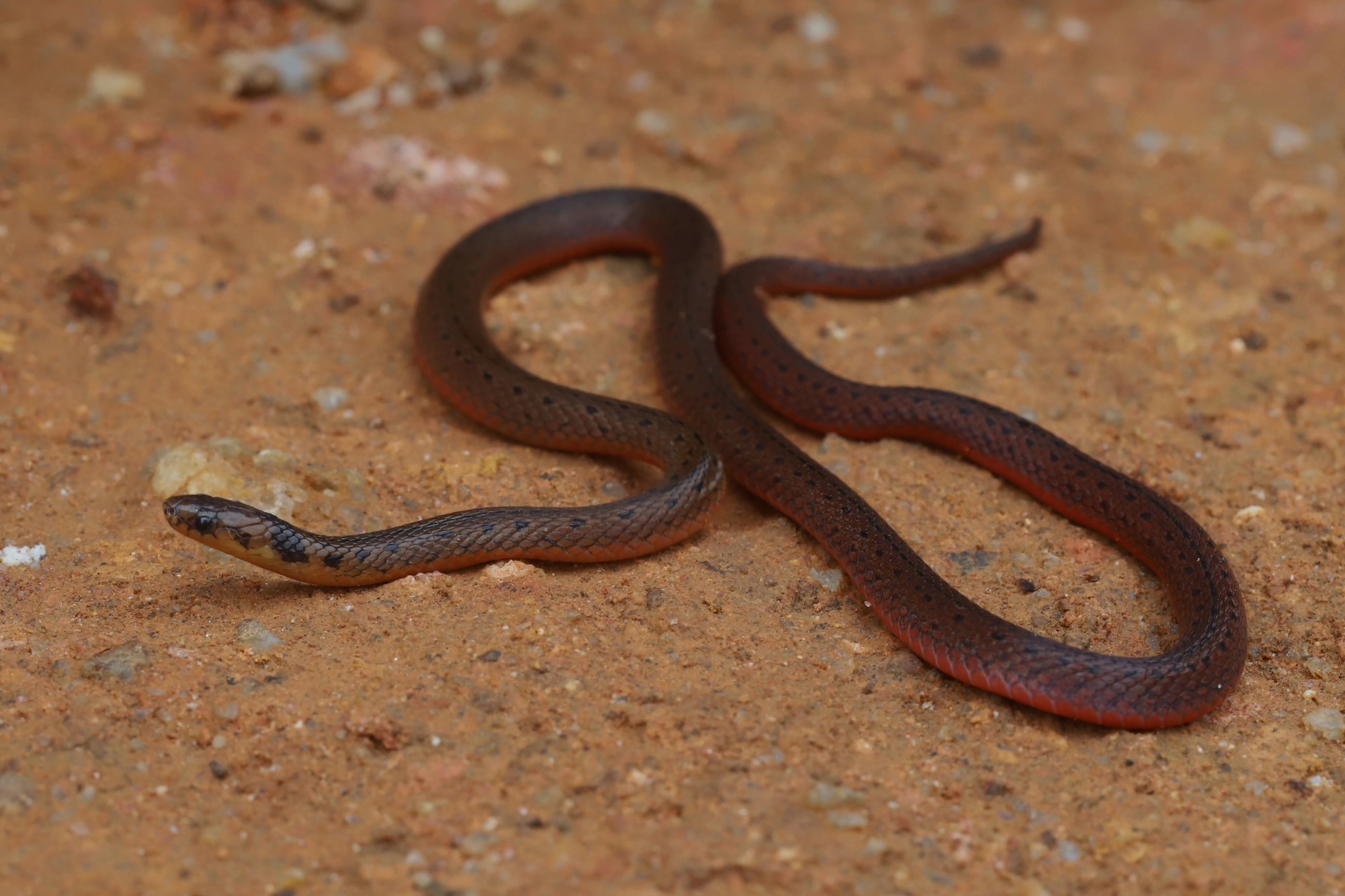

Conservation status
- Vulnerable (IUCN 3.1)

Scientific classification
- Kingdom: Animalia
- Phylum: Chordata
- Class: Reptilia
- Order: Squamata
- Suborder: Serpentes
- Family: Colubridae
- Genus: Aspidura
- Species: A. ceylonensis

Binomial name
- Aspidura ceylonensis (Günther, 1858)

Synonyms
- List: Haplocercus ceylonensis Günther, 1858; Aspidura carinata – Jan, 1862 (fide Smith, 1943); Haplocercus ceylonensis — Boulenger, 1893; Wall, 1908, 1921, Smith 1943; Haplocercus ceylonensis — Das, 1996; Aspidura ceylonensis — Pyron et al. 2013; Wallach et al. 2014

= Aspidura ceylonensis =

Species of snake

Aspidura ceylonensis, also known as the Ceylon keelback, black-spined snake, or slender mould snake, is a species of colubrid snake endemic to Sri Lanka.

== Distribution ==
Aspidura ceylonensis is a semi-fossorial snake from submontane forests. Restricted to submontane forests and plantations of the Central Highlands, including Pussellawa, Gampola, Hatton, Knuckles, Balangoda, Pundaluoya, Ramboda, Kotagala, Namunukula, Mousakanda, Gammaduwa, and Kotmale, up to about 1,200 m (3,900 ft) of elevation.

== Description ==
The head is long and the snout is broadly rounded. The neck is indistinct and the body is slender with cylindrical, short tail. The dorsal side is crimson brown with a black vertebral line, hence given the name. The dorsum of fore-body is brown. Laterally there are a series of black spots in a line and the neck region has a dark brown marking. The venter is crimson colored. Adults are 50 cm (20 in) in length.

The midbody has 17 scale rows. There are 162–207 ventral scales and 37–56 subcaudal scales. The scales are smooth and iridescent.

== Ecology ==
It is a nocturnal and terrestrial snake that lives in damp soil, silted-up drains, beneath heaps of decaying leaves, and in similar places where there are earthworms, its primary prey.

=== Reproduction ===
Clutches of two to five eggs are produced in the months of August to November.
