= Cnemaspis scalpensis =

Conservation status
- Critically Endangered (IUCN 3.1)

Scientific classification
- Kingdom: Animalia
- Phylum: Chordata
- Class: Reptilia
- Order: Squamata
- Suborder: Gekkota
- Family: Gekkonidae
- Genus: Cnemaspis
- Species: C. scalpensis

Binomial name
- Cnemaspis scalpensis (Ferguson, 1877)

Synonyms
- Gymnodactylus scalpensis Ferguson, 1877; Cnemaspis jerdoni scalpensis — Deraniyagala, 1953; Cnemaspis ranwellai Wickramasinghe, 2006; Cnemaspis scalpensis — Wickramasinghe & Munindradasa, 2007

Species of lizard

Cnemaspis scalpensis, commonly called Ferguson's day gecko or the rocky day gecko, is a species of diurnal gecko in the family Gekkonidae. The species is found only in Sri Lanka.

== Geographic range and habitat ==
C. scalpensis is found in the Kandy valley in Sri Lanka, and more common in the dry zone, than the wet zone. Its preferred natural habitat is forest, but it has also been found in gardens with large trees. Localities include Gannoruwa, Gammaduwa, Palmadulla, Ritigala, and Kandy.

== Description ==
The snout of C. scalpensis is short. The dorsal scales are smooth granules. The median subcaudals are enlarged. The ventrals are smooth. Preanal pores are absent, but femoral pores are present. The dorsum is brown or bluish-gray, with dense brown reticulations. The forehead and lips have light spots. The throat is dusted with brown, with 5-6 irregular cross bars of light spots. The rest of the venter is bright yellow.

== Ecology ==
C. scalpensis is a diurnal and crepuscular species, often found in pairs, predominately on trunks of large trees and rarely on rocks.

== Reproduction ==
C. scalpensis is oviparous. 1-2 eggs with dimensions of 5 mm (0.20 in) are deposited, and hatchlings measure 13 mm (0.51 in).
