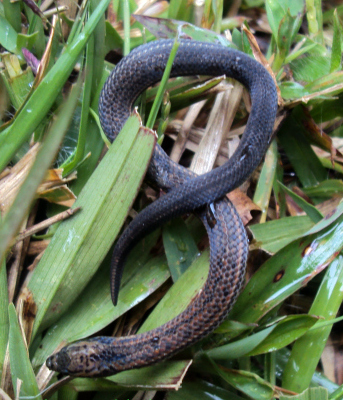
- Aspidura trachyprocta

Scientific classification
- Kingdom: Animalia
- Phylum: Chordata
- Class: Reptilia
- Order: Squamata
- Suborder: Serpentes
- Family: Colubridae
- Subfamily: Natricinae
- Genus: Aspidura; Wagler, 1830

= Aspidura =

Genus of snakes

Aspidura is a genus of snakes in the subfamily Natricinae of the Family Colubridae. The genus is endemic to island of Sri Lanka. Member species are commonly known as rough-sided snakes, except for A. ceylonensis, which is commonly known as the black-spined snake and was formerly in the genus Haplocercus. The genus Aspidura comprises nine species, with the latest having been discovered in 2019.

== Species ==
The following species are recognized as being valid.

- Aspidura brachyorrhos (F. Boie, 1827) – Boie's rough-sided snake
- Aspidura ceylonensis (Günther, 1858) – black-spined snake
- Aspidura copei Günther, 1864 – Cope's rough-sided snake
- Aspidura deraniyagalae Gans & Fetcho, 1982 – Deraniyagala's rough-sided snake
- Aspidura desilvai M. Wickramasinghe, Bandara, Vidanapathirana & N. Wickramasinghe, 2019 – De Silva's rough-sided snake
- Aspidura drummondhayi Boulenger, 1904 – Drummond-Hay's rough-sided snake
- Aspidura guentheri Ferguson, 1876 – Günther's rough-sided snake
- Aspidura ravanai M. Wickramasinghe, Vidanapathirana, Kandambi, Pyron & N. Wickramasinghe, 2017 – Ravana's rough-sided snake
- Aspidura trachyprocta Cope, 1860 – common rough-sided snake
