= Rhinophis mendisi =

Conservation status
- Data Deficient (IUCN 3.1)

Scientific classification
- Kingdom: Animalia
- Phylum: Chordata
- Order: Squamata
- Suborder: Serpentes
- Family: Uropeltidae
- Genus: Rhinophis
- Species: R. mendisi

Binomial name
- Rhinophis mendisi Gower 2020

Synonyms
- Rhinophis homolepis Olori & Bell; Rhinophis trevelyanus Olori & Bell

Species of snake

Rhinophis mendisi, or Mendis’ shieldtail, is a recently described fossorial species of snake in the family Uropeltidae. It is endemic to Sri Lanka and only known from its type locality, near Balangoda, Sabaragamuwa Province.

== Entomology ==
It was first described by British herpetologist Dr. David J. Gower in 2020, and named in honour of Sri Lankan herpetologist and naturalist, L. J. Mendis Wickramasinghe.

== Description ==
R. mendisi superficially resembles Rhinophis homolepis in colour pattern and in its prominent, conical tail shield, but differs from that species in having far fewer ventrals. It has 17 dorsal scale rows at midbody, with more than 155 and fewer than 180 ventral scales.

== Habitat ==
The type locality is the wet zone of the southern hills of Sri Lanka at an elevation of 550–700 m (1,800–2,300 ft) above sea level. All known specimens are believed to have been collected from soils in agricultural habitats.
