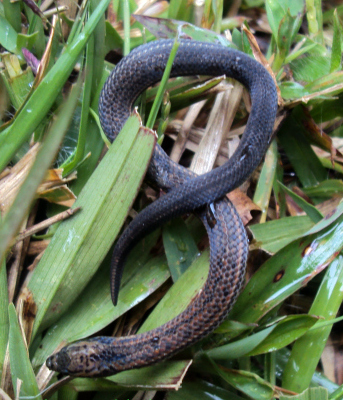

Conservation status
- Endangered (IUCN 3.1)

Scientific classification
- Kingdom: Animalia
- Phylum: Chordata
- Class: Reptilia
- Order: Squamata
- Suborder: Serpentes
- Family: Colubridae
- Genus: Aspidura
- Species: A. trachyprocta

Binomial name
- Aspidura trachyprocta Cope,1860

= Aspidura trachyprocta =

Common rough-sided snake

Species of snake

Aspidura trachyprocta, the common rough-sided snake, is a colubrid species endemic to Sri Lanka.

== Distribution ==
A commonly encountered small burrowing snake from midhills to montane limits of central Sri Lanka. Localities recorded are Gammaduwa, Monaragala, Labukele, Nuwara Eliya, Harasbedda, Eskdale, Central Kandy, Pundaluoya, Longton Estate, Diyagama Estate, Nanu Oya, Sita Eliya, Ambewela, Pattipola, Hakgala, Horton Plains National Park, Namunukula, Kandy, Radella, Ramboda, and Diyatalawa at elevations of 750-2100m.

== Description ==
Head indistinct from neck, body is cylindrical. Dorsum range from blackish brown to light reddish brown, with lateral stripes and 2–3 rows of dark dorsal spots. Venter varying from being heavily blotched with black to light yellow with a red tint and just blotched on midline.

== Scalation ==
Midbody scale rows 15. Pre-oculars present. 2 Post-oculars contact with parietal. Ventrals 128–151. Subcaudals 11–26.

== Ecology ==
Found in piles of humus, leaf litter and rotten timber, within agricultural lands.

== Reproduction ==
4–12 eggs at a time, measuring 16 × 25mm.
