= Aspidura brachyorrhos =

Boie's rough-sided snake

Conservation status
- Vulnerable (IUCN 3.1)

Scientific classification
- Kingdom: Animalia
- Phylum: Chordata
- Class: Reptilia
- Order: Squamata
- Suborder: Serpentes
- Family: Colubridae
- Genus: Aspidura
- Species: A. brachyorrhos

Binomial name
- Aspidura brachyorrhos Boie.,1827

Species of snake

Aspidura brachyorrhos, commonly known as Boie's rough-sided snake and as ලේ මැඩිල්ලා (le medilla) in Sinhala, is a species of colubrid endemic to Sri Lanka. Bites from this species are known to cause mild local reactions, including a slight burning sensation and swelling.

== Distribution ==
A small burrowing snake found in the midhills of central Sri Lanka. Recorded localities include Namunukula, Gampola, Weligala, Peradeniya, Gammaduwa, Dambulla, Kegalle, and Kandy.

== Description ==
The head is indistinct from the neck, and the body is cylindrical. The dorsal side is a rich orange-brown with mottled, discontinuous mid-dorsal stripes that are distinct, accompanied by two rows of lateral spots. The head is dark brown.

== Scalation ==
Midbody scale rows: 17. Pre-ocular scales present. Two post-oculars in contact with the parietal. Ventrals: 134–159. Subcaudals: 25–39.

== Ecology ==
Little is known about this species. It occurs at elevations between 610 and 1,100 meters. This species has been found in tea plantations, vegetable gardens, and has also been unearthed from riverbanks.

== Reproduction ==
Between 2 and 6 offsprings measuring 8 × 28 mm are produced.
