= Nessia bipes =

Smith's Snake Skink

Scientific classification
- Domain: Eukaryota
- Kingdom: Animalia
- Phylum: Chordata
- Class: Reptilia
- Order: Squamata
- Family: Scincidae
- Genus: Nessia
- Species: N. bipes

Binomial name
- Nessia bipes (Smith, 1935)

Species of reptile

Smith's snake skink (Nessia bipes), also known as the two-legged nessia, is a species of skink endemic to island of Sri Lanka.

== Habitat & distribution ==
A burrowing skink from eastern Knuckles Mountain Range. Known localities are few and include Gammaduwa and Matalapitiya.

== Description ==
Midbody scales rows 28. Body slender and equal girth from head to tail. Snout broad and obtuse. Fore limbs absent. Hind limbs vestigial and appear as buds. Dorsum brown or light reddish brown, hatchlings are dark gray or black.

== Ecology & diet ==
Hides under rubble, decaying logs and in leaf liter in submontane forests, at elevations of up to 750m. When exposed, they immediately wriggle into loose soil or under rubble. Feeds on insects.

== Reproduction ==
Lay 2-4 eggs in loose soil in March, April, or May.
