= Nessia layardi =

Conservation status
- Critically Endangered (IUCN 3.1)

Scientific classification
- Kingdom: Animalia
- Phylum: Chordata
- Class: Reptilia
- Order: Squamata
- Family: Scincidae
- Genus: Nessia
- Species: N. layardi

Binomial name
- Nessia layardi (Kelaart, 1853)

Synonyms
- Acontias layardi Kelaart, 1853; Acontias (Nessia) layardi — Deraniyagala, 1931; Acontias (Anguinicephalus) layardi — Deraniyagala, 1934; Nessia layardi — M.A. Smith, 1935

Species of lizard

Nessia layardi, commonly known as Layard's snake skink or Layard's nessia, is a species of lizard in the subfamily Scincinae of the family Scincidae. The species is endemic to the island of Sri Lanka.

== Etymology ==
The specific name, layardi, is in honor of British naturalist Edgar Leopold Layard.

== Habitat and geographic range ==
The preferred natural habitat of N. layardi is forest. A poorly known skink from the hills of the Central Province and the wet zone coastal areas, known localities include Millawa, Wellawatte, Lunava, and Polgahawela. It inhabits moist soil and decaying leaf litter, especially at the base of trees, at elevations up to 150 m (490 ft).

== Description ==
N. layardi is legless. The snout of is subconical. A single loreal is present. The limbs, an ear opening, and supranasals are absent. The dorsum is brown, each scale with a darker margin.

== Reproduction ==
N. layardi is oviparous. Clutch size is two eggs. The eggs, which are produced around March, are deposited in heaps of coconut leaves or in silt over stony substratum. The eggs are soft-shelled, measuring 6.4 mm × 15.9 mm (0.25 in × 0.63 in).
