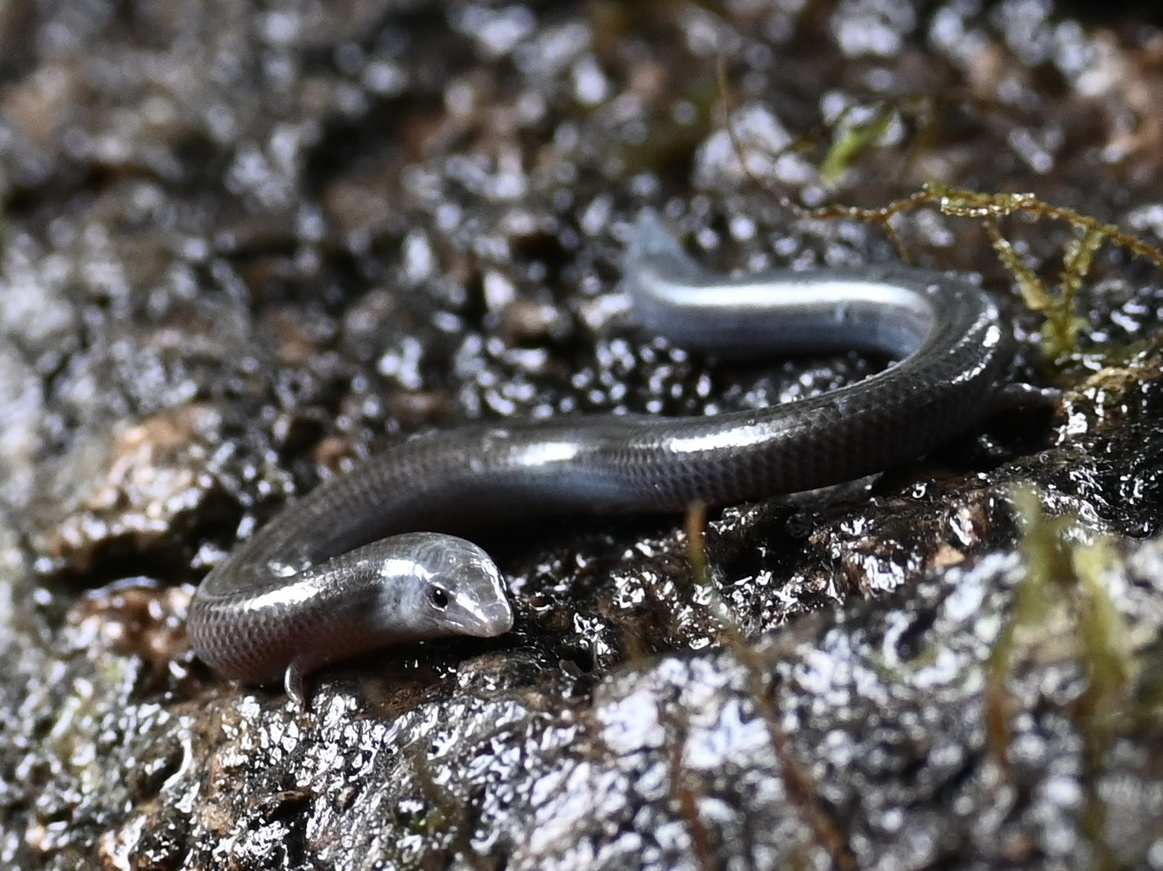
- N. gansi

Scientific classification
- Kingdom: Animalia
- Phylum: Chordata
- Class: Reptilia
- Order: Squamata
- Family: Scincidae
- Subfamily: Scincinae
- Genus: Nessia; Gray, 1839

= Nessia =

Genus of lizards

Nessia is a genus of skinks, lizards in the family Scincidae. The genus is endemic to Sri Lanka. Species in the genus Nessia are commonly known as snake skinks.

== Species ==
The following nine species are recognized as being valid:

- Nessia bipes M.A. Smith, 1935 – two-legged nessia
- Nessia burtonii Gray, 1839 – Burton's nessia
- Nessia deraniyagalai Taylor, 1950 – Deraniyagala's nessia
- Nessia didactyla (Deraniyagala, 1934) – two-toed nessia
- Nessia gansi Batuwita & Edirisinghe, 2017
- Nessia hickanala Deraniyagala, 1940 – Hickanala nessia
- Nessia layardi (Kelaart, 1853) – Layard's nessia
- Nessia monodactyla (Gray, 1839) – one-toed nessia
- Nessia sarasinorum (F. Müller, 1889) – Müller's nessia

Nota bene: A binomial authority in parentheses indicates that the species was originally described in a genus other than Nessia.
