= Rhinophis roshanpererai =

Conservation status
- Critically Endangered (IUCN 3.1)

Scientific classification
- Kingdom: Animalia
- Phylum: Chordata
- Class: Reptilia
- Order: Squamata
- Suborder: Serpentes
- Family: Uropeltidae
- Genus: Rhinophis
- Species: R. roshanpererai

Binomial name
- Rhinophis roshanpererai Wickramasinghe, Vidanapathirana, Rajeev & Gower, 2017

Species of snake

Rhinophis roshanpererai, the Roshan Perera's shieldtail or Roshan Perera's rhinophis, is a species of snake in the family Uropeltidae. It is endemic to Sri Lanka. The species was first described from three specimens taken from Badulla District. The species lack pale stripes and possess three to four prominent spines with a small shield-tail.

== Etymology ==
The specific name roshanpererai was named in honor of deceased Roshan Perera, who was a reptile instructor at Young Zoologist's Association of Sri Lanka, Department of National Zoological Gardens.
