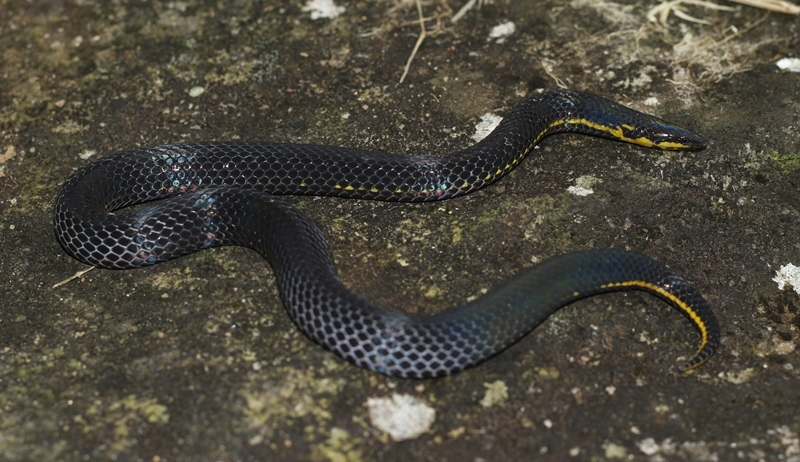

Conservation status
- Critically Endangered (IUCN 3.1)

Scientific classification
- Kingdom: Animalia
- Phylum: Chordata
- Class: Reptilia
- Order: Squamata
- Suborder: Serpentes
- Family: Colubridae
- Genus: Aspidura
- Species: A. ravanai

Binomial name
- Aspidura ravanai Wickramasinghe, Vidanapathirana, Kandambi, Pyron & Wickramasinghe, 2017

= Aspidura ravanai =

Species of snake

Aspidura ravanai, commonly known as Ravana's rough-sided snake is a species of colubrid snake endemic to Sri Lanka.

== Taxonomy ==
The specific name, ravanai, is in honor of the Sri Lankan mythological King Ravana.

== Distribution and habitat ==
A. ravanai is known only from the western slopes Sri Pada sanctuary in the central highlands of Sri Lanka.

== Description ==
A. ravanai is a small snake similar to its sister lineage A. trachyprocta. The dorsum is dark black in color. A yellowish line runs through the body in venter region.
