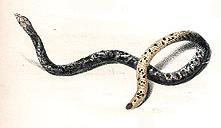
- Salty earth snake, R. sanguineus

Scientific classification
- Kingdom: Animalia
- Phylum: Chordata
- Class: Reptilia
- Order: Squamata
- Suborder: Serpentes
- Family: Uropeltidae
- Genus: Rhinophis; Hemprich, 1820

Synonyms
- Rhinophis Hemprich, 1820; Crealia Gray, 1858; Dapatnaya Kelaart, 1853; Mitylia Gray, 1858; Mytilia Gray, 1858; Morina Gray, 1858

= Rhinophis =

Genus of snakes

Common names: shield-tail snakes, earth snakes

Rhinophis is a genus of nonvenomous shield-tail snakes found in Sri Lanka and South India. Currently, 24 species (with no subspecies) are recognized in this genus. Of the 24 species, 18 are endemic to Sri Lanka, while six are endemic to South India.

== Geographic range ==
Found mainly in Sri Lanka and also in southern India. In Sri Lanka, this genus also occurs in low plains in the dry zone.

== Species ==
Species	Taxon author	Common name	Geographic range
Rhinophis blythii	Kelaart, 1853	Blyth's earth snake	Sri Lanka in the hills of the Central (Hatton and Pundluoya), Uva, Sabaragamuwa (Balangoda) and Southern Province.
Rhinophis dorsimaculatus	Deraniyagala, 1941	polka-dot earth snake	Sri Lanka. Known only from the type locality in the North Western Province.
Rhinophis drummondhayi	Wall, 1921	Drummond-Hay's earth snake	Sri Lanka in the hills of the Central and Uva Provinces (Haldumulla, Nanunukula and Uva Patnas at 1,200 m elevation).
Rhinophis erangaviraji	Wickramasinghe et al., 2009	Eranga Viraj's shield-tail snake	Sri Lanka.
Rhinophis fergusonianus	Boulenger, 1896	Cardamom Hills shield-tail snake	Southern India in the Western Ghats: the Cardamom Hills, Travancore.
Rhinophis goweri	Aengals & Ganesh, 2013	Gower's shield-tail snake	the Eastern Ghats of Tamil Nadu in the Bodha Malai Hills of the Namakkal District
Rhinophis gunasekarai	Wickramasinghe, Vidanapathirana, Wickramasinghe, & Gower, 2020	Gunasekara's shield-tail snake	Sri Lanka (the Central Province)
Rhinophis homolepis	(Hemprich, 1820)	Trevelyan's earth snake	Sri Lanka in the hills of Sabaragamuwa (Ratnapura, Yatiyantota and Balangoda Hills below 900 m), the Central and Uva Provinces
Rhinophis karinthandani	Sampaio et al., 2020		Sri Lanka: Wayanad
Rhinophis lineatus	Gower & Maduwage, 2011	striped earth snake	Sri Lanka
Rhinophis melanogaster	(Gray, 1858)	Gray's earth snake	Sri Lanka
Rhinophis melanoleucus	Cyriac, Narayanan, Sampaio, Umesh, & Gower, 2020		India (Kerala)
Rhinophis mendisi	Gower, 2020	Mendis' shield-tail snake	Sri Lanka
Rhinophis oxyrynchus^{T}	(Schneider, 1801)	Schneider's earth snake	Sri Lanka in the dry zone of the Northern, Central and Eastern Provinces
Rhinophis philippinus	(Cuvier, 1829)	Peters's earth snake	Sri Lanka in the hills of Sabaragamuwa and the Central Provinces
Rhinophis phillipsi	(Nicholls, 1929)	Phillips' earth snake	Sri Lanka
Rhinophis porrectus	Wall, 1921	Willey's earth snake	Sri Lanka, known only from the type locality in the North Western Province
Rhinophis punctatus	J.P. Müller, 1832	Müller's earth snake	Sri Lanka in the Central (Kandy, Peradeniya) and Western Provinces (Puttalam)
Rhinophis roshanpererai	Wickramasinghe et al., 2017	Roshan Perera's shield-tail snake	Sri Lanka from the central hills around Badulla
Rhinophis saffragamus	(Kelaart, 1853)	large shield-tail snake	Sri Lanka
Rhinophis sanguineus	Beddome, 1863	salty earth snake	Southern India in the Western Ghats: Mysore (Koppa, Kalsa), Waynad, the Nilgiris, Travancore and the Tinnevelly Hills
Rhinophis siruvaniensis	Cyriac, Umesh, Achyuthan, Vidisha Kulkarni & Ganesh, 2025		Southern India in the Western Ghats: the Siruvani Hills
Rhinophis travancoricus	Boulenger, 1893	Travancore earth snake	Southern India: Travancore, from sea level to an elevation of about 1,200 m in the hills. In Trivandrum, Peermade, Mahendragiri, Ernakulam and Chenganacherry.
Rhinophis tricoloratus	Deraniyagala, 1975		Sri Lanka. Known only from the type locality: "vicinity of the rain forest of Sinha Raja to the south west of Ratnapura at an elevation of 1,500 feet with a rainfall of over 200 inches per annum".
Rhinophis zigzag	Gower & Maduwage, 2011	zigzag shield-tail snake	Sri Lanka

- ) Not including the nominate subspecies.

^{T}) Type species.
