= Rhinophis punctatus =

Conservation status
- Critically Endangered (IUCN 3.1)

Scientific classification
- Kingdom: Animalia
- Phylum: Chordata
- Class: Reptilia
- Order: Squamata
- Suborder: Serpentes
- Family: Uropeltidae
- Genus: Rhinophis
- Species: R. punctatus

Binomial name
- Rhinophis punctatus J.P. Müller, 1832

Species of snake

Rhinophis punctatus, or Müller's earth snake, is a species of snake in the Uropeltidae family. It is endemic to the island of Sri Lanka.

== Description ==
Yellowish dorsally and ventrally, each scale with a blackspot. However, the scales of the rows adjoining the vertebral row lack spots.

Adults may attain a total length of 39 cm (15 1/4 in).

Scalation very similar to Rhinophis oxyrhynchus. Differs in having a more slender body (diameter 47 to 49 times in total length) and a higher number of ventrals (236-246).
