= Nessia hickanala =

Scientific classification
- Kingdom: Animalia
- Phylum: Chordata
- Class: Reptilia
- Order: Squamata
- Family: Scincidae
- Genus: Nessia
- Species: N. hickanala

Binomial name
- Nessia hickanala Deraniyagala, 1940

Species of lizard

Nessia hickanala, also known as the shark-headed snake skink and Hickanala nessia, is a species of skink endemic to island of Sri Lanka.

== Description ==
Midbody scales rows 2–21. Body is elongated and limbless. Head flattened, wedge-shaped. Eyes greatly reduced. Lower eyelid comprising three transparent scales. Ears are small. Dorsal scales enlarged. Dorsum and venter are pinkish brown. Scales dark brown.

== Distribution and habitat ==
A fossorial skink, known only from the dry North West. One specimen was found from a depth of 6 cm under a heap of coconut branches at Pomparippu, Snout 8 km from the coast. Species is also known from Wilpattu National Park.

== Ecology and diet ==
Inhabits lowlands, under 50m.

== Reproduction ==
2 eggs are laid in loose soil.
