= Aspidura deraniyagalae =

Conservation status
- Critically Endangered (IUCN 3.1)

Scientific classification
- Kingdom: Animalia
- Phylum: Chordata
- Order: Squamata
- Suborder: Serpentes
- Family: Colubridae
- Genus: Aspidura
- Species: A. deraniyagalae

Binomial name
- Aspidura deraniyagalae Gans & Fetcho, 1982

Species of snake

Aspidura deraniyagalae, commonly known as Deraniyagala's rough-sided snake, the Sri Lanka rough-sided snake, and කදු මැඩිල්ලා (kandu medilla) in Sinhala, is a colubrid species endemic to Sri Lanka.

== Etymology ==
The specific name, deraniyagalae, is in honor of Sri Lankan zoologist Paulus Edward Pieris Deraniyagala.

== Geographic range ==
A. deraniyagalae is known from the eastern slopes of the central highlands of Sri Lanka. Localities recorded are Namunukula, Kanawarella, Spring Valley, and Pindarawatta.

== Habitat ==
The preferred natural habitat of A. deraniyagalae is forest, at elevations of around 1,520 m (4,990 ft).

== Description ==
A. deraniyagalae is a small snake. The head is indistinct from the neck, and the body is cylindrical in cross section. The dorsum is light beige to dark brown. The head is dark-pigmented. The venter is blackish-brown, with lighter mottling.

== Scalation ==
A. deraniyagalae has the following scalation. The dorsal scales are arranged in 17 rows at midbody. Preoculars are present, forming a part of the anterior border of the orbit of the eye. The 2 postoculars are in contact with the parietal. Ventrals 117–122. Subcaudals 13–26.

== Reproduction ==
A. deraniyagalae is oviparous. Sexually mature females produce about two to four eggs at a time.
