= Ceylon, Physical, Historical and Topographical =

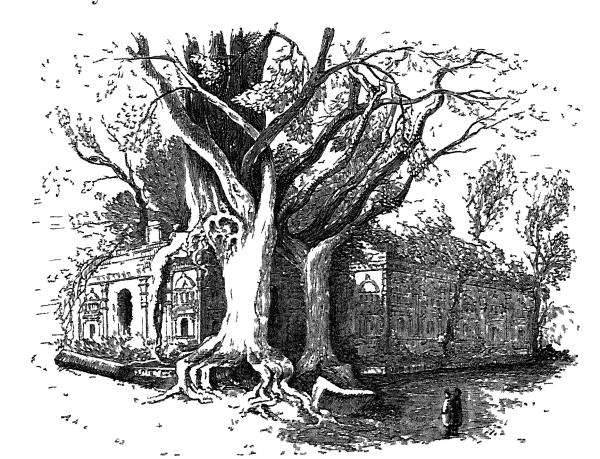
Plate from Ceylon Fig Tree on the Ruins of Polonnarua. Wood engraving by Andrew Nicholl (1804 – 1886). A combination of the exotic, the factual and the myth made Ceylon a very popular book

Ceylon. An Account of the Island, Physical, Historical, and Topographical with Notices of its Natural History, Antiquities and Productions is a two-volume book from 1859 by James Emerson Tennent.

"There is no island in the world, Great Britain itself not excepted, that has attracted the attention of authors in so many distant ages and so many different countries as Ceylon. There is no nation in ancient or modern times possessed of a language and a literature, the writers of which have not at some time made it their theme. Its aspect, its religion, its antiquities, and productions, have been described as well by the classic Greeks, as by those of the Lower Empire; by the Romans; by the writers of China, Burmah, India, and Kashmir; by the geographers of Arabia and Persia; by the medieval voyagers of Italy and France; by the annalists of Portugal and Spain; by the merchant adventurers of Holland, and by the travellers and topographers of Great Britain."- Introduction

First published in 1859, by Spottiswoode & Co. for Longman, Green, Longman, and Roberts of London Ceylon proved very popular and five editions, variously revised were in published in eight months, the last in 1860. The work is an account of many aspects of the island of Ceylon with chapters on the geology, climate, flora and fauna, history, religion and Buddhism, farming, commerce, the arts, science, Portuguese, Dutch and English influence followed by accounts of elephants, the forest, and ruined cities.

"Ceylon" is an encyclopaedic work collating the research of many people. In the Introduction to "Ceylon" Tennent writes "Respecting the Physical Geography and Natural History of the colony, I found an equal want of reliable information; and every work that even touched on the subject was pervaded by the misapprehension which I have collected evidence to correct; that Ceylon is but a fragment of the great Indian continent dissevered by some local convulsion; and that the zoology and botany of the island are identical with those of the mainland. Thus for almost every particular and fact, whether physical or historical, I have been to a great extent thrown on my own researches; and obliged to seek for information in original sources, and in French and English versions of Oriental authorities. The results of my investigations are embodied in the following pages; and it only remains for me to express, in terms however inadequate, my obligations to the literary and scientific friends by whose aid I have been enabled to pursue my inquiries". Collaborators resident in Ceylon include, especially the Belfast born naturalist Robert Templeton and like Tennent a fellow Member of the Belfast Natural History Society who is thanked thus for his cordial assistance in numerous departments; but above all in relation to the physical geography and natural history of the island. Here his scientific knowledge, successfully cultivated during a residence of nearly twelve years in Ceylon, and his intimate familiarity with its zoology and productions, rendered his co-operation invaluable. Others were Dr. Cameron, of the Army Medical Staff (as was Templeton), Dr. Davy "when connected with the medical staff of the army from 1816 to 1820", William Ferguson, Esq., employed by the Survey Department of the Civil Service in Ceylon and a botanist, George Gardner and George Henry Kendrick Thwaites of the Botanic Gardens in Peradeniya, Edward Frederick Kelaart Edgar Leopold Layard as well as from officers of the Ceylon Civil Service; the Hon. Gerald C. Talbot, Mr. C.E. Buller, Mr. Mercer, Mr. Morris, Mr. Whiting, Major Skinner, and Mr. Mitford and Members of the Ceylon branch of the Royal Asiatic Society. Outside Ceylon Tennent thanks Roderick Murchison "without committing himself as to the controversial portions of the chapter on the Geology and Mineralogy of Ceylon) has done me the favour to offer some valuable suggestions, and to express his opinion as to the general accuracy of the whole", Joseph Dalton Hooker "And I have been permitted to submit the portion of my work which refers to this subject to the revision of the highest living authority on Indian botany", Thomas Henry Huxley, Frederic Moore of the East India House Museum, Robert Patterson also from Belfast and author of an Introduction to Zoology Adam White British Museum, John Edward Gray British Museum, Edward Blyth for the zealous and untiring energy with which he has devoted his attention and leisure to the identification of the various interesting species forwarded from Ceylon, and to their description in the Calcutta Journal. Michael Faraday "for some notes on the nature and qualities of the "Serpent Stone", Robert FitzRoy "for his most ingenious theory in elucidation of the phenomena of the Tides around Ceylon". In the historical sections Tennent remarks on contributions made by Julius von Mohl the literary executor of Eugène Burnouf, George Turnour "for access to his unpublished manuscripts; and to those portions of his correspondence with James Prinsep which relate to the researches of these two distinguished scholars regarding the Pali annals of Ceylon", Ernest de Saram Wijeyesekerev Karoonaratne, "the Maha-Moodliar and First Interpreter to the Governor", James De Alwis "translator of the Sidath Sangara", the Rev. Mr. Gogerly "of the Wesleyan Mission, " Rev. R. Spence Hardy "archæology of Buddhism" Mr. Cooley "author of the History of Maritime and Inland Discovery", Mr. Wylie of Shanghae, Mr. Lockhart of Shanghae and Stanislas Julien.

VOLUME 1

- PART I.PHYSICAL GEOGRAPHY.
  - CHAPTER 1 Geology—Mineralogy—Gems
  - CHAPTER 2 Climate—Health and Disease
  - CHAPTER 3 Vegetation—Trees and plants

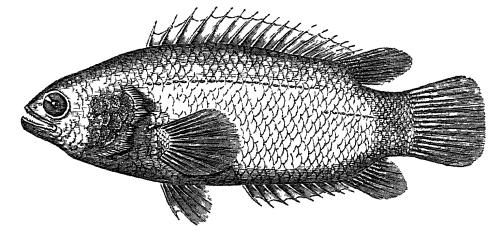
Figure from "Ceylon" the Anabas of the Dry Tanks. Wood engraving by Robert Templeton. A tank is a man made lake or pond (after ‘tanque’, the Portuguese word for reservoir).

- PART II ZOOLOGY.
  - CHAPTER I Mammalia
  - CHAPTER 2 Birds
  - CHAPTER 3 Reptiles
  - CHAPTER 4 Fishes
  - CHAPTER 5 Mollusca, Radiata and Acephalae
  - CHAPTER 6 Insects
  - CHAPTER 7 Arachnidae, Myriopoda, Crustacea, etc.
- PART III THE SINGHALESE CHRONICLES.
  - CHAPTER 1 Sources of Singhalese history – the Mahawanso
  - CHAPTER 2 The Aborigines
  - CHAPTER 3 Conquest of Wijayo, B.C. 543. – Establishment of Buddhism B.C. 307.
  - CHAPTER 4 The Buddhist Monuments.

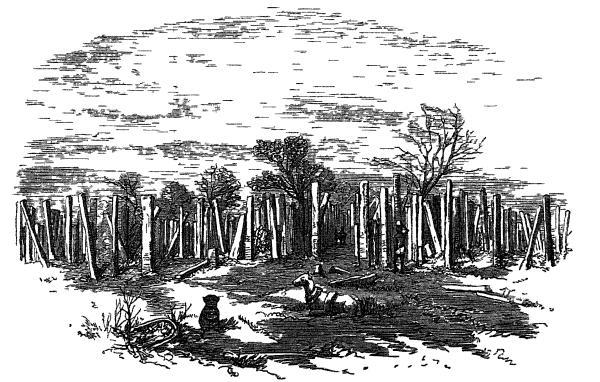
Figure from "Ceylon" Ruins of the Brazen Palace, wood engraving by Andrew Nicholl

  - CHAPTER 5 Singhalese Chivalry - Elala and Dutugaimunu
  - CHAPTER 6 The Influences of Buddhism on Civilisation
  - CHAPTER 7 Fate of the Aborigines (Naga people and Yaksha people)
  - CHAPTER 8 Extinction of the Great Dynasty (Vijaya B.C. 505 –MahasenaA.D. 302)
  - CHAPTER 9 Kings of the Lower Dynasty (Maha-Sen, A.D. 301, to the accession of Prakrama Bahu, A.D. 1153)
  - CHAPTER 10 Domination of the Malabars
  - CHAPTER 11 The Reign of Prakrama Baku
  - CHAPTER 12 Fate of the Singhalese Monarchy – Arrival of the Portuguese A.D. 1505
- PART IV SCIENCES AND SOCIAL ARTS.
  - CHAPTER 1 Population, caste, slavery and Raja-Kariya
  - CHAPTER 2 Agriculture, irrigation, cattle and crops
  - CHAPTER 3 Early commerce, shipping and productions
  - CHAPTER 4 Manufactures
  - CHAPTER 5 Working in metals
  - CHAPTER 6 Engineering

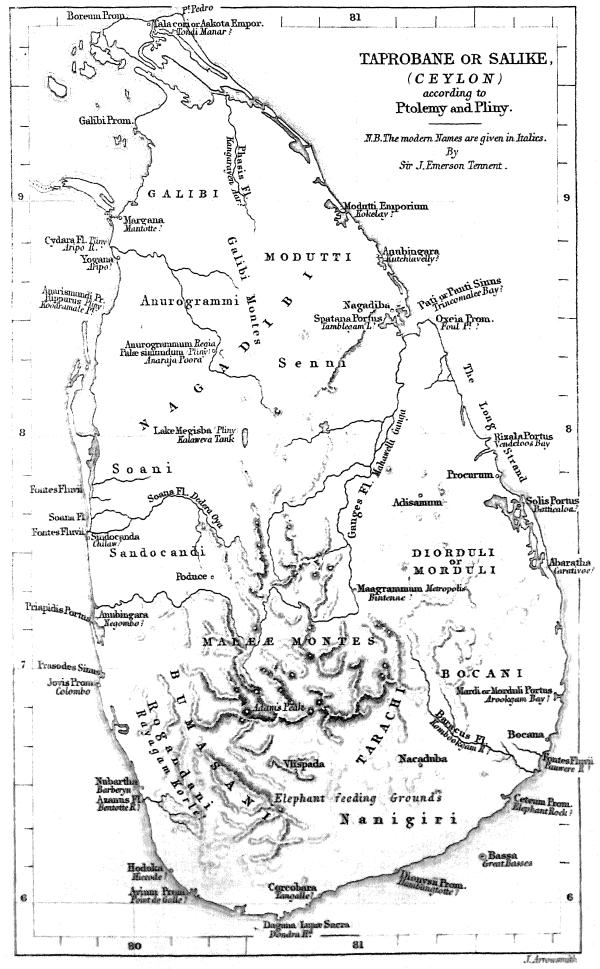
Map from Ceylon Ceylon as known to Ptolemy and Pliny, drawn by Sir J. Emerson Tennent

  - CHAPTER 7 The Fine Arts
  - CHAPTER 8 Social life
  - CHAPTER 9 Sciences
  - CHAPTER 10 Singhalese literature
- PART V MEDIEVAL HISTORY
  - CHAPTER 1 Ceylon as known to the Greeks and Romans
  - CHAPTER 2 Indian, Arabian, and Persian authorities
  - CHAPTER 3 Ceylon as known to the Chinese
  - CHAPTER 4 Ceylon as known to the Moors, Genoese and Venetians

Volume 2

- PART VI MODERN HISTORY.
  - CHAPTER 1 The Portuguese in Ceylon
  - CHAPTER 2 The Dutch in Ceylon
  - CHAPTER 3 The English period

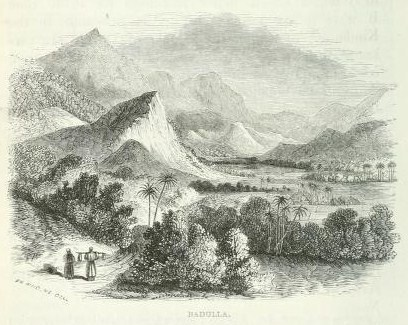
Plate from "Ceylon" The Coffee Regions. Badulla

- PART VII SOUTHERN AND CENTRAL PROVINCES
  - CHAPTER 1 Point de Galle
  - CHAPTER 2 Galle To Colombo
  - CHAPTER 3 Colombo
  - CHAPTER 4 The Ceylon Government, Revenue and Establishments - The country from Colombo to Kandy
  - CHAPTER 5 Kandy to Paradenia
  - CHAPTER 6 Gampola and the Coffee Districts
  - CHAPTER 7 Pusilawa and Neuera-Ellia
- PART VIII THE ELEPHANT
  - CHAPTER 1 Structure
  - CHAPTER 2 Habits
  - CHAPTER 3 Elephant shooting
  - CHAPTER 4 An Elephant corral
  - CHAPTER 5 The captives
  - CHAPTER 6 Conduct in captivity

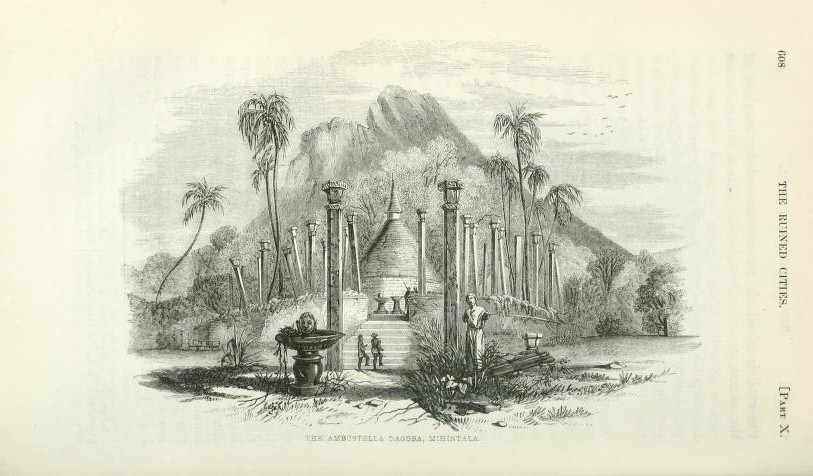
Plate from "Ceylon" The Ruined Cities - Ambustella Dagoba

- PART IX THE NORTHERN FORESTS.
  - CHAPTER 1 Forest travelling in Ceylon
  - CHAPTER 2 Bintenne — The Mahawelli–Ganga - The Ancient Tanks
  - CHAPTER 3 The Veddhas
  - CHAPTER 4 Batticaloa — "The Musical Fish " — The Salt Country
  - CHAPTER 5 Trincomalee — The Ebony Forests — The Salt Formations — The Great Tank of Padivil
  - CHAPTER 6 The Peninsula of Jaffna - The Palmyra Palm - The Tamils
  - CHAPTER 7 Adam's bridge and the islands — The Pearl Fishery
- PART X THE RUINED CITIES.
  - CHAPTER 1 Sigiri and Pollanarrua
  - CHAPTER 2 The Tank of Minery — Anarajapoora and the West Coast

== See also ==
- Sri Lankan place name etymology
- List of Sri Lankan monarchs
- An Historical Relation of the Island Ceylon
