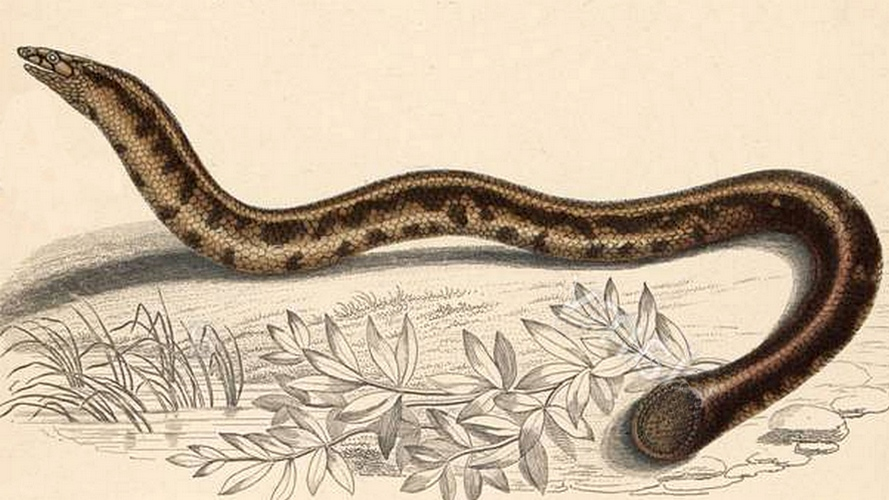

Conservation status
- Vulnerable (IUCN 3.1)

Scientific classification
- Kingdom: Animalia
- Phylum: Chordata
- Class: Reptilia
- Order: Squamata
- Suborder: Serpentes
- Family: Uropeltidae
- Genus: Rhinophis
- Species: R. saffragamus

Binomial name
- Rhinophis saffragamus (Kelaart, 1853)

Synonyms
- Pseudotyphlops Schlegel, 1839; Pseudotyphlops - M.A. Smith, 1943; Uropeltis philippinus Cuvier, 1829 (nomen nudum); Uropeltis philippina - Wagler, 1830 (nomen nudum); Uropeltis philippinus - J.P. Müller, 1832; Uropeltis philippinus; Eydoux & Gervais, 1837; Pseudotyphlops philippinus; Schlegel, 1839; Uropeltis saffragamus Kelaart, 1853; Uropeltis grandis Kelaart, 1853; Uropeltis pardalis Kelaart, 1853; Uropeltis grandis; Boulenger, 1893; Pseudotyphlops philippinus; M.A. Smith, 1943

= Rhinophis saffragamus =

Species of snake

Rhinophis saffragamus, the large shieldtail snake, is a species of snake in the family Uropeltidae, which is endemic to the island of Sri Lanka. No subspecies are currently recognized.

== Appearance and description ==
Thanks to similarities in reported phenotypes of snakes studied within the same region, a set of appearances for Rhinophis saffragamus can be concluded. These are named "grandis" and "pardalis", derived from the species synonymous names Uropeltis grandis (Kelaart, 1853) and Uropeltis pardalis (Kelaart, 1853).

There is no easily available and complete data that definitively ties specific features to these types, however, generally, "grandis"-type specimens are larger than "pardalis"-type specimens. Recorded lengths of "grandis" specimens vary from ~300 to 510 mm (12 to 20 in), while "pardalis" specimens varied from 148 to 230 mm (5.8 to 9.1 in). "Grandis" specimens are reported to be dark brown dorsally with darker spots on individual scales and a pale yellow venter. Contrarily, "pardalis" specimens are blackish-brown dorsally with scattered whiteish spots and a yellowish-white venter with scattered brown spots.

== Diet ==
The diet of shield-tail snakes in general consists mostly of earthworms. They may also consume termites, earwigs, and caterpillars, however, 80-90% of their stomach contents consists of earthworms. The distribution of shield-tail snakes in India is also tied to the presence or lack of earthworms.

== Geographic range ==
It is found in Sri Lanka in central and southern Uva and Sabaragamuwa Provinces. Vertical range is from near sea level to 900 m (2,950 ft) elevation.

The type locality given is "Philippinschen Inseln": in error, according to M.A. Smith (1943).

== Taxonomy ==
It is also mentioned in the synonymy of Ramphotyphlops, a genus of blind snakes, but then as a name proposed by Fitzinger in 1843. However, at the time this name was already preoccupied by Schlegel's Pseudo-typhlops (1839).
