= Nessia didactyla =

Two-toed Snake Skink

Conservation status
- Endangered (IUCN 3.1)

Scientific classification
- Kingdom: Animalia
- Phylum: Chordata
- Class: Reptilia
- Order: Squamata
- Family: Scincidae
- Genus: Nessia
- Species: N. didactyla

Binomial name
- Nessia didactyla (Deraniyagala, 1934)

Synonyms
- Acontias (Nessia) didactylus Deraniyagala, 1934; Nessia didactyla — M.A. Smith, 1935; Taylor, 1950; Nessia didactylus — Das, 1996; R. Somaweera & N. Somaweera, 2009

Species of lizard

Nessia didactyla, also known commonly as the two-toed nessia and the two-toed snakeskink, is a species of skink, a lizard in the subfamily Scincinae of the family Scincidae. The species is endemic to the island of Sri Lanka.

== Habitat and geographic distribution ==
A low hill to submountain skink species, N. didactyla is known from localities that lie at 500–1,000 m (1,600–3,300 ft) of elevation, including Polgahawela, Billegama, and Dewatura. Its preferred natural habitat is forest, but it has also been found in coconut plantations and home gardens.

== Description ==
N. didactyla has 24–28 scale rows at midbody. The snout is broad and blunt. The fronto-nasal is larger than the rostral, but slightly smaller than the frontal. The lower eyelid is scaly. Each limb has two digits, hence the scientific and common names. The pre-anals are slightly enlarged. The dorsum is brown, each scale with a darker border. Ventrally, it is light brown.

== Reproduction ==
N. didactyla is oviparous.
