= Miosynechodus =

Miosynechodus Temporal range: Miocene

Scientific classification
- Kingdom: Animalia
- Phylum: Chordata
- Class: Chondrichthyes
- Order: †Hybodontiformes
- Family: †Hybodontidae
- Genus: †Miosynechodus; Deraniyagala, 1969
- Species: †M. mora

Binomial name
- †Miosynechodus mora Deraniyagala, 1969

Genus of cartilaginous fishes

Miosynechodus is a dubious genus of extinct ray from the Miocene of Sri Lanka. It was originally identified as a fin spine from a late-surviving hybodontid, but it is now considered to be a myliobatiform tail stinger. A single species is known, Miosynechodus mora, which was named in 1969.

== Description ==
The holotype of Miosynechodus is a single tail stinger from Deraniyagala's personal collection. It measures 41 mm (1.6 in) in overall length, with a width of 10 mm (0.39 in) and a depth of 6 mm (0.24 in), and has five longitudinal grooves.
