= Rhinophis zigzag =

Zigzag shield-tail snake

Conservation status
- Data Deficient (IUCN 3.1)

Scientific classification
- Kingdom: Animalia
- Phylum: Chordata
- Class: Reptilia
- Order: Squamata
- Suborder: Serpentes
- Family: Uropeltidae
- Genus: Rhinophis
- Species: R. zigzag

Binomial name
- Rhinophis zigzag Gower & Maduwage, 2011

Species of snake

Rhinophis zigzag, also known as the Zigzag shield-tail snake or Zigzag Rhinophis is a species of snake in the family Uropeltidae. It is endemic to Sri Lanka.
