= Rhinophis erangaviraji =

Conservation status
- Critically Endangered (IUCN 3.1)

Scientific classification
- Kingdom: Animalia
- Phylum: Chordata
- Class: Reptilia
- Order: Squamata
- Suborder: Serpentes
- Family: Uropeltidae
- Genus: Rhinophis
- Species: R. erangaviraji

Binomial name
- Rhinophis erangaviraji L.J.M. Wickramasinghe, Vidanapathirana, N. Wickramasinghe & Ranwella, 2009

Species of snake

Rhinophis erangaviraji, also known commonly as Eranga Viraj's shieldtail snake, is a species of snake in the family Uropeltidae. The species is endemic to Sri Lanka, where it was discovered in the Rakwana area of Matara District.

== Habitat ==
The preferred natural habitats of R. erangaviraji are forest and grassland, at altitudes of 900–1,300 m (3,000–4,300 ft), but it has also been found in disturbed areas such as tea plantations and home gardens.

== Description ==
The species R. erangaviraji is easily distinguished from other shieldtails in Sri Lanka through colour variations. The head is black, with yellow irregular spots. The eyes are black. The body is black dorsally, with some yellow irregular patches. The ventral surface is cream-colored, with a stripe running along the vent region. The tail shield is black with small spines on it, which help to gather sand particles. Juveniles are similar to adults, but with a darker head and a paler body.

The largest paratype specimen has a snout-to-vent length of 29 cm (11 in).

== Behavior ==
R. erangaviraji is terrestrial and fossorial, burrowing as deep as 1 m (3.3 ft) in loose soil.

== Reproduction ==
Mating of R. erangaviraji may occur during July and August, as juveniles can be seen from October to January.

== Etymology ==
The specific name, erangaviraji, is in honour of Sri Lankan zoologist Eranga Viraj Dayarathne, who was an Instructor of the Reptiles group of the Young Zoologists’ Association of Sri Lanka, and Department of National Zoological Gardens.
