= Rhinophis dorsimaculatus =

Conservation status
- Endangered (IUCN 3.1)

Scientific classification
- Kingdom: Animalia
- Phylum: Chordata
- Class: Reptilia
- Order: Squamata
- Suborder: Serpentes
- Family: Uropeltidae
- Genus: Rhinophis
- Species: R. dorsimaculatus

Binomial name
- Rhinophis dorsimaculatus Deraniyagala, 1941

Species of snake

Rhinophis dorsimaculatus, commonly known as the polka-dot earth snake, is a species of snake in the Uropeltidae family. It is endemic to the scrub jungles of Sri Lanka.
