= Rhinophis tricoloratus =

Conservation status
- Endangered (IUCN 3.1)

Scientific classification
- Kingdom: Animalia
- Phylum: Chordata
- Class: Reptilia
- Order: Squamata
- Suborder: Serpentes
- Family: Uropeltidae
- Genus: Rhinophis
- Species: R. tricoloratus

Binomial name
- Rhinophis tricoloratus Deraniyagala, 1975

Synonyms
- Rhinophis tricolorata Deraniyagala, 1975

Species of snake

Rhinophis tricoloratus is a species of snake in the family Uropeltidae. It is endemic to Sri Lanka.
