= Aspidura copei =

Conservation status
- Endangered (IUCN 3.1)

Scientific classification
- Kingdom: Animalia
- Phylum: Chordata
- Class: Reptilia
- Order: Squamata
- Suborder: Serpentes
- Family: Colubridae
- Genus: Aspidura
- Species: A. copei

Binomial name
- Aspidura copei Günther,1864

Synonyms
- Aspidura copii Günther, 1864; Aspidura copei — Wall, 1921; Aspidura copii — M.A. Smith, 1943; Aspidura copei — Das, 1996; Aspidura copii — Wallach et al., 2014

Species of snake

Aspidura copei, commonly known as Cope's rough-sided snake or කලු මැඩිල්ලා (kalu medilla) in Sinhalese, is a species of snake in the family Colubridae. The species is endemic to Sri Lanka.

== Etymology ==
The specific name, copei, is in honor of American herpetologist and paleontologist Edward Drinker Cope.

== Geographic range ==
A. copei is found in the mountains of central Sri Lanka. Localities recorded are Dimbulla, Dickoya, Hopewell estate of Balangoda, Avissawella, and Pundaluoya.

== Description ==
The head of A. copei is indistinct from the neck, and the body is cylindrical. The dorsum is brown, with a brownish-olive mid-dorsal band, 2-3 scales wide, flanked on each side by a series of 23-26 dark blotches. The flanks have dark markings occupying 2-4 scales that reach the ventrals. The forehead is olive-brown, and the lips are light yellow, edged with black. A narrow dark band descends diagonally from the temporals, past the angle of the mouth to the edge of the ventrals. The venter is mottled green, with a series of solid blotches along the ventral midline.

Adults may attain a total length (including tail) of 63.5 centimetres (2 feet 1.0 inch).

== Behaviour ==
A. copei is a burrowing snake.

== Scalation ==
In A. copei, the dorsal scales are in 17 rows at midbody. Preoculars are absent. There are 2 postoculars in contact with the parietal. The ventrals number 123-137; and the subcaudals number 15-35.

== Reproduction ==
Details of the reproduction of A. copei are generally unknown. Only one female with 21 "remarkably round" eggs was found.
