= Rhinophis homolepis =

Conservation status
- Endangered (IUCN 3.1)

Scientific classification
- Kingdom: Animalia
- Phylum: Chordata
- Class: Reptilia
- Order: Squamata
- Suborder: Serpentes
- Family: Uropeltidae
- Genus: Rhinophis
- Species: R. homolepis

Binomial name
- Rhinophis homolepis Hemprich, 1820

Synonyms
- Rhinophis homolepis Hemprich, 1820; Depatnaya trevelyanii Kelaart, 1853; Mytilia gerrardi Gray, 1858; Rhinophis homolepis; Peters, 1861; Rhinophis trevelyanus; Boulenger, 1893; Rhinophis homolepis; M.A. Smith, 1943; Rhinchophis trevelyana; Gans, 1966; Rhinophis homolepis; Wickramasinghe et al., 2009

Species of snake

Rhinophis homolepis, commonly known as Trevelyan's earth snake, is a species of snake in the family Uropeltidae. It is endemic to the rain forests and grasslands of Sri Lanka.

== Description ==
Dorsum brown. A series of yellow triangular spots along each side of the body. Ventrum yellow, with a black spot on each scale.

Total length 27.5 cm (10 3/4 in).

Dorsal scales arranged in 17 rows at midbody (in 19 rows behind the head). Ventrals 190–204; subcaudals 3–6.

Snout acutely pointed. Rostral obtusely keeled above, about 2/5 the length of the shielded part of the head. Nasals separated by the rostral. Eye in the ocular shield. No supraoculars. Frontal usually longer than broad. No temporals. No mental groove. Diameter of body 26 to 30 times in the total length. Ventrals only slightly larger than the contiguous scales. Tail ending in a large rugose shield, which is neither truncated nor spinose at the end. Caudal disc as long as the shielded part of the head.
