= Rhinophis drummondhayi =

Conservation status
- Endangered (IUCN 3.1)

Scientific classification
- Kingdom: Animalia
- Phylum: Chordata
- Class: Reptilia
- Order: Squamata
- Suborder: Serpentes
- Family: Uropeltidae
- Genus: Rhinophis
- Species: R. drummondhayi

Binomial name
- Rhinophis drummondhayi Wall, 1921

Species of snake

Rhinophis drummondhayi, commonly known as Drummond-Hay's earth snake, is a species of snake in the family Uropeltidae. The species is endemic to Sri Lanka.

== Habitat ==
The preferred natural habitat of R. drummondhayi is forest, at altitudes of 900–1,500 m (3,000–4,900 ft), but it has also been found in agricultural habitats such as home gardens and tea pantations.

== Reproduction ==
R. drummondhayi is ovoviviparous.

== Etymology ==
The specific name, drummondhayi, is in honor of Henry Maurice Drummond-Hay (1869–1932), who was a planter and naturalist in Ceylon (now Sri Lanka), and who was the son of Scottish ornithologist Colonel Henry Maurice Drummond-Hay (1814–1896).
