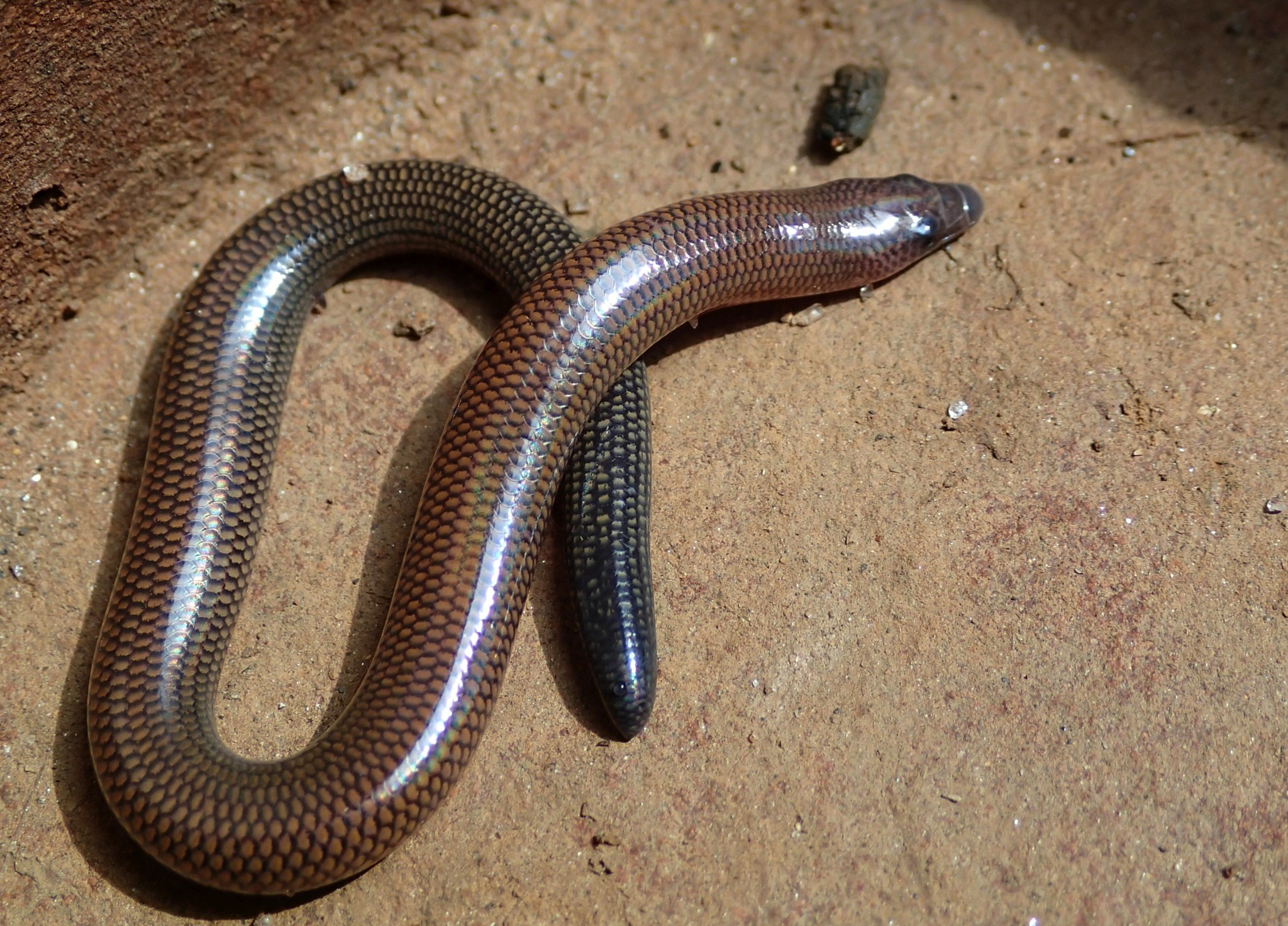

Conservation status
- Endangered (IUCN 3.1)

Scientific classification
- Kingdom: Animalia
- Phylum: Chordata
- Class: Reptilia
- Order: Squamata
- Family: Scincidae
- Genus: Nessia
- Species: N. monodactyla

Binomial name
- Nessia monodactyla (Gray, 1839)

= Nessia monodactyla =

Toeless Snake Skink

Species of lizard

The toeless snake skink (Nessia monodactyla), also known as the one-toed nessia, is a species of skink endemic to island of Sri Lanka.

== Habitat & distribution ==
Widely distributed in the wet climatic zones from 400-1500m, and known localities include Kandy, Nawalapitiya, Deniyaya, and Peradeniya.

== Description ==
Midbody scales rows 26-28. Body is slender and of equal girth, from head to tail. Snout short and obtuse. Lower eyelid with a transparent disk. Limbs lacking digits. Dorsum brown, dark or gray black.

== Ecology & diet ==
Hides under rubble, decaying logs and in soil or humus in montane forests. When exposed, they immediately wriggle into loose soil or under rubble. Diet comprises insects.

== Reproduction ==
2 eggs are laid in loose soil.
