= Rhinophis porrectus =

Conservation status
- Endangered (IUCN 3.1)

Scientific classification
- Kingdom: Animalia
- Phylum: Chordata
- Class: Reptilia
- Order: Squamata
- Suborder: Serpentes
- Family: Uropeltidae
- Genus: Rhinophis
- Species: R. porrectus

Binomial name
- Rhinophis porrectus Wall, 1921

Species of snake

Rhinophis porrectus, or Willey's earth snake, is a species of snake in the family Uropeltidae. It is endemic to Sri Lanka.

== Etymology ==
The specific name, porrectus, is Latin for "stretched" and refers to the high number of ventrals. The common name, Willey's earth snake, refers to "Dr. Willey" who collected the holotype specimen in 1903.

== Description ==
Head blackish-brown. Tip of snout dull orange. A narrow blackish-brown vertebral stripe from nape to vent. A wider whitish stripe on either side. Remainder of body blackish-brown, the scales with whitish margins. Caudal shield dull orange, with a dark subterminal band.

Total length 35.5 cm (14 inches).

Dorsal scales in 17 rows (in 19 rows behind the head). Ventrals 281. Anal plate divided, twice as broad as the ventrals. Subcaudals 3.

Head very small. Snout acutely pointed. Rostral sharply keeled above, 2 times the length of the frontal, more than ½ the length of the shielded part of the head. Eye very small, its diameter less than ⅓ the horizontal diameter of the ocular shield. Frontal as broad as long, shorter than the parietals. Body very elongate, midbody diameter 76 times in the total length. Ventrals 4/3 the breadth of the contiguous scales. Tail short. Caudal shield 3/4 to 4/5 the length of the shielded part of the head.
