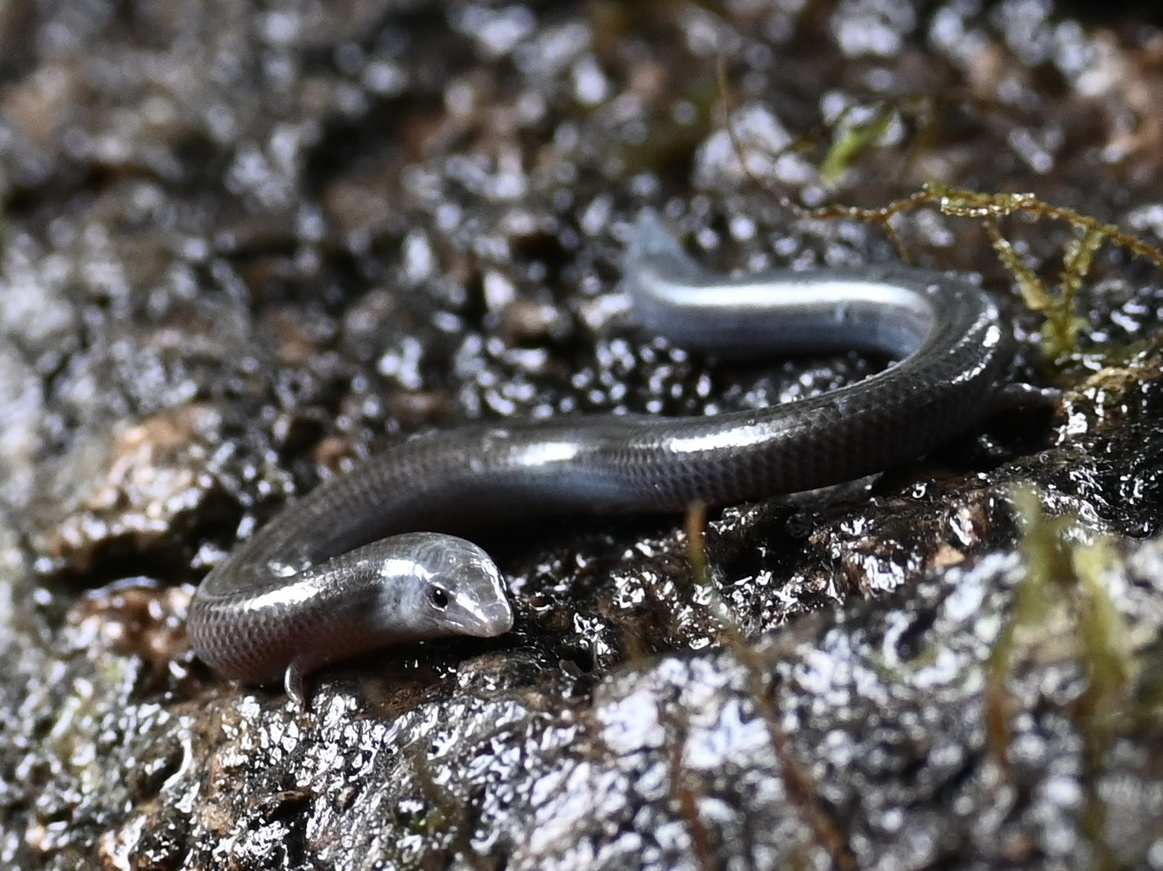

Conservation status
- Near Threatened (IUCN 3.1)

Scientific classification
- Kingdom: Animalia
- Phylum: Chordata
- Class: Reptilia
- Order: Squamata
- Family: Scincidae
- Genus: Nessia
- Species: N. gansi

Binomial name
- Nessia gansi Batuwita & Edirisinghe, 2017

= Nessia gansi =

Species of lizard

Nessia gansi, also known commonly as Gans's three-toed snake skink, is a species of lizard in the family Scincidae. The species is endemic to the island of Sri Lanka.

== Habitat and distribution ==
N. gansi is restricted to low-land wet zones up to 100 m (330 ft). Known localities include Ambalangoda, Kanneliya Forest Reserve, Kottawa, Mount Rumaswala, Imaduwa and Kottawa.

== Description ==
N. gansi has the following characters. The midbody scales are in 22-26 rows. The ventral scales number 103-114. There are 93-105 paravertebral dorsal scales. The snout is acutely pointed. There are four limbs, and each limb has three digits. The dorsum is dark brown, with each dorsal scale having a distinct posterior dark spot, and the venter is dusky brown.

== Ecology ==
N. gansi prefers damp forests or home gardens. In home gardens, it is found in loose soil, in leaf debris, close to rubbish heaps.

== Reproduction ==
N. gansi is oviparous.

== Etymology ==
The specific name, gansi, is in honour of American herpetologist Carl Gans.
