= Nessia deraniyagalai =

Conservation status
- Data Deficient (IUCN 3.1)

Scientific classification
- Kingdom: Animalia
- Phylum: Chordata
- Class: Reptilia
- Order: Squamata
- Family: Scincidae
- Genus: Nessia
- Species: N. deraniyagalai

Binomial name
- Nessia deraniyagalai Taylor, 1950

Species of lizard

Nessia deraniyagalai, commonly known as Deraniyagala's snake skink, Deraniyagala's snakeskink, or Deraniyagala's nessia, is a species of limbless lizard in the family Scincidae. The species is endemic to the island of Sri Lanka.

== Etymology ==
The specific name, deraniyagalai, is in honor of Sri Lankan zoologist Paulus Edward Pieris Deraniyagala.

== Habitat and distribution ==
N. deraniyagala is known only from dry northeastern Sri Lanka, where a single specimen was collected north of Trincomalee, near the shore, on a small hillock of about 10 m (33 ft) elevation.

== Description ==
N. deraniyagalai has scales in 20 rows at midbody. The loreals are paired, the anterior much higher. The frontoparietal is broader than the frontal. The lower eyelid is movable. There are five supralabials, the first long, the second under the orbit.

The dorsum is brown, each scale with a dark brown spot, giving the appearance of longitudinal stripes. A blackish brown area above the eye continues to the top of the snout.

== Reproduction ==
N. deraniyagalai is oviparous.
