= Edith Maud Drummond-Hay =

Scottish nurse and amateur artist (1872–1960)

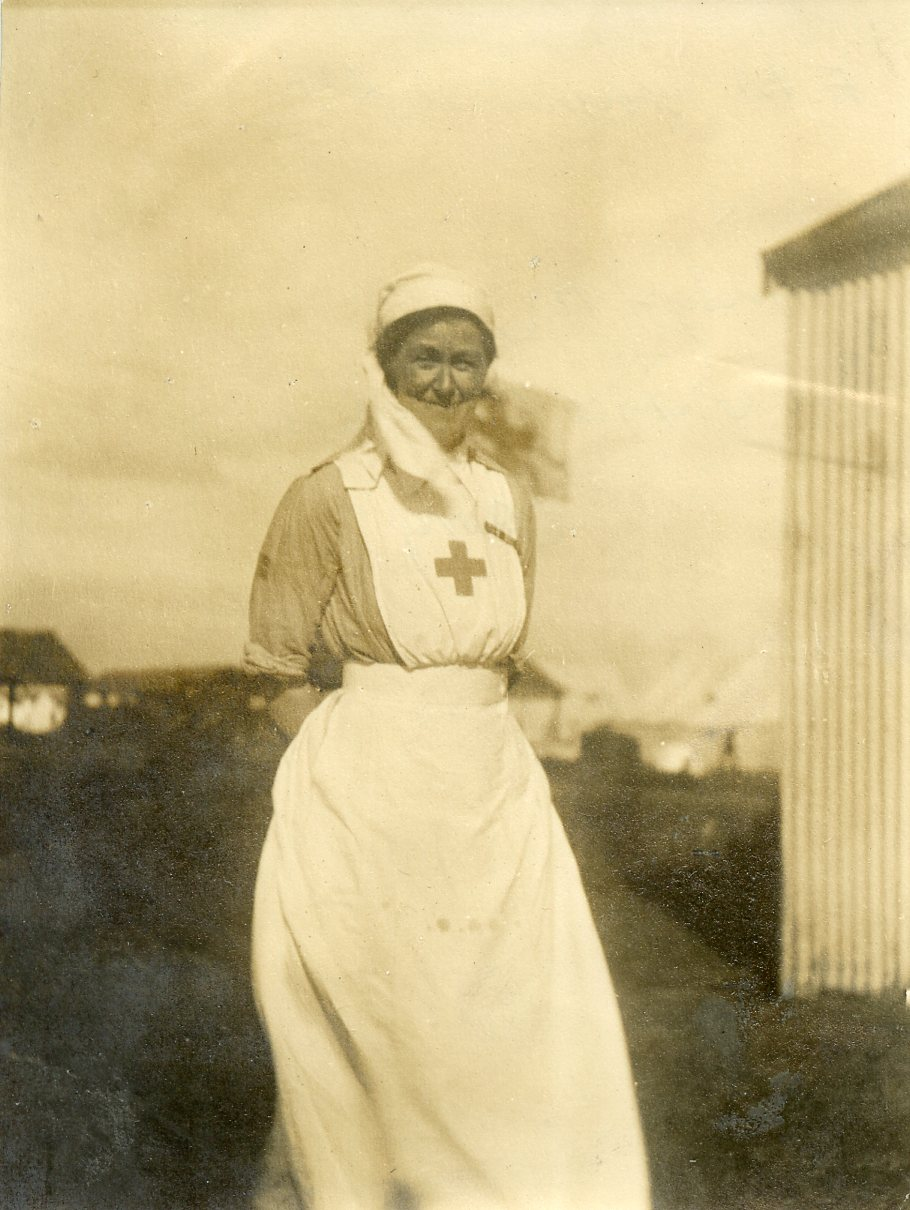
- Drummond-Hay at a Junior OTC Camp in Barry, 1922. (British Red Cross Museum and Archives)
- Born: 28 February 1872; Perthshire, Scotland
- Died: 20 February 1960 (aged 87)
- Branch: British Red Cross Voluntary Aid Detachment
- Service years: 1914-1919
- Known for: VAD nurse and wartime artist
- Awards: Royal Red Cross (RRC) 2nd class
- Website: https://museumandarchives.redcross.org.uk/objects/7536

Edith Maud Drummond-Hay (1872–1960) was a Scottish Voluntary Aid Detachment (VAD) nurse and amateur artist who documented her First World War experiences with detailed sketches of life in military hospitals in Scotland and France. She was awarded the Associate of the Royal Red Cross (RRC 2nd Class) medal in 1919 in recognition of her service in France. Her albums were discovered by family members after her death and are now held in the archives of the British Red Cross. They provide a vivid pictorial record of her wartime experiences.

== Early life ==
Edith Maud Drummond-Hay was born on 28 February 1872 in Kinfauns, Perthshire to Henry Maurice Drummond, a renowned ornithologist, and Charlotte Elizabeth Richardson Hay. When her parents married, they had each taken the others' surname and become Drummond-Hay. Edith had three sisters, Alice, Constance and Lucy, and two brothers, James and Harry. The 1891 census records the family as residing at Seggieden Mansion House.

== Wartime volunteering ==
Drummond-Hay joined the British Red Cross VAD as a nurse at the start of the war. She was initially stationed at the Auxiliary Hospital in Perth, in what is now the A. K. Bell Library, before being transferred to Abbey Auxiliary Hospital in Fort Augustus. In March 1917, when aged 45, she was sent to France, where she served at a number of hospitals close to the front line. She worked at No III Stationary Hospital, attached to the British Expeditionary Force at Barnatal, near Rouen; the Sick Sister's Hospital, Abbeville; and No 8 Stationary Hospital, Boulogne. She remained in Abbeville until she was demobilised in May 1919. She was awarded the Associate of the Royal Red Cross (RRC 2nd class) medal in the 1919 Birthday Honours List in recognition of "valuable services with the Armies in France and Flanders".

== Wartime artist ==
During her service in the VAD, she kept meticulous sketches capturing the experiences of life inside military hospitals in Perth and France. These pictorial diaries were discovered in an album after her death, when her nephew Peter Drummond-Hay moved into her old house in Glencarse in the 1980s. The illustrated, 174 page sketchbook was donated to the British Red Cross Museum and Archives, which has digitised some of the images. Many are colourful watercolours and contain locations, dates and the names of the people featured in them, creating a valuable wartime record and insight into the lives ordinary soldiers and nursing volunteers.

== Later life and death ==
Drummond-Hay moved to Glencarse, Perthshire and continued to volunteer with the British Red Cross in her community throughout her life, and was known as a 'pillar' of her church. She was known as 'Aunt Tuck' to her nieces and nephews. Her niece Anneli Drummond-Hay became an equestrian.

Drummond-Hay died aged 87 on 20 February 1960 at Burghmuir Hospital in Perth.
