= Rhinophis philippinus =

Conservation status
- Endangered (IUCN 3.1)

Scientific classification
- Kingdom: Animalia
- Phylum: Chordata
- Class: Reptilia
- Order: Squamata
- Suborder: Serpentes
- Family: Uropeltidae
- Genus: Rhinophis
- Species: R. philippinus

Binomial name
- Rhinophis philippinus (Cuvier, 1829)

Synonyms
- Typhlops philippinus Cuvier, 1829; Rhinophis philippinus – J.P. Müller, 1832; Rhinophis planiceps Peters, 1861; Rhinophis philippinus – M.A. Smith, 1943

Species of snake

Rhinophis philippinus, also known as Peter's earth snake or Peter's Philippine earth snake, is a species of snake in the family Uropeltidae. It is endemic to Sri Lanka.

== Description ==
Brown dorsally and ventrally, each scale with a lighter margin. Some specimens have a yellowish blotch near the head or on the anal region.

Total length 27 cm (10 3/4 in).

Dorsal scales arranged in 17 rows at midbody (in 19 rows behind the head). Ventrals 153–172; subcaudals 3–6.

Snout acutely pointed. Rostral obtusely keeled above, about 2/5 the length of the shielded part of the head. Nasals separated by the rostral. Eye in the ocular shield. No supraoculars. Frontal usually longer than broad. No temporals. No mental groove. Diameter of body 24 to 34 times in the total length. Ventrals only slightly larger than the contiguous scales. Tail ending in a large convex rugose shield, which is neither truncated nor spinose at the end. Caudal disc about as long as the shielded part of the head.
