= Henry Drummond-Hay =

Scottish naturalist and ornithologist

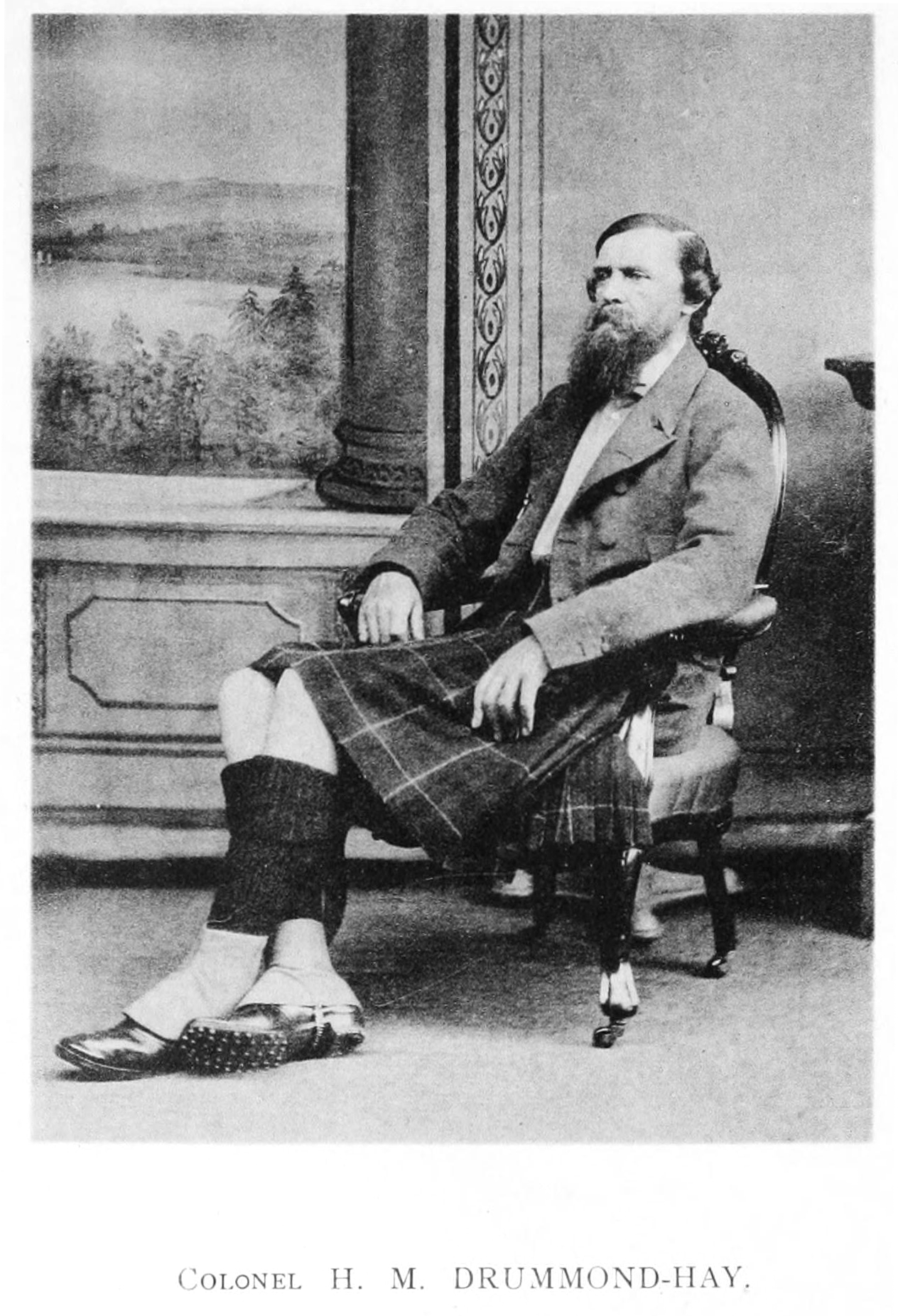

Colonel Henry Maurice Drummond-Hay (7 June 1814 – 3 January 1896) was a Scottish naturalist and ornithologist.

He was the son of Vice-Admiral Sir Adam Drummond, K.C.B., of Megginch Castle, Perthshire. In June 1832 he received his commission in the 42nd Royal Highlanders, serving in Ireland, Malta, Corfu, Bermuda, and Halifax, Nova Scotia.

Drummond-Hay was the first president of the British Ornithologists' Union and one of its twenty founders in 1858.

On his marriage to Charlotte Elizabeth Richardson Hay, the heiress of Seggieden, in 1859 he took her family name of Hay. For the last twenty years of his life he devoted himself to the natural history of Perthshire and Tayside, especially the formation of the Perth Museum.

His son, also named Henry Maurice Drummond-Hay (1869–1932), was a naturalist and a planter in British Ceylon (now Sri Lanka). The son is commemorated in the scientific names of two species of snakes, Aspidura drummondhayi and Rhinophis drummondhayi. His daughter Edith Maud Drummond-Hay was a Voluntary Aid Detachment nurse in World War I who kept meticulous sketches of life in military hospitals in Perth and France. She was awarded the Royal Red Cross (RRC 2nd Class) medal in the 1919 Birthday Honours in recognition of her service in France.
