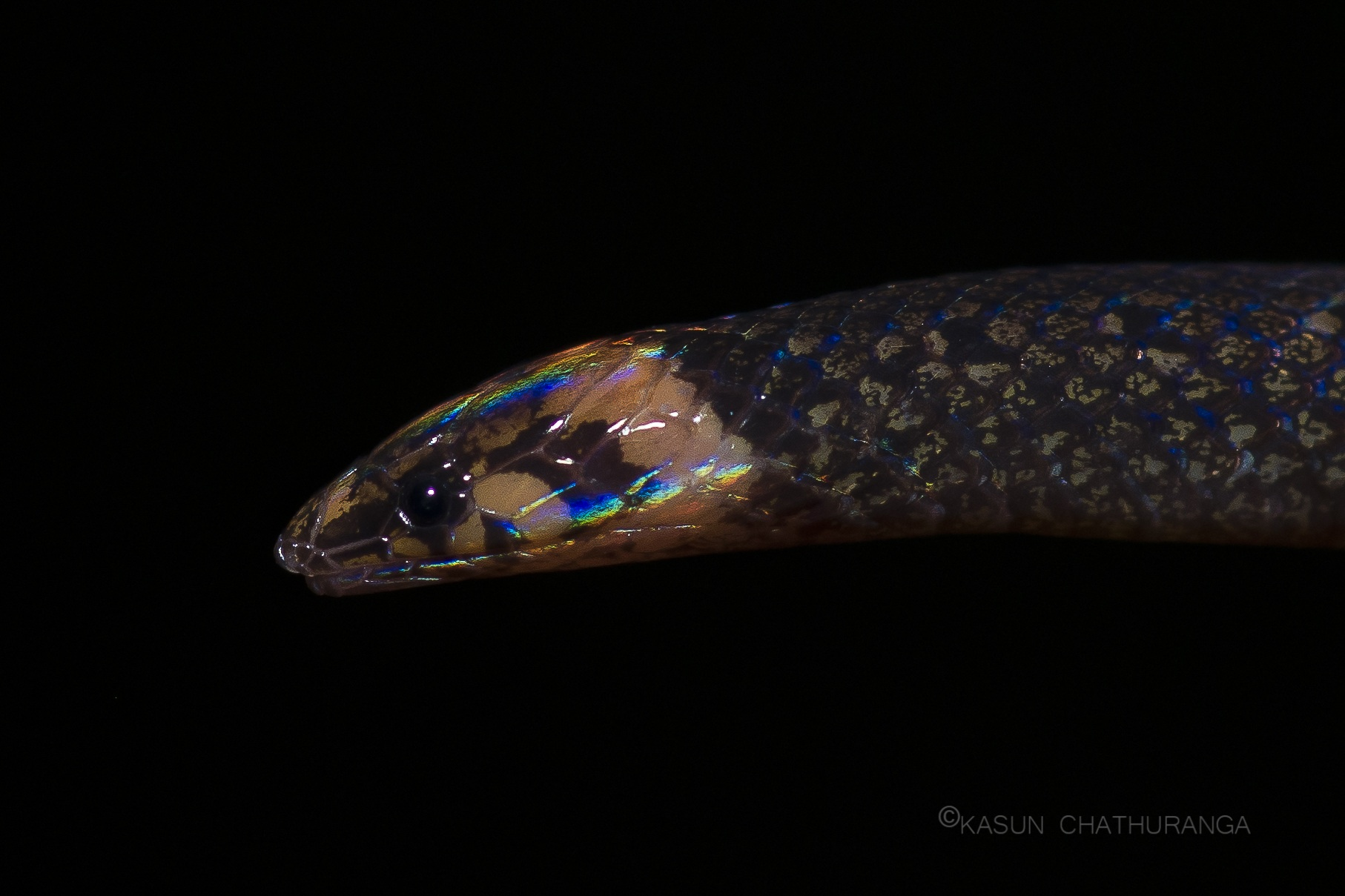

Conservation status
- Vulnerable (IUCN 3.1)

Scientific classification
- Kingdom: Animalia
- Phylum: Chordata
- Class: Reptilia
- Order: Squamata
- Suborder: Serpentes
- Family: Colubridae
- Genus: Aspidura
- Species: A. guentheri

Binomial name
- Aspidura guentheri Ferguson, 1876

= Aspidura guentheri =

Species of snake

Aspidura guentheri, commonly known as Günther's rough-sided snake, is a species of snake in the family Colubridae. The species is endemic to Sri Lanka. It is the smallest member of the genus Aspidura.

== Etymology ==
The specific name, guentheri, is named after the German-born British herpetologist Albert Günther.

== Geographic range ==
A. guentheri is a burrowing snake restricted to the lowlands of Sri Lanka. Localities recorded include Ratnapura, Deniyaya, Yapitikanda, Kandilpana, Kosgama, Kalutara, and Balangoda at altitudes of 100–500 m (330–1,640 ft).

== Description ==
The head of A. guentheri is indistinct from the neck, and the body is cylindrical. The dorsum is brown, mottled with dark brown. The forehead is dark, and a pale neck band is present. Running down the back are three rows of dark spots, one vertebral row and two lateral rows. The ventral side is light brown.

== Scalation ==
A. guentheri has the following scalation. The dorsal scales are in 17 rows at midbody. One preocular is present. There are two postoculars, only the upper in contact with the parietal. The ventrals number 101-116, and the subcaudals 19-26.

== Ecology ==
The diet of A. guentheri comprises mainly earthworms.

== Reproduction ==
A. guentheri is oviparous. Clutches of one to three eggs are laid.
