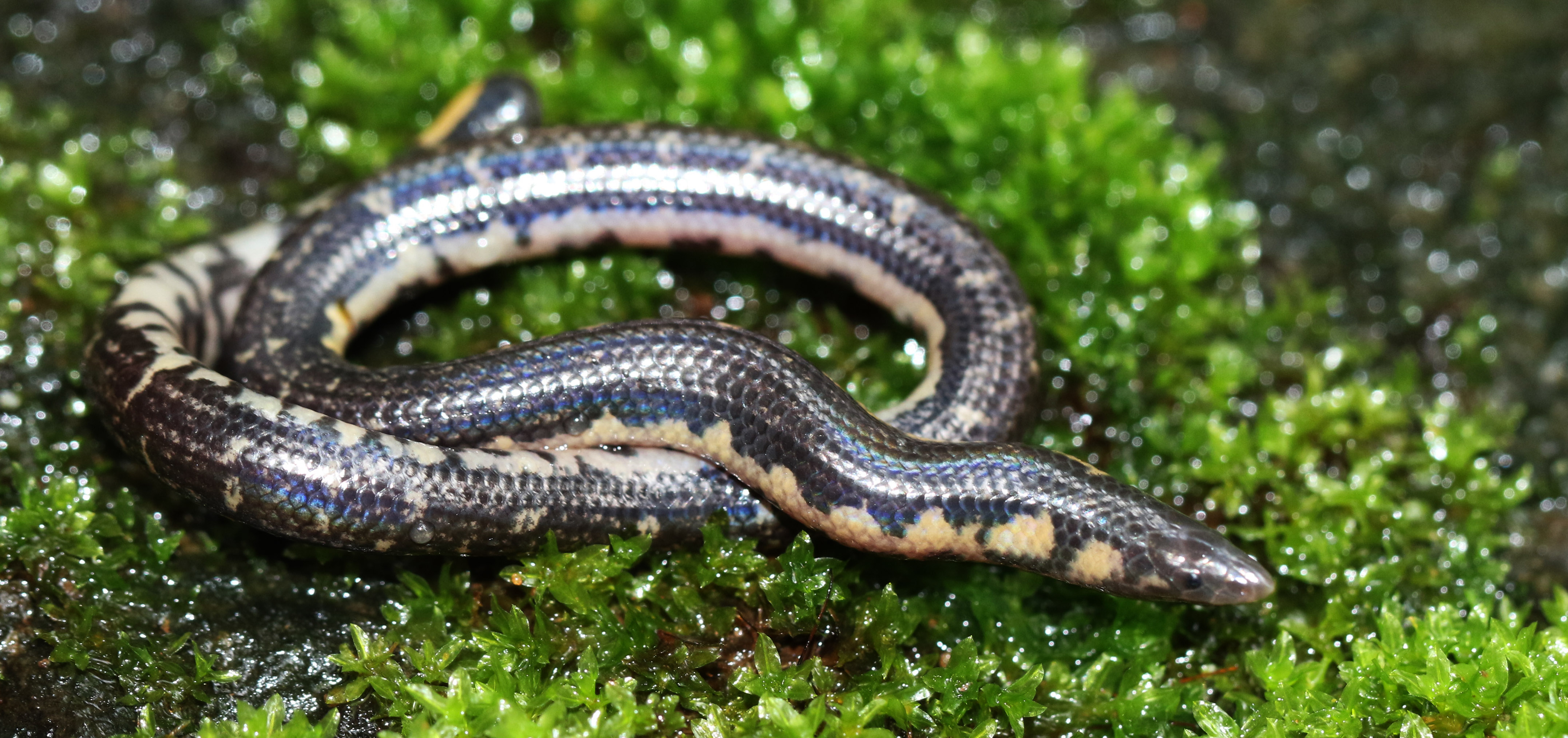

Scientific classification
- Kingdom: Animalia
- Phylum: Chordata
- Order: Squamata
- Suborder: Serpentes
- Family: Uropeltidae
- Genus: Rhinophis
- Species: R. siruvaniensis

Binomial name
- Rhinophis siruvaniensis Cyriac, Umesh, Achyuthan, Vidisha Kulkarni & Ganesh, 2025

= Rhinophis siruvaniensis =

Species of snake

Rhinophis siruvaniensis, is a species of snake in the family Uropeltidae. The species is endemic to the Siruvani Hills in the Western Ghats of India.

== Etymology ==
The specific name, siruvaniensis, is from its known distribution, the Siruvani Hills.

== Description ==
Rhinophis siruvaniensis is dark brownish black on its dorsum and creamy white on its ventral with irregular patches projecting ventrolaterally.

Juveniles are around 12–14 cm (4 3/4–5 1/2 in) long including the tail and adults are known to reach up to 30 cm (11 3/4 in) long including the tail.

The dorsal scales are in 17 rows at midbody and the ventrals number 202-205, and there are 4-8 pairs of subcaudals.

The snout is acutely pointed. The eye bulges slightly out of the ocular shield. The frontal is longer than broad. The tail ends in a large convex rugose shield, with several narrow, evenly spaced, broken ridges, somewhat tapering towards the tip.

== Distribution and habitat ==
Rhinophis siruvaniensis is only known from its type locality, the Siruvani Hills. It lives between 800–1100 m in wet evergreen forests. The species is also found in villages and spice plantations. The holotype was discovered within cardamom and coffee plantations. Other specimens have been found under fallen logs and rocks. They are found in burrows up to 30 cm (11 3/4 in) deep.

== Conservation ==
Rhinophis siruvaniensis has only been found in unprotected areas, largely in coffee and spice plantations. The genus has been known to be very sensitive to changes in their environment due to their specialized burrowing behavior. The species has also been known to be roadkill and is sometimes wounded or killed while digging for farming.
