= Rhinophis oxyrhynchus =

Conservation status
- Data Deficient (IUCN 3.1)

Scientific classification
- Kingdom: Animalia
- Phylum: Chordata
- Class: Reptilia
- Order: Squamata
- Suborder: Serpentes
- Family: Uropeltidae
- Genus: Rhinophis
- Species: R. oxyrhynchus

Binomial name
- Rhinophis oxyrhynchus (Schneider, 1801)

Synonyms
- Typhlops oxyrhynchus Schneider, 1801; Dapatnaya lankadivana Kelaart, 1853; Mytilia unimaculata Gray, 1858; Rhinophis oxyrhynchus – Beddome, 1886

Species of snake

Rhinophis oxyrhynchus, also known as Schneider's earth snake or Schneider's shieldtail, is a species of uropeltid snake endemic to Sri Lanka.

== Geographic range ==
It is found in Sri Lanka in the Northern and Eastern Provinces (Mullaitivu, Vavoniya, Trincomalee).

Type locality of Typhlops oxyrhyncus: "India orientali".

Type locality of Dapatnaya lankadivana: "Trincomalie, and [...] the Kandyan Province".

Type locality of Mytilia unimaculata: "Ceylon".

== Description ==
Brown dorsally and ventrally, each scale with a lighter margin. Tail with some yellow markings.

Adults may attain a total length of 43 cm (16 7/8 in).

Dorsal scales arranged in 17 or 19 rows at midbody (in 19 or 21 rows behind the head). Ventrals 217–227; subcaudals 5–7.

Snout acutely pointed. Rostral laterally compressed, keeled above, ½ as long as the shielded part of the head. Nasals separated by the rostral. Eye in the ocular shield. No supraoculars. Frontal not longer than broad. No temporals. No mental groove. Tail ending in a large convex rugose shield, which is neither truncated nor spinose at the end. Diameter of body 37 to 39 times in the total length. Ventrals only slightly larger than the contiguous scales. Caudal disc about as long as the shielded part of the head.
