= Nessia burtonii =

Conservation status
- Near Threatened (IUCN 3.1)

Scientific classification
- Kingdom: Animalia
- Phylum: Chordata
- Class: Reptilia
- Order: Squamata
- Family: Scincidae
- Genus: Nessia
- Species: N. burtonii

Binomial name
- Nessia burtonii Gray, 1839

Synonyms
- Nessia burtonii Gray, 1839; Acontias burtonii — Boulenger, 1887; Nessia burtonii — M.A. Smith, 1935

Species of lizard

Nessia burtonii, commonly known as Burton's nessia, Gray's snake skink, or the three-toed snakeskink, is a species of skink, a lizard in the family Scincidae. The species is endemic to the island of Sri Lanka.

== Etymology ==
The specific name, burtonii, is in honor of British army surgeon Edward Burton (1790–1867).

== Habitat and geographic range ==
N. burtonii occurs in the wet zone of Sri Lanka. It is sub-fossorial and occurs under leaf litter, boulders, and decaying logs in a variety of habitats: forests, plantations, and home gardens.

== Description ==
N. burtoni has 24–26 scale rows at midbody. The body is slender and of equal girth from head to tail. The snout is acute. Each limb has three tiny clawed toes, hence one of the common names. The dorsum is brown or light reddish brown, each scale with a darker edge. The venter is creamy or may be gray.

== Ecology and diet ==
N. burtonii hides during the day, under rubble, decaying logs, and in leaf litter within submontane forests, up to 1,200 m (3,900 ft). When exposed, it immediately wriggles into loose soil or under rubble. When caught, it regurgitates its food, presumably as a predator-deflection response. It forages at night on insects and possibly earthworms.

== Reproduction ==
N. burtoni is oviparous. Two eggs are laid in loose soil..
