= Aspidura drummondhayi =

Conservation status
- Endangered (IUCN 3.1)

Scientific classification
- Kingdom: Animalia
- Phylum: Chordata
- Class: Reptilia
- Order: Squamata
- Suborder: Serpentes
- Family: Colubridae
- Genus: Aspidura
- Species: A. drummondhayi

Binomial name
- Aspidura drummondhayi Boulenger, 1904

Species of snake

Aspidura drummondhayi, commonly known as Drummond-Hay's rough-sided snake or කෙටිවල් මැඩිල්ලා (ketiwal medilla) in Sinhala, is a species of snake in the family Colubridae. The species is endemic to Sri Lanka.

== Etymology ==
The specific name, drummondhayi, is in honor of Henry Maurice Drummond-Hay (1869–1932), who was a planter and naturalist in Ceylon (now Sri Lanka), and who was the son of Scottish ornithologist Colonel Henry Maurice Drummond-Hay (1814–1896).

== Geographic range ==
A. drummondhayi is a burrowing snake from the low hills of southwestern Sri Lanka. Localities recorded are Balangoda region, and from Sinharaja, at elevations over 1,200 m (3,900 ft).

== Description ==
The head of A. drummondhayi is indistinct from the neck, and the body is cylindrical. The dorsum is chocolate-brown with faint mottling. A dark vertebral stripe, one scale wide, runs from the snout to the tail tip. There are two pairs of faint dark stripes on the paravertebral region of each side. The forehead is dark. The venter is light brown with faint mottling.

== Scalation ==
A. drummondhayi has dorsal scales arranged in 15 rows at midbody. Preoculars are absent. There are 2 postoculars which are in contact with the parietal. Ventrals number 113-119. Subcaudals number 18-26.

== Reproduction ==
Drummond-Hay's rough-sided snake is known to lay 4 eggs at a time.
