= William Ferguson (botanist) =

- Born: 1820
- Died: 1887 (aged 66–67); Ceylon

William Ferguson FRSE FLS DL FGS (1820–1887), was a botanist and entomologist. He specialised in algae and ferns.

== Career ==
Ferguson entered the Ceylon civil service in 1839, arriving in the island in December of that year. Here he lived until his death on 31 July 1887. He occupied his leisure time in botanical and entomological studies, gaining an intimate knowledge of the flora and insect life of the island, and publishing from time to time the results of his observations and researches in The Ceylon Observer and the Tropical Agriculturist. His work obtained recognition from Dr. Hooker and other eminent biologists (see Ceylon, Physical, Historical and Topographical). With Albert Grunow he issued the exsiccata Algae Ceylanicae, legit W. Ferguson, determ. A. Grunow.

Also, in the scientific field of herpetology, Ferguson described two new species of reptiles, Aspidura guentheri and Cnemaspis scalpensis.

In 1874 he was elected a Fellow of the Royal Society of Edinburgh. His proposers were William Dickson, David MacLagan, Thomas Brown and John MacGregor McCandlish. He died on 31 July 1887 in Colombo, Ceylon.

== Publications ==
see

1. The Palmyra Palm, Borassus flabelliformis. A popular Description of the Palm and its Products, having special reference to Ceylon, with a valuable Appendix, embracing extracts from nearly every Author that has noticed the Tree. Illustrated by wood engravings. Colombo, 1850, quarto.
2. Correspondence with Sir J. Emerson Tennent on the Botany of Ceylon.
3. A Plan of the Summit of Adam's Peak.
4. Scripture Botany of Ceylon (1859)
5. A Descriptive List of Ceylon Timber Trees (1863)
6. Ceylon Ferns (1872)
7. Reptile Fauna of Ceylon (1877).
8. Ceylon Ferns and Their Allies (1880)

He also left materials for a monograph on luminous beetles, including fireflies and glowworms, and a vast mass of miscellaneous notes of a scientific character.
