= Ramboda =

- Village
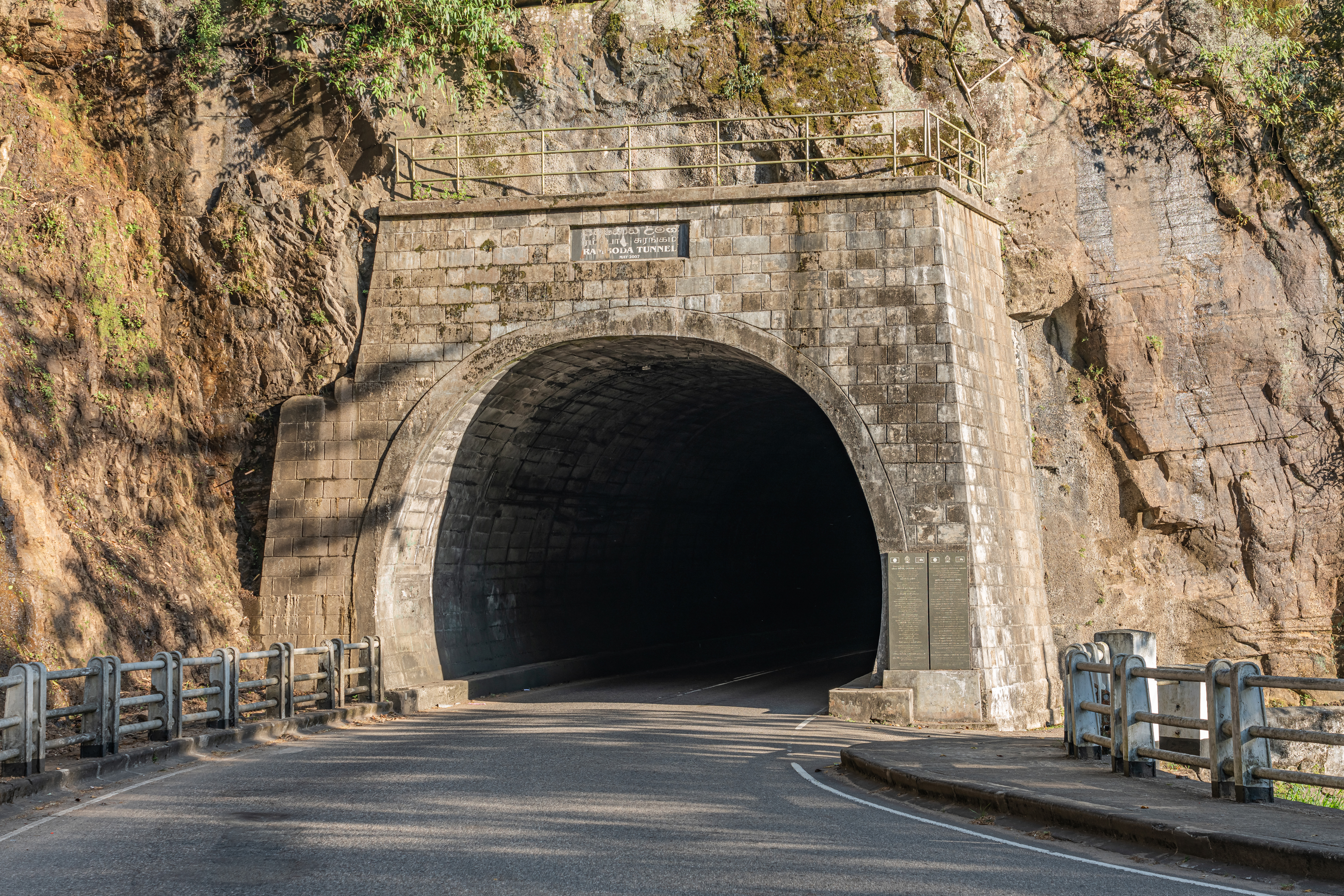
- Ramboda Tunnel

- Location within Sri Lanka
- Coordinates: 7°3′N 80°42′E
- Country: Sri Lanka
- Province: Central Province
- District: Nuwara Eliya
- Time zone: UTC+5:30 (Sri Lanka Standard Time)

Ramboda is a village in Sri Lanka. It is located within Central Province.

The Ramboda Road Tunnel is currently the longest road tunnel in Sri Lanka and is situated on the A5 highway (Perandenyia – Nuwara Eliya Road), close to Ramboda falls. It is 225 m (738 ft) long, 7 m (23 ft) wide and 5.6 m (18 ft) high. Construction of the tunnel began in 2006, and it opened in February 2008. The tunnel cost Rs. 2,000M and was substantially funded by the Japanese Government. The 1,000 rupee banknote, issued 4 February 2011, features an artist's impression of the Ramboda tunnel, with the rock wall at the same location before construction.

The Wavenden Estate in Ramboda was the birthplace of the British Admiral of the Fleet, Lord Fisher.

== See also ==
- List of towns in Central Province, Sri Lanka
