= Namunukula =

Mountain range in Sri Lanka

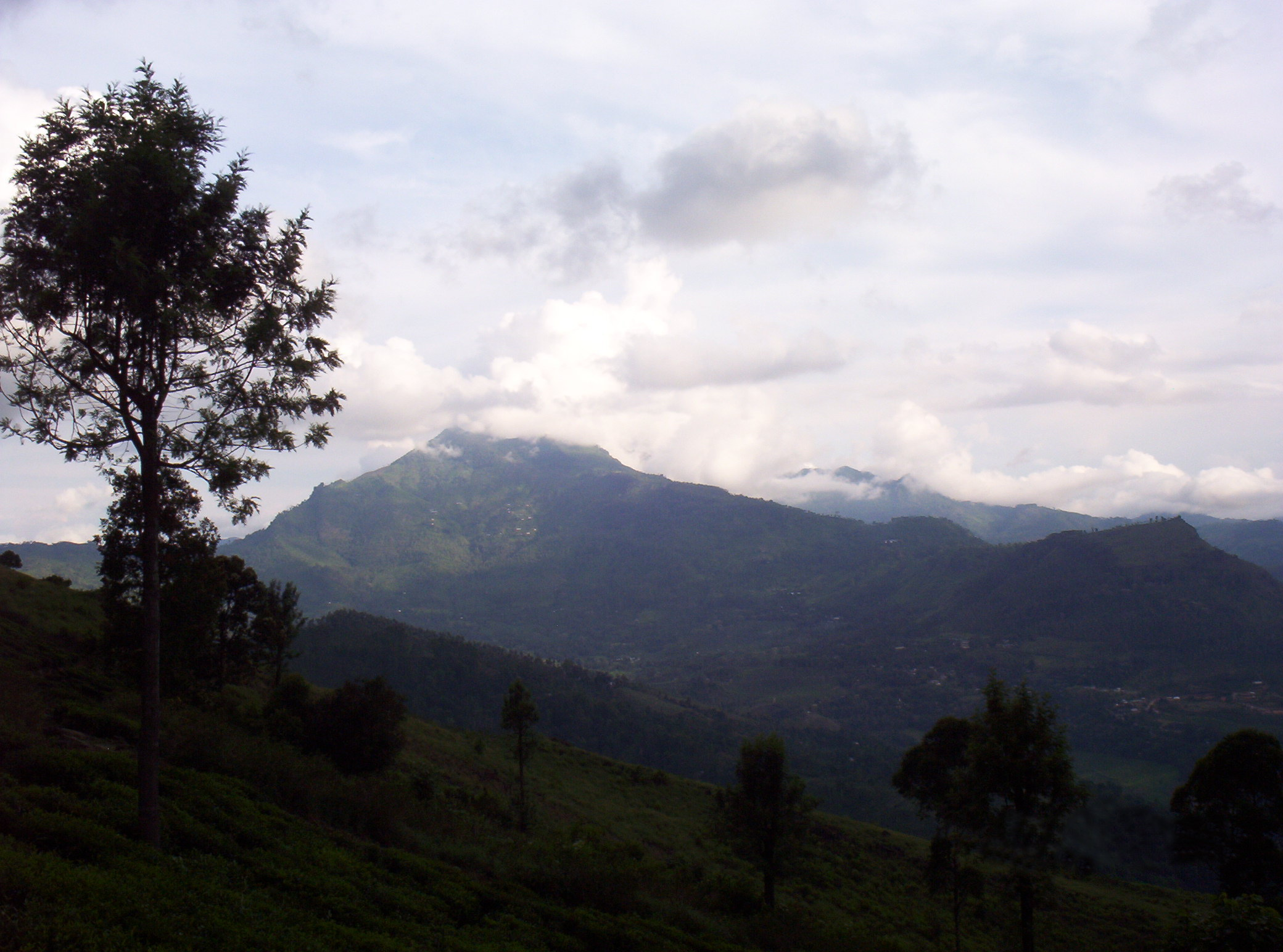
- Namunukula, as seen from Collen Estate in Badulla.

Highest point
- Elevation: 2,036 m (6,680 ft)
- Prominence: 1,012 m (3,320 ft)
- Listing: Ribu
- Coordinates: 6°55′59″N 81°06′49″E

Geography
- Location within Sri Lanka
- Location: Sri Lanka

Namunukula, literally "Nine Peaks" in Sinhala language, is the name of a mountain range in Sri Lanka's province of Uva. Its main peak is 2,036 metres (6,679.8 ft) high. The nearby town is also sometimes called Namunukula Town.

During the Ming treasure voyages of the 15th century, the Chinese fleet led by Admiral Zheng He made use of this geographical feature in their navigation to Sri Lanka, as the mountain is the first visible landmark of Sri Lanka after departing from Sumatra.

== See also ==
- Badulla
