= David J. Gower =

David J. Gower is a palaeontologist.

Before making his debut for the Strongroom CC in 2000, he was a herpetology researcher at the Museum of Natural History in London.

== See also ==
- Category:Taxa named by David J. Gower
