= Gammaduwa =

Gammaduwa ගම්මඩුව கம்மடுவை
- Village
- Location within Sri Lanka
- Coordinates: 7°34′19.4″N 80°42′1.3″E
- Country: Sri Lanka
- Province: Central Province
- Elevation: 2,460 ft (750 m)

Population
  - Total: 5,294
  - Density: 1,380/sq mi (532/km^{2})
- Time zone: UTC+5:00 (Sri Lanka Standard Time)
- Website: 9

Gammaduwa is a village in Sri Lanka. It is located within Matale District, Central Province with a picturesque landscape and temperate climate. It is situated at an elevation of 931 m (3,054 ft) above sea level. The area is mildly densely populated with 532 people per km^{2}. The population of the village, according to the 2018 census, was 5,294. Matale is the nearest city and takes about 1:20 hour by local transportation.

== Local Government Council ==
Gammaduwa is governed by Ambanganga Korale Pradeshiya Sabha.

== Climate ==
April is warmest with an average temperature of 28.4 °C at noon. February is coldest with an average temperature of 15.5 °C at night. Gammaduwa has n307o distinct temperature seasons, the temperature is relatively constant during the year. The temperatures at night are cooler than during daytime. March is on average the month with most sunshine. The wet season has a rainfall peak around September, the dry season is around the month of February.

== See also ==
- List of towns in Central Province, Sri Lanka
