= Edward Frederick Kelaart =

Ceylonese-born physician and naturalist

Lieutenant Colonel Edward Frederick Kelaart (21 November 1819 – 31 August 1860) was a Ceylonese-born medical doctor and naturalist. He made some of the first systematic studies from the region and described many plants and animals from Sri Lanka.

== Biography ==
Edward Frederick (sometimes spelt Fredric) Kelaart was born on 21 November 1819 in Colombo, Sri Lanka. The family was of Dutch and German heritage. He was the oldest son of William Henry Kelaart and Anna Frederika. William worked as an assistant apothecary to the forces. The family had settled in Sri Lanka around 1726. At the age of sixteen, Edward joined the Ceylon government as a medical assistant. In 1838 he went to study at the University of Edinburgh, receiving an MD from the Royal College of Surgeons in 1841.

He returned to Ceylon to become a Staff Assistant Surgeon in the Army in 1841 and was posted in 1843 to Gibraltar as an Army Surgeon. He published Flora Calpensis, the flora of Gibraltar, in 1845. He was elected Fellow of the Linnean Society on 17 February 1846, seconded by J. D. Hooker and Ray Lankester. In 1848, he returned to Ceylon and began making systematic studies. He was also a member of the Geological Society of London, although he did not publish on the topic.

Promoted Staff Surgeon in 1852, he travelled around Sri Lanka and especially studied the highland regions of Nuwara Eliya. He made large collections of reptiles at Nuwara Eliya and sent them to the museum curator-zoologist Edward Blyth.

In 1856 he was made Naturalist to the Government of Ceylon. His first work was to study the pearl fisheries. His taxonomic contributions included the description of 16 species of Turbellaria, 22 species of Actiniaria and 63 species of Nudibranchia. In 1852 he published Prodromus faunae Zeylanicae, on the Ceylonese vertebrate fauna.

Kelaart died aboard the S.S. Ripon on the way to England on 31 August 1860 and was buried at Southampton.

A bust of Kelaart was made by sculptor Henry Weigall.

Two species of birds found in Sri Lanka are named after him: the black-throated munia (Lonchura kelaarti) and the hawk-eagle Nisaetus kelaarti. The Sri Lankan subspecies of jungle nightjar, Caprimulgus indicus kelaarti, also refers to Kelaart. The disused monotypic genus Kelaartia (yellow-eared bulbul) likewise commemorated him. Toad Adenomus kelaartii is also named after him.

== Bibliography ==
- (1846) Flora calpensis; contributions to the botany and topography of Gibraltar, and its neighbourhood.
- (1853) Prodromus Faunæ Zeylanicæ; being Contributions to the Zoology of Ceylon
- (1854) Descriptions of new or little-known species of Reptiles collected in Ceylon. Annals and Magazine of Natural History (2) 13: 25–30.
- (1854) Catalogue of the Reptiles collected in Ceylon. Ann. Mag. Nat. Hist. 13:137-140.
- (1857) Introductory Report on the natural history of the Pearl Oyster of Ceylon
- (1859) Contributions to Marine Zoology; being descriptions of Ceylon Nudibranchiate Molluscs, Sea Anemones and Entozoa, Colombo.
