= Mendis Wickramasinghe =

Sri Lankan herpetologist (born 1976)

L. J. Mendis Wickramasinghe
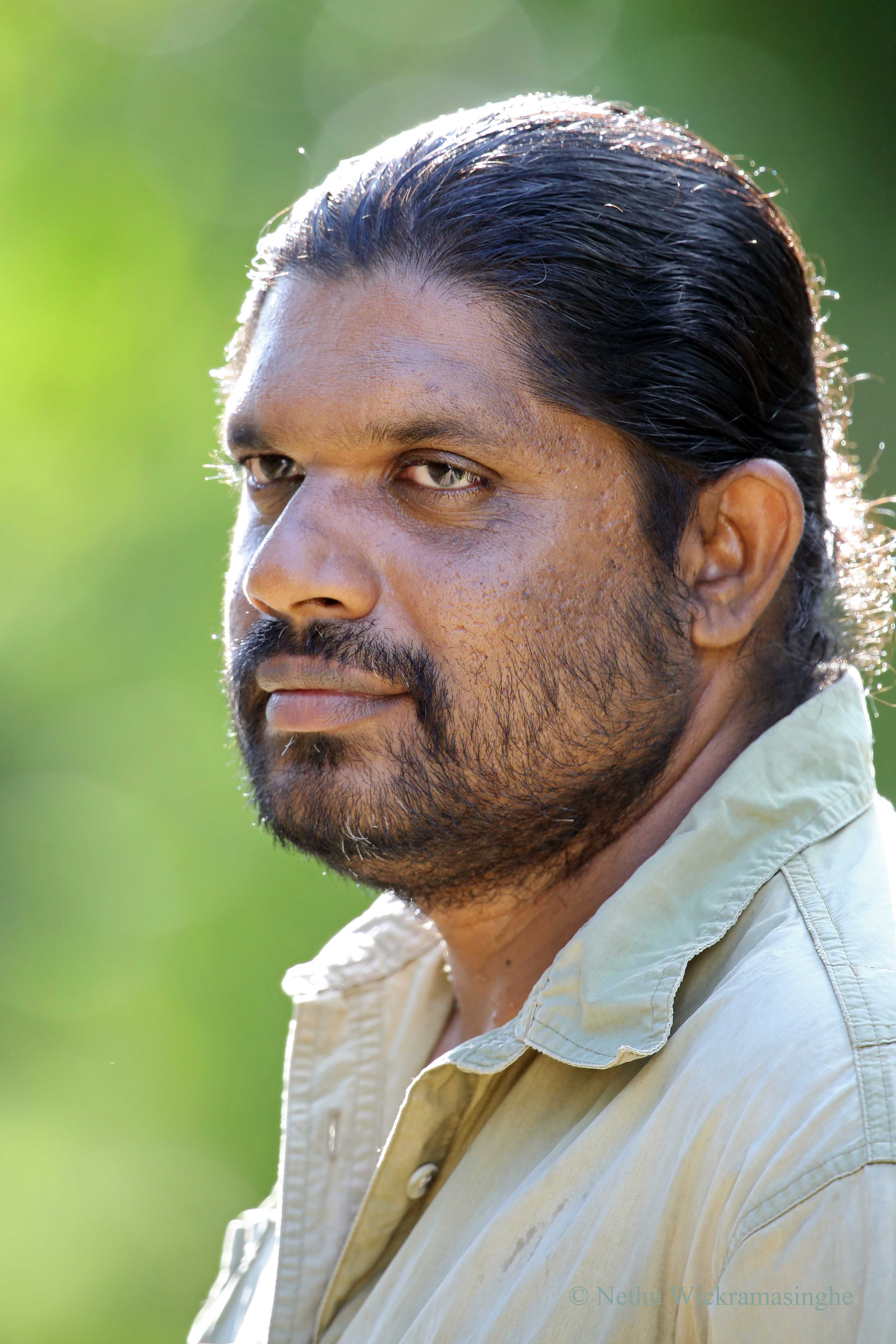
- Born: 6 May 1976 (age 49)
- Occupations: Herpetologist, Wildlife Photographer
- Organization: Herpetological Foundation of Sri Lanka
- Known for: Environmental activism
- Notable work: Repertoire: A pictorial gateway to Sri Lanka's nature
- Spouse: Nethu Wickramasinghe (2007-present)
- Children: 3
- Awards: State Literary Award-2016

L. J. Mendis Wickramasinghe is a Sri Lankan herpetologist, taxonomist, naturalist, and wildlife photographer. Inspired by a childhood passion on snakes and by the diversity of his motherland, he has spent over two decades experiencing the forests across Sri Lanka.

== Biography ==
Wickramasinghe was born in Kalutara, 6 May 1976, and educated in Tissa Central College. He was employed as an Ecologist at the Sri Lanka Program of the International Union for Conservation of Nature (IUCN) for nearly seven years (2000-2007).

Mendis formed the Herpetological Foundation of Sri Lanka (HFS) in year 2007, to further pursue in independent research on the herpetofauna of Sri Lanka, and also provide a platform for young herpetologists to initiate research.

== Professional experience ==
With over 25 years of field research experience on the herpetofauna of Sri Lanka, his work has focused on taxonomic identification and biodiversity assessment of reptiles and amphibians in an effort to increase awareness on the importance of conserving these unique organisms and their habitats in Sri Lanka, as part of our natural heritage.

He has contributed his expertise towards national projects on identification of threatened species in Sri Lanka, in revising the Fauna and Flora Ordinance, and has facilitated the declaration of several protected areas in the country. He is the author of the book titled “Recognizing deadly venomous snakes from harmless snakes in Sri Lanka”.

== Discoveries ==
He is credited with the discovery of over thirty new species (geckos, skinks, snakes and amphibians), also re-discovering several species of amphibians believed to have been extinct.

== Photography ==
He began engaging in wildlife photography in a much later stage in his life while initially engaged in photography for scientific purposes, finally finding abode in the art of wildlife photography. Intrinsically motivated to capture the beauty led by an overwhelming passion to express the most artistically composed image in what he sees, he seeks to share his experiences with those that admire the natural world and to protect the hidden spectacles of the wilderness for the future generations.

“Repertoire: A pictorial gateway to Sri Lanka’s nature” marked his debut publication as a photographer. His wildlife images have been awarded both nationally and internationally. He currently contributes his knowledge as a wildlife photography lecturer and a national and international competition judge, while being the main course instructor in Wildlife photography at the Institute of Multimedia Education (IME).
