= List of snakes of South Asia (Colubridae) =

The following is a list of colubrid snakes of South Asia, primarily covering the region covered by mainland India, Pakistan, Nepal, Sri Lanka, Bangladesh, Bhutan, parts of Myanmar and the Andaman and Nicobar Island chains. This forms part of the complete list of snakes of South Asia.

== Family Colubridae ==
- Gunther's vine snake Ahaetulla dispar Southwest India
- Green vine snake Ahaetulla nasuta India, Sri Lanka, Nepal, Bangladesh, Myanmar, Thailand, Indo-China
- Oriental green snake Ahaetulla prasina Eastern India, Bangladesh, Bhutan, Myanmar, Indo-China, Malay region
- Brown vine snake Ahaetulla pulverulenta Southwest India, Sri Lanka
- Ahaetulla laudankia, peninsular India
- Boulenger's keelback Amphiesma parallelum India, Nepal, Myanmar, China, Indo-China
- Eastern striped keelback Amphiesma platyceps India (Kashmir, Northeast), Nepal
- Buff-striped keelback Amphiesma stolatum Pakistan, India, Sri Lanka, Nepal, Bhutan, Bangladesh, China, Indo-China
- Amphiesma khasiense
- Hill Keelback Amphiesma monticola India
- Amphiesma nicobariense
- Amphiesma pealii
- Amphiesma xenura
- Amphiesma modestum
- Amphiesma sieboldii
- Banded racer Argyrogena fasciolata Pakistan, India, Nepal, Bangladesh
- Boie's rough-sided snake Aspidura brachyorrhos Sri Lanka
- Cope's rough-sided snake Aspidura copei Sri Lanka
- Deraniyagala's rough-sided snake Aspidura deraniyagalae Sri Lanka
- Drummond-Hay's rough-sided snake Aspidura drummondhayi Sri Lanka
- Gunther's rough-sided snake Aspidura guentheri Sri Lanka
- Common rough-sided snake Aspidura trachyprocta Sri Lanka
- Olive keelback water snake Atretium schistosum India, Bangladesh, Nepal, Sri Lanka
- Sri Lanka blossom krait Balanophis ceylonensis Sri Lanka
- Iridescent snake Blythia reticulata Northeast India, China, Myanmar
- Barnes' cat snake Boiga barnesii Sri Lanka
- Sri Lankan cat snake Boiga ceylonensis India, Nepal, Sri Lanka
- Green cat snake Boiga cyanea India, Nepal, Bangladesh, Myanmar, Thailand, Indo-China
- Forsten's cat snake Boiga forsteni India, Nepal, Sri Lanka
- Many-spotted cat snake Boiga multomaculata Bangladesh, Myanmar, Thailand, Indo-China, China
- Orange cat snake Boiga ochracea East and Northeast India, Myanmar
- Common cat snake Boiga trigonata Central Asia, Pakistan, India, Nepal, Bangladesh, Sri Lanka
- Nicobarese cat snake Boiga wallachi India (Nicobars)
- Boiga multifasciata
- Boiga quincunciata
- Boiga ocellata
- Boiga nuchalis
- Boiga gokool
- Boiga dightoni
- Boiga dendrophila
- Boiga cynodon
- Boiga beddomei
- Boiga andamanensis
- Collared Reed Snake Calamaria pavimentata
- Cantor's Water Snake Cantoria violacea
- Dog-faced water snake Cerberus rynchops Pakistan, India, Sri Lanka, Indo-China, Malay region
- Sri Lankan wolf snake Cercaspis carinatus Sri Lanka
- Ornate flying snake Chrysopelea ornata Uzbekistan, Afghanistan, Iran, Pakistan, India
- Sri Lankan flying snake Chrysopelea taprobanica Southwest India, Sri Lanka
- Paradise flying snake Chrysopelea paradisi
- Glossy-bellied racer Coluber ventromaculatus India, Sri Lanka
- Coluber rhodorachis
- Coluber karelini
- Coluber gracilis
- Coluber bholanathi
- Coluber vittacaudatus
- Indian Smooth Snake Coronella brachyura
- Boulenger's bronzebacked tree snake Dendrelaphis bifrenalis Sri Lanka
- Schokar's Bronzeback tree snake Dendrelaphis schokari, Sri Lanka
- Dendrelaphis girii India
- Stripe-tailed bronzebacked tree snake Dendrelaphis caudolineatus India, Sri Lanka
- Blue bronzebacked tree snake Dendrelaphis cyanochloris India, Bangladesh, Myanmar, Thailand
- Painted bronzebacked tree snake Dendrelaphis pictus Nepal, India, Bangladesh, Myanmar, Thailand, China, Malay region
- Common bronzebacked tree snake Dendrelaphis tristis Pakistan, India, Nepal, Bangladesh, Sri Lanka
- Dendrelaphis humayuni
- Dendrelaphis grandoculis
- Dendrelaphis gorei
- Dussumier's mud snake Dieurostus dussumieri
- Indian egg-eating snake Elachistodon westermanni India, Nepal, Bangladesh
- Yellow-striped trinket snake Elaphe flavolineata India (Andamans), Malay region
- Common trinket snake Elaphe helena Pakistan, India, Nepal, Bangladesh, Sri Lanka
- Himalayan trinket snake Elaphe hodgsonii India (Himalayas), Nepal
- Elaphe mandarina
- Elaphe porphyracea
- Elaphe prasina
- Copperhead trinket snake Elaphe radiata India, Bangladesh, Nepal, Myanmar, Indo-China, China
- Elaphe taeniura
- Common smooth water snake Enhydris enhydris Nepal, India, Bangladesh, Myanmar, Thailand, Indo-China, Malay region
- Rice Paddy Snake Enhydris plumbea
- Siebold's Water Snake Enhydris sieboldii
- Crab-eating Water Snake Fordonia leucobalia
- Cat-eyed fishing snake Gerardia prevostiana Pakistan, India, Sri Lanka, Myanmar, Malay region
- Gongylosoma nicobariensis
- Gonyosoma cantoris
- Gonyosoma frenatum
- Red-tailed Green Ratsnake Gonyosoma oxycephalum
- Black-spined snake Haplocercus ceylonensis Sri Lanka
- Lesser stripe-necked snake Liopeltis calamaria Bangladesh, India, Sri Lanka
- Liopeltis rappi
- Liopeltis stoliczkae
- Spotted Whip Snake Hemorrhois ravergieri
- Puff-faced Water Snake Homalopsis buccata
- Günther's Reed Snake Liopeltis frenatus
- Gunther's bridal snake Lycodo gracilis India, Sri Lanka, False Island (off the Arakan coast of Myanmar)
- Vellore bridal snake Lycodo nympha India, Sri Lanka
- Gammie's wolf snake Lycodon gammiei
- White-banded wolf snake Lycodon septentrionalis
- Banded Wolf Snake Lycodon fasciatus
- Yellow-spotted Wolf Snake Lycodon flavomaculatus
- Laotian Wolf Snake Lycodon laoensis
- Mackinnon's Wolf Snake Lycodon mackinnoni
- Andaman Wolf Snake Lycodon tiwarii
- Zaw's Wolf Snake Lycodon zawi
- Common wolf snake Lycodon aulicus Pakistan, India, Maldives, Nepal, Bangladesh, Sri Lanka, Myanmar
- Andamanese wolf snake Lycodon capucinus India, Myanmar, Thailand, Indo-China, China, Hong Kong
- Yellow-speckled wolf snake Lycodon jara Nepal, India, Bangladesh
- Shaw's wolf snake Lycodon striatus Transcapsia, Afghanistan, Pakistan, India, Sri Lanka
- Travancore wolf snake Lycodon travancoricus India
- Sind Longnose Sand Snake Lytorhynchus paradoxus
- Green Keelback Macropisthodon plumbicolor Pakistan, India, Bangladesh, Sri Lanka
- Theobald's Kukri Snake Oligodon theobaldi
- Kukri Snake Oligodon affinis
- White-striped kukri snake Oligodon albocinctus India, Bangladesh, Myanmar
- Common kukri snake Oligodon arnensis Pakistan, India, Nepal, Bangladesh, Sri Lanka
- Templeton's kukri snake Oligodon calamarius Sri Lanka
- Cantor's kukri snake Oligodon cyclurus Bangladesh, Eastern India
- Spot-tailed kukri snake Oligodon dorsalis India, Bangladesh, Myanmar
- Half-lined kukri snake Oligodon sublineatus Sri Lanka
- Variegated kukri snake Oligodon taeniolatus Pakistan, India, Bangladesh, Sri Lanka
- Black-spotted kukri snake Oligodon venustus India
- Nagarkot Kukri Snake Oligodon erythrogaster
- Günther's Kukri Snake Oligodon cinereus
- Assam Kukri Snake Oligodon catenata
- Shorthead Kukri Snake Oligodon brevicauda
- Abor Hills Kukri Snake Oligodon melanozonatus
- Nikhil's Kukri Snake Oligodon nikhili
- Oligodon woodmasoni
- Namsang Kukri Snake Oligodon erythrorhachis
- Walnut Kukri Snake Oligodon juglandifer
- Bluebelly Kukri Snake Oligodon melaneus
- Oligodon templetoni
- Assam snail-eater Pareas monticola Bangladesh, India (Himalayan foothills)
- Mock viper Psammodynastes pulverulentus India, Myanmar, Thailand, Indo-China, China, Malay region
- Painted Mock Viper Psammodynastes pictus
- Condanarus sand snake Psammophis condanarus Pakistan, India, Nepal
- Leith's sand snake Psammophis leithii Pakistan, India
- Desert sand snake Psammophis schokari Pakistan, India
- Long Sand Racer Psammophis longifrons
- Doria's Green Snake Ptyas doriae
- Indo-Chinese rat snake Ptyas korros India, China, Myanmar, Malay region
- Indian rat snake Ptyas mucosa Turkestan, Afghanistan, Pakistan, India, Nepal, Bangladesh, Sri Lanka, Myanmar, China, Taiwan, Sumatra, Java
- Black-margined rat snake Ptyas nigromarginata India, China, Myanmar
- False cobra Pseudoxenodon macrops Bhutan, India, Nepal (Himalayan foothills)
- Brown Trapezoid Snake Rhabdops bicolor
- Olive Trapezoid Snake Rhabdops olivaceus
- Rhabdops aquaticus
- Himalayan keelback Rhabdophis himalayanus India, Bangladesh, Bhutan, Nepal, Myanmar
- Red-necked keelback Rhabdophis subminiatus Nepal, India, Bangladesh, Myanmar, Thailand, China, Indo-China, Malay region
- Günther's Many-tooth Snake Sibynophis bistrigatus
- Common Many-tooth Snake Sibynophis collaris
- Cantor's blackheaded snake Sibynophis sagittarius Nepal, India, Bangladesh
- Spotted blackheaded snake Sibynophis subpunctatus India, Sri Lanka
- Olive Keelback Sinonatrix percarinata
- Red-spotted snake Spalerosophis arenarius India, Pakistan
- Royal snake Spalerosophis diadema Turkestan, Iran, Afghanistan, Pakistan, India
- Khasi Red Snake Stoliczkia khasiensis
- Blackbelly Worm-eating Snake Trachischium fuscum
- Rosebelly Worm-eating Snake Trachischium guentheri
- Olive Oriental Slender Snake Trachischium laeve
- Mountain Worm-eating Snake Trachischium monticola
- Yellow-bellied Worm-eating Snake Trachischium tenuiceps
- Wallaceophis gujaratensis
- Sri Lankan checkered keelback Xenochrophis asperrimus Sri Lanka
- Dark-bellied marsh snake Xenochrophis cerasogaster Pakistan, India, Nepal, Bangladesh
- Andamanese keelback water snake Xenochrophis melanzostus India (Andamans)
- Checkered Keelback Xenochrophis piscator Pakistan, India, Nepal, Bhutan, Bangladesh, Sri Lanka, Myanmar, China, Indo-China
- Yellow-Spotted Keelback Xenochrophis flavipunctatus
- Xenochrophis punctulatus
- St. John's Keelback Xenochrophis sanctijohannis
- Triangle Keelback Xenochrophis trianguligerus
- Perrotet's Mountain Snake Xylophis perroteti
- Günther's Mountain Snake Xylophis stenorhynchus
- Captain's Wood Snake Xylophis captaini
