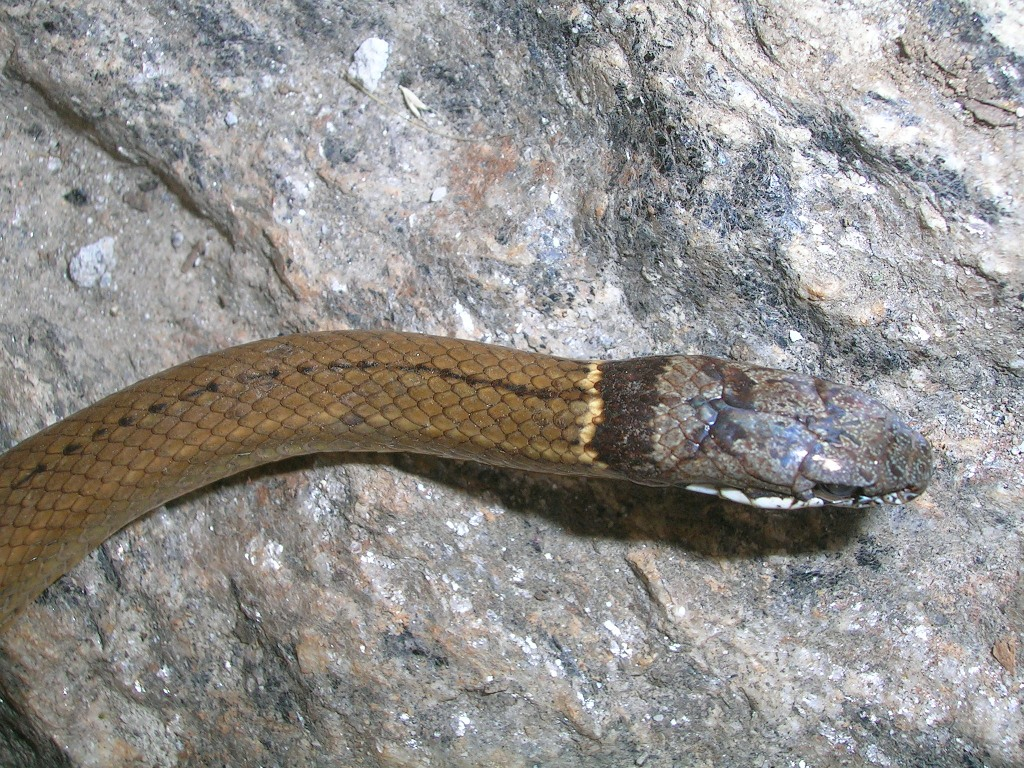
- Sibynophis collaris

Scientific classification
- Kingdom: Animalia
- Phylum: Chordata
- Class: Reptilia
- Order: Squamata
- Suborder: Serpentes
- Family: Colubridae
- Subfamily: Sibynophiinae
- Genus: Sibynophis; Fitzinger, 1843

Species
- see text

= Sibynophis =

Genus of snakes

Sibynophis is a genus of nonvenomous colubrid snakes, commonly called many-toothed snakes, which, together with Scaphiodontophis, make up the subfamily Sibynophiinae.

== Species ==
The following nine species are recognized.

- Sibynophis bistrigatus (Günther, 1868) – Günther's many-toothed snake
- Sibynophis bivittatus (Boulenger, 1894) – white-striped snake
- Sibynophis chinensis (Günther, 1889) – Chinese many-toothed snake
- Sibynophis collaris (Gray, 1853) – common many-toothed snake
- Sibynophis geminatus (H. Boie, 1826) – Boie's many-toothed snake
- Sibynophis melanocephalus (Gray, 1835) – black-headed collared snake, Malayan many-toothed snake
- Sibynophis sagittarius (Cantor, 1839) – Cantor's black-headed snake
- Sibynophis subpunctatus (A.M.C. Duméril, Bibron & A. Duméril, 1854) – Duméril's black-headed snake, Jerdon's many-toothed snake
- Sibynophis triangularis Taylor, 1965 – triangle many-tooth snake, triangulate collared snake
