= Ringneck =

Ringneck may refer to:

- Australian ringneck, a parrot native to Australia
- Barbary dove or Ringneck dove, a domesticated dove species
- Diadophis punctatus or ringneck snake, found in North America
- Indian ringneck, a parrot native to India
- Liopeltis, a genus of snakes that includes the Malayan ringneck (L. tricolor)
- Ringneck pheasant, a bird found in Eurasia and North America
- Rose-ringed parakeet, a parakeet commonly kept as a pet
