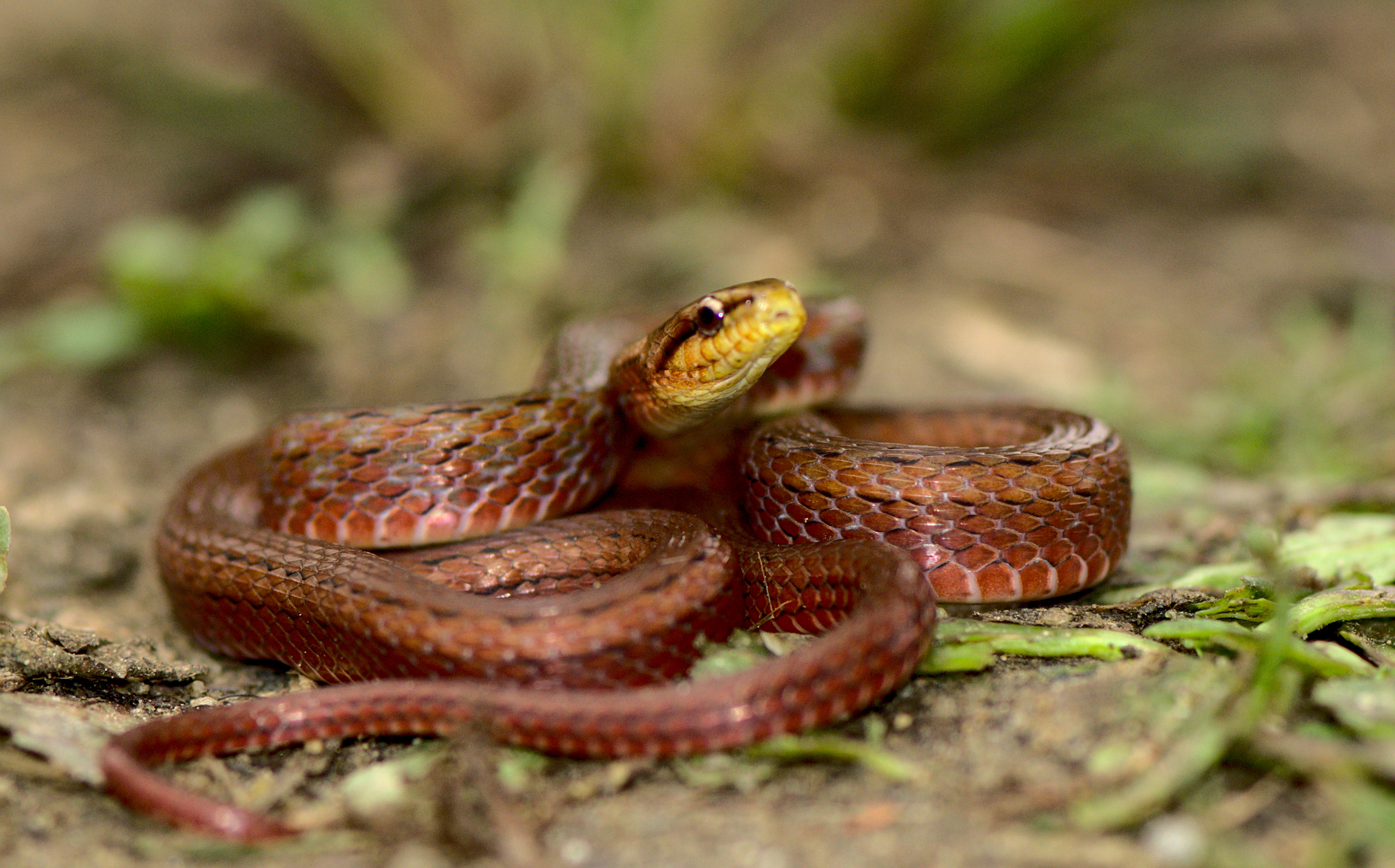
- Herpetoreas sieboldii

Scientific classification
- Kingdom: Animalia
- Phylum: Chordata
- Class: Reptilia
- Order: Squamata
- Suborder: Serpentes
- Family: Colubridae
- Subfamily: Natricinae
- Genus: Herpetoreas; Günther, 1860

= Herpetoreas =

Genus of snakes

Herpetoreas is a genus of snakes in the subfamily Natricinae of the family Colubridae. The genus is endemic to South Asia.

== Species ==
The genus Herpetoreas contains the following ten species, which are recognized as being valid.

- Herpetoreas abros S. Liu, Hou, Zhou, Zuo, Yin & Rao, 2024
- Herpetoreas burbrinki Guo, Zhu, Q. Liu, L. Zhang, J.X. Li, Y. Huang & Pyron, 2014 – Burbrink's keelback
- Herpetoreas davidi T.V. Nguyen, Lalremsanga, Biakzuala & G. Vogel, 2024
- Herpetoreas murlen Lalremsanga, Bal, G. Vogel & Biakzuala, 2022 – Murlen keelback
- Herpetoreas pealii (Sclater, 1891) – Assam keelback, Peal’s keelback, bark brown keelback
- Herpetoreas platyceps (Blyth, 1854) – Himalayan keelback
- Herpetoreas sieboldii Günther, 1860 – Siebold's keelback, Sikkim keelback
- Herpetoreas tpser Ren, Jiang, J. Huang, David & J.-T. Li, 2022
- Herpetoreas xenura (Wall, 1907) – Wall's keelback
- Herpetoreas yadongensis Tan, K. Li, Zhao, H. Zhang, Guo & Lyu, 2026

Nota bene: A binomial authority in parentheses indicates that the species was originally described in a genus other than Herpetoreas.

== Etymology ==
The specific name, burbrinki, is in honor of American herpetologist Frank T. Burbrink.
