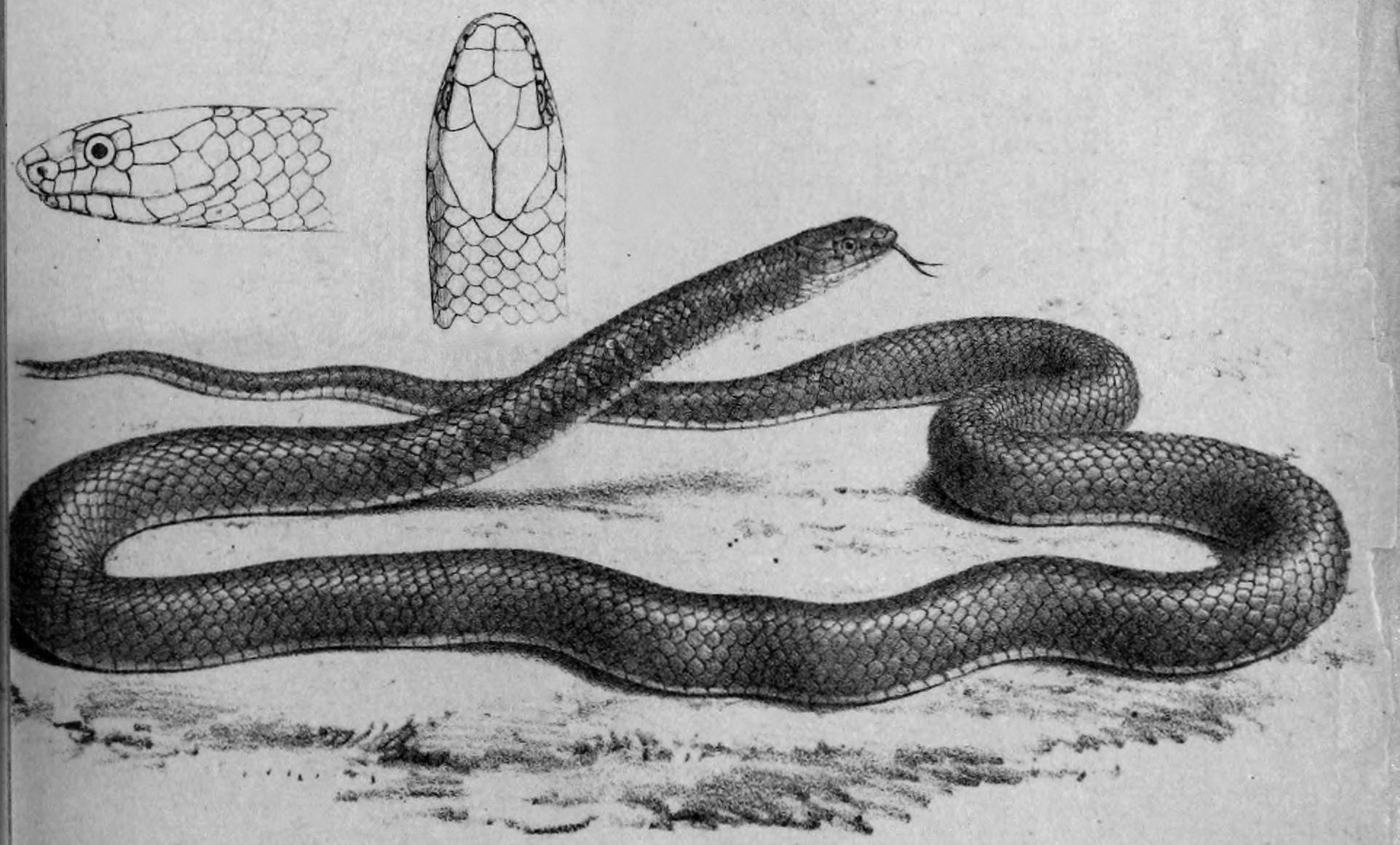
- Liopeltis rappi

Scientific classification
- Domain: Eukaryota
- Kingdom: Animalia
- Phylum: Chordata
- Class: Reptilia
- Order: Squamata
- Suborder: Serpentes
- Family: Colubridae
- Subfamily: Colubrinae
- Genus: Liopeltis; Fitzinger, 1843

Species
- Liopeltis calamaria Liopeltis frenata Liopeltis pallidonuchalis Liopeltis philippina Liopeltis rappi Liopeltis stoliczkae Liopeltis tiomanica Liopeltis tricolor

= Liopeltis =

Genus of snakes

Liopeltis is a genus of colubrid snakes. With species known from India and Southeast Asia.

== Species ==
- L. calamaria (Günther, 1858)) – calamaria reed snake
- L. frenata (Günther, 1858)) – Günther's reed snake
- L. pallidonuchalis Poyarkov, Nguyen, & Vogel, 2019) – pale-necked ringneck
- L. philippina (Boettger, 1897) – Philippine liopeltine snake
- L. rappi (Günther, 1860)) – Himalayan stripe-necked snake
- L. stoliczkae (Sclater, 1891)
- L. tiomanica Som, Grismer, Grismer, Wood, Quah, Brown, Diesmos, Weinell, & Stuart, 2020
- L. tricolor (Schlegel, 1837) – Malayan ringneck, tricoloured ringneck

== Geographic range ==
India and Southeast Asia.
