= Arthur Stark =

British ornithologist (1846–1899)

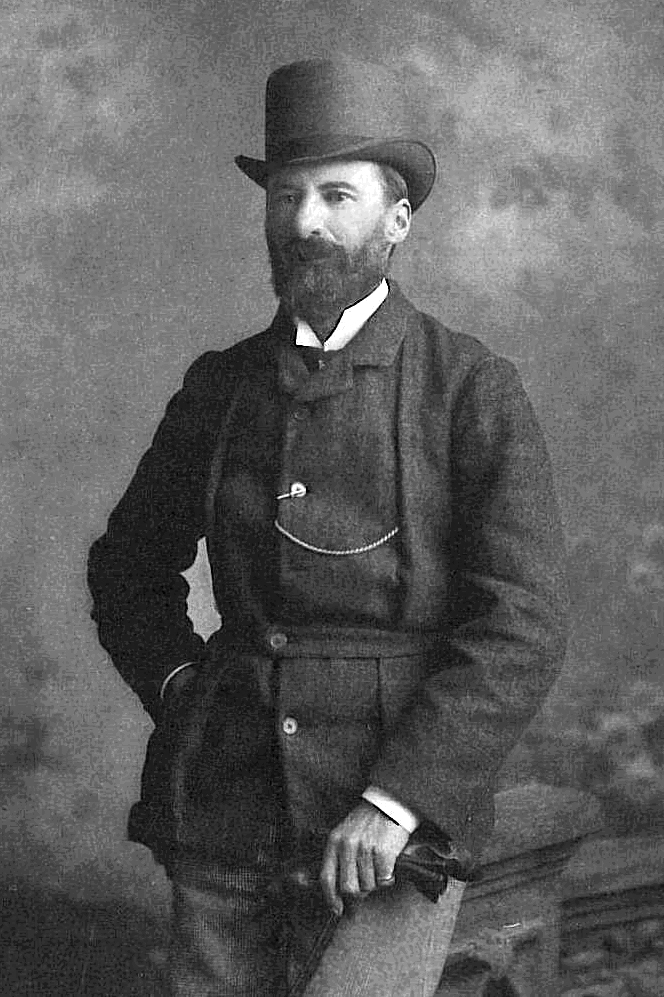
- Arthur C. Stark, c. 1885
- Born: Arthur Cowell Stark; 27 November 1846; Torquay
- Died: 18 November 1899 (aged 53); Ladysmith
- Resting place: Ladysmith
- Education: Blundell's School
- Alma mater: University of Edinburgh
- Known for: study of the birds of South Africa
- Spouse: Rosa Catherine Cox

Arthur Cowell Stark (27 November 1846 – 18 November 1899) was an English medical doctor and naturalist. He emigrated from Torquay, England to Cape Town, South Africa in 1892. He lived in (the British colonies of) South Africa during the last 7 years of his life and died during the Siege of Ladysmith at the age of 53. He is best known for initiating an ornithological work, The Birds of South Africa.

== Early life ==
Arthur Stark was born in Torquay as the eldest of three sons of Anne and John Stark. His father was a successful ironmonger, and at times a furniture manufacturer. Stark was educated at Blundell's School and Clifton College. When his father died in 1863, Stark, then aged 16, took on the responsibility for the family business. He worked as ironmonger until he was 26, when he married his distant cousin Rosa Cox. For a time the couple lived in Weston-super-Mare, before they moved to Edinburgh where Stark, then aged 30, began his medical studies at the University of Edinburgh.

== South African work ==
After the death of his wife Rosa in 1892, he settled in Cape Town, while his daughters remained in England. Besides practicing as medical doctor he travelled regularly to collect animal specimens for the South African Museum and made sketches and extensive notes of his observations.

His travels up to 1898 included excursions into the inland regions of the Cape, Natal, Orange Free State and Transvaal, while he consulted the major specimen collections of the time, at the South African Museum, Albany Museum in Grahamstown and the Durban Museum. Besides his personal notes, he accumulated bird eggs, bird nests and butterfly specimens, some of which were added to his personal collection.

He moved from Cape Town to Durban shortly before the outbreak of the Boer War and travelled to England in 1899 to oversee the printing of the first volume of his ornithological work, The Birds of South Africa. The completed series was meant to form part of a wider project under the editorship of William Sclater, director of the South African Museum, describing the fauna of southern Africa. Stark returned to the Colony of Natal in September 1899, where he volunteered as medical officer for the British forces when the Boer War broke out.

== Death at Ladysmith ==
During the siege of Ladysmith he was resident in the Royal Hotel, but spent the days in shell-proof dugouts along the Klip River, or fishing, while the town was being shelled by Boer forces. Stark had just returned and was standing on the hotel's veranda on the evening of 18 November 1899, when at 19:30 the Long Tom cannon stationed on Pepworth Hill fired two shots at the hotel. These were aimed at important persons who may have assembled there, probably Leander Starr Jameson, Prime Minister of the Cape Colony, and Colonel Francis Rhodes who were known to be in town.

Stark's legs were seriously injured by the second shell and he died shortly afterwards while undergoing surgery. Stark was buried in Ladysmith. H.W. Nevinson who was present at his burial records the irony of him being a strong opponent of the Chamberlain policy, and a vigorous denouncer of the war's injustice.

== Completion of project ==
Stark's field notes were afterwards recovered from Ladysmith and his Durban home. His executors entrusted these to William Sclater, director of the South African Museum, to be prepared for the second volume of The Birds of South Africa. This volume appeared in 1902 as part of Sclater's series The Fauna of South Africa.

William Sclater named Laniarius starki for him in 1901, and Captain George Shelley followed by naming Stark's lark, Spizocorys starki, in Stark's honour in 1902. William Sclater, Stark's co-author of The Birds of South Africa, died in 1944 from injuries sustained from a V-1 flying bomb dropped in London.

== External reference ==
- The Birds of South Africa (1900), Volume 1 at the Internet Archive
