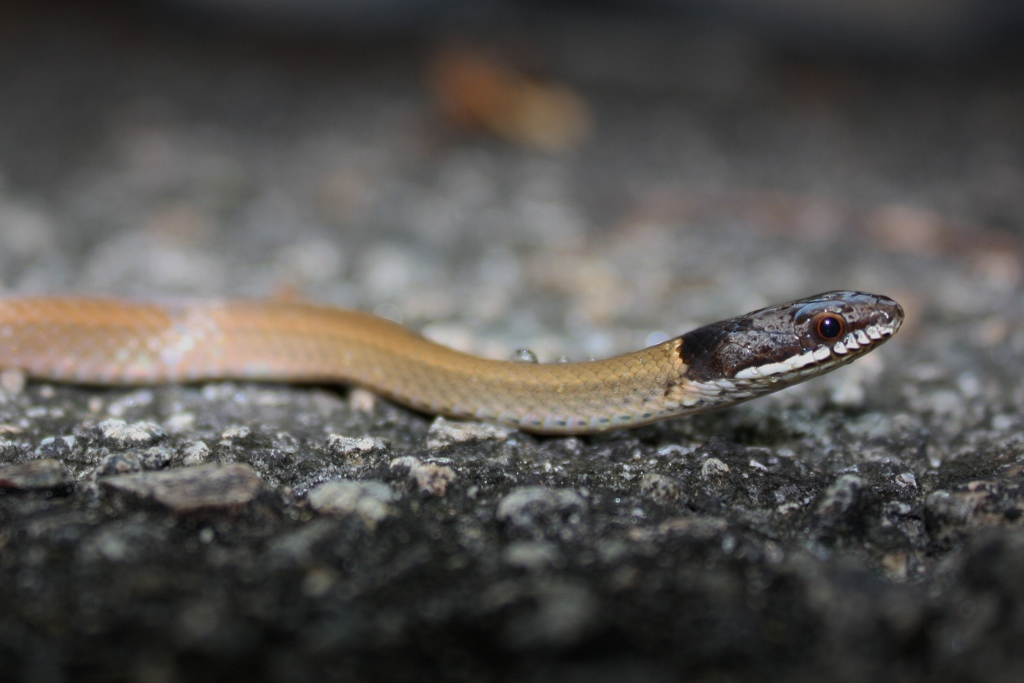

Conservation status
- Least Concern (IUCN 3.1)

Scientific classification
- Kingdom: Animalia
- Phylum: Chordata
- Class: Reptilia
- Order: Squamata
- Suborder: Serpentes
- Family: Colubridae
- Genus: Sibynophis
- Species: S. chinensis

Binomial name
- Sibynophis chinensis (Günther, 1889)

= Sibynophis chinensis =

Species of snake

Sibynophis chinensis, commonly known as the Chinese many-toothed snake, is a nonvenomous species of colubrid snake found in Vietnam, Laos, China, Taiwan and South Korea.
