= Herpetoreas burbrinki =

Conservation status
- Data Deficient (IUCN 3.1)

Scientific classification
- Kingdom: Animalia
- Phylum: Chordata
- Class: Reptilia
- Order: Squamata
- Suborder: Serpentes
- Family: Colubridae
- Genus: Herpetoreas
- Species: H. burbrinki

Binomial name
- Herpetoreas burbrinki Guo, Zhu, Liu, Zhang, Li, Huang & Pyron, 2014

Species of snake

Herpetoreas burbrinki, also known commonly as Burbrink's keelback, is a species of snake in the subfamily Natricinae of the family Colubridae. The species is endemic to the Tibet Autonomous Region (Xizang) of China.

== Etymology ==
The specific name, burbrinki, is in honor of American herpetologist Frank T. Burbrink.

== Description ==
The dorsal scales of Herpetoreas burbrinki are strongly keeled. They are arranged in 19 rows on the neck, 19 rows at midbody, and 19 rows posteriorly. The male holotype has 172 ventrals and 96 divided (paired) subcaudals.

== Habitat ==
The preferred natural habitat of Herpetoreas burbrinki is forest, at elevations of 1,800–2,000 m (5,900–6,600 ft).

== Behavior ==
Herpetoreas burbrinki is terrestrial.

== Reproduction ==
The mode of reproduction of Herpetodryas burbrinki is unknown.
