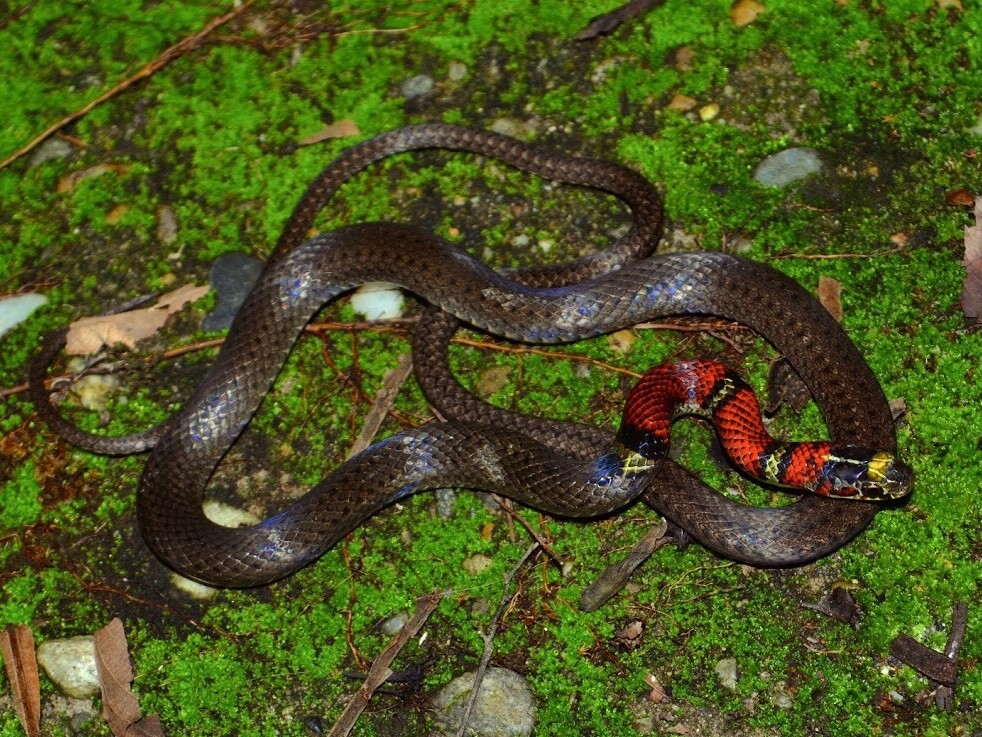

Conservation status
- Least Concern (IUCN 3.1)

Scientific classification
- Kingdom: Animalia
- Phylum: Chordata
- Class: Reptilia
- Order: Squamata
- Suborder: Serpentes
- Family: Colubridae
- Genus: Scaphiodontophis
- Species: S. annulatus

Binomial name
- Scaphiodontophis annulatus (A.M.C. Duméril, Bibron & A.H.A. Duméril, 1854)

Synonyms
- List: Enicognathus annulatus A.M.C. Duméril, Bibron & A.H.A. Duméril, 1854; Diadophis annulatus — Garman, 1884; Polyodontophis annulatus — Boulenger, 1893; Henicognathus venustissimus — Günther, 1895; Sibynophis zeteki Dunn, 1930; Sibinophis annulatus — Ditmars, 1934; Scaphiodontophis carpicinctus Taylor & H.M. Smith, 1943; Scaphiodontophis zeteki — Taylor & H.M. Smith, 1943; Scaphiodontophis cyclurus — Taylor & H.M. Smith, 1943; Scaphiodontophis nothus — Taylor & H.M. Smith, 1943; Scaphiodontophis albonuchalis — Taylor & H.M. Smith, 1943; Scaphiodontophis annulatus — J. Peters & Orejas-Miranda, 1970

= Scaphiodontophis annulatus =

Species of snake

Scaphiodontophis annulatus, commonly known as the Guatemala neckband snake, is a species of snake in the family Colubridae. The species is native to southern Mexico, Central America, and Colombia. There are four recognized subspecies.

== Taxonomy ==
The following four subspecies are recognized as being valid. The subspecific name, dugandi, is in honor of Colombian biologist Armando Dugand.

- Scaphiodontophis annulatus annulatus (A.M.C. Duméril, Bibron & A.H.A. Duméril, 1854)
- Scaphiodontophis annulatus dugandi Roze, 1969
- Scaphiodontophis annulatus hondurensis (Schmidt, 1936)
- Scaphiodontophis annulatus nothus Taylor & H.M. Smith, 1943

== Distribution and habitat ==
S. annulatus is found in Mexico, Belize, Colombia, El Salvador, Guatemala, Honduras, and Nicaragua.

The preferred natural habitat of S. annulatus is forest at altitudes from sea level to 1,200 m (3,900 ft).

== Reproduction ==
S. annulatus is oviparous.
