= Liopeltis philippina =

Conservation status
- Least Concern (IUCN 3.1)

Scientific classification
- Kingdom: Animalia
- Phylum: Chordata
- Class: Reptilia
- Order: Squamata
- Suborder: Serpentes
- Family: Colubridae
- Genus: Liopeltis
- Species: L. philippina

Binomial name
- Liopeltis philippina (Boettger, 1897)

Species of snake

Liopeltis philippina, commonly known as the Philippine liopeltine snake, is a species of nonvenomous snake in the family Colubridae. It is found in the Philippines.
