= Robert Templeton =

English naturalist and entomologist (1802-1892)

Robert Templeton (12 December 1802 – 2 June 1892) was an Irish naturalist, artist, and entomologist. He qualified as an army surgeon and travelled through Europe and Asia, collecting and drawing butterflies and publishing several papers on the subject.

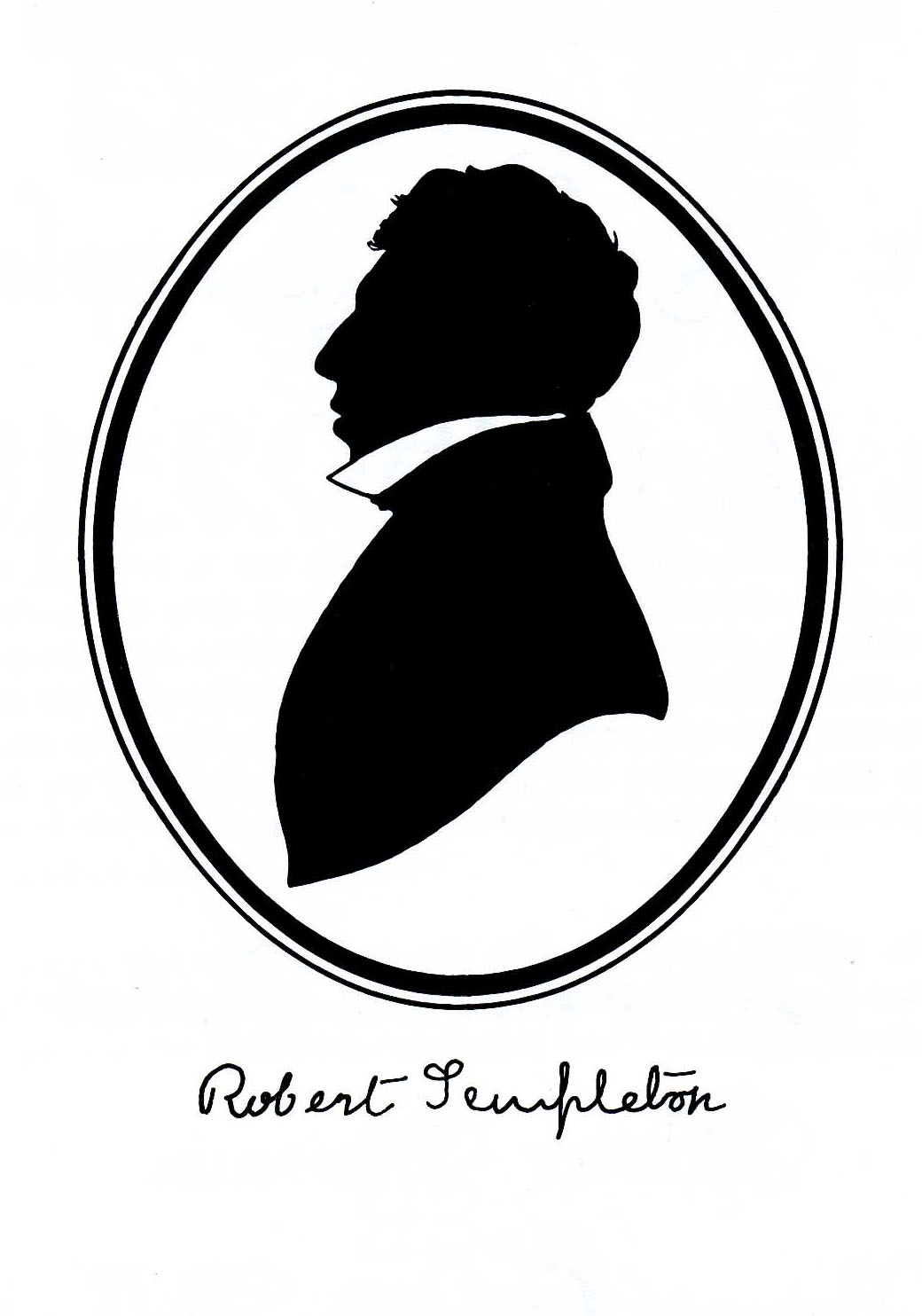
Silhouette of Robert Templeton

== Life and work ==
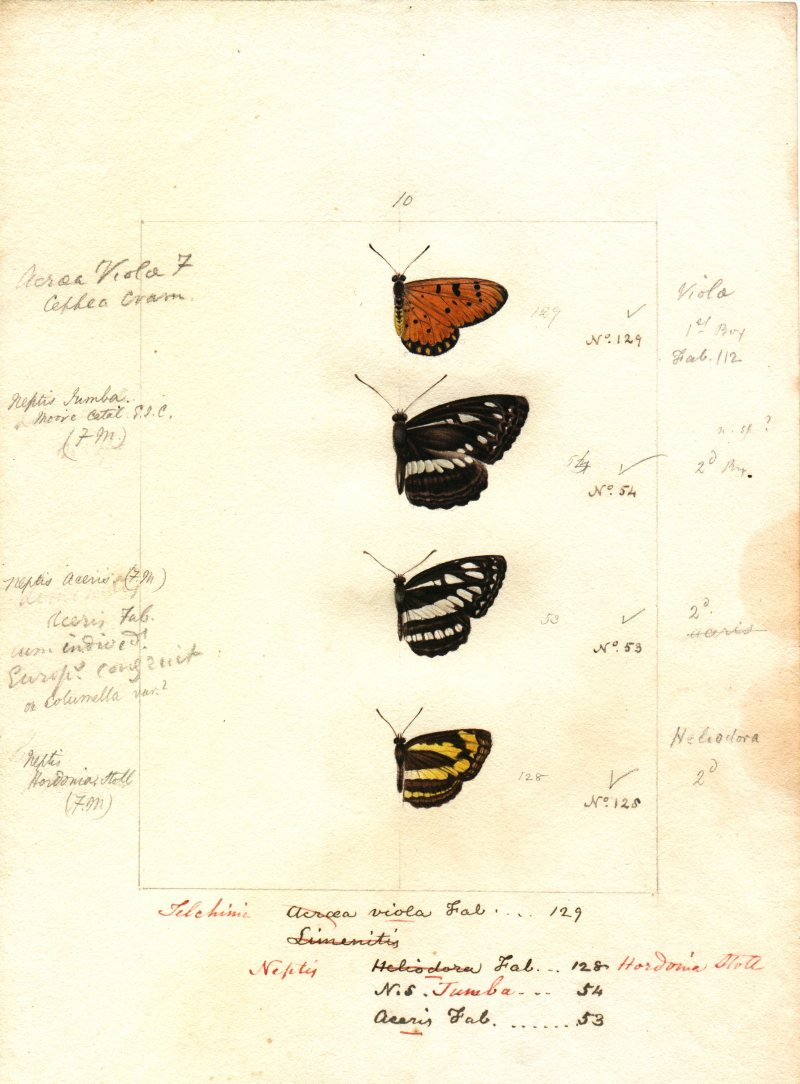
A watercolour plate by Robert Templeton illustrating Sri Lankan butterflies

Robert Templeton was the son of the botanist John Templeton. He was born at Cranmore House, Belfast. Under his father’s influence, he gained a love of nature, and started collecting specimens as a boy.

He was educated in the Belfast Academical Institution, which his father co-founded. In 1821 he left Ireland for Edinburgh, Scotland to study medicine. Following graduation, he practised in the university hospital. In the same year he became a Member of the Belfast Natural History Society. In 1833, on 6 May, he was commissioned as Assistant Surgeon in the Royal Artillery, initially stationed at the Royal Artillery Barracks, Woolwich, close to London, England.

In 1834, Templeton was stationed to Mauritius and in 1835 to Rio de Janeiro and Recife. From Rio (1835) he took ship to Colombo, Ceylon, via the Cape of Good Hope and in this year became a Corresponding Member of the Zoological Society of London. A brief sojourn in Ceylon was followed by a stay in Malta (1836). Later in 1836 he moved on to Corfu and Albania. In all these places Templeton collected insects and other invertebrates and in 1839 he became a Corresponding Member of the Entomological Society of London.

A twelve-year stay in Ceylon (1839–1851) followed, and in 1847 Templeton was promoted from Assistant Surgeon to Surgeon. In these years at various times he visited Southern India - Madras, Tamil Nadu, Andhra Pradesh, Kerala, Karnataka - and twice Northern India Uttarakhand and Kashmir. Recalled from Ceylon in 1852 due to the unrest in Europe which was to erupt in the bloody and terrible Crimean War, he served in the Crimea from March 1854 – 1856 and was promoted to Surgeon-Major on 7 December 1855. After serving in Crimean, he was stationed in Dublin. He retired with the honorary rank of Deputy Inspector General of Hospitals on 31 January 1860.

He died on 2 June 1892 in Edinburgh.

== Family ==
He married Mary Slade in 1851 and they had two sons and a daughter; their son Robert Stanser Templeton later became surveyor general of Ceylon.

== Work on Thysanura ==
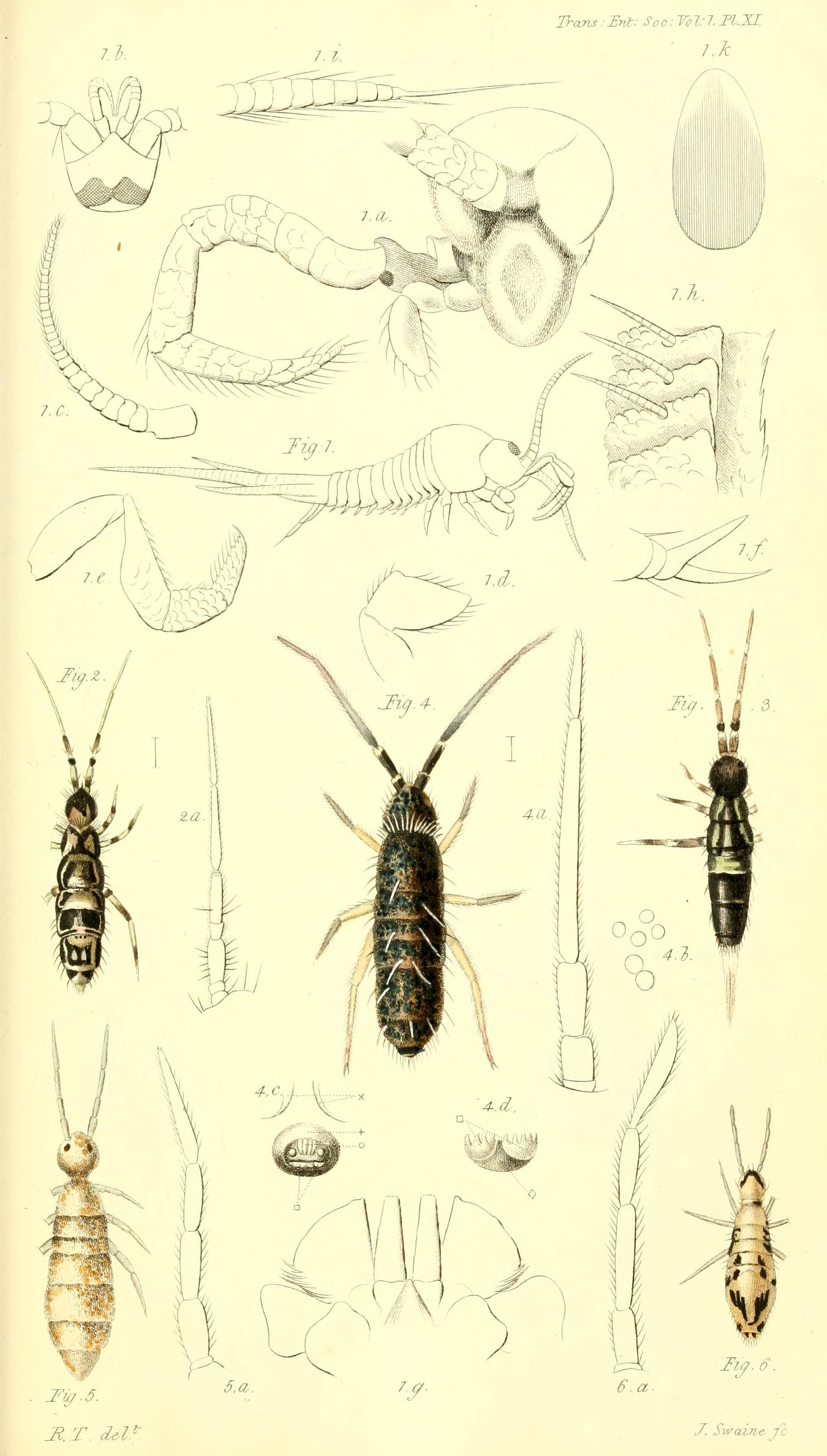
Thysanurae hibernicaePlate 11

Templeton was particularly interested in the Thysanura and his first published entomological paper concerns these insects. Thysanurae hibernicae (Irish bristle tails and spring-tails) was published in the first volume of the Transactions of the Entomological Society of London for 1836 and is the first significant work in English on these primitive insects, remaining so until 1875. In this short work prefaced by John Obadiah Westwood Templeton described two new genera and twelve new species accompanied by two plates showing whole animals and details of structure. Forty years later the entomologist Lubbock paid tribute to Templeton's early work by naming a thysanuran genus after him - Templetonia.

== Work on spiders ==
Much of Templeton's early work and very much in Ceylon was on spiders. Studies of Irish spiders were passed to John Blackwall who incorporated the notes and drawings into his own work. Oddly, although he collected my old pets the spiders, he published very little on them.

== Work on Sri Lankan arthropods ==
In Ceylon Templeton worked mainly on Lepidoptera, Coleoptera and Hymenoptera alongside Edgar Leopold Layard (1824–1900). New species of Lepidoptera collected by Templeton and Layard were described by Frederic Moore, Francis Walker and George Robert Gray. The new Coleoptera were described by Joseph Sugar Baly, Francis Walker, John Obadiah Westwood, Carl August Dohrn and Francis Polkinghorne Pascoe. Templeton's publications on Lepidoptera amount to some general comments on papilionid butterflies and two species descriptions - Oiketicus terlius and Oiketicus (Cryptothelia) consortus.

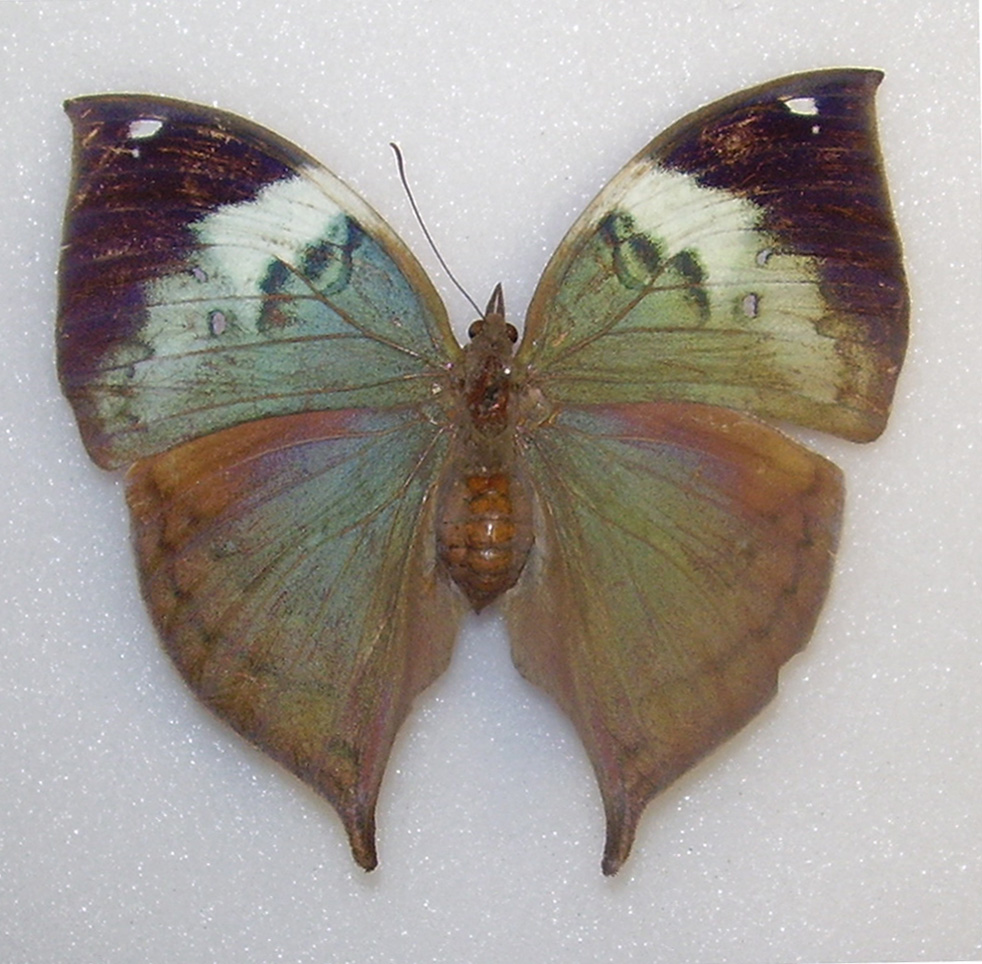
A Ceylon blue oakleaf butterfly Kallima philarchus from the Templeton Collection at the Ulster Museum

The bulk of the new beetles, some of the Hymenoptera (the rest were described by Frederick Smith) and other insects in Templeton's collection were described by Francis Walker who also compiled the first list of the insects of Ceylon for Tennent's book Ceylon, Physical, Historical and Topographical based on the collections of Templeton, Layard, the British Museum and the Museum of the East India Company; there are 2,000 species and Layard and Templeton captured between them 932 species of butterflies and moths in Ceylon, many new to science. Templeton supplied many of the insects incorporated in Westwood's book Oriental Cabinet, one of which, the beetle Compsosternus templetonii bears his name.

Unfortunately only the published part of Templeton's correspondence with Westwood (the Secretary of the Entomological Society) survived, the manuscripts are apparently lost. Templeton's Ceylon insect collection was apparently divided between the Belfast Museum (now in the National Museum of Ireland), the Entomological Society of London and the British Museum (the Entomological Society's collections are now incorporated in those of the latter institution). Templeton's watercolour paintings of Ceylon butterflies are in the Ulster Museum, Belfast. Templeton, Layard and George Henry Kendrick Thwaites and later John Nietner (died 1874) contributed almost all that was known of the insect fauna of the island at the end of the first half of the nineteenth century including a privately printed list of Thysanura, Myriapoda, Scorpionidea, Cheliferidae and Phrynidae (now Amblypygi) from Ceylon which is not traced, and remarked on the habits of the large poisonous centipedes Scolopendra pallipes and S. crassa in two (published) communications to Westwood. Many of his manuscripts were lost when the clipper Memnon sank in 1851.

== Templeton Insect Collection ==
The Ceylon insects are in the Natural History Museum, London. Many are Types of the new species described by Francis Walker.

- Walker F. 1858 Characters of some apparently undescribed Ceylon insects Annals and Magazine of Natural History 3rd series Volume 2 1858: 202–209
- Walker F. 1858 Characters of some apparently undescribed Ceylon insects Annals and Magazine of Natural History 3rd series Volume 2 1858: 280–286
- 1859 Characters of some apparently undescribed Ceylon insects Annals and Magazine of Natural History 3rd series Volume 3 : 50–56
- 1859 Characters of some apparently undescribed Ceylon insects Annals and Magazine of Natural History 3rd series Volume 3: 258–265
- 1859 Characters of some apparently undescribed Ceylon insects Annals and Magazine of Natural History 3rd series Volume 4:217–224
- 1859 Characters of some apparently undescribed Ceylon insects Annals and Magazine of Natural History 3rd series Volume 4:370–376
- 1860 Characters of some apparently undescribed Ceylon insects Annals and Magazine of Natural History 3rd series Volume5:304–311
- 1860 Characters of some apparently undescribed Ceylon insects Annals and Magazine of Natural History 3rd series Volume 6: 357–360

== Work on Mollusca and Annelida ==
Part of Templeton's Mollusca collection was described as comprising several new and rare species hitherto undescribed. Amongst others are new species of each of these genera: Achatina, Helix, Neritina, Ampullaria, Valvata, Planorbis and Melania. Robert Templeton sent back to the Belfast Museum specimens of the Ceylonese pearl mussel showing growth stages of the mussels from the famous pearl fisheries of Ceylon. He also described two species of land-slug (Vaginula maculata and Parfnacella tennenti) from Ceylon. It was Templeton who described the extraordinary giant earthworm Megascole caeruleus from Ceylon which is between 20 and 40 inches long and has a thickness of nearly an inch or more.

== Work on birds and mammals ==
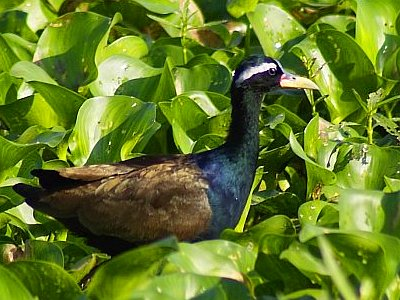
Bronzewinged jacana

Templeton also studied the vertebrates of the island, especially the fish, birds and monkeys. Amongst the birds were five endemic species new to science. These were described by Edward Blyth in the Calcutta Journal as Athene castanotus, the chestnut-winged hawk owl; Malacocercus rufescens, the red dung thrush; Dicrurus edoliformis, the kingcrow, Dicrurus leucopyygialis the Ceylon kingcrow, and Eulabes ptilogenes, Templeton's mynah. The monkeys were studiously appraised and some of the results communicated to the Zoological Society of London. These communications, one of the monkey Cercopithecus pileatus and the loris Loris gracilis and the other on a supposed new species Semnopithecus leucoprymnus cephalopterus which turned out to be identical with Bennet's Semnopithecus nestor, are Templetons only personal contribution to the literature on the vertebrates of Ceylon. His knowledge of the smaller mammals, birds, reptiles and fishes was instead incorporated in the work of others, notably George Robert Waterhouse and his coworker Edgar Leopold Layard who in the introduction to Notes on the Ornithology of Ceylon says "I have had the advantage of consulting with Mr. Blyth and Drs. Templeton and Kelaart with each of whom i have been on terms of the closest intimacy and we mutually communicated our discoveries".

== Insects named for Templeton ==
- Campsosternus templetoni Westwood, 1848 (Oxynopterinae, Elateridae )
- Chrysomela templetoni Baly, 1860 (Chrysomelinae, Chrysomelidae )
- Sebasmia templetoni Pascoe, 1859 (Cerambycinae, Cerambycidae )
- Pseudanophthalmus templetoni Valentine

== Reptiles named for Templeton ==
- Oligodon templetoni, Templeton's kukri snake, junior synonym of Oligodon calamarius

== Works ==
- 1833 Figures and descriptions of Irish Arachnida and Acari . Unpublished Ms. Hope Department of Entomology Library. University of Oxford.
- 1833a. On the spiders of the genus Dysdera Latr. with the descriptions of a new allied genus. Zoological Journal 5: 400 -406, pl. 17.
- 1834. (as C. M. ) An illustration of the structure of some of the organs of a spider, deemed the type of a new genus and proposal to be called Trichopus libratus. Magazine of Natural History 7: 10 13.
- 1834a. (as C. M. ) Illustrations of some species of British animals which are not generally known or have hitherto not been described. Mag. Nat. Hist. 3: 129–131. 1834a
- 1838. Descriptions of a few vertebrate animals obtained at the Isle of France Proc. Zool. Soc.Lond. 2: 111–112
- 1836. Catalogue of Irish Crustacea, Myriapoda and Arachnoida, selected from the papers of the late John Templeton Esq. Mag. Nat. Hist. . 9: 9–14
- 1836a. A catalogue of the species annulose animals and of rayed ones found in Ireland as selected from the papers of the late J Templeton Esq. of Cranmore with localities, descriptions and illustrations. Mag. Nat. Hist. . 9: 233- 240; 301 305; 417–421; 466 -472.
- 1836b. Thysanurae Hibernicae or descriptions of such species of spring-tailed insects (Podura and Lepisma Linn. ) as have been observed in Ireland. Trans. Ent. Soc. Lond. 1: 89–98, pls. 11, 12.
- 1836c. Descriptions of some undescribed exotic Crustacea. Trans. Ent. Soc. Lond. 1: 185 198, pls. 20, 21, 22.
- 1836d. Description of a new hemipterous insect from the Atlantic Ocean. Trans. Ent. Soc. Lond. . 1: 230–232, pl. 22.
- 1837. Irish vertebrate animals selected from the papers of the late . John Templeton Esq., Mag. Nat. Hist . 1: (n. s. ): 403–413 403 -413.
- 1837a. Description of a new Irish crustaceous animal. Trans. Ent. Soc. Lond. 2: 34–40, pl. 5. .
- 1838a. Description of a new Irish crustaceous animal. Trans. Ent. Soc. Lond. Trans. Ent. Soc. Lond. 2: 114 120, pl. 12.
- 1840. Description of a minute crustaceous animal from the island of Mauritius. Trans. Ent. Soc. Lond. 2: 203 206, pl. 18.
- 1841. Description of a new strepsipterous insect. Trans. Ent. Soc. Lond. 3: 51–56, pl. 4.
- 1841a. Positions in Ceylon. Geogr. Soc. Journ. 1841 10: 579–580.
- 1843. Memoir on the genus Cermatia and some other exotic Annulosa. Trans. Ent Soc. Lond 3: 302- 309, pls. 16, 17.
- 1844. Description of Megascolex caeruleus Proc. Zoo. Soc. Lond. 12:89–91 Froriep. ? Notizen 1845 34: 181 183.
- 1844a. On some varieties of the monkeys of Ceylon, Cercopithecus pileatus and Loris gracilis. Proc. Zoo. Soc. Lond. 1844: 3; Ann. Mag. Nat. Hist. 1844 14: 361–362.
- 1844b. Communication, accompanied with drawings of Semnopithecus leucoprymnus nestor Benn. Proc. Zool. Soc. 1844: 1.
- 1847. Description of some species of the lepidopterous genus Oiketicus from Ceylon. Trans. Ent. Soc. Lond. 5: 30–40.
- 1847a. Notes upon Ceylonese Lepidoptera. Trans. Ent. Soc. Lond. 5: 44–45.
- 1851. Description of a new species of Sorex from India. Proc. Zool. Soc. Lond. 1851 21: 106;
- 1855 ? Ann. Nat. Hist. 15: 238–239.
- 1858. On a new species of Vaginula from Ceylon. Ann. Mag. Nat. Hist. 1: 49–50, plate 18 – Acetate of Strychnine useful to entomologists.
- 18- List of Thysanura, Myriapoda, Scorpionidae, Cheliferidae and Phrynidae of Ceylon. Author, Colombo.

== See also ==
- William de Alwis
