= Herpetoreas murlen =

Scientific classification
- Kingdom: Animalia
- Phylum: Chordata
- Class: Reptilia
- Order: Squamata
- Suborder: Serpentes
- Family: Colubridae
- Genus: Herpetoreas
- Species: H. murlen

Binomial name
- Herpetoreas murlen Lalremsanga, Bal, G. Vogel & Biakzuala, 2022

Species of snake

Herpetoreas murlen, also known commonly as the Murlen keelback, is a species of snake in the subfamily Natricinae of the family Colubridae. The species is endemic to India.
