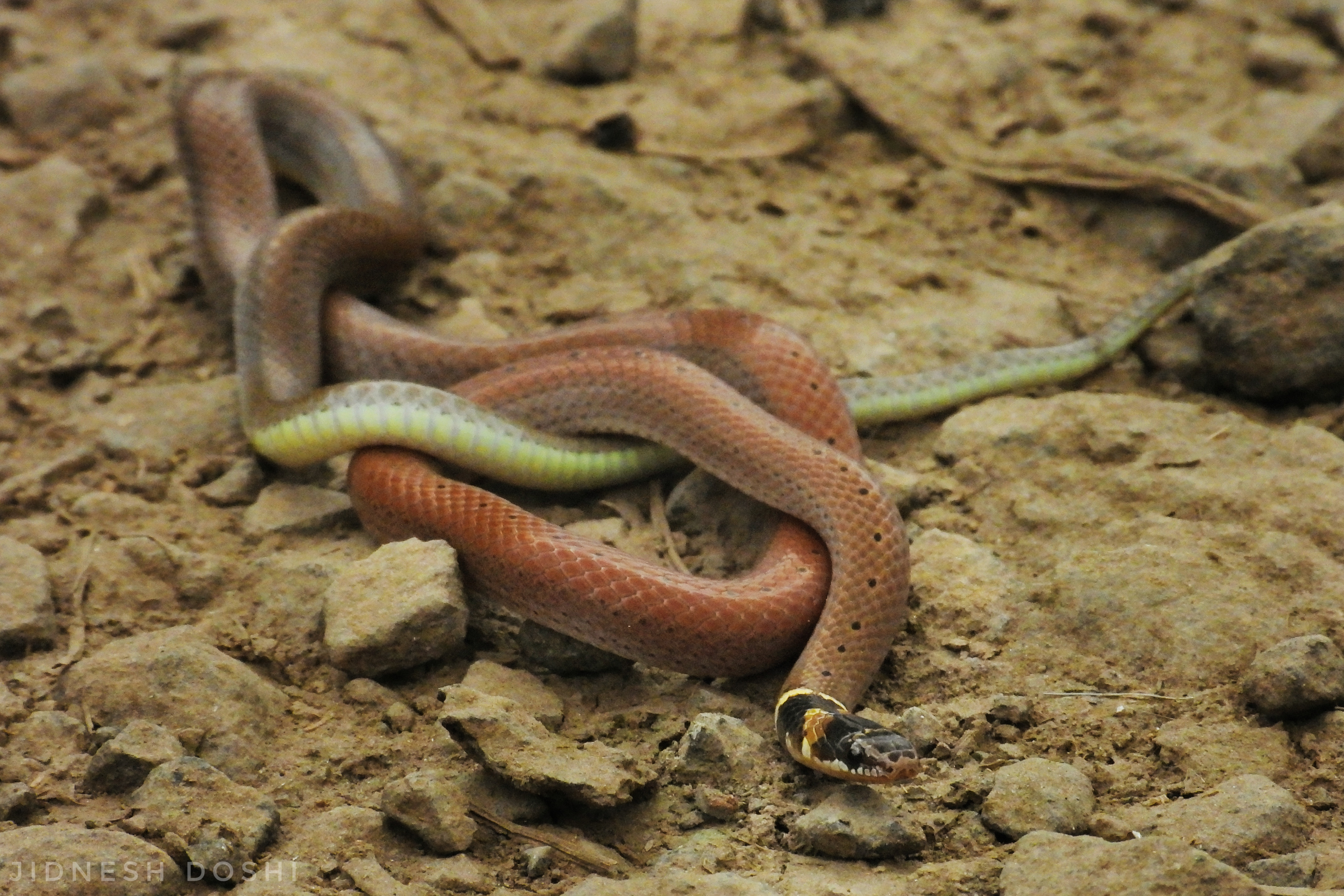

Conservation status
- Least Concern (IUCN 3.1)

Scientific classification
- Kingdom: Animalia
- Phylum: Chordata
- Class: Reptilia
- Order: Squamata
- Suborder: Serpentes
- Family: Colubridae
- Genus: Sibynophis
- Species: S. subpunctatus

Binomial name
- Sibynophis subpunctatus (A.M.C. Duméril, Bibron & A.H.A. Duméril, 1854)

Synonyms
- Polyodontophis subpunctatus A.M.C Duméril, Bibron & A.H.A Duméril, 1854

= Sibynophis subpunctatus =

Species of snake

Sibynophis subpunctatus, commonly known as Duméril's black-headed snake or Jerdon's many-toothed snake, is a species of nonvenomous colubrid snake endemic to Bangladesh, India, Sri Lanka, and Nepal.

== Behavior ==
Sibynophis subpunctatus is active by day as well as at night. It lives in leaf litter, preying on geckos, skinks, and smaller snakes.

== Description ==
Maximum size is 18 inches (46 cm).

Rostral scale nearly twice as broad as deep; suture between the internasals a little shorter than that between the prefrontals; frontal longer than its distance from the end of the snout, as long as the parietals or a little shorter; loreal longer than deep; one preocular; two postoculars, both in contact with the parietal; temporals 1 (or 2) + 2; 9 or 10 upper labials, fifth and sixth, or fourth, fifth, and sixth, entering the eye; eighth upper labial usually excluded from the labial margin, simulating a lower anterior temporal; 4 lower labials in contact with the anterior chin shields, the first lower labial usually separated from its fellow by the mental; posterior chin shields a little longer than the anterior chin shields.

Dorsal scales in 17 rows. Ventrals 151-220 (240 according to Blanford); anal divided; subcaudals 47-76.

Pale brown above, with a vertebral series of small round black spots; usually a more or less distinct dark lateral line or series of dots; head and nape dark brown or black; lips, canthus rostralis, a transverse line between the eyes, and two broad cross-bands, one in front and one behind the nape, all yellow; the dark colour often extending along the median line, bisecting the yellow collar; lower surfaces yellow, each shield with a black dot near its outer border.

Sri Lankan specimens have 157 to 176 ventrals and 52-64 subcaudals.

== Geographic range ==
Sibynophis subpunctatus occurs in Bangladesh, through most of India including the Western Ghats, Eastern Ghats and pockets of Central India as well as in Sri Lanka. Specimens from the Northeast of India are probably those of Sibynophis sagittarius. In Sri Lanka it is found mostly towards the west coast from Puttalam to Kalutara.

== Other references ==
- Duméril, A.M.C., G. Bibron & A.H.A. Duméril 1854 Erpétologie générale ou Histoire Naturelle complète des Reptiles. Vol. 7 (partie 1). Paris, xvi + 780 S.
- Sharma, Satish Kumar 1998 Range extension of the Dumeril's black-headed snake Sibynophis subpunctatus (Dum. & Bibr., 1854) Cobra 32: 32-33.
- Vyas, Raju 1986 Extension of the range of Dumeril's black headed snake (Sibynophis subpunctatus). Hamadryad 11 (3): 24.
