= Sibynophis triangularis =

Conservation status
- Near Threatened (IUCN 3.1)

Scientific classification
- Kingdom: Animalia
- Phylum: Chordata
- Class: Reptilia
- Order: Squamata
- Suborder: Serpentes
- Family: Colubridae
- Genus: Sibynophis
- Species: S. triangularis

Binomial name
- Sibynophis triangularis Taylor & Elbel, 1958

Species of snake

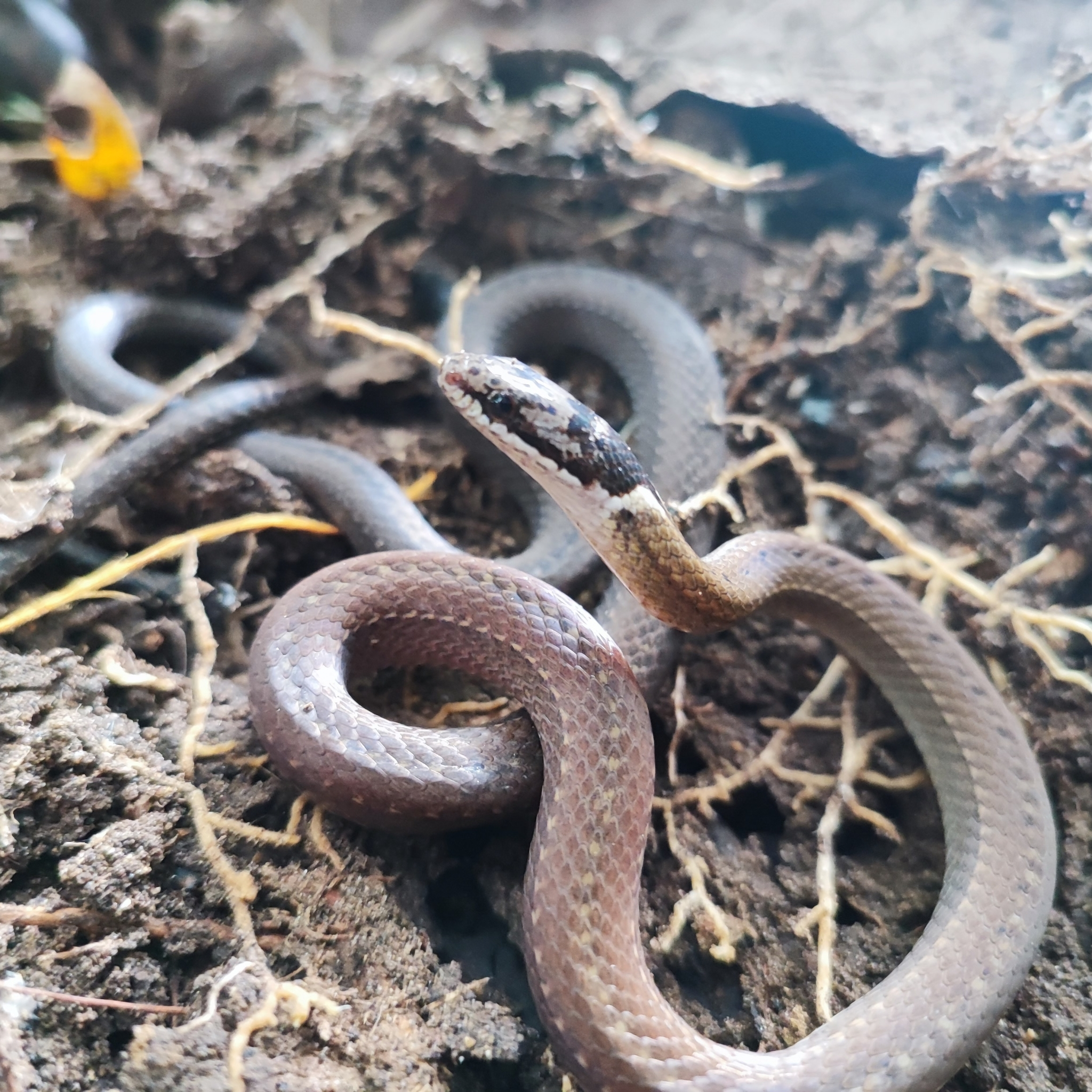

Sibynophis triangularis, commonly known as the triangle many-tooth snake or triangulate collared snake, is a nonvenomous species of colubrid snake found in Thailand and Cambodia.
