= Liopeltis tricolor =

Conservation status
- Least Concern (IUCN 3.1)

Scientific classification
- Kingdom: Animalia
- Phylum: Chordata
- Class: Reptilia
- Order: Squamata
- Suborder: Serpentes
- Family: Colubridae
- Genus: Liopeltis
- Species: L. tricolor

Binomial name
- Liopeltis tricolor (Schlegel, 1837)

Species of snake

Liopeltis tricolor, commonly known as the Malayan ringneck or tricoloured ringneck , is a species of nonvenomous snake in the family Colubridae. It is found in Indonesia, Brunei, Malaysia, the Philippines, Singapore; Thailand, and Vietnam. One of only a few snakes that feed exclusively on insects.
