= Sibynophis geminatus =

Conservation status
- Least Concern (IUCN 3.1)

Scientific classification
- Kingdom: Animalia
- Phylum: Chordata
- Class: Reptilia
- Order: Squamata
- Suborder: Serpentes
- Family: Colubridae
- Genus: Sibynophis
- Species: S. geminatus

Binomial name
- Sibynophis geminatus (Boie, 1826)

Species of snake

Sibynophis geminatus, commonly known as Boie's many-toothed snake, is a species of nonvenomous colubrid snake found in Thailand, Malaysia, Indonesia, and the Philippines.
