= Liopeltis stoliczkae =

Conservation status
- Least Concern (IUCN 3.1)

Scientific classification
- Kingdom: Animalia
- Phylum: Chordata
- Class: Reptilia
- Order: Squamata
- Suborder: Serpentes
- Family: Colubridae
- Genus: Liopeltis
- Species: L. stoliczkae

Binomial name
- Liopeltis stoliczkae (Sclater, 1891)

Synonyms
- Ablabes stoliczkae Sclater, 1891; Liopeltis stoliczkae — Wall, 1924

Species of snake

Liopeltis stoliczkae is a species of snake in the family Colubridae. The species is native to parts of South Asia and Southeast Asia.

== Etymology ==
The specific name, stoliczkae, is in honor of Moravian zoologist Ferdinand Stoliczka.

== Description ==
The following description of L. stoliczkae is from Malcolm A. Smith (1943):

Maxillary teeth 27 or 28; head distinct from neck, much depressed; snout projecting, twice as long as the eye; nostril very small, in an elongated undivided nasal; loreal squarish, sometimes united with the posterior nasal; eight supralabials, 4th and 5th touching the eye; genials subequal. Scales in 15:15:13 rows. Ventrals 148–154; Caudals 116–134; Anals 2.

Greyish above and lighter below with a broad black stripe on the side of the head, extending and gradually fading, on the fore part of the body; a grey stripe on the outer margins of the ventrals and a less distinct and thinner median one present or absent.

Total length: males 600 mm (24 in), tail 225 mm (8.9 in); females 545 mm (21.5 in), tail 205 mm (8.1 in).

== Geographic range ==
L. stoliczkae is found in Northeast India (type locality: Naga Hills; Sikkim, Assam, Arunachal Pradesh), Myanmar, Laos, and Cambodia.

== Habitat ==
The preferred natural habitat of L. stoliczkae is forest.

== Reproduction ==
L. stoliczkae is oviparous.
