= Liopeltis tiomanica =

Scientific classification
- Kingdom: Animalia
- Phylum: Chordata
- Class: Reptilia
- Order: Squamata
- Suborder: Serpentes
- Family: Colubridae
- Genus: Liopeltis
- Species: L. tiomanica

Binomial name
- Liopeltis tiomanica Som, Grismer, Grismer, Wood, Quah, Brown, Diesmos, Weinell, & Stuart, 2020

Species of snake

Liopeltis tiomanica is a species of nonvenomous snake in the family Colubridae. It is found in Malaysia.
