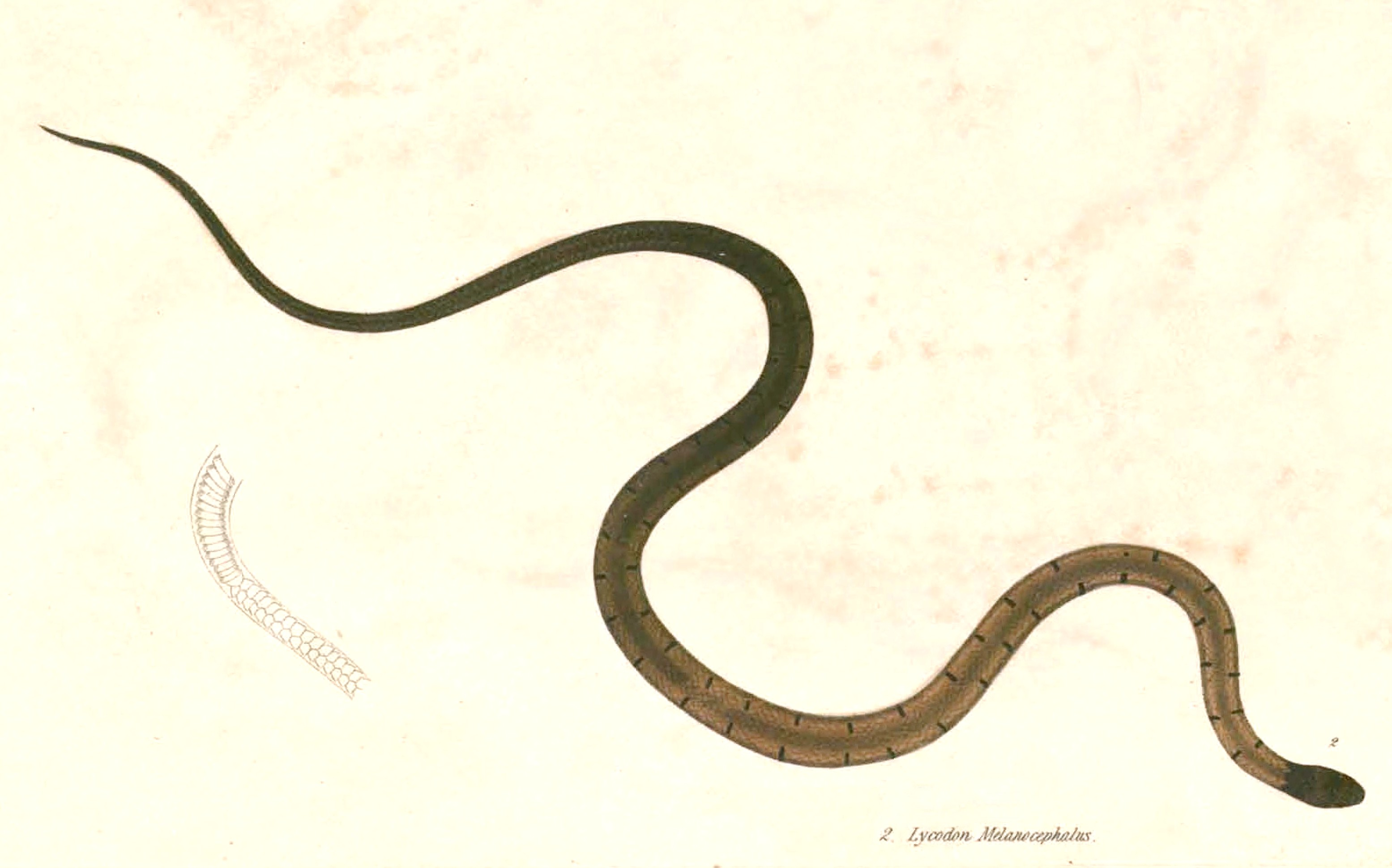

Conservation status
- Least Concern (IUCN 3.1)

Scientific classification
- Kingdom: Animalia
- Phylum: Chordata
- Class: Reptilia
- Order: Squamata
- Suborder: Serpentes
- Family: Colubridae
- Genus: Sibynophis
- Species: S. melanocephalus

Binomial name
- Sibynophis melanocephalus (JE Gray, 1834)

= Sibynophis melanocephalus =

Species of snake

Sibynophis melanocephalus, commonly known as the black-headed collared snake or Malayan many-toothed snake, is a nonvenomous species of colubrid snake found in Thailand, Malaysia, Indonesia, Singapore, and Vietnam.
