= Assam keelback =

Conservation status
- Data Deficient (IUCN 3.1)

Scientific classification
- Kingdom: Animalia
- Phylum: Chordata
- Class: Reptilia
- Order: Squamata
- Suborder: Serpentes
- Family: Colubridae
- Genus: Herpetoreas
- Species: H. pealii

Binomial name
- Herpetoreas pealii (Sclater, 1891)

Synonyms
- Tropidonotus pealii Sclater, 1891; Amphiesma pealii (Sclater, 1891); Hebius pealii (Sclater, 1891); Natrix pealii (Sclater, 1891); Paranatrix pealii (Sclater, 1891)

Species of snake

The Assam keelback (Herpetoreas pealii), commonly known as Peal's keelback, is a species of snake in the subfamily Natricinae of the family Colubridae. The species is endemic to Northeast India. It has recently been rediscovered after 129 years in Arunachal Pradesh.

== Etymology ==
The specific name, pealii, is in honor of Samuel E. Peal (died 1897), an ethnographer and tea planter in Assam, who collected the two specimens from which British zoologist William Lutley Sclater described this snake as a species new to science.

== Geographic distribution ==
Herpetoreas pealii has been recorded from the Indian states of Assam and Arunachal Pradesh.

== Habitat ==
The preferred natural habitat of Herpetoreas pealii is forest.

== Description ==
Herpetoreas pealii may attain a total length of 50 cm (19 5/8 inches), which includes a tail 12.5 cm (4 7/8 inches) long.

Dorsally, it is dark brown. On each side are two light stripes, an upper narrow one, and a broader lower one, which is two scales wide. The top of the head is dark brown. The rostral, the upper labials, and the lower labials are yellow, blotched and edged with brown. The ventrals are very dark brown, marked with light yellow laterally. There is also a faint yellow stripe along the center of the ventrals, which becomes more distinct posteriorly.

The dorsal scales are strongly keeled (less strongly in the outermost row), and arranged in 19 rows at midbody. Ventrals 142–144; anal plate entire; subcaudals 75–77, divided.

== Behavior ==
Herpetodryas pealii is terrestrial.

== Reproduction ==
Herpetoreas pealii is oviparous.
