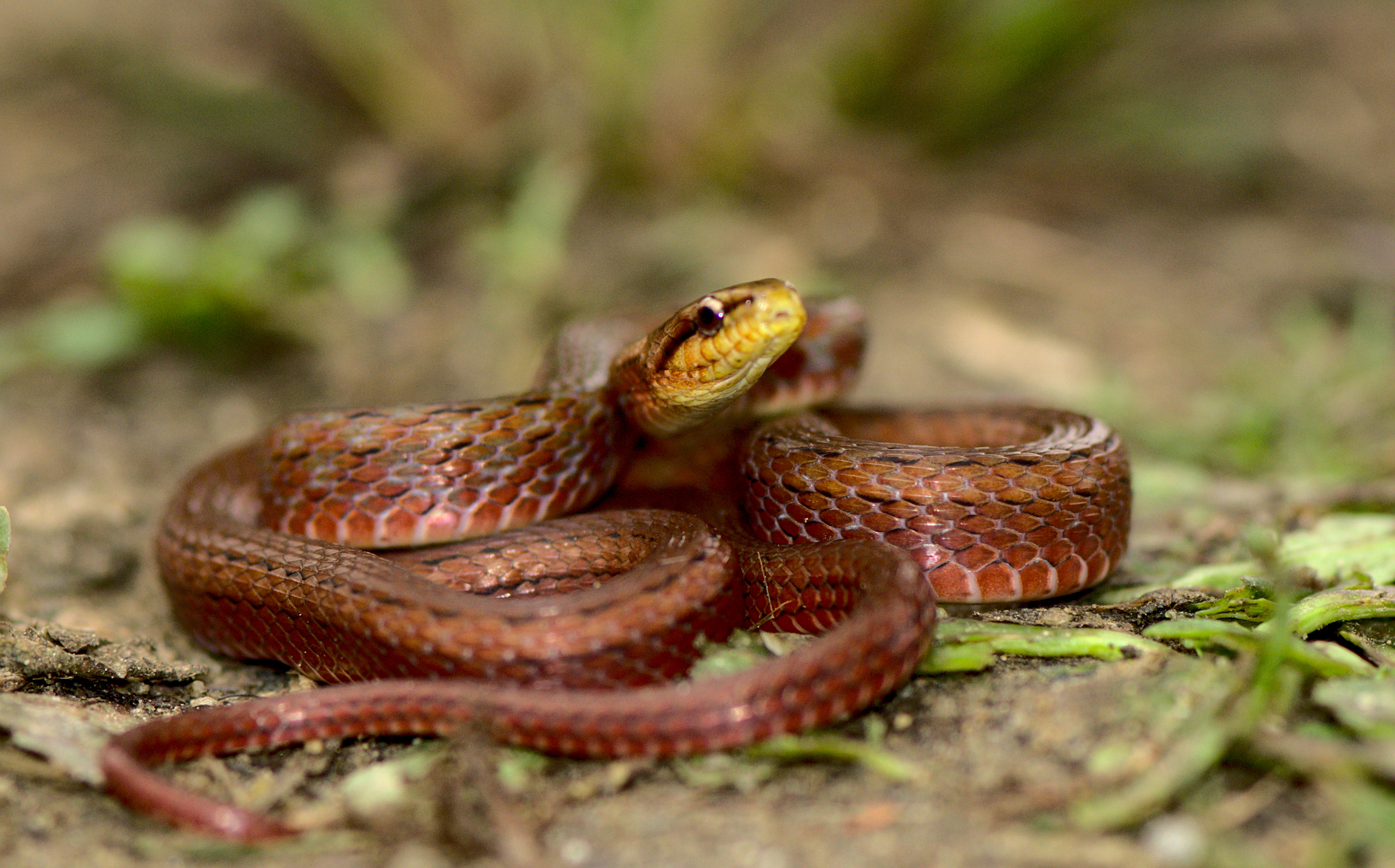

Conservation status
- Data Deficient (IUCN 3.1)

Scientific classification
- Kingdom: Animalia
- Phylum: Chordata
- Class: Reptilia
- Order: Squamata
- Suborder: Serpentes
- Family: Colubridae
- Genus: Herpetoreas
- Species: H. sieboldii

Binomial name
- Herpetoreas sieboldii (Günther, 1860)

Synonyms
- Herpetoreas sieboldii Günther, 1860; Amphiesma sieboldii — Das, 1996; Herpetoreas sieboldii — Guo et al., 2014

= Sikkim keelback =

Species of reptile

The Sikkim keelback (Herpetoreas sieboldii) is a species of grass snake in the family Colubridae. The species is endemic to South Asia and Myanmar. It is closely related to the Himalayan keelback, and some treat this species as a synonym (Tillack 2003).

== Geographic range ==
H. sieboldii is found in Bangladesh, Bhutan, India (Punjab, Sikkim, Uttar Pradesh), Myanmar (formerly called Burma), Nepal, and Pakistan.

== Etymology ==
The specific name, sieboldii, is in honor of German zoologist Karl Theodor Ernst von Siebold.

== Reproduction ==
H. sieboldii is oviparous.
