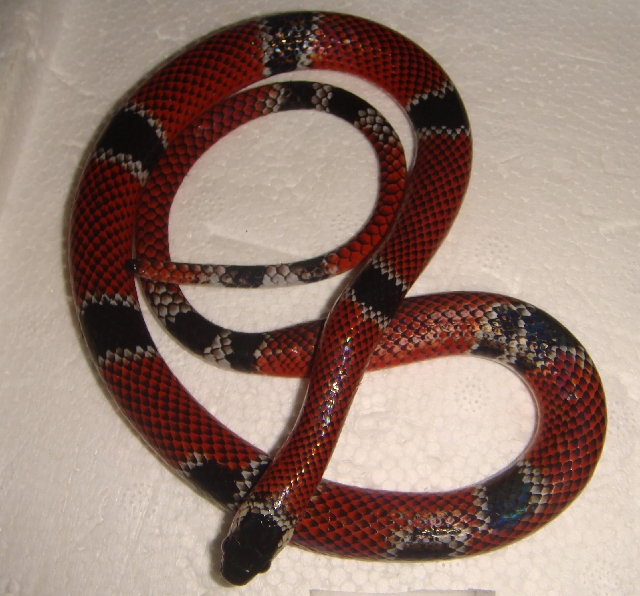

Conservation status
- Least Concern (IUCN 3.1)

Scientific classification
- Domain: Eukaryota
- Kingdom: Animalia
- Phylum: Chordata
- Class: Reptilia
- Order: Squamata
- Suborder: Serpentes
- Family: Colubridae
- Genus: Scaphiodontophis
- Species: S. venustissimus

Binomial name
- Scaphiodontophis venustissimus (Günther, 1893)

Synonyms
- Henicognathus venustissimus Günther, 1893

= Scaphiodontophis venustissimus =

Species of snake

Scaphiodontophis venustissimus, commonly known as the common neckband snake, is a snake of the colubrid family.

== Geographic distribution ==
The snake is found in Colombia, Costa Rica, Honduras, Nicaragua, Panama.
