= Liopeltis pallidonuchalis =

Scientific classification
- Kingdom: Animalia
- Phylum: Chordata
- Class: Reptilia
- Order: Squamata
- Suborder: Serpentes
- Family: Colubridae
- Genus: Liopeltis
- Species: L. pallidonuchalis

Binomial name
- Liopeltis pallidonuchalis Poyarkov, Nguyen, & Vogel, 2019

Species of snake

Liopeltis pallidonuchalis, commonly known as the pale-necked ringneck , is a species of nonvenomous snake in the family Colubridae. It is found in Vietnam.
