= Herpetoreas tpser =

Scientific classification
- Kingdom: Animalia
- Phylum: Chordata
- Class: Reptilia
- Order: Squamata
- Suborder: Serpentes
- Family: Colubridae
- Genus: Herpetoreas
- Species: H. tpser

Binomial name
- Herpetoreas tpser Ren, Jiang, Huang, David, & Li, 2022

Species of snake

Herpetoreas tpser is a species of natricine snake endemic to India.
