= Sibynophis bivittatus =

Conservation status
- Least Concern (IUCN 3.1)

Scientific classification
- Domain: Eukaryota
- Kingdom: Animalia
- Phylum: Chordata
- Class: Reptilia
- Order: Squamata
- Suborder: Serpentes
- Family: Colubridae
- Genus: Sibynophis
- Species: S. bivittatus

Binomial name
- Sibynophis bivittatus (Boulenger, 1894)

Species of snake

Sibynophis bivittatus, commonly known as the white-striped snake, is a nonvenomous species of colubrid snake found in the Philippines.
