= Sibynophis bistrigatus =

Conservation status
- Data Deficient (IUCN 3.1)

Scientific classification
- Kingdom: Animalia
- Phylum: Chordata
- Class: Reptilia
- Order: Squamata
- Suborder: Serpentes
- Family: Colubridae
- Genus: Sibynophis
- Species: S. bistrigatus

Binomial name
- Sibynophis bistrigatus (Günther, 1868)

Synonyms
- Ablabes bistrigatus Günther, 1868; Polyodontophis bistrigatus (Günther, 1868)

Species of snake

Sibynophis bistrigatus, commonly known as Günther's many-toothed snake, is a species of nonvenomous colubrid snake found in Myanmar (formerly called Burma) and India (Nicobar Islands), but snakes collected in Myanmar and the Nicobar Islands might actually not refer to the same species. This rare snake is known from tropical dry forests.
