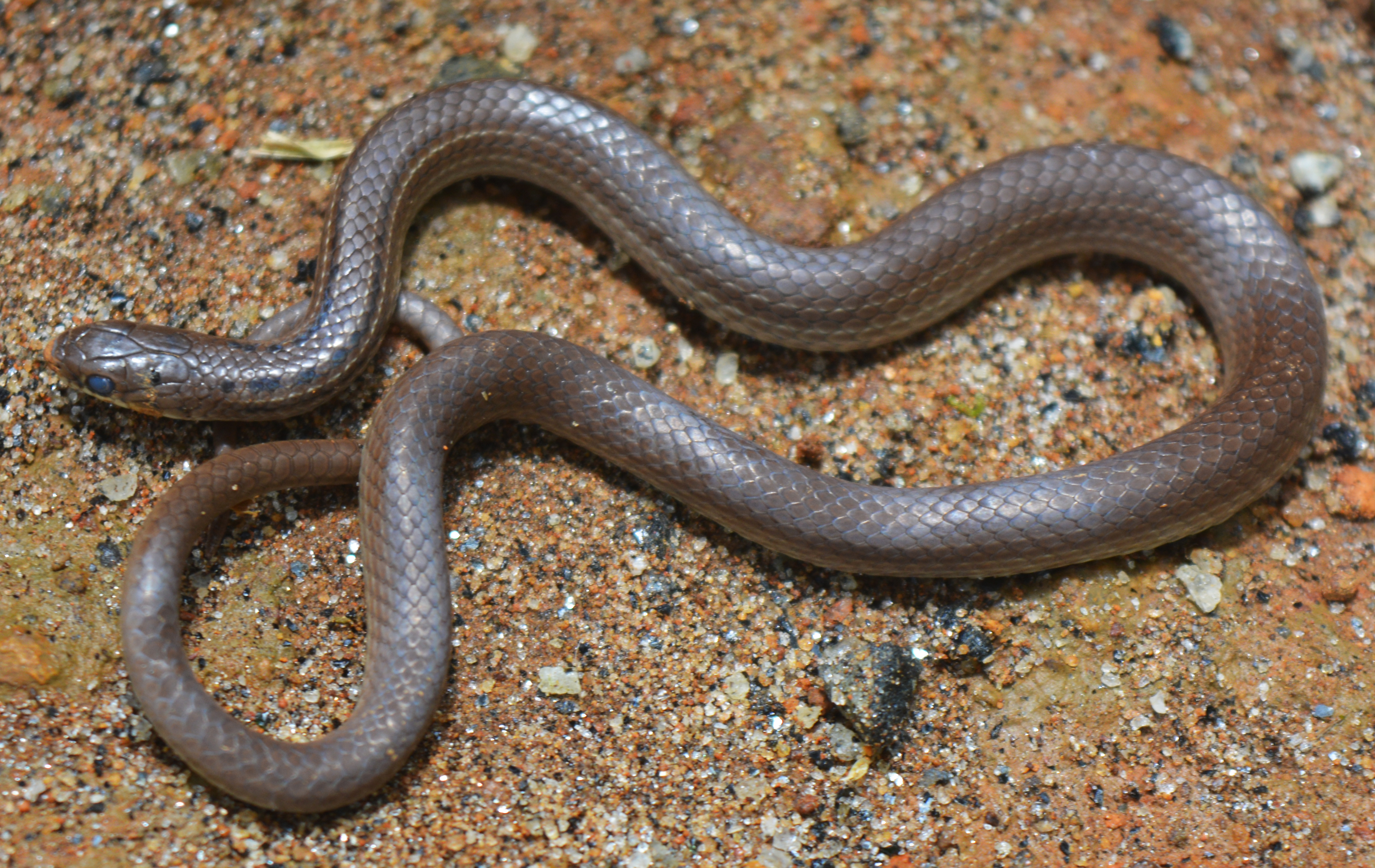

Conservation status
- Least Concern (IUCN 3.1)

Scientific classification
- Kingdom: Animalia
- Phylum: Chordata
- Class: Reptilia
- Order: Squamata
- Suborder: Serpentes
- Family: Colubridae
- Genus: Liopeltis
- Species: L. calamaria

Binomial name
- Liopeltis calamaria (Günther, 1858)

= Liopeltis calamaria =

Species of snake

The calamaria reed snake (Liopeltis calamaria) is a species of snake found in some parts of South Asia.

== Description ==
The following description is from Malcolm Arthur Smith's The Fauna of British India, Including Ceylon and Burma. Reptilia and Batrachia volume, (page 184–185).

Maxillary teeth 24–26; head not depressed and fairly distinct from the neck; snout not projecting, not twice as long as the eye; nostril very small and in a long undivided nasal, which is united with the loreal; normally 7 supralabials, rarely only 6, 3rd and 4th touching the eye; anterior genials a little longer than the posterior. Scales in 15:15:15 rows. Ventrals 126–142 in the male and 130–154 in the female. Caudals 68–78 in males and 53–72 in the females.

Hemipenis like that of frenatus in general construction, but the calyces smaller, more deeply scalloped, and packed so closely together that only the papillae are visible on the surface; the spines are shorter, thicker and more numerous; there is a fold.

Light brown, greyish-brown or greenish, above, the scales usually edged with black, showing as more or less distinct longitudinal lines, the most conspicuous being one on each side of the vertebral region; they are separated from each other by five rows of scales. The area enclosed between them may be of a darker colour than that of the rest of the body; lower parts whitish (yellow in life); a series of dark spots on each side of the head, the remnants of the temporal stripes.

Total length of male 335 mm (tail 108 mm); females 390 mm long with the tail of 100 mm.

== Geographic range ==
Found in Sri Lanka, Bangladesh, India {the Western Ghats as far north as Matheran; Tirunelveli Hills, Mysore Plateau, Bangalore, Almora district, Chhota Nagpur (Surguja)}, Nepal (Chitwan) and possibly in Bhutan.
