= Coluber vittacaudatus =

Scientific classification
- Kingdom: Animalia
- Phylum: Chordata
- Class: Reptilia
- Order: Squamata
- Suborder: Serpentes
- Family: Colubridae
- Genus: Coluber
- Species: C. vittacaudatus

Binomial name
- Coluber vittacaudatus Blyth, 1854

Species of snake

Coluber vittacaudatus is a species of snake found in Darjeeling, India.

== Distribution ==
Type locality: from "vicinity of Darjiling" (= Darjeeling, 27° 02'N; 88° 16'E; West Bengal State, eastern India). Known only from the type locality. Named after "vittacaudatus" = Latin for striped tail.
