= Liopeltis frenata =

Günther's Reed Snake

Conservation status
- Least Concern (IUCN 3.1)

Scientific classification
- Kingdom: Animalia
- Phylum: Chordata
- Class: Reptilia
- Order: Squamata
- Suborder: Serpentes
- Family: Colubridae
- Genus: Liopeltis
- Species: L. frenata

Binomial name
- Liopeltis frenata (Günther, 1858)

Species of snake

Günther's reed snake (Liopeltis frenata) is a species of snake. Distribution: India (Assam, Arunachal Pradesh (Namdapha - Changlang district) ), Myanmar (= Burma), Laos, Vietnam, China (Tibet, Yunnan)
