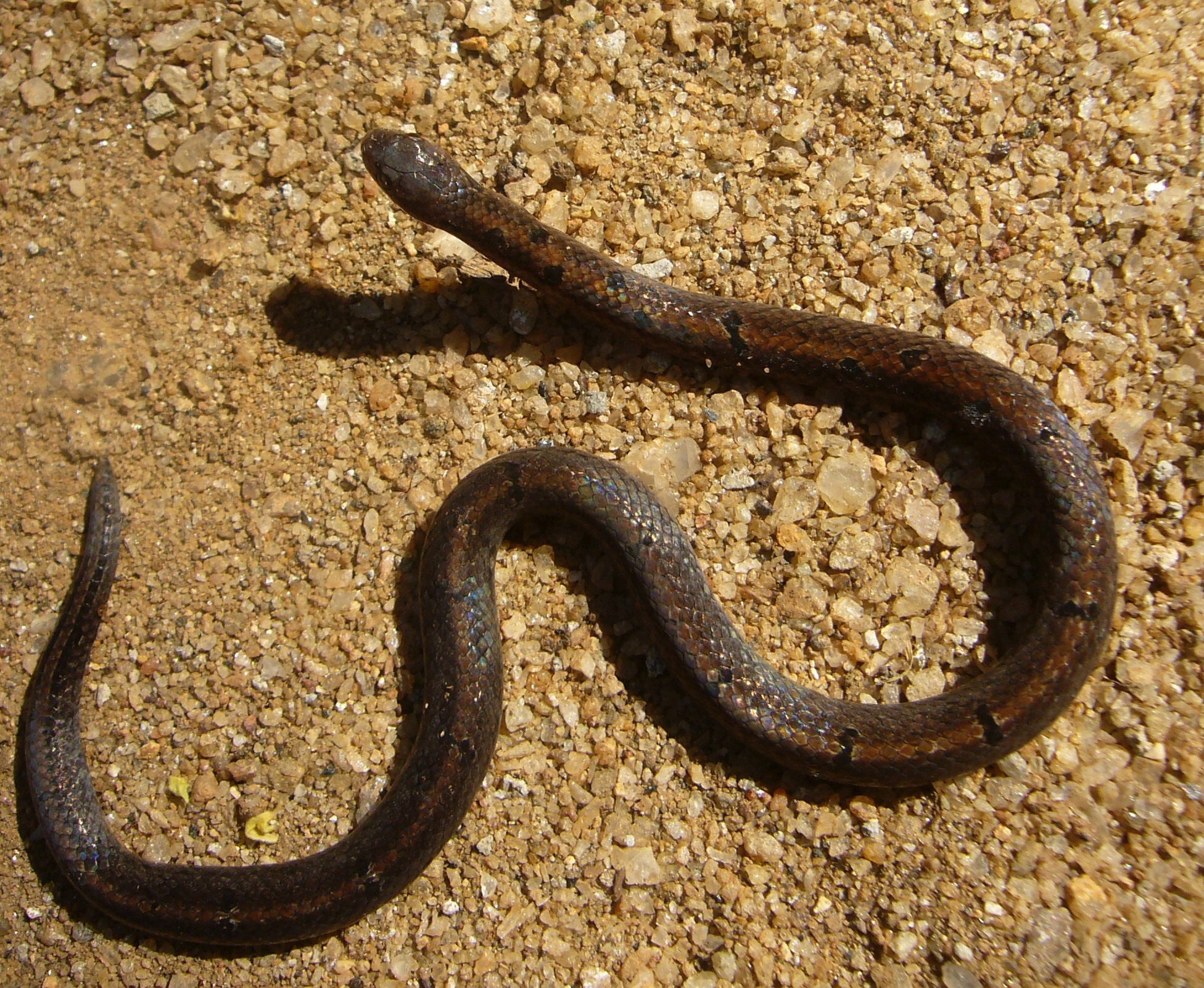
- Oligodon calamarius in Sri Lanka

Conservation status
- Endangered (IUCN 3.1)

Scientific classification
- Kingdom: Animalia
- Phylum: Chordata
- Class: Reptilia
- Order: Squamata
- Suborder: Serpentes
- Family: Colubridae
- Genus: Oligodon
- Species: O. calamarius

Binomial name
- Oligodon calamarius (Linnaeus, 1758)

Synonyms
- Coluber Calamarius Linnaeus, 1758; Oligodon templetonii Günther, 1862; Oligodon calamarius — M.A. Smith, 1943

= Oligodon calamarius =

Species of snake

Oligodon calamarius is a species of nonvenomous colubrid endemic to Sri Lanka. It is known as කබර දත්-කැටියා (kabara dath ketiya) in Sinhala.

== Etymology ==
Oligodon templetoni, now a junior synonym of Oligodon calamarius, was named in honour of Irish naturalist Dr. Robert Templeton who obtained the first known specimen.

== Description ==
O. calamarius is a terrestrial snake from lowlands of the wet zone, reaching montane limits, up to 1,800 m (5,900 ft). The head is short, scarcely distinct from the neck. The pupil of the eye is round. The dorsum is light brown with a light vertebral stripe. There are 18–24 narrow dark brown, light-edged cross-bands that are either complete or half-way cross the back. The venter is cream, with square black markings. The forehead has a dark crescentric marking and an elongated spot behind it.

== Distribution ==
O. calamarius is known from Udugama in the Southern Province, Hewissa and Mathugama in the Western Province, Ratnapura and Balangoda in the Sabaragamuwa Province, and Peradeniya in Central Province.
