= Wall's keelback =

Conservation status
- Near Threatened (IUCN 3.1)

Scientific classification
- Kingdom: Animalia
- Phylum: Chordata
- Class: Reptilia
- Order: Squamata
- Suborder: Serpentes
- Family: Colubridae
- Genus: Herpetoreas
- Species: H. xenura

Binomial name
- Herpetoreas xenura (Wall, 1907)

Synonyms
- Tropidonotus xenura Wall, 1907; Natrix xenurus – Wall, 1923; Natrix xenura – M.A. Smith, 1943; Paranatrix xenura – Mahendra, 1984; Amphiesma xenura – Das, 1996; Hebius xenura

Species of snake

Wall's keelback (Herpetoreas xenura) is a species of natricine snake endemic to Northeast India and Bangladesh .

== Geographic range ==
It is found in Khasi Hills in the Indian state of Meghalaya,. It is also found in Bangladesh and Myanmar.
