= Coluber karelini =

Spotted desert racer

Scientific classification
- Domain: Eukaryota
- Kingdom: Animalia
- Phylum: Chordata
- Class: Reptilia
- Order: Squamata
- Suborder: Serpentes
- Family: Colubridae
- Genus: Coluber
- Species: C. karelini

Binomial name
- Coluber karelini Brandt, 1838

Species of snake

Coluber karelini (spotted desert racer) is a species of snake found in West Asia and Central Asia.

== Distribution ==
Its distribution includes Pakistan, Iran (Kavir Desert), Afghanistan, southern Kazakhstan, Turkmenistan, Uzbekistan, Tajikistan, Kyrgyzstan, and Kashmir. The type locality is in western Turkmenistan.
