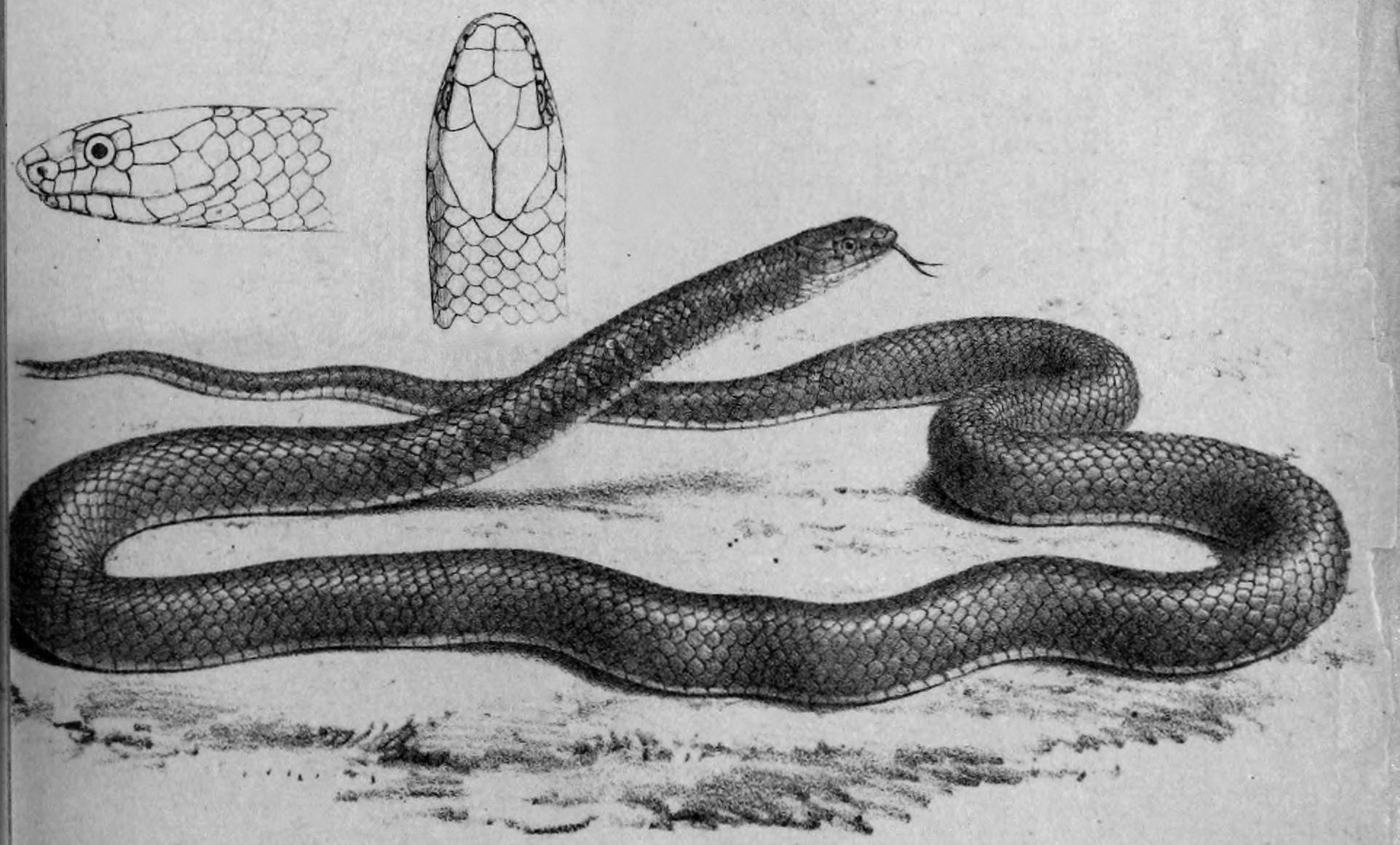
- Liopeltis rappi, adult

Conservation status
- Least Concern (IUCN 3.1)

Scientific classification
- Kingdom: Animalia
- Phylum: Chordata
- Class: Reptilia
- Order: Squamata
- Suborder: Serpentes
- Family: Colubridae
- Genus: Liopeltis
- Species: L. rappi

Binomial name
- Liopeltis rappi (Günther, 1860)

Synonyms
- Ablabes rappii Günther, 1860; Ablabes owenii Günther, 1860; Liopeltis rappi — Wall, 1924

= Liopeltis rappi =

Species of snake

Liopeltis rappi is a species of snake in the family Colubridae. The species is endemic to South Asia.

== Etymology ==
The specific name, rappi, is in honor of German naturalist Wilhelm Ludwig von Rapp.

== Geographic range ==
L. rappi is found in Nepal and India (Darjeeling, Himachal Pradesh, Sikkim).

== Taxonomy ==
Liopeltis rappi was originally described as a new species (Ablabes rappii ) by Günther in 1860, based on a single specimen which was "uniform blackish" dorsally. In the same scientific paper, Günther also described another new species (Ablabes owenii ), likewise based on a single specimen which was smaller and "greyish-brown" with a "black collar" and black crossbands anteriorly. After more specimens had been added to the collection of the British Museum, including some which were intermediate in size and colouration, Boulenger determined that "owenii " was a juvenile specimen of Liopeltis rappii.
