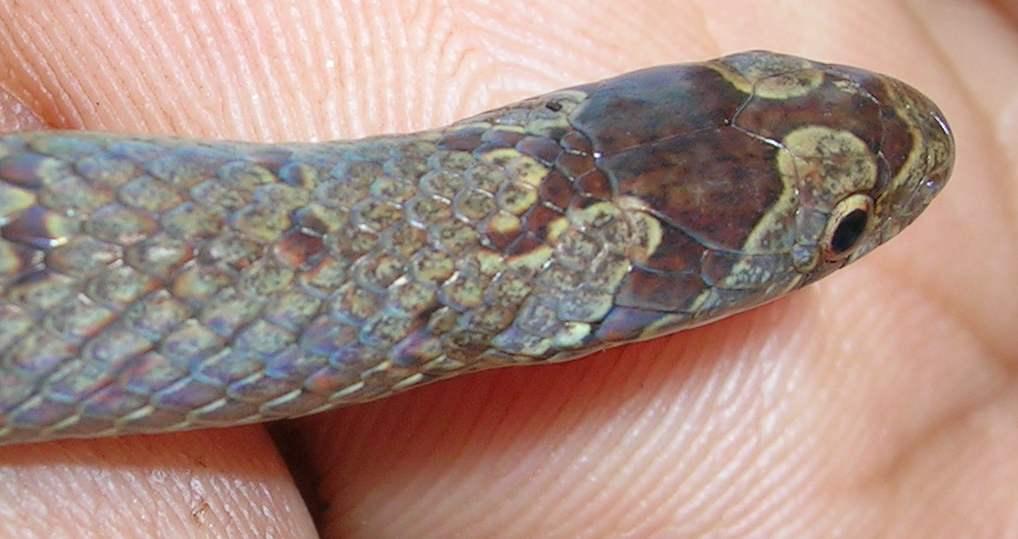
- Head
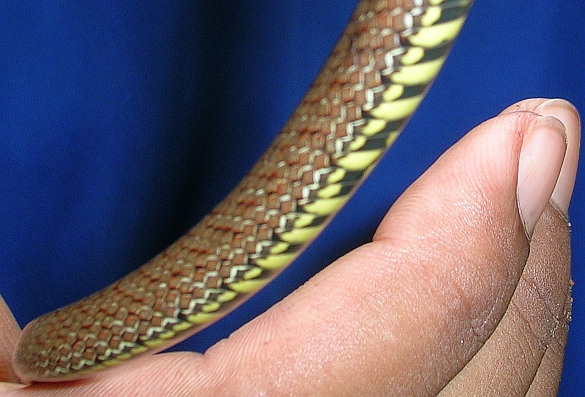
- Underside

Conservation status
- Least Concern (IUCN 3.1)

Scientific classification
- Kingdom: Animalia
- Phylum: Chordata
- Class: Reptilia
- Order: Squamata
- Suborder: Serpentes
- Family: Colubridae
- Genus: Oligodon
- Species: O. affinis

Binomial name
- Oligodon affinis Günther, 1862

= Western kukri =

Species of snake

The western kukri (Oligodon affinis) is a rear-fanged species of snake found mainly on the forest floor in the Western Ghats mountain range of India, usually south of the Goa Gap, a pass in the mountain range. The snakes are brown above with a dark brownish patch on the head that appears like a bird silhouette on the head. The underside is patterned in yellow and black.

== Scale pattern ==
See Snake scales for terminology used

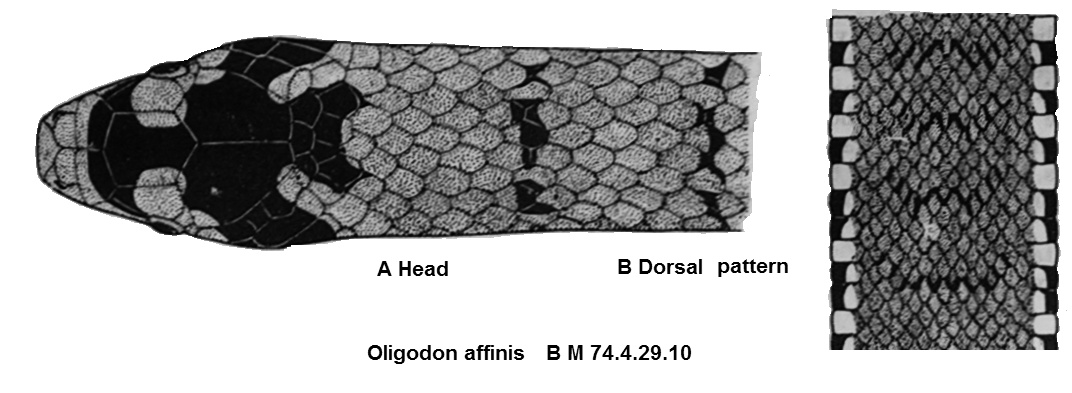
Head and dorsal markings

The average length of a fully grown western kukri is about 13 inches, with a two-inch tail. This snake is brown on top, with dark transverse lines over the top. The top of the head bears a dark symmetrical marking. Its lower surface is patterned in yellow (becoming white in spirit preserved specimens) with square black spots, both colours being distributed in nearly equal proportion. Like all snakes, they are most reliably identified by the pattern of scales. The scales of this species are smooth; there are 7 supralabial scales (along the upper lip), and 17 rows of dorsal scales. They have between 128 and 133 (in males), or 130 and 145 (in females), ventral scales. The anal scale is divided, and they have between 31 and 36 (in males), or 23 and 30 (in females) paired subcaudal scales.

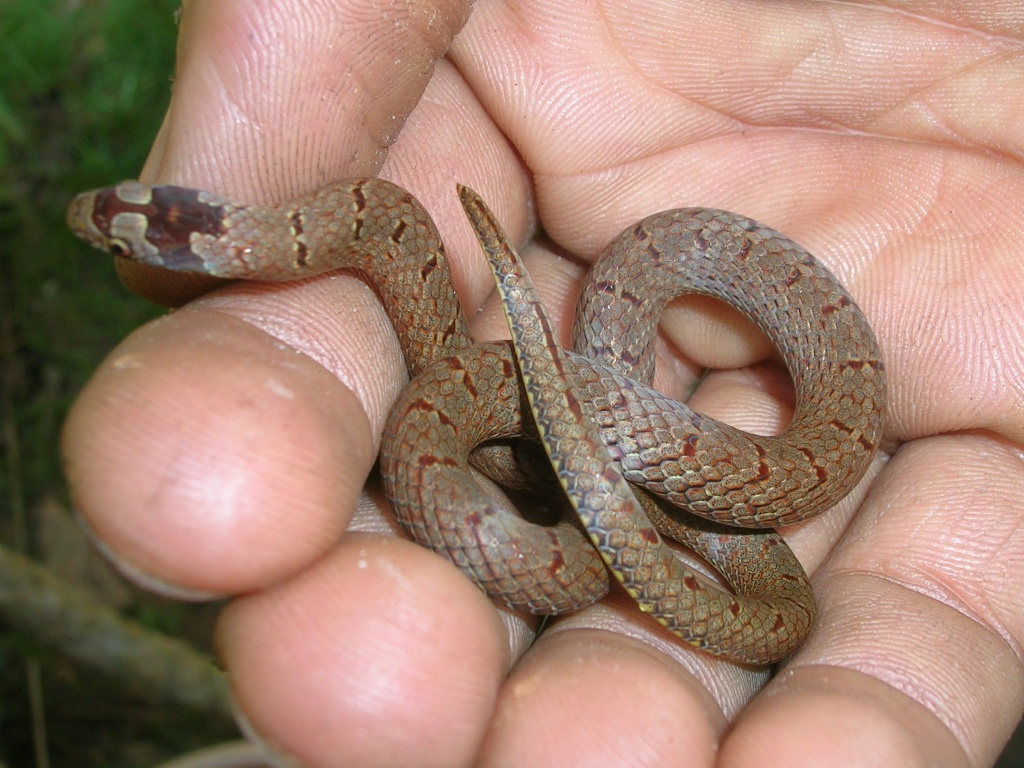
Young individual

The head of the snake has a divided nasal scale; the portion of rostral scale seen from above is half as long as its distance from the frontal scale, which itself is as long as the parietal scales (much longer than its distance from the end of the snout). The suture between the internasal scales is often as long as that between the prefrontal scales. Rather than a loreal scale the postnasal half of the divided nasal scale sometimes forms a suture with the preocular scale. They have one preocular scale and two postocular scales. They have one primary temporal and two secondary temporal scales (1+2) or one primary and secondary followed by a split tertiary temporal scale (1+1+2); of the seven supralabial scales the third and fourth touch the eye, the four sublabial scales are in contact with the anterior chin shields; the posterior chin shields are about two-thirds the length of the anterior.
