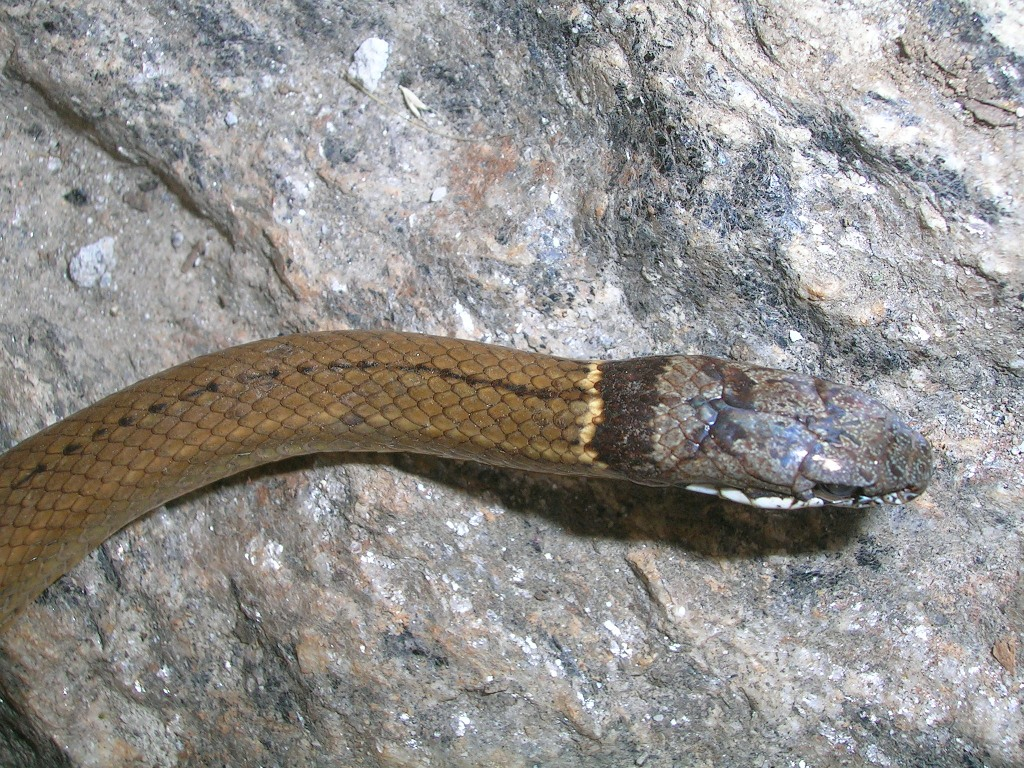

Conservation status
- Least Concern (IUCN 3.1)

Scientific classification
- Kingdom: Animalia
- Phylum: Chordata
- Class: Reptilia
- Order: Squamata
- Suborder: Serpentes
- Family: Colubridae
- Genus: Sibynophis
- Species: S. collaris

Binomial name
- Sibynophis collaris (Gray, 1853)

Synonyms
- Psammophis collaris Gray, 1853; Ablabes collaris – Günther, 1858; Polyodontophis collaris – Boulenger, 1890; Sibynophis collaris – M.A. Smith, 1943

= Sibynophis collaris =

Species of snake

Sibynophis collaris, commonly known as the common many-toothed snake, Betty's many toothed snake or the collared black-headed snake, is a species of colubrid snake endemic to South and East Asia.

== Description ==
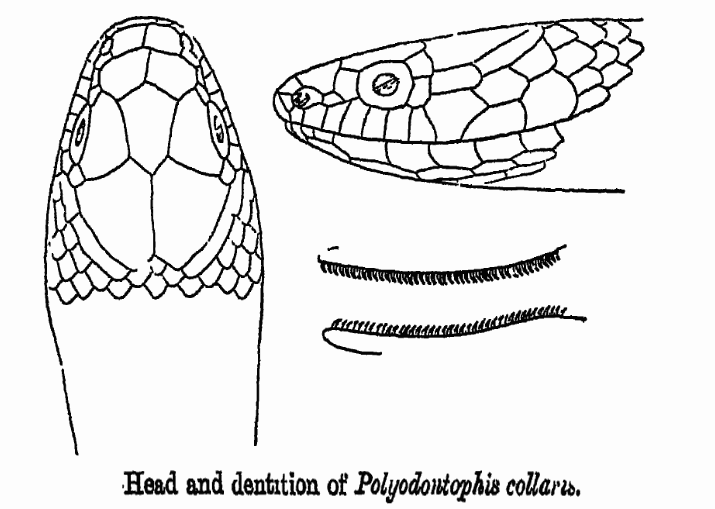

Rostral scale twice as broad as deep, just visible from above; suture between the internasals shorter than that between the prefrontals; frontal longer than its distance from the end of the snout, as long as the parietals or shorter; loreal as long as or a little longer than deep; one preocular; two postoculars, only the upper in contact with the parietal; temporals 1 (or 2) + 2; 9 or 10 upper labials, fourth, fifth, and sixth entering the eye; 4 lower labials in contact with the anterior chin shields, which are as long as the posterior chin shields. Dorsal scales smooth, without apical pits, in 17 rows. Ventrals 159–190; anal divided; subcaudals divided, 102–131.

Brown above, vertebral region greyish, usually with a series of small round black spots; head with small black spots or vermiculations above, and two black crossbands, one across the posterior part of the frontal and supraoculars, the other across the occiput; a large black nuchal spot or crossband, bordered with yellow posteriorly; a black line from the nostril to the nuchal spot, passing through the eye, bordering the white black-dotted upper lip. Lower parts yellowish, each ventral with an outer black spot or streak, which may be confluent on the posterior part of the body; anterior ventrals with a pair of median dots in addition.

Total length 29 inches (737 mm); tail 9.5 inches (241 mm).

== Distribution ==
India, Nepal, Bhutan, Bangladesh, Myanmar, Thailand, Laos, Vietnam, Cambodia?, West Malaysia, and China.

(Type locality: Khasi Hills, India)
