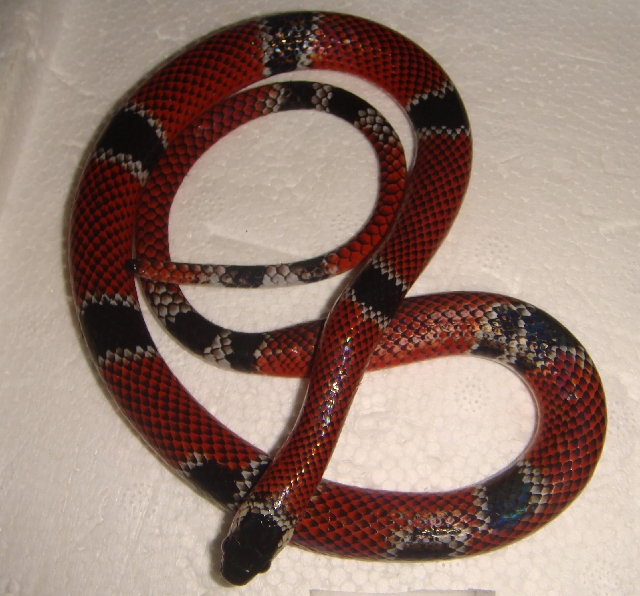
- Scaphiodontophis venustissimus

Scientific classification
- Kingdom: Animalia
- Phylum: Chordata
- Class: Reptilia
- Order: Squamata
- Suborder: Serpentes
- Family: Colubridae
- Subfamily: Sibynophiinae
- Genus: Scaphiodontophis; Taylor & H.M. Smith, 1943

= Scaphiodontophis =

Genus of snakes

Scaphiodontophis is a genus of snakes in the family Colubridae. The genus is native to Mexico, Central America, and Colombia.

== Species ==
The following two species are recognized as being valid.

- Scaphiodontophis annulatus (A.M.C. Duméril, Bibron & A.H.A. Duméril, 1854) – Guatemala neckband snake
- Scaphiodontophis venustissimus (Günther, 1893) – common neckband snake
