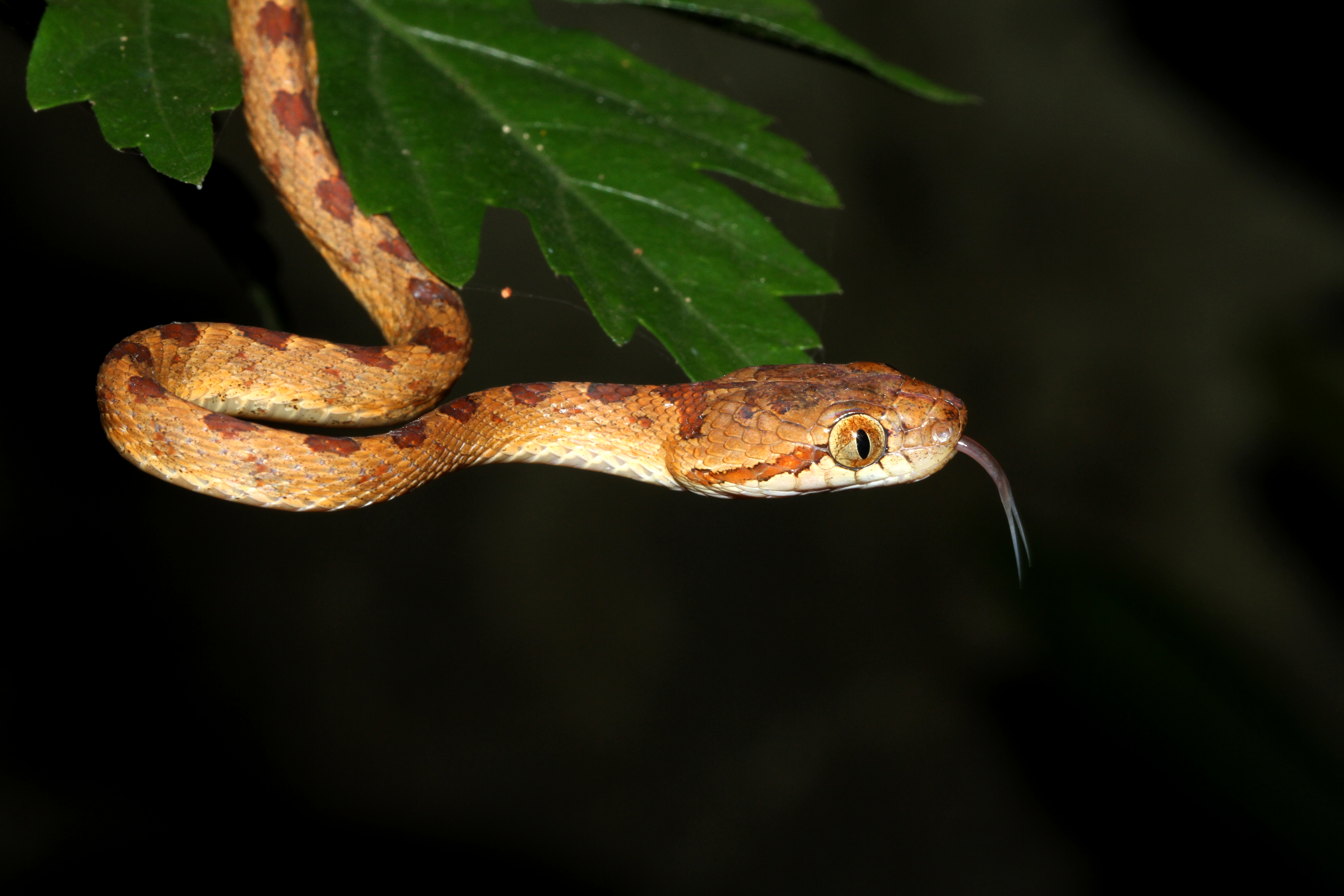

Conservation status
- Least Concern (IUCN 3.1)

Scientific classification
- Kingdom: Animalia
- Phylum: Chordata
- Class: Reptilia
- Order: Squamata
- Suborder: Serpentes
- Family: Colubridae
- Genus: Boiga
- Species: B. nuchalis

Binomial name
- Boiga nuchalis (Günther, 1875)

Synonyms
- Dipsas nuchalis Günther, 1875

= Boiga nuchalis =

Species of snake

The collared cat snake (Boiga nuchalis) is a species of nocturnal, tree-dwelling, rear-fanged colubrid snake endemic to southwestern India.

== Distribution ==
This is a species of wet hill forest tracts, mainly found along the Western Ghats (Agasthyamalai, High Wavy Mountains, Anaimalai, Nilgiris, Waynad, Coorg, Malnad region and Goa on to the Sahyadri range). Recently this species was also recorded in southern parts of the Eastern Ghats, in Tamil Nadu state (Sirumalai, Shevaroys, Kolli Hills, Melagiri and BR Hills). This species prefers low to mid-elevation hills (300–1200 m asl), occurring in tropical evergreen and moist deciduous forests.

== Morphology ==
Small to medium length, with a moderately long tail, reaching a maximum of about 1.2 meters. Head somewhat ovoid when viewed from above is distinct from neck with a rounded snout. Eyes are large in size with vertically elliptical pupils. Deep rusty brown with numerous, rich, reddish brown cross bars across. Underside creamy yellow densely powdered with brown spots. Dorsal scales smooth with single apical pits. The vertebral scale series is strongly enlarged. Ventral scales are laterally angulate. Dorsal scale count 21 (23) - 21 (23) - 15.

== Behavior ==
Nocturnal and arboreal. Occasionally seen on the ground searching for prey. Generally of a mild disposition, but has been observed to strike when approached or cornered. If the snake is provoked it will raise its fore body, coil into loops, often vibrating its tail and bites readily.

== Food ==
Especially feeds on Calotes but can eat tree frogs and geckos also, like other cat snake species.
