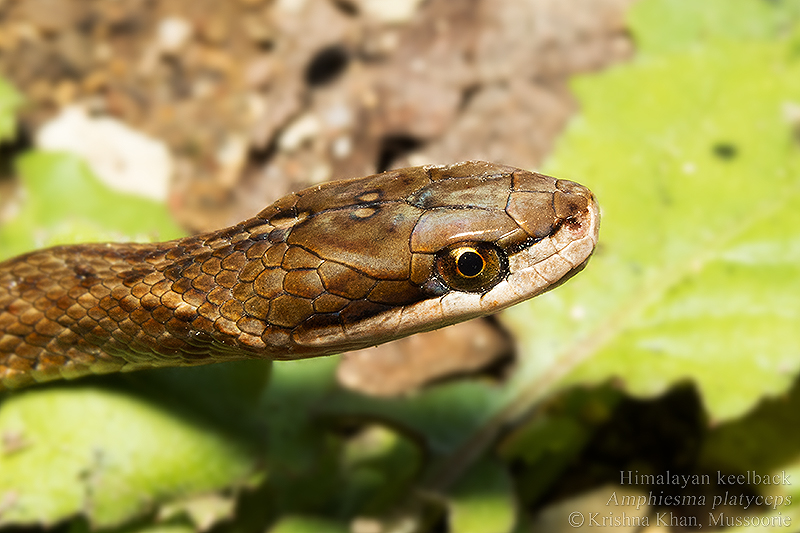
- Herpetoreas platyceps, at Mussoorie, India

Conservation status
- Least Concern (IUCN 3.1)

Scientific classification
- Kingdom: Animalia
- Phylum: Chordata
- Class: Reptilia
- Order: Squamata
- Suborder: Serpentes
- Family: Colubridae
- Genus: Herpetoreas
- Species: H. platyceps

Binomial name
- Herpetoreas platyceps (Blyth, 1854)

Synonyms
- Tropidonotus platyceps Blyth, 1854; Zamenis himalayanus Steindachner, 1867; Tropidonotus firthi Wall, 1914; Rhabdophis platyceps (Blyth, 1854) (Note: Wall, 1923); Natrix platyceps (Blyth, 1854) (Note: G.E. Shaw et al., 1939); Amphiesma platyceps (Blyth, 1854) (Note: Malnate, 1960); Herpetoreas platyceps (Blyth, 1854) (Note: Guo et al., 2014)

= Himalayan keelback =

Species of snake

The Himalayan keelback (Herpetoreas platyceps), also known commonly as the eastern keelback, is a species of snake in the subfamily Natricinae of the family Colubridae. The species is native to South Asia.

== Geographic range ==
Herpetoreas platyceps is known from India along the sub-Himalayan region, Nepal, Bangladesh, Pakistan, Bhutan and China, at elevations of 1,040–4,000 m (3,410–13,120 ft).

== Habitat ==
The preferred natural habitat of Herpetoreas platyceps is forest near water, but it has also been found in disturbed areas such as agricultural fields and villages.

== Description ==
Herpetoreas platyceps has the following characteristics: Eye moderate; rostral just visible from above; suture between the internasals as long as that between the prefrontals or shorter; frontal longer than its distance from the end of the snout, shorter than the parietals; loreal longer than deep; one preocular (sometimes divided); two or three postoculars; temporals 1+1, or 1+2, or 2+2; 8 upper labials, third, fourth, and fifth entering the eye; 4 or 5 lower labials in contact with the anterior chin shields, which are much shorter than the posterior chin shields.

Dorsal scales in 19 rows, faintly or feebly keeled. 177-235 ventrals; anal divided; subcaudals 75–107, also divided.

Olive-brown above, with small black spots; frequently two black parallel lines or an elliptic marking on the nape; a light, black-edged streak on each side of the head, or a black line from eye to gape (corner of mouth); belly yellowish, with or without blackish dots; frequently a black line or series of elongate blackish spots along each side of the belly; lower surface of tail frequently mottled with blackish; throat sometimes black. In life, a coral-red band is said to run along the ends of the ventrals.

Total length 90 cm (3 feet); tail 23 cm (9 inches).

== Behavior ==
Herpetoreas platyceps is terrestrial, and it is active in the evening.

== Diet ==
Herpetoreas platyceps preys upon a variety of small vertebrates, including fishes, frogs and their tadpoles, lizards, snakes and their eggs, birds, and mammals.

== Reproduction ==
Herpetoreas platyceps is oviparous. Clutch size is 4–12 eggs. Each egg measures 8 mm × 25 mm (0.31 in × 0.98 in).
