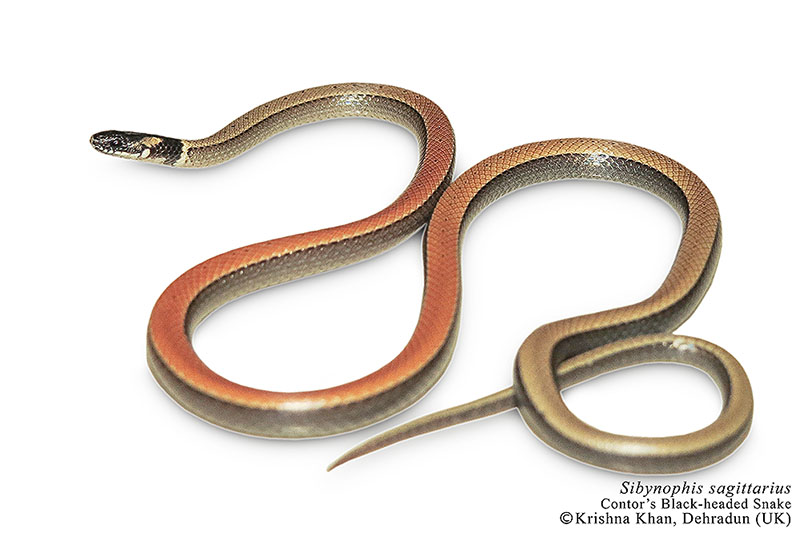
- Specimen from Uttarakhand

Conservation status
- Least Concern (IUCN 3.1)

Scientific classification
- Kingdom: Animalia
- Phylum: Chordata
- Class: Reptilia
- Order: Squamata
- Suborder: Serpentes
- Family: Colubridae
- Genus: Sibynophis
- Species: S. sagittarius

Binomial name
- Sibynophis sagittarius (Cantor, 1839)

Synonyms
- Calamaria sagittaria Cantor, 1839; Ablabes sagittarius – Günther, 1864; Polyodontophis sagittarius – Boulenger, 1890; Sibynophis sagittarius – M.A. Smith, 1943; Sibynophis sagittaria [sic] – Das, 1996

= Sibynophis sagittarius =

Species of snake

Sibynophis sagittarius, commonly known as Cantor's black-headed snake after Theodore Cantor, is a species of snake endemic to South Asia.

== Geographic range ==
It is found in central and northeastern India, Bhutan, Nepal, and Pakistan. It is uncertain whether the species occurs or has occurred in Bangladesh.

== Description ==
Adults may attain 28 cm (11 in) in total length, with a tail 6 cm (2.4 in) long.

As the common name implies, the dorsal surface of the head, including the nape of the neck, is black or dark brown, followed by a thin yellow nuchal collar. Also, there are two large elongate yellowish spots, one on each side of the back of the head. The upper surface of the body is pale brown, and the sides of the body are darker brown or gray. On each flank there is a thin black stripe separating the differently colored areas. A series of small black dots, widely separated, run down the vertebral row of dorsal scales. The underside is yellow, with a black dot at each outer end of every ventral.

The smooth dorsal scales, which lack apical pits, are arranged in 17 rows. Ventrals 205–228; anal plate divided; subcaudals 56–70, divided (paired).

== Habitat ==
Sibynophis sagittarius is found in forests.

== Behavior ==
It is not arboreal, but rather hunts by day on the forest floor.

== Diet ==
It feeds on insects, frogs, skinks, and snakes.

== Reproduction ==
An oviparous species, it lays a clutch of as many as six eggs.
