= William Lutley Sclater =

British ornithologist (1863–1944)

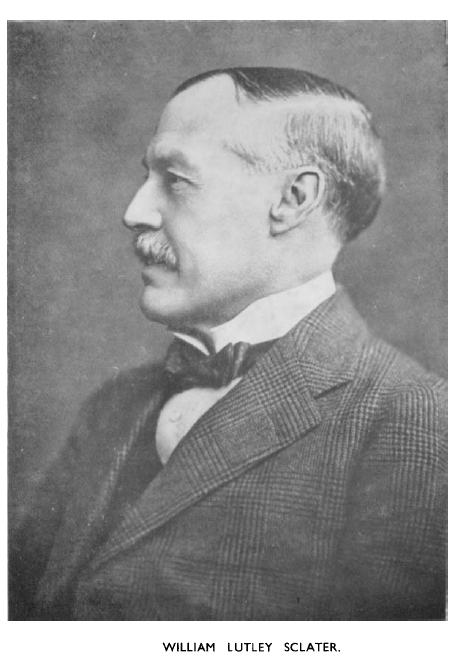
- Born: 23 September 1863
- Died: 4 July 1944 (aged 80); St. George's Hospital, London
- Education: Keble College
- Occupations: zoologist; museum director
- Spouse: Charlotte Mellen Stephenson
- Parent(s): Philip Lutley Sclater, Jane Anne Eliza Hunter-Blair

William Lutley Sclater (23 September 1863 – 4 July 1944) was a British zoologist and museum director. He was the son of Philip Lutley Sclater and was named after his paternal grandfather, also William Lutley Sclater.

== Life ==
William's mother, Jane Anne Eliza, was the daughter of Sir David Hunter-Blair, 3rd Baronet, and a sister-in-law of Sir Walter Elliot the Indian naturalist. Sclater received his Master of Arts degree in Natural Science from Keble College at Oxford in 1885. He worked for two years as a Demonstrator at Cambridge under Professor Adam Sedgwick and went on a collecting trip to British Guiana in 1886. He published about birds in The Ibis in 1887. In the same year, he received an appointment as a deputy superintendent of the Indian Museum in Calcutta from 1887 until 1891, when he joined the science faculty of Eton College.

It was at Eton that he met his future wife, Charlotte Mellen Stephenson, an American divorcée whose two sons attended the school. The couple were married at St George's, Hanover Square on 1 February 1896, shortly after which they moved to Cape Town, South Africa. Here, Sclater took up the position of curator at the South African Museum, whose collections he reorganized and moved into a new facility. During his time in South Africa, he continued his scientific writings, including completion of the work Flora and Fauna of South Africa. He also completed the four-volume series The Birds of South Africa, begun by Dr Arthur Stark; the five-volume Birds of Africa, begun by Captain George Shelley; and The Birds of Kenya Colony and the Uganda Protectorate, begun by Sir Frederick John Jackson.

In 1906, following a dispute with the museum's board of trustees, Sclater resigned as curator. He travelled with his wife through Mombasa, Lake Victoria, Khartoum, and Cairo before returning to England. He then moved to Colorado Springs, Colorado, which had been founded by Charlotte's brother-in-law, General William Jackson Palmer. Palmer offered Sclater a small estate outside the city and a professorship at Colorado College. Here, he helped in reorganizing the museum. When the general died in 1909, the couple returned to England.

From 1909 Sclater became curator of the Bird Room at the Natural History Museum. While working there he compiled the Systema Avium Aethiopicarum (1924–1930), a scholarly work that assisted further research. He worked there until his death in 1944.

In 1912, Sclater published A History of the Birds of Colorado in two volumes. During the Great War, he volunteered for the Soldiers' and Sailors' Families Association. Both his stepsons were killed in action during the war:

- Captain Eric Seymour Stephenson died on 6 May 1915, aged 36, while serving with the 1st Battalion Gloucestershire Regiment (attached as Landing Staff Officer to Sir Ian Hamilton's Staff). He was wounded on 26 April while directing landing operations from the SS River Clyde during the Gallipoli Campaign and died of wounds on board the hospital ship Sicilia. He was awarded a DSO and was mentioned in despatches. He served in the Second Boer War and was attached for many years to the Egyptian Army. He is buried in the Ta' Braxia Cemetery on Malta.
- Second Lieutenant Cyril Seymour Stephenson died on 6 December 1916, aged 37, while serving with the 9th Queen's Royal Lancers. He is buried in the northeast corner of the old ground of St Alban's churchyard in Frant.

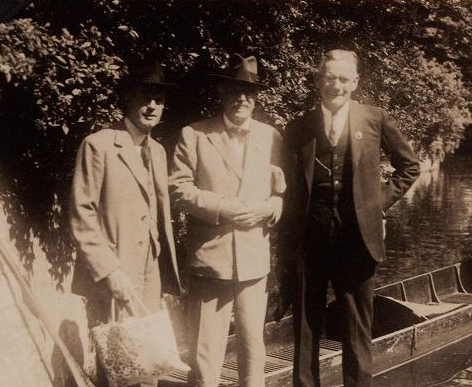
Left to right – Percy Lowe, Sclater and Alexander Wetmore in 1934

Sclater was editor of the quarterly journal Ibis from 1913 to 1930, editor of The Zoological Record from 1921 to 1937, president of the British Ornithologists' Union from 1928 to 1933, and secretary of the Royal Geographical Society from 1931 to 1943. In 1919 and 1920, he and his wife travelled around the globe. In 1930, he was awarded the Godman-Salvin Gold Medal.

In 1942, Charlotte died of injuries sustained during the bombing of London. Two years later, William Sclater died at St. George's Hospital, two days after a V-1 flying bomb fell over his home at 10 Sloane Court in Chelsea on Sunday, 2 July 1944.

Known mainly for his work with birds, Sclater also described several new species of amphibians and reptiles. Four new snakes were described by him in a single paper in 1891. Enuliophis sclateri Boulenger 1894 is a snake species named after his father Philip Sclater.

Preceded by Lord Lionel Walter Rothschild	President of the British Ornithologists' Union; 1928–1933	Succeeded by Harry Witherby
