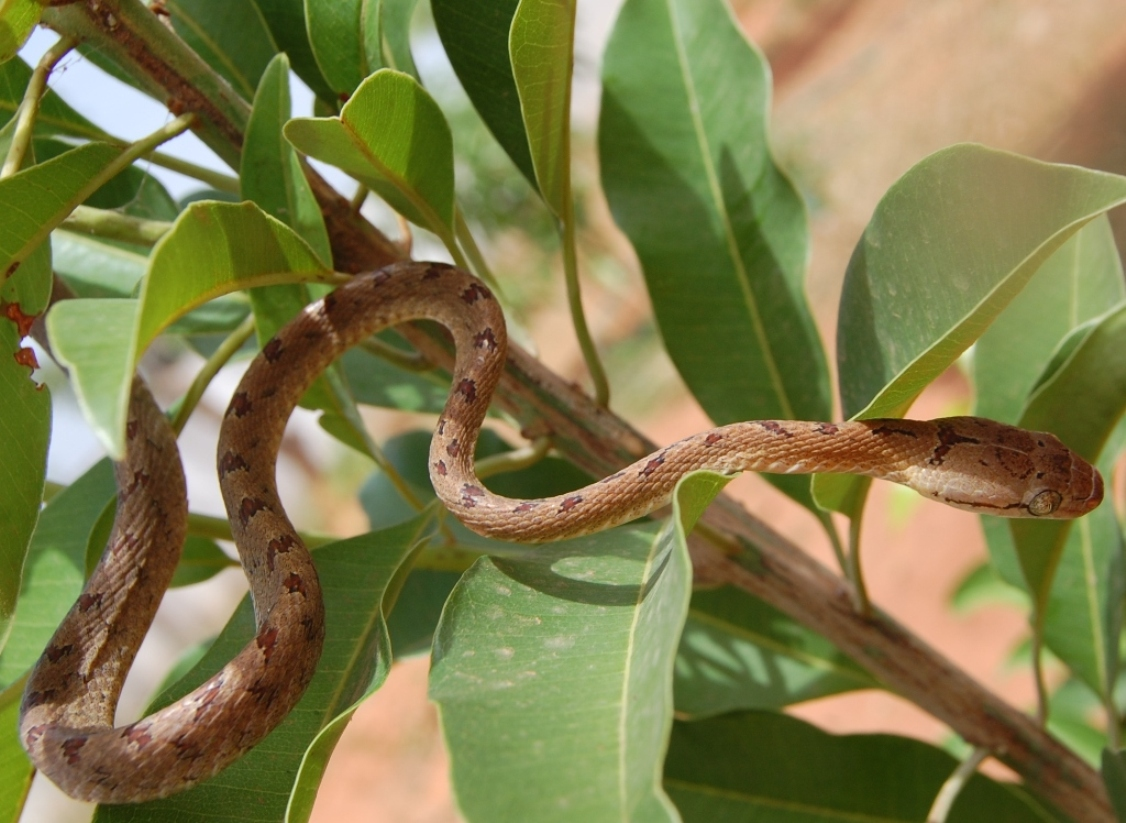
- Adult Whitaker's cat snake (Boiga dightoni whitakeri) from Tirunevlei hills Tamil Nadu

Scientific classification
- Kingdom: Animalia
- Phylum: Chordata
- Class: Reptilia
- Order: Squamata
- Suborder: Serpentes
- Family: Colubridae
- Genus: Boiga
- Species: B. dightoni
- Subspecies: B. d. whitakeri

Trinomial name
- Boiga dightoni whitakeri Ganesh, Mallik, Achyuthan, Shanker & Vogel 2021

= Boiga dightoni whitakeri =

Species of snake

Boiga dightoni whitakeri, or Whitaker's cat snake, is a subspecies of nocturnal, arboreal, opisthoglyphous snake of the family Colubridae. It is endemic to the Western Ghats of South India, in Kerala and Tamil Nadu states.

== Etymology ==
Whitaker's cat snake is named after the renowned Indian herpetologist Romulus Whitaker, who is the pioneer of Indian reptile conservation and education.

== History of discovery ==
During a recent study (2021), a Boiga population from the Western Ghats of Tamil Nadu and Kerala was discovered and was found to be closely related to another species the Ceylon cat snake, Boiga ceylonensis endemic to Sri Lanka. Thus it was described as new to science and was named Boiga whitakeri. In 2023, it was considered to be a subspecies of Boiga dightoni.

== Type specimens ==
Holotype BNHS 3597 (ex. CESS 255) an adult male from the type locality Devar Mala. Paratype BNHS 1863 coll. K.G. Adiyodi from "Pullompara" in Ernakulam district, Kerala.

== Identification features ==
A species of Boiga occurring in the Western Ghats, having 19 midbody scale rows; ventrals 235–243; subcaudals 88–98; a creamy brown dorsum with orange transverse streaks; crown with faint markings; ventrolateral pattern composed of small brown dots; phylogenetically delineated as a species, sister to B. ceylonensis of Sri Lanka.

== Distribution & natural history ==
Boiga dightoni whitakeri is a nocturnal, arboreal snake actively seen foraging on bushes and trees at night. This species is endemic to the Western Ghats of South India. It has been recorded in Tamil Nadu and Kerala states, from areas such as Devar Mala, Courtallam, Agasthyamalai and Idukki district, i.e., the erstwhile Eranakulam Province.
