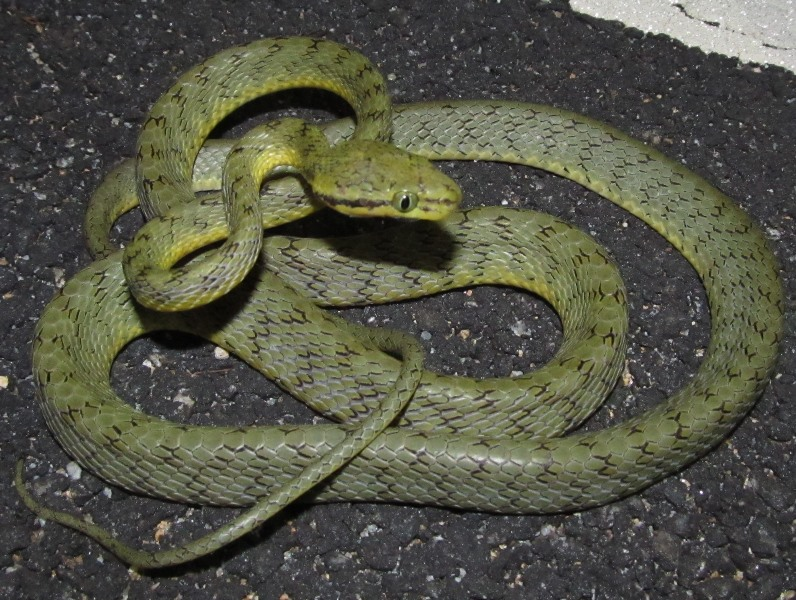

Conservation status
- Least Concern (IUCN 3.1)

Scientific classification
- Kingdom: Animalia
- Phylum: Chordata
- Class: Reptilia
- Order: Squamata
- Suborder: Serpentes
- Family: Colubridae
- Genus: Boiga
- Species: B. flaviviridis

Binomial name
- Boiga flaviviridis Vogel & Ganesh, 2013

= Boiga flaviviridis =

Species of snake

Boiga flaviviridis, the yellow-green cat snake, is a species of mildly venomous, rear-fanged snake of the family Colubridae, which is found in India. It is a rear fanged, nocturnal, arboreal species of snake that probably feeds on lizards, frogs and small birds. It was first described in 2013.

== Taxonomic comments ==
Till a recent study, this species was mistaken to be Beddome's cat snake and was extralimitally reported from dry forests of eastern peninsular India. New research on both museum collections and fieldwork led to its discovery as a new, distinct species.

Holotype: BMNH 1911.9.8.4, female, from Brahmapur Ganjam district, in Odisha state, India, presented by Major Frank Wall in 1911.

Paratype: MAD 1913 an adult female from Udayagiri, Nellore district, state of Andhra Pradesh, India, collected in 1913, collector unknown.

== Etymology ==
This species is named flaviviridis (from flavus meaning yellow and viridis, meaning green in Latin) as an adjective, after its diagnostic colouration that easily serves to identify this species. As a common name, "yellow-green cat snake" was suggested.

== Diagnostics ==
The new species can be identified as follows: medium-sized species of the genus Boiga characterized by: (1) 19 dorsal scale rows around the forepart of the body and 19 dorsal scale rows at midbody; (2) 248–259 ventrals; (3) 106–109 subcaudals in females; (4) a single anal scale; (5) 8 (rarely 9) supralabials with SL 3–5 touching the orbit; (6) preocular reaching upper surface of the head; (7) 2 temporals in the first row, 3 temporals in the second row with a total of 4 rows of temporal scales; (8) a yellowish-green dorsal ground colour; (9) more than 90 faint, hardly visible dark bands; (10) the dorsal part of the head with only faint ornamentations; (11) a postocular stripe ending at the jaw angle; (12) a uniform venter with no speckles or lines (13) relative tail length in females from 0.180 to 0.200. The new species can easily be recognized by the combination of high number of ventral scales together with the colouration especially the uniform belly and a proportionately shorter tail than in other species of this group.

== Geographic range ==
This species of snake is found in India. It is so far known from the dry forests of eastern peninsular India, including Andhra Pradesh, Karnataka, Tamil Nadu, Telangana, Kerala and Odisha states.
