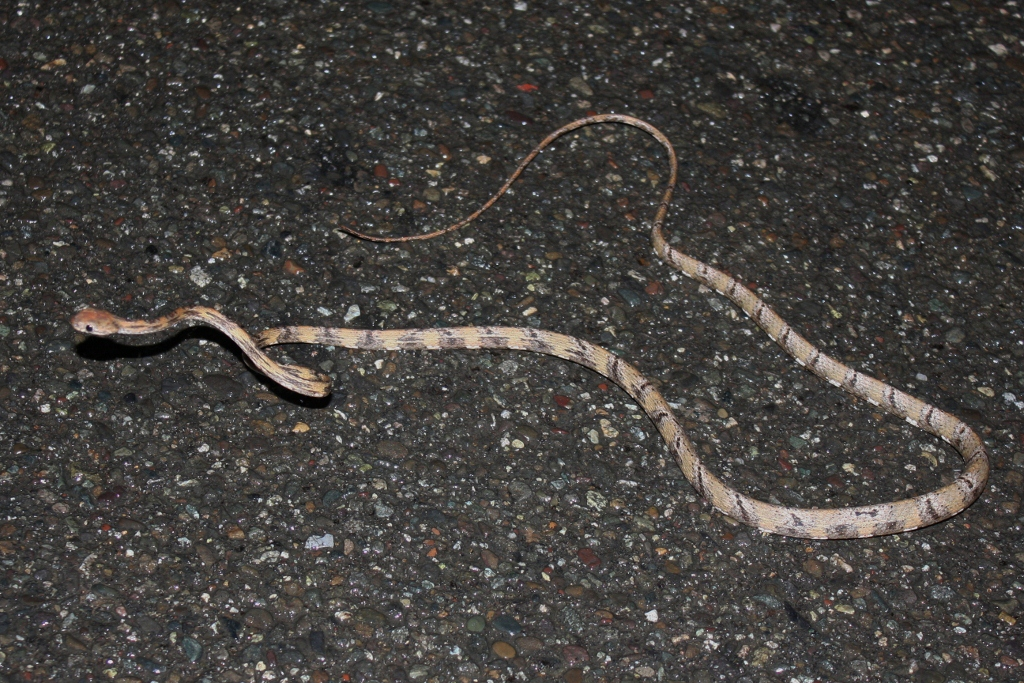

Conservation status
- Least Concern (IUCN 3.1)

Scientific classification
- Kingdom: Animalia
- Phylum: Chordata
- Class: Reptilia
- Order: Squamata
- Suborder: Serpentes
- Family: Colubridae
- Genus: Boiga
- Species: B. schultzei

Binomial name
- Boiga schultzei Taylor, 1923

Synonyms
- Boiga schultzei Taylor, 1923; Boiga drapiezii schultzei — Welch, 1988; Boiga schultzei — Greene, 1989; Boiga drapiezii schultzei — Gaulke, 1994; Boiga schultzei — Orlov et al., 2003

= Boiga schultzei =

Species of snake

Boiga schultzei, commonly known as the Schultze's blunt-headed tree snake, is a species of snake in the family Colubridae. The species is endemic to the Philippines.

== Etymology ==
The specific name, schultzei, is in honor of Willie Schultze in whose private collection E.H. Taylor found the specimen which would become the holotype.

== Geographic range ==
B. schultzei is found on the island of Palawan, Philippines.

== Habitat ==
The preferred natural habitat of B. schultzei is forest, at altitudes from sea level to 200 m (660 ft).

== Description ==
B. schultzei may attain a snout-to-vent length (SVL) of 1.04 m (3.4 ft), plus a tail 0.37 m (1.2 ft) long.

== Diet ==
B. schultzei preys upon lizards, such as the gecko Gehyra mutilata.

== Reproduction ==
B. schultzei is oviparous.
