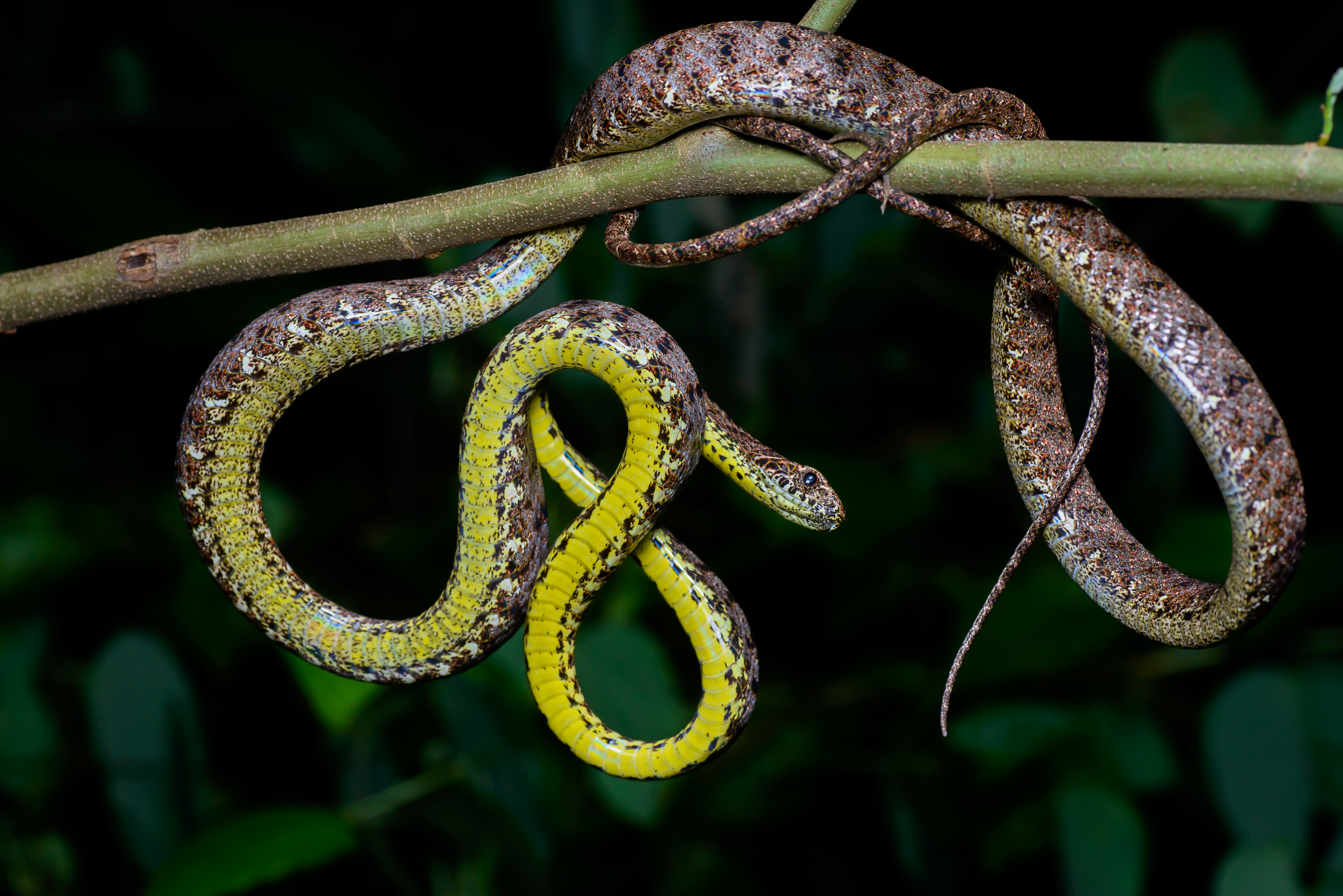
- At Khao Luang National Park

Conservation status
- Least Concern (IUCN 3.1)

Scientific classification
- Kingdom: Animalia
- Phylum: Chordata
- Class: Reptilia
- Order: Squamata
- Suborder: Serpentes
- Family: Colubridae
- Genus: Boiga
- Species: B. jaspidea

Binomial name
- Boiga jaspidea (Duméril, Bibron & Duméril, 1854)
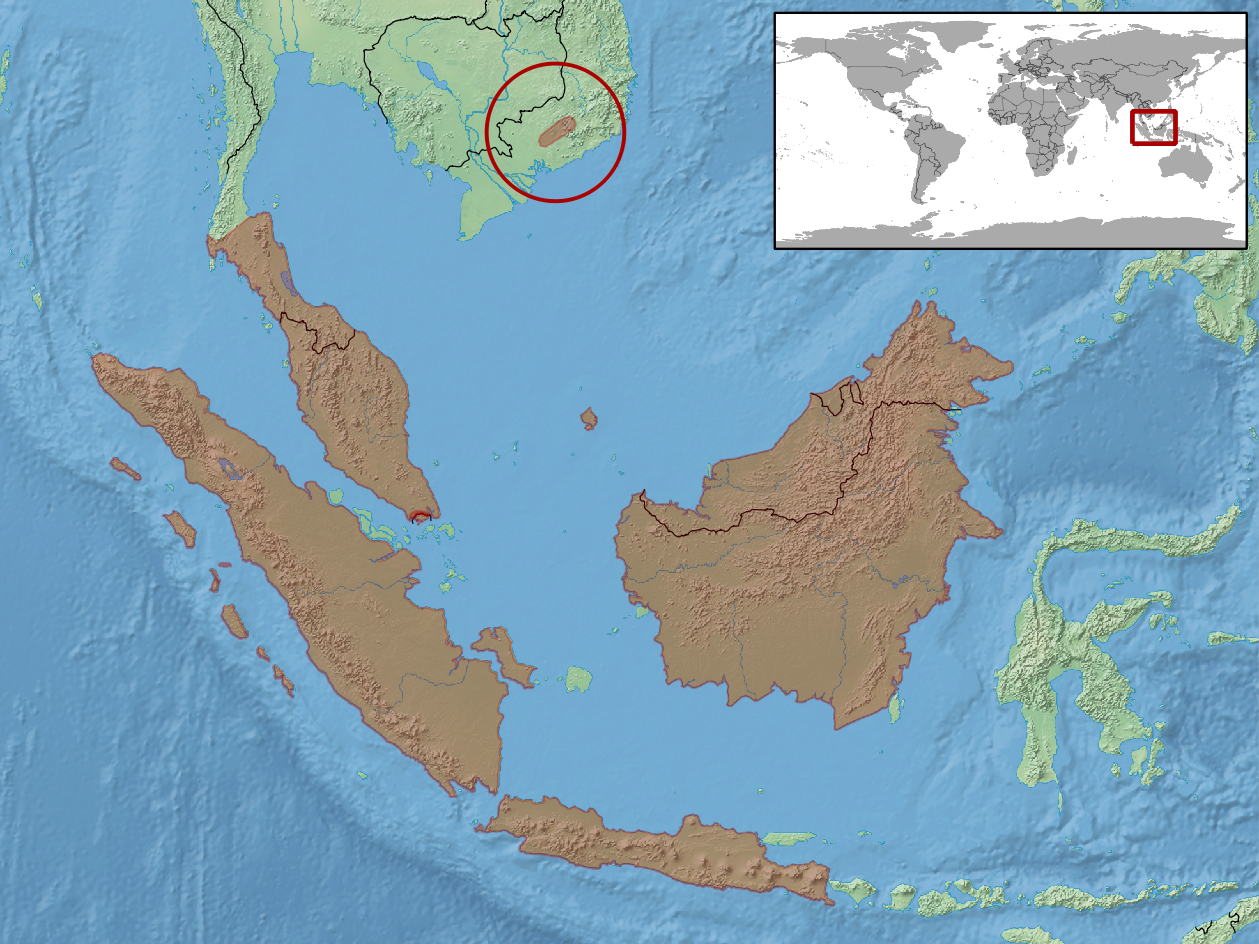

Synonyms
- Triglyphodon jaspideum Duméril, Bibron & Duméril, 1854; Dipsas jaspidea Jan, 1863; Dipsadomorphus jaspideus Boulenger, 1896

= Boiga jaspidea =

Species of snake

Boiga jaspidea, commonly known as the jasper cat snake, is a species of rear-fanged colubrid that is uncommon throughout its range.

== Description ==
Its small and slender body is reddish to chocolate brown, but rich black and white speckles cover the entire body except for the ventrals, which are yellow. In addition, there are faint black lateral bars, and white spots on the ventrolateral area. Its maximum length is 1.5 m (4.9 feet).

== Geographic range ==
Indonesia, Borneo, Peninsular Malaysia, Thailand and southern Vietnam.

== Habitat and behavior ==
The jasper cat snake lives in arboreal habitats in tropical forests, and sometimes among low-lying shrubs. It has been reported to lay up to three eggs in termite nests. Little else is known about this elusive snake.

== Diet ==
The jasper cat snake feeds on geckos and other smaller snakes in the wild.
