= Boiga angulata =

Conservation status
- Least Concern (IUCN 3.1)

Scientific classification
- Kingdom: Animalia
- Phylum: Chordata
- Class: Reptilia
- Order: Squamata
- Suborder: Serpentes
- Family: Colubridae
- Genus: Boiga
- Species: B. angulata

Binomial name
- Boiga angulata (Peters, 1861)

Species of snake

Boiga angulata, commonly known as the Leyte cat snake or Philippine blunt-headed tree snake, is a species of rear-fanged snake in the family Colubridae. The species is endemic to the Philippines. It is considered mildly venomous. This snake feeds on birds and eggs as well as flying lizards and geckoes.

== Geographic range ==
The snake is found in the Philippines.

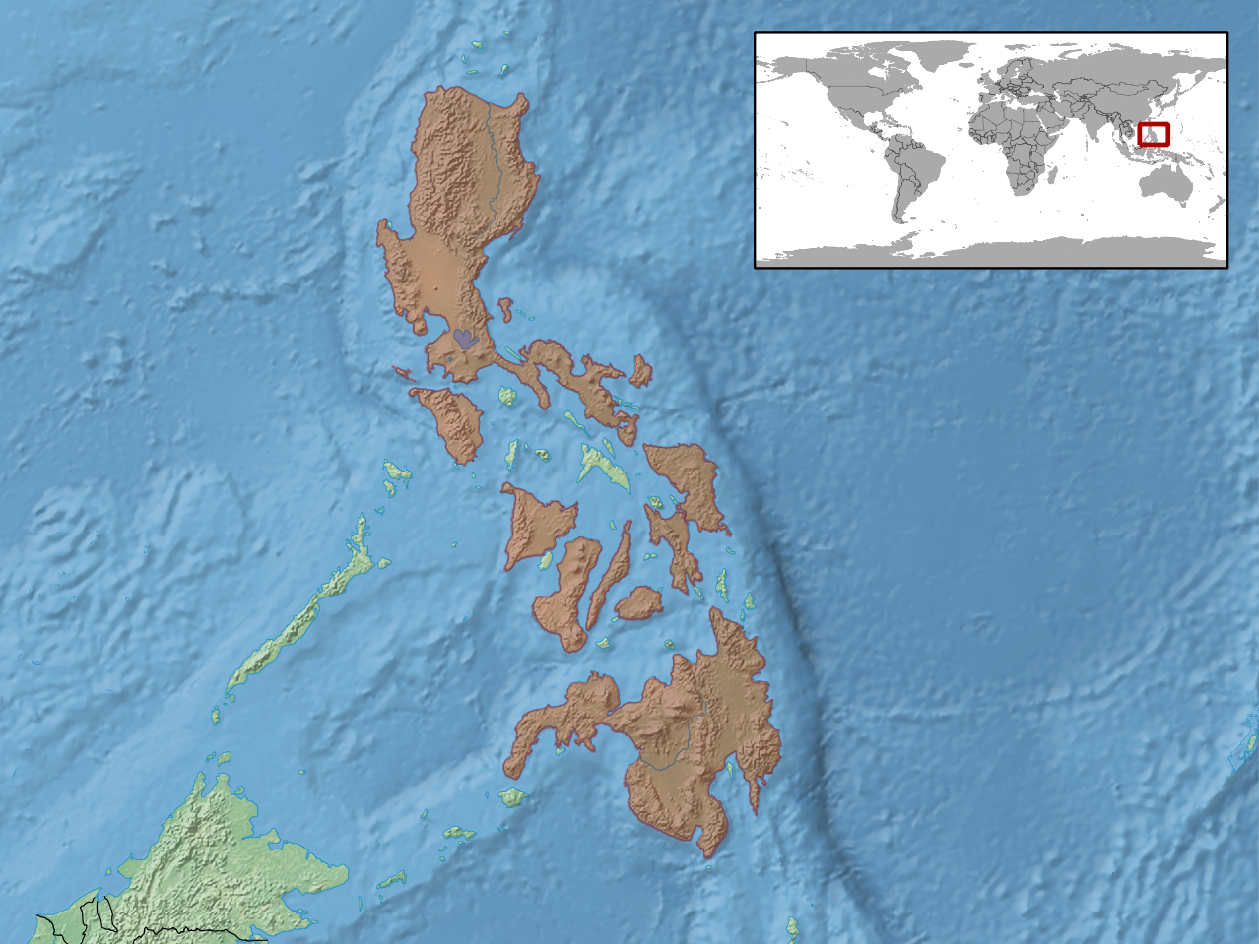
Distribution of Boiga angulata.
