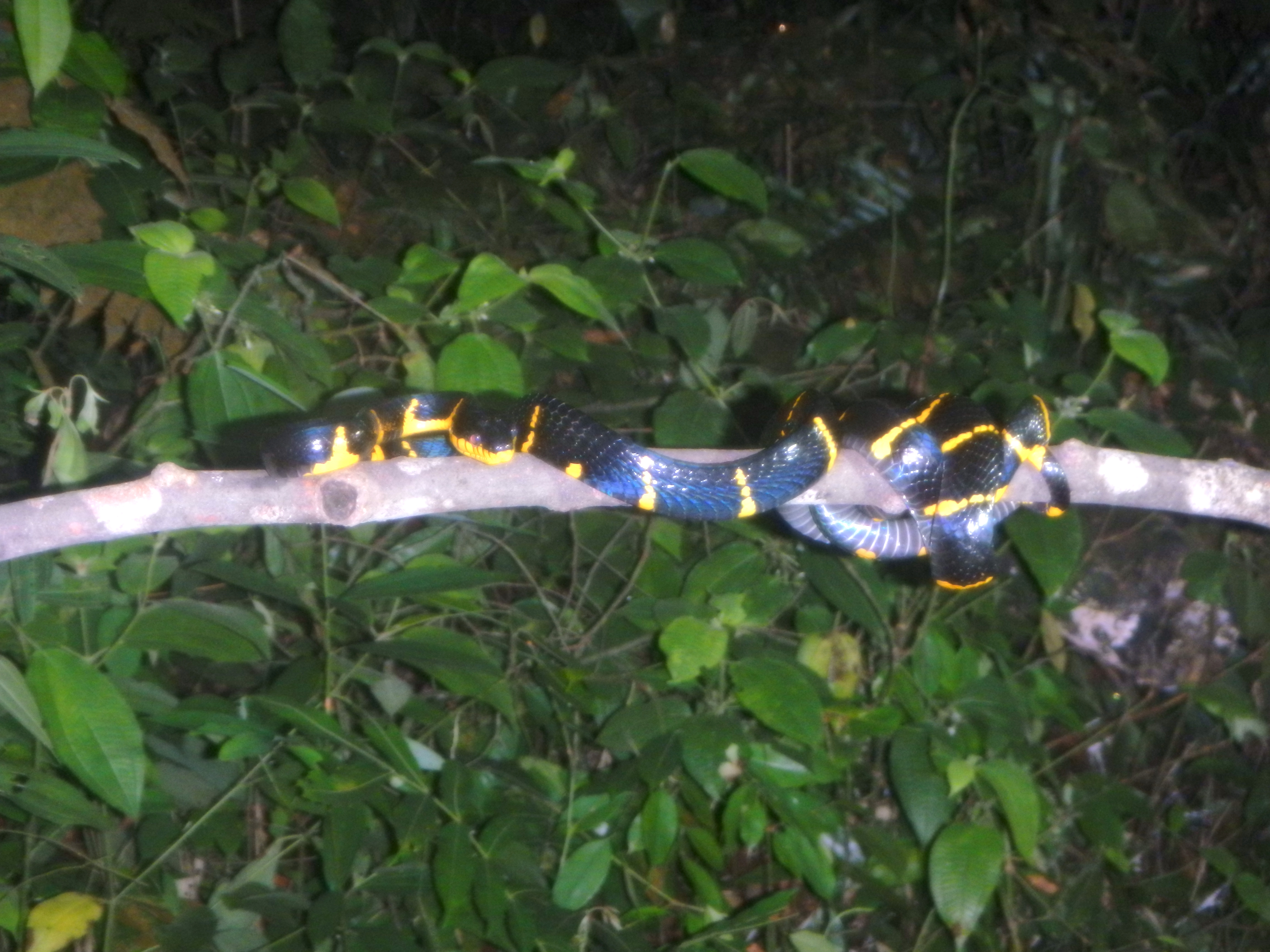
- Mangrove catsnake (Boiga melanota) in lowland dipterocarp forest (Bukit Lagong, Selangor)

Scientific classification
- Kingdom: Animalia
- Phylum: Chordata
- Class: Reptilia
- Order: Squamata
- Suborder: Serpentes
- Family: Colubridae
- Genus: Boiga
- Species: B. melanota

Binomial name
- Boiga melanota (Boulenger, 1896)

Synonyms
- Boiga dendrophila melanota

= Boiga melanota =

Western mangrove cat snake

Boiga melanota, the western mangrove cat snake, is one of the biggest cat snake species in Asia. It is found in Thailand, West Malaysia, Singapore, and Indonesia (Sumatra). It is shiny bluish black in colour, marked with 40-50 yellow stripes. The mouth and throat area are yellow, whereas the ventral part of the body is yellowish black. The eyes are greyish in colour. It is categorised as a mildly venomous snake.

== Habits ==
An adult mangrove snake can reach a length of 2.5 metres (8 ft 2 in). It is active at night (nocturnal) and hunts for birds, rats and birds eggs as its main diet. Its large head and mouth enables it to swallows its prey easily. Recently reclassed from within the Dendrophila family, they share some physical traits such as similar colouring and being rear-fanged.
