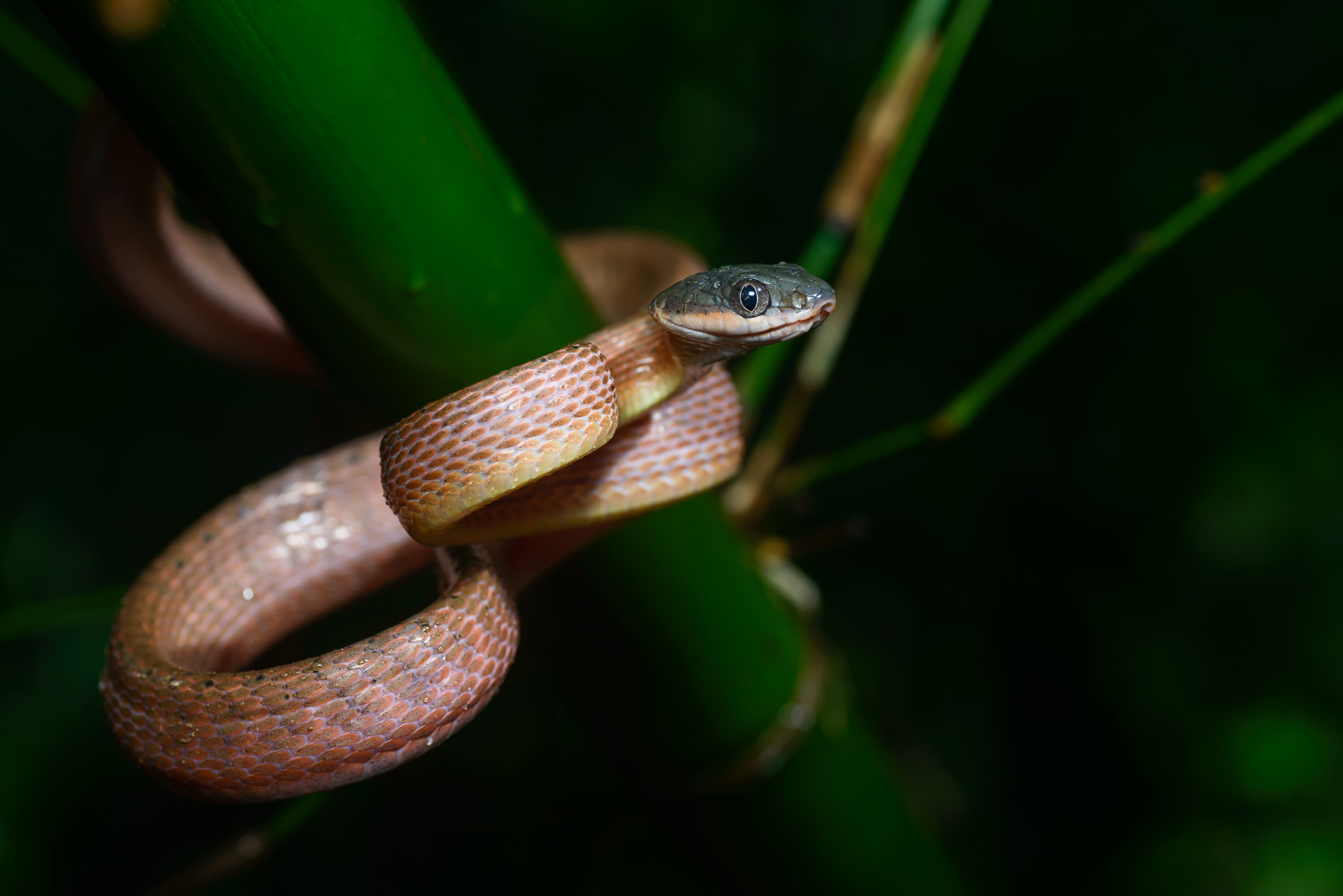

Conservation status
- Least Concern (IUCN 3.1)

Scientific classification
- Kingdom: Animalia
- Phylum: Chordata
- Class: Reptilia
- Order: Squamata
- Suborder: Serpentes
- Family: Colubridae
- Genus: Boiga
- Species: B. nigriceps

Binomial name
- Boiga nigriceps (Günther, 1863)
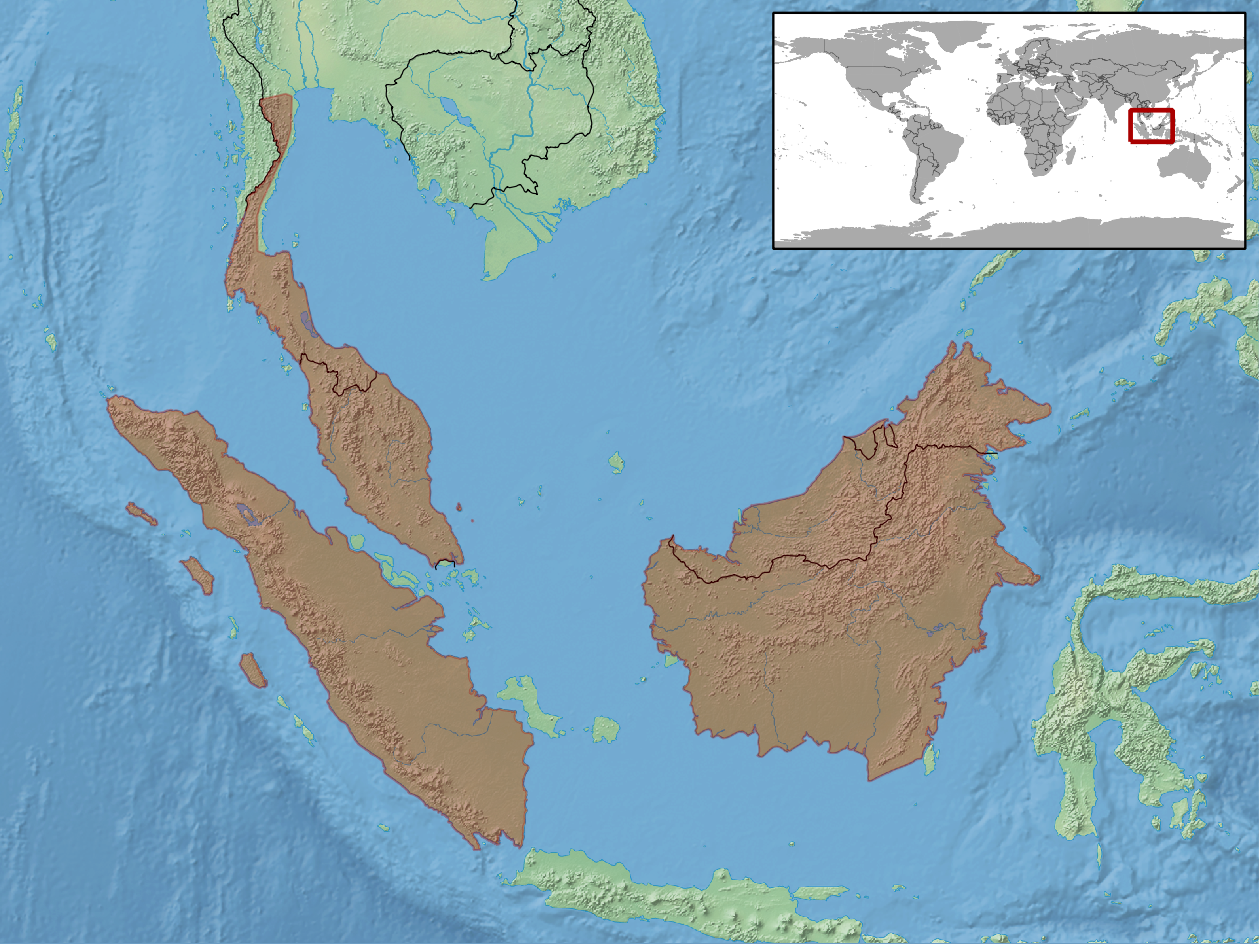

Synonyms
- Dipsas nigriceps Günther, 1863; Dipsadomorphus nigriceps Boulenger, 1896

= Boiga nigriceps =

Black-Headed Cat Snake

Species of snake

Boiga nigriceps (black-headed cat snake) is a species of colubrid snake from South-East Asia. They are large snakes; adults may attain a total length of 1.75 m (5 1/2 ft).

== Description ==
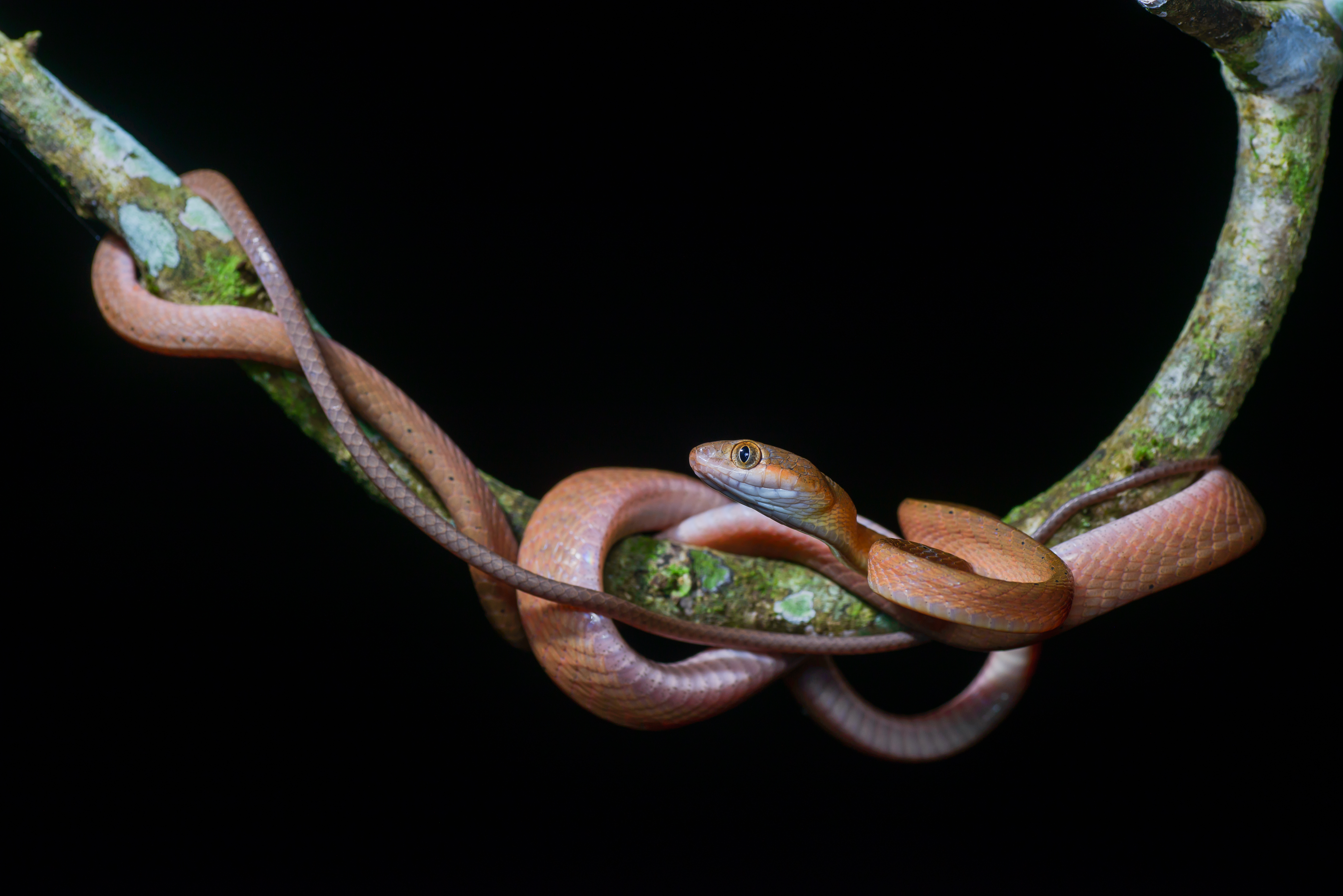
'Boiga nigriceps' (subadult) in Khao Luang National Park, Thailand

It gets its name from the greenish to blackish coloration of its head. Neonates and juveniles do not exhibit this dark color on the head until adulthood. The body color ranges greatly from brown, orange, red, and even black. The ventral region of the snake is yellowish below the neck and white for the rest.

== Subspecies ==
Two subspecies are recognized:

- Boiga nigriceps nigriceps (Günther, 1863)
- Boiga nigriceps brevicauda Smith, 1926

== Distribution ==
Indonesia, Borneo, Peninsular Malaysia, Thailand.

== Habitat ==
The black-headed cat snake is arboreal, but frequently comes down to the ground in search of prey. They occupy lowland and mid-elevation tropical rainforests of Southeast Asia.

== Venom ==
Little is known about the black-headed cat snake's venom toxicity on humans, but it is thought to be comparable to the severity of a copperhead. This rear fanged colubrid's bite rarely results in adverse effects due to its poor venom delivery system. Luckily their fangs' positioning doesn't result in any significant envenomation.

Symptoms tend to stay localized to the envenomation site, limiting the victim to minor pain.

== Diet ==
The black-headed cat snake feeds on lizards, frogs, birds, small mammals and other snakes in the wild.
