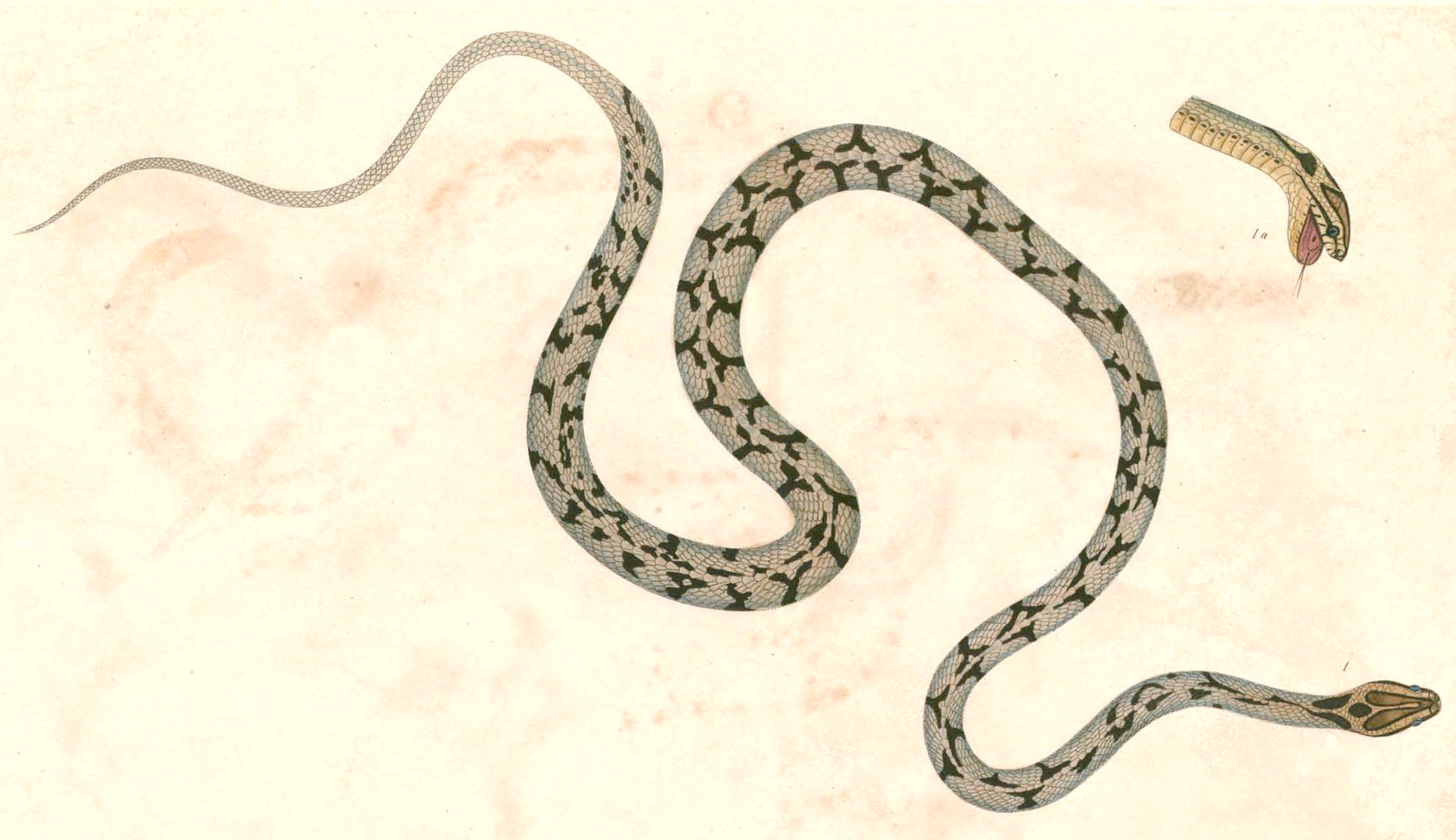

Conservation status
- Least Concern (IUCN 3.1)

Scientific classification
- Kingdom: Animalia
- Phylum: Chordata
- Class: Reptilia
- Order: Squamata
- Suborder: Serpentes
- Family: Colubridae
- Genus: Boiga
- Species: B. gocool

Binomial name
- Boiga gocool (Gray, 1835)

Synonyms
- Dipsas gokool Gray, 1835; Dipsadomorphus gokool Boulenger, 1896; Boiga gokool Gray, 1835

= Arrowback tree snake =

Species of snake

The arrowback tree snake (Boiga gocool) is a species of rear-fanged colubrid found in Bhutan, Bangladesh and India (Assam, Sikkim, Arunachal Pradesh (Chessa - Papum Pare district).
