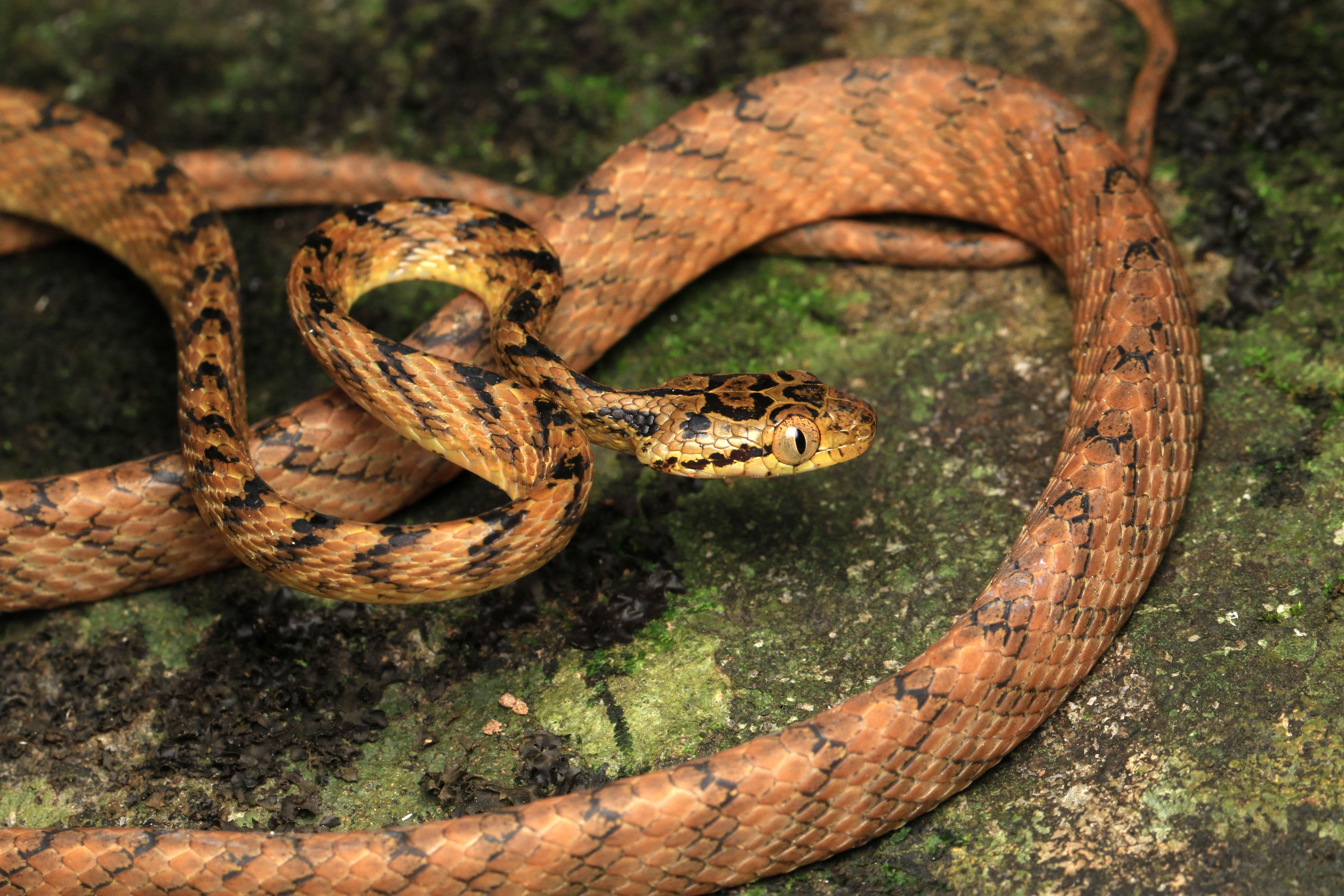

Scientific classification
- Kingdom: Animalia
- Phylum: Chordata
- Class: Reptilia
- Order: Squamata
- Suborder: Serpentes
- Family: Colubridae
- Genus: Boiga
- Species: B. thackerayi

Binomial name
- Boiga thackerayi Giri, Deepak, Captain, Pawar & Tillack, 2019

= Boiga thackerayi =

Species of snake

Boiga thackerayi, or Thackeray's cat snake, is arboreal, mostly seen close to forest streams, and is active during the night. It is rear fanged and is known to grow up to three feet in length. It is endemic to the Western Ghats, India.

== Etymology ==
The epithet, thackerayi, is in honor of Indian conservationist and wildlife researcher Tejas Thackeray.

== Geographic range ==
Boiga thackerayi is described from Koyna region of Satara district in western Maharashtra, India.

It can be found from the mid-high elevation of western ghats in the States of Maharashtra, Goa, Karnataka, Tamilnadu and Kerala.

== Diet ==
It feeds on eggs of Humayun's night frog (Nyctibatrachus humayuni). This behavior was never reported in cat snakes from the Western Ghats earlier.
