= Boiga ranawanei =

Conservation status
- Data Deficient (IUCN 3.1)

Scientific classification
- Kingdom: Animalia
- Phylum: Chordata
- Class: Reptilia
- Order: Squamata
- Suborder: Serpentes
- Family: Colubridae
- Genus: Boiga
- Species: B. ranawanei

Binomial name
- Boiga ranawanei (Samarawickrama, Samarawickrama, Wijesena, & Orlov, 2005)
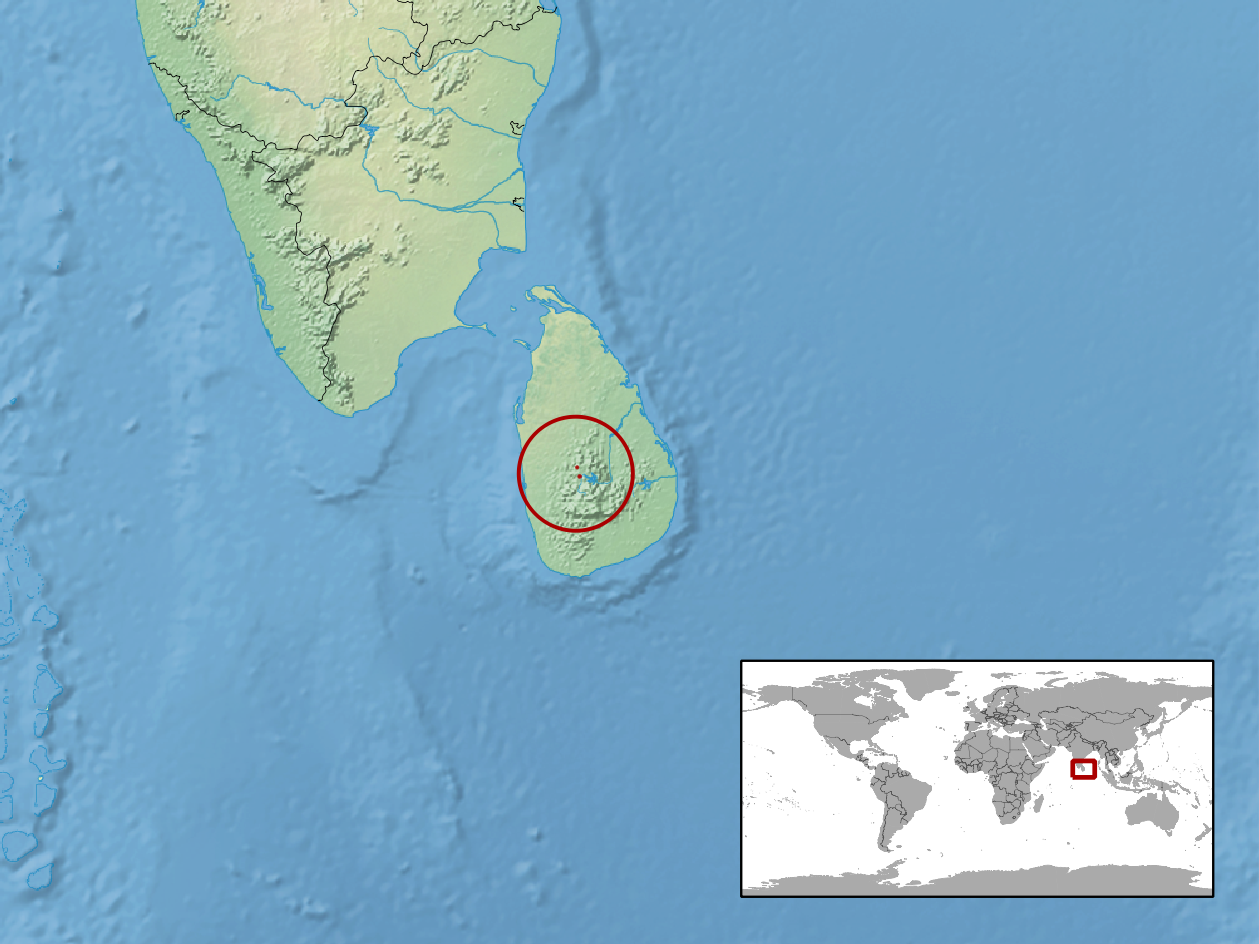

Species of snake

Boiga ranawanei, commonly known as Ranawana's cat snake, is a species of snake in the family Colubridae. The species is endemic to Sri Lanka.
