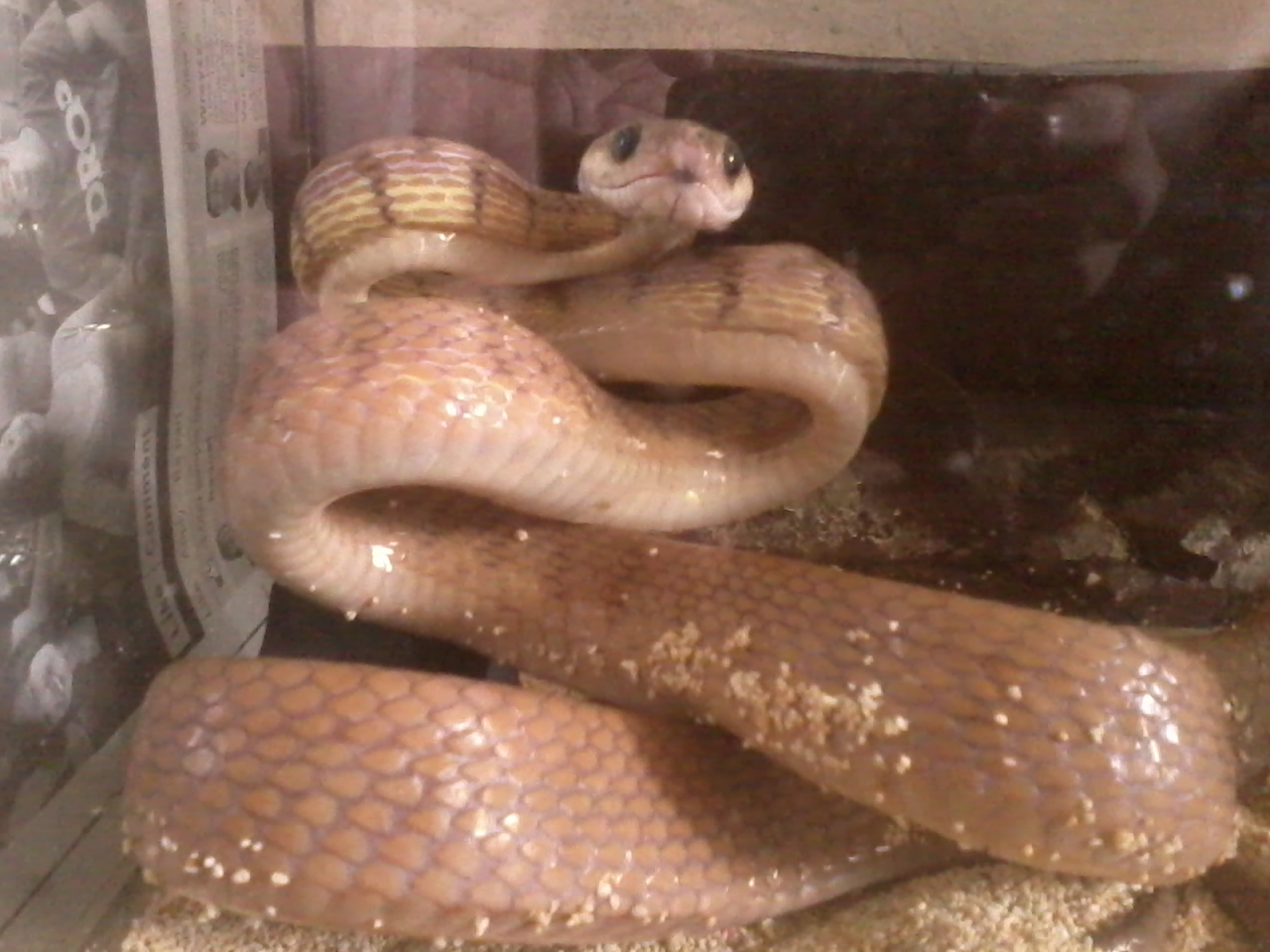

Conservation status
- Least Concern (IUCN 3.1)

Scientific classification
- Kingdom: Animalia
- Phylum: Chordata
- Class: Reptilia
- Order: Squamata
- Suborder: Serpentes
- Family: Colubridae
- Genus: Boiga
- Species: B. philippina

Binomial name
- Boiga philippina (Peters, 1867)
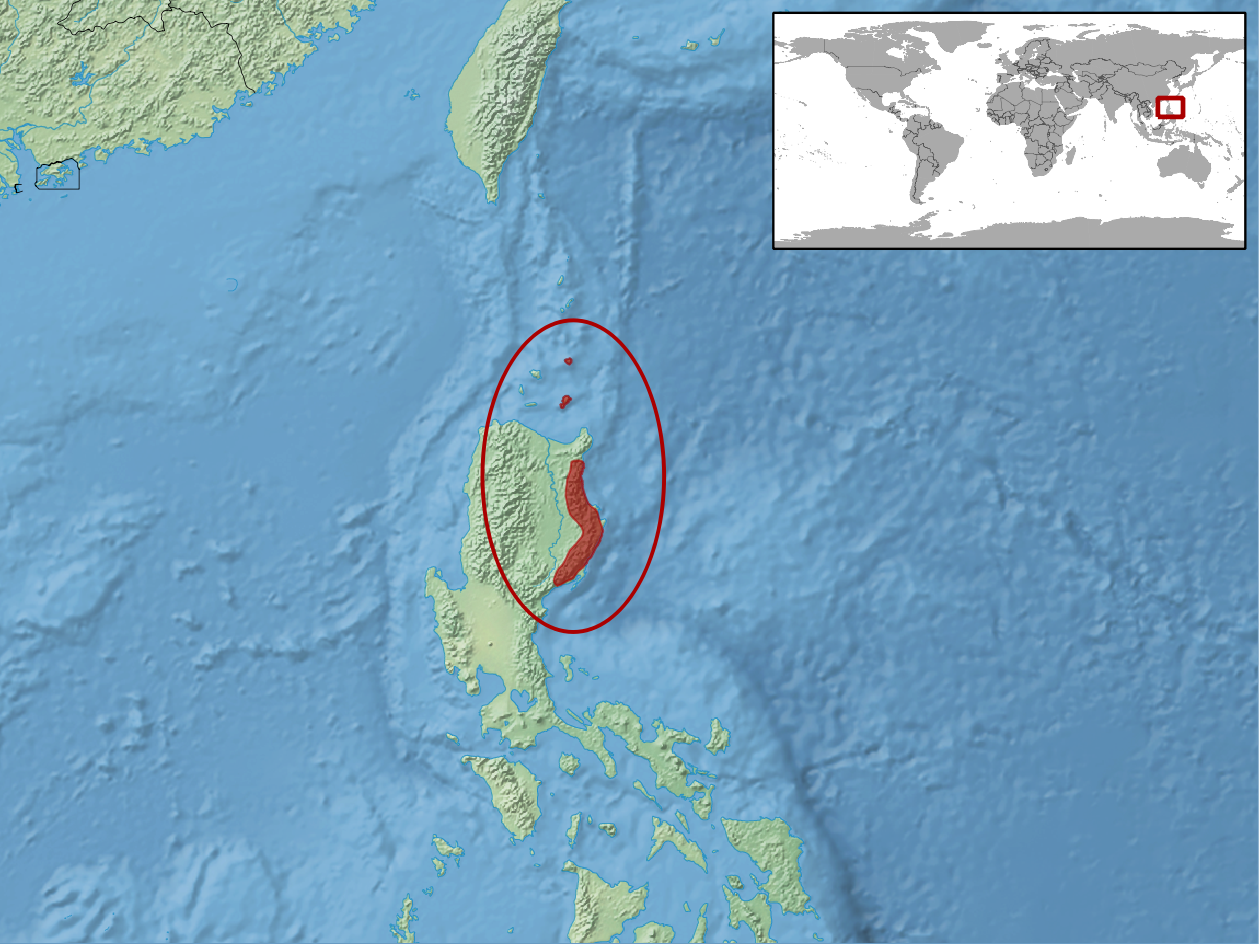

Synonyms
- Dipsas Philippina Peters, 1867

= Boiga philippina =

Species of snake

Boiga philippina, also known as the tawny cat eyed snake or Philippine cat snake, a species of rear-fanged colubrid snake that is endemic to the Philippines.

== Description ==
It has a very slender body that can reach lengths of up to 213 cm (7.0 ft). The big head is of typical Boiga fashion with big eyes and elliptical pupils much like a cat's eye. The white chin extends down the neck to almost half of its body. Body coloration maybe tan, light brown, brown, coffee-color to a pale orange. The underside is made-up of big belly scute scales that is usually tan to orange in color. Underneath the scales of the neck are yellow, black and white markings. Tongue color is black with white or gray tips.

== Distribution ==
Boiga philippina is endemic to the Philippines. It is found in Luzon, Camiguin Norte, Babuyan Claro, and Dalupiri at elevations of 50–800 m (160–2,620 ft) above sea level.

This snakes has sighting also on any other Luzon province like Quezon/Rizal Boundary according to FB Group Snake Identification of the Philippines and another sighting from Catanduanes according to John Gil and FB pages called Catanduanes Biodiversity: List of Native and Non Native Species.

== Habitat ==
It is mostly arboreal and occurs in pristine and disturbed old growth tropical moist forest as well as secondary forest and forest edge habitats.

== Behavior ==
Like all Boigas, it is highly nocturnal. Its generally docile but a very nervous snake when alarmed. It will not hesitate to bite, however. When threatened; it raises its head, expands the scales of its neck to show off its warning coloration, as well as to make itself appear bigger than it really is, then makes a puffing noise and may strike repeatedly. An arboreal snake, it will rarely descend on the ground unless it is looking for prey or a place to hide in times of heavy rain.

== Diet and feeding habits ==
Like all cat-eyed snakes, it is a very voracious hunter, actively pursuing its prey that consists primarily of birds and their fledglings . They are usually found near chicken coops where they feed on eggs. They may sometimes enter houses and feed on captive pet birds. Other prey may also be taken, given the opportunity. Frogs, lizards and small rodents may sometimes be eaten.

== Reproduction and lifespan ==
Mating usually begins around November up until January, where it lays 6 to 14 eggs in a single clutch, usually deposited inside holes in tree trunks or on loose ground covered by low vegetation.

Males are determined by their slender bodies, brighter coloration and a very long tail. Females on the other hand; are stouter with a much shorter tail and duller colors.

They usually live for up to 15 years in captivity and less in the wild.

== Venom ==
Like most rear-fanged snakes, the tawny cat-eyed snake is mildly venomous. Although its venom is said to be slightly stronger than most Boiga species, its rounded mouth is very unlikely to cause an envenomating bite. If it does come to a point of envenomation, there is swelling in the bite area that usually subsides within two to three days. No fatalities have been reported so far.

== Conservation status ==
The IUCN lists this species as of "least concern" because it has wide distribution and it is presumed that the population is large; it is suffering habitat loss and fragmentation, but it is not declining fast enough to warrant listing in a more threatened category.
