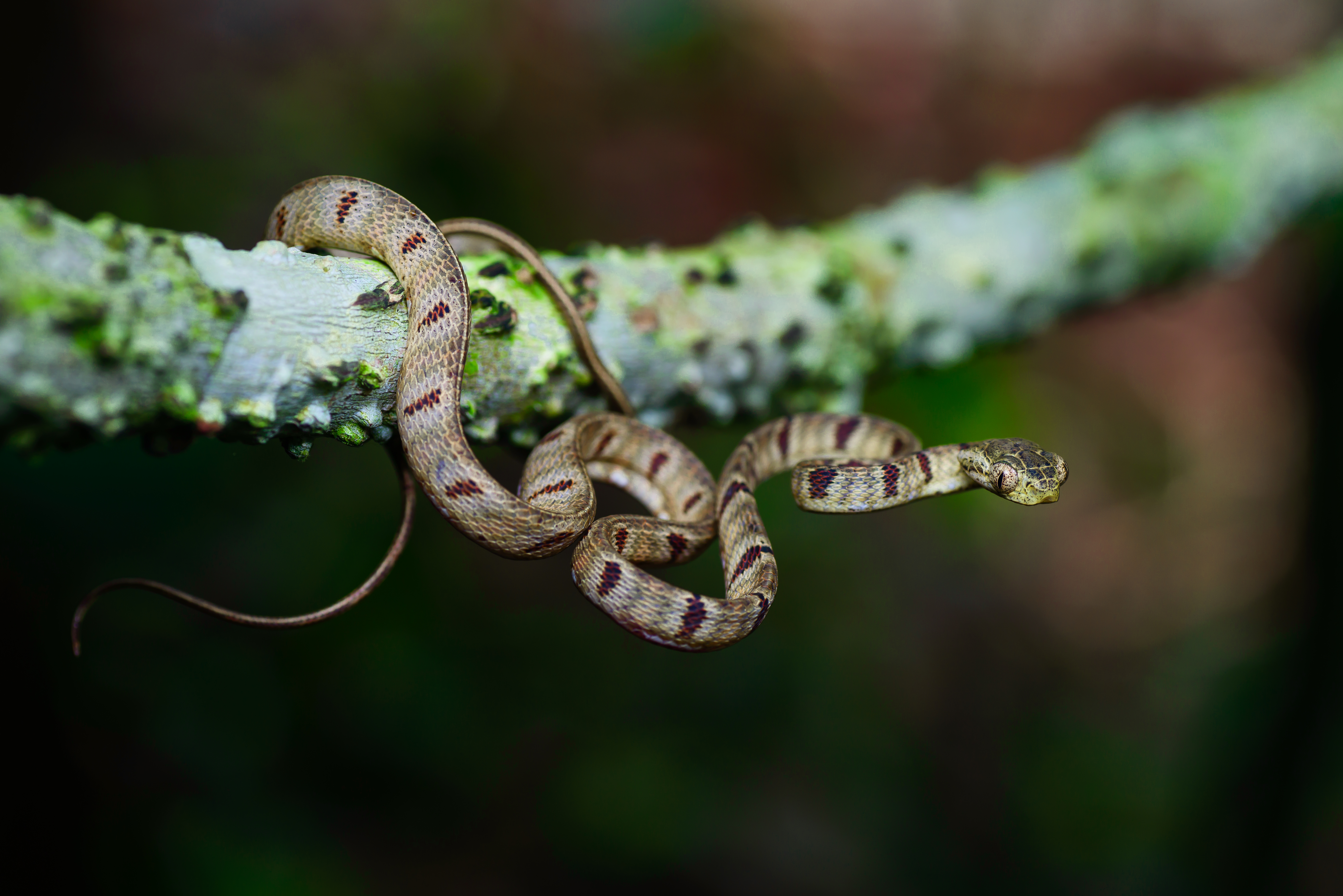

Conservation status
- Data Deficient (IUCN 3.1)

Scientific classification
- Kingdom: Animalia
- Phylum: Chordata
- Class: Reptilia
- Order: Squamata
- Suborder: Serpentes
- Family: Colubridae
- Genus: Boiga
- Species: B. bengkuluensis

Binomial name
- Boiga bengkuluensis Orlov, Kudryavtzev, Ryabov & Shumakov, 2003

= Boiga bengkuluensis =

Species of snake

Boiga bengkuluensis is a species of snake of the family Colubridae.

== Geographic range ==
The snake is found in Southern Thailand, West Malaysia, and Indonesia (Sumatra and Bengkulu province).
