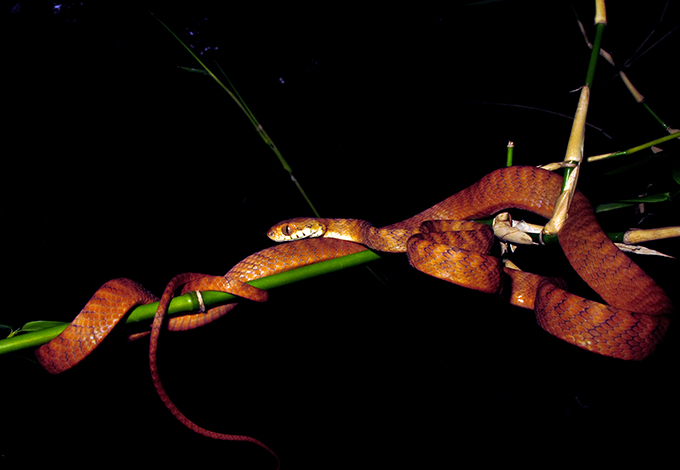

Conservation status
- Endangered (IUCN 3.1)

Scientific classification
- Kingdom: Animalia
- Phylum: Chordata
- Class: Reptilia
- Order: Squamata
- Suborder: Serpentes
- Family: Colubridae
- Genus: Boiga
- Species: B. andamanensis

Binomial name
- Boiga andamanensis (Wall, 1909)

Synonyms
- Dipsadomorphus andamanensis Wall, 1909; Boiga ceylonensis — M.A. Smith, 1943; Boiga andamanensis — Das, 1996

= Boiga andamanensis =

Species of snake

Boiga andamanensis, known commonly as the Andaman cat snake, is a species of rear-fanged snake in the family Colubridae. The species is endemic to the Andaman Islands.

== Description ==
The body of B. andamanensis is long, thin, and laterally compressed, with smooth dorsal scales. The head is distinctly broader than the neck. The eye is large, and has a vertical pupil. The tail is long. Dorsally, the Andaman cat snake is pale reddish or greyish brown, uniform, or with a series of dark brown vertebral spots or thin cross-lines. There is dark colour usually on the scale edges. The markings are most distinct on the forebody. The top of the head has faint, dark brown or black lines. The upper lip scales are white, the last few with thin black rear edges. There is an indistinct black line from behind the eye to the angle of the mouth. The underside of the body is white or yellowish, usually with a series of black spots on each side. Juveniles and sub-adults are similarly patterned, and usually dark orange above, paler below. Most of the scales on the top of the head vary in shape and size, and are distinctly larger than the dorsal scales. The average adult total length (including tail) is approximately 0.85 metres (2.8 ft), but it may grow to a total length of 1.49 metres (4.9 ft).

=== Scalation ===
Dorsal scales in 21:21:15 oblique rows, smooth; vertebral scales distinctly enlarged. Ventrals 255–269, strongly angulate laterally; anal entire; subcaudals 118–133, paired. Loreal 1; preocular 1, reaches upper surface of head, often touches frontal; postoculars 2, rarely 3; temporals 3+3 or 3+4; supralabials 8 (3rd to 5th touching eye).

== Geographic range ==
B. andamanensis is endemic to the Andaman islands of India.

== Habitat ==
The Andaman cat snake is a forest species and is also frequently found in thatched roofs of houses.

== Behaviour and ecology ==
B. andamanensis is nocturnal and arboreal. It is occasionally seen on the ground searching for prey. It generally has a mild disposition but has been observed to strike when approached. If provoked it will raise its forebody, coil into loops, often vibrating its tail, and bite readily. It is a rear-fanged snake and has a mild venom which can paralyze small prey. It preys mainly on geckos, other small lizards (especially lizards of the genus Calotes), and rodents, but will occasionally eat tree frogs and bats.
