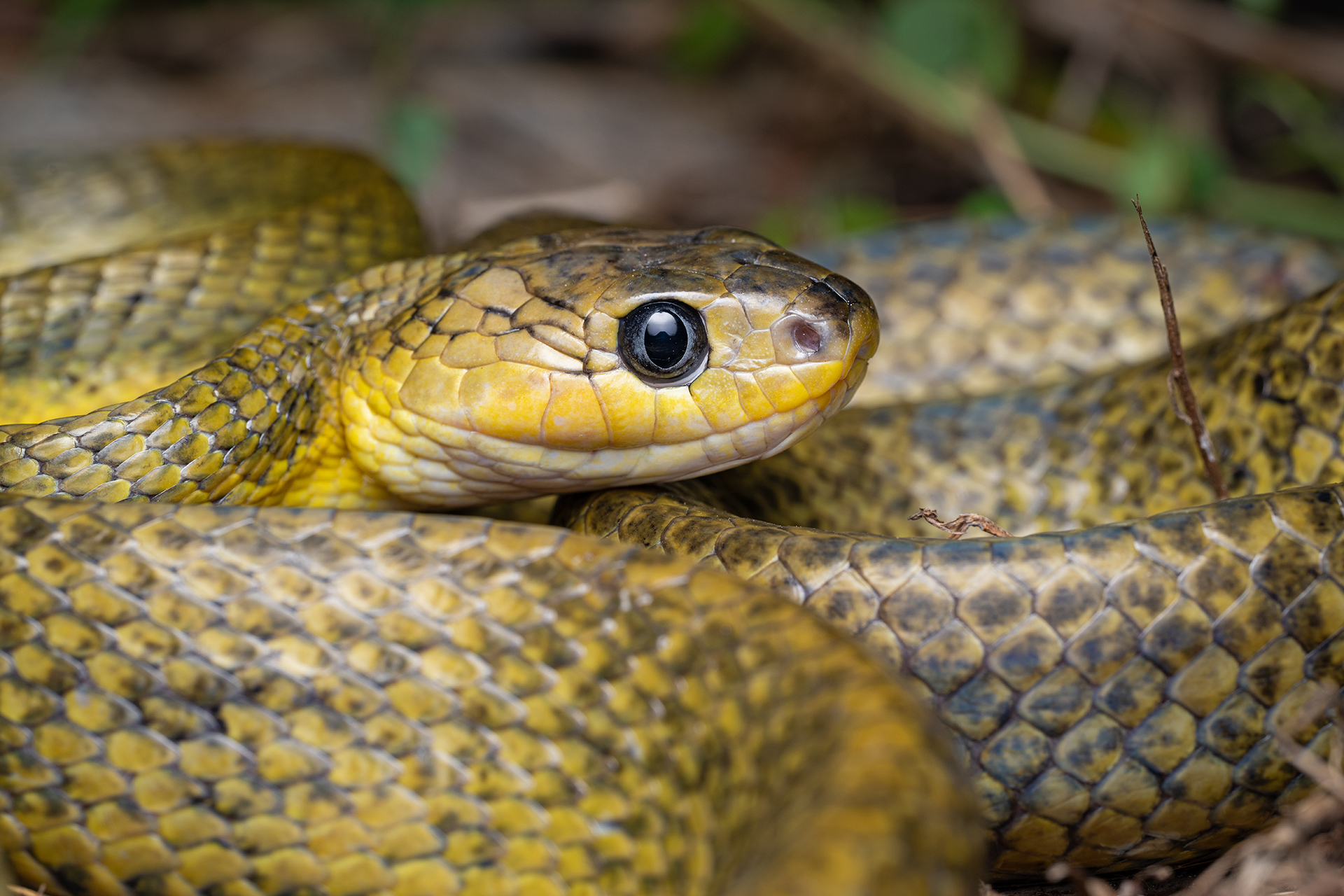

Conservation status
- Data Deficient (IUCN 3.1)

Scientific classification
- Kingdom: Animalia
- Phylum: Chordata
- Class: Reptilia
- Order: Squamata
- Suborder: Serpentes
- Family: Colubridae
- Genus: Boiga
- Species: B. wallachi

Binomial name
- Boiga wallachi Das, 1998

= Boiga wallachi =

Species of snake

Boiga wallachi, also known commonly as the Nicobar cat snake, is a species of rear-fanged snake in the family Colubridae. The species is endemic to the Nicobar Islands.

== Geographic range ==
B. wallachi is known from the islands of Great Nicobar and Little Nicobar.

== Etymology ==
The specific name, wallachi, is in honour of Van Wallach, an American herpetologist.

== Description ==
B. wallachi is a medium-sized member of its genus, measuring 73.5–105.0 cm (28.9–41.3 in) in snout-to-vent length (SVL) and reaching a total body length (including tail) of at least 131 cm (52 in). The head is small and distinct from the neck; the eyes are large. The dorsum is cinnamon-coloured and edged with brownish olive. The ventrum is spectrum yellow with dark, rounded blotches.

== Ecology ==
B. wallachi is a nocturnal snake inhabiting undisturbed tropical moist forests, at altitudes of 300–400 m (980–1,310 ft). It seems to be strictly terrestrial. It feeds on eggs (including those of domestic chickens) as well as on frogs and other small animals.

== Reproduction ==
B. wallachi is oviparous.

== Conservation ==
As of 2013 populations of B. wallachi seemed stable, although they might have been significantly reduced by the 2004 Indian Ocean tsunami. B. wallachi can enter anthropogenic habitats to forage, but it is unclear whether it can persist in such habitats. The species occurs within the Great Nicobar Biosphere Reserve, but there is no strict habitat protection.
