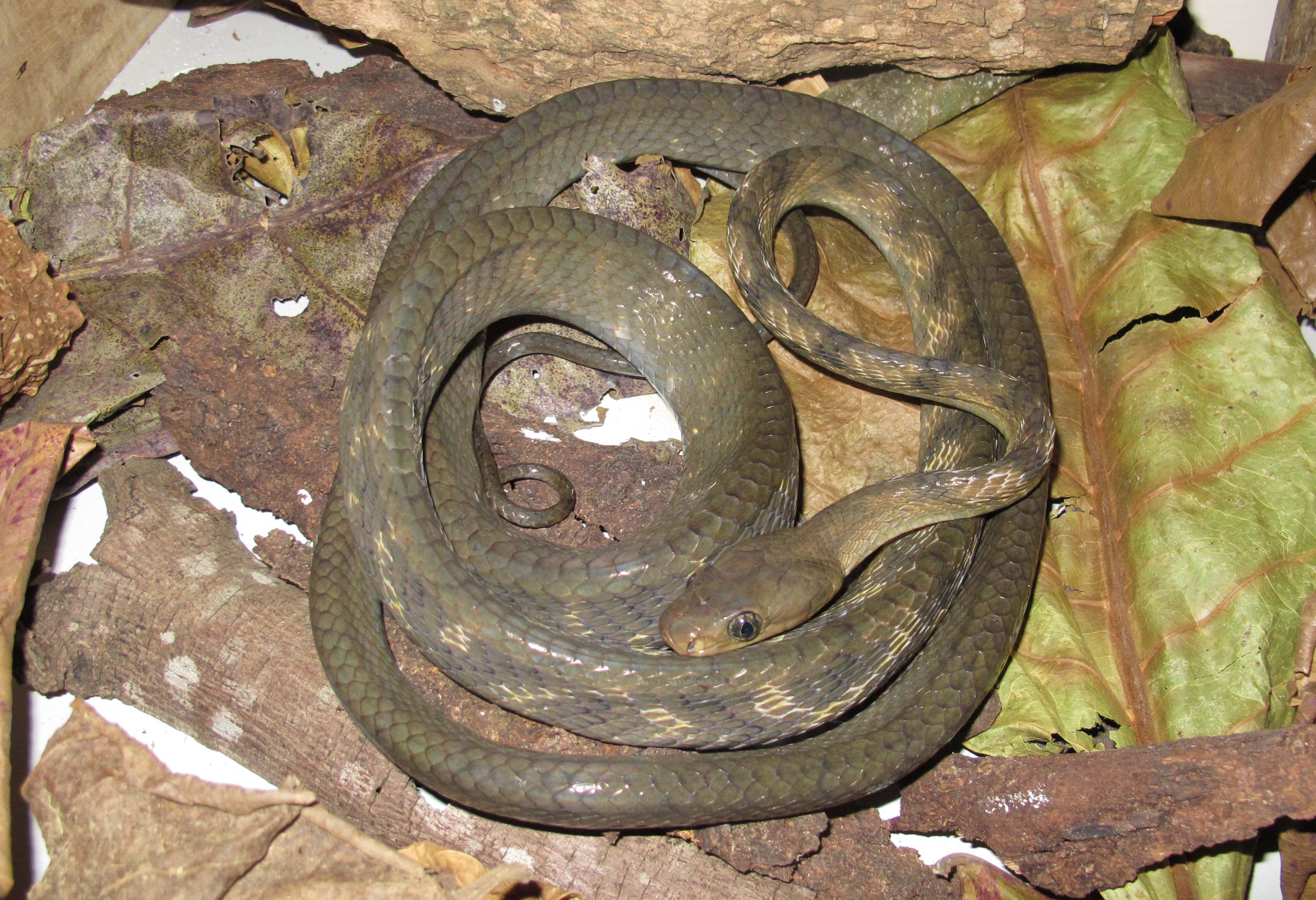
- Adult female

Conservation status
- Least Concern (IUCN 3.1)

Scientific classification
- Kingdom: Animalia
- Phylum: Chordata
- Class: Reptilia
- Order: Squamata
- Suborder: Serpentes
- Family: Colubridae
- Genus: Boiga
- Species: B. guangxiensis

Binomial name
- Boiga guangxiensis Wen, 1998

= Boiga guangxiensis =

Species of snake

Boiga guangxiensis is a species of snakes of the family Colubridae. It is sometimes known as the Guangxi cat snake.

== Geographic range ==
The snake is found in southern China (Guangxi province), Laos, and Vietnam.

== Habitat and behaviour ==
Boiga guangxiensis is a nocturnal and arboreal snake that occurs in both primary and secondary evergreen forest.
