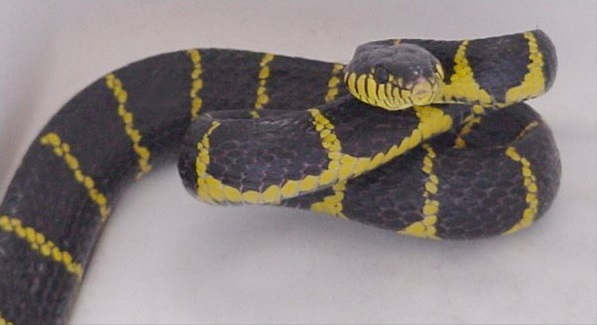
- Boiga dendrophila, mangrove snake

Scientific classification
- Kingdom: Animalia
- Phylum: Chordata
- Class: Reptilia
- Order: Squamata
- Suborder: Serpentes
- Family: Colubridae
- Subfamily: Colubrinae
- Genus: Boiga; Fitzinger, 1826

= Boiga =

Genus of snakes

Boiga is a large genus of rear-fanged, mildly venomous snakes, known commonly as cat-eyed snakes or simply cat snakes, in the family Colubridae. Species of the genus Boiga are native to southeast Asia, India, and Australia, but due to their extremely hardy nature and adaptability, have spread to many other suitable habitats around the world. There are 38 recognized species in the genus. According to the study done by Jiří Smíd regarding Old World cat snakes, the ancestor of the cat snake originated in Africa, from where it diversified and expanded to other countries. Despite this diversity however, the different species have very similar needs in terms of temperature and precipitation.

== Species and subspecies ==
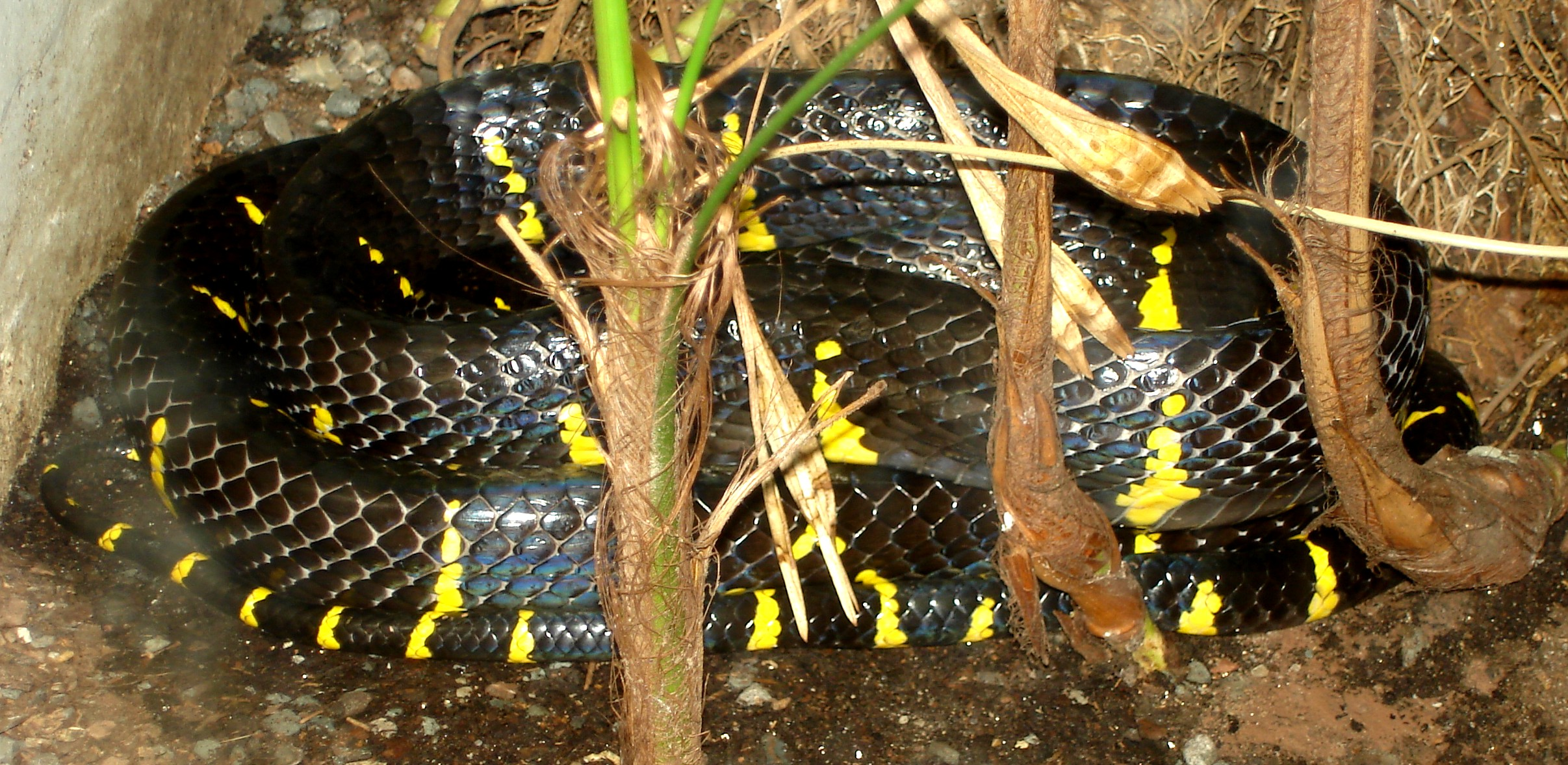
Mangrove snake at the United States National Zoological Park.

The following species and subspecies are recognized as being valid.

- Boiga andamanensis (Wall, 1909) – Andaman cat snake
- Boiga angulata (W. Peters, 1861) – Leyte cat snake – Philippines
- Boiga barnesii (Günther, 1869) – Barnes' cat snake – Sri Lanka
- Boiga beddomei (Wall, 1909) – Beddome's cat snake – Western Ghat mountains and Sri Lanka
- Boiga bengkuluensis Orlov, Kudryavtzev, Ryabov & Shumakov, 2003 –
- Boiga bourreti Tillack, Ziegler & Le Khac Quyet, 2004 – Bourret's cat snake – central Vietnam
- Boiga ceylonensis (Günther, 1858) – Sri Lanka cat snake
- Boiga cyanea (A.M.C. Duméril, Bibron & A.H.A. Duméril, 1854) – green cat snake – Mainland Southeast Asia to eastern India
- Boiga cynodon (F. Boie, 1827) – dog-toothed cat snake – Sundaland and Philippines
- Boiga dendrophila (F. Boie, 1827) – gold-ringed cat snake, mangrove snake
  - Boiga dendrophila annectens (Boulenger, 1896)
  - Boiga dendrophila dendrophila (F. Boie, 1827)
  - Boiga dendrophila divergens Taylor, 1922
  - Boiga dendrophila gemmicincta (A.M.C. Duméril, Bibron & A.H.A. Duméril, 1854)
  - Boiga dendrophila latifasciata (Boulenger, 1896)
  - Boiga dendrophila levitoni Gaulke, Demegillo & G. Vogel, 2005
  - Boiga dendrophila multicincta (Boulenger, 1896)
  - Boiga dendrophila occidentalis Brongersma, 1934
- Boiga dightoni (Boulenger, 1894) – Pirmad cat snake – India (Western Ghats)
  - Boiga dightoni whitakeri Ganesh, Mallik, Achyuthan, Shanker & G. Vogel, 2021 – Whitaker's cat snake
- Boiga drapiezii (H. Boie in F. Boie, 1827) – white-spotted cat snake
- Boiga flaviviridis G. Vogel & Ganesh, 2013 - yellow-green cat snake - eastern peninsular India
- Boiga forsteni (A.M.C. Duméril, Bibron & A.H.A. Duméril, 1854) – Forsten's cat snake – Indian subcontinent
- Boiga gocool (Gray, 1835) – arrowback tree snake – Bengal, Assam
- Boiga guangxiensis Wen, 1998 – southern China, Laos, Vietnam
- Boiga hoeseli Ramadhan, Iskandar & Subasri, 2010 - Lesser Sundas cat snake
- Boiga irregularis (Merrem, 1802) – brown tree snake
- Boiga jaspidea (A.M.C. Duméril, Bibron & A.H.A. Duméril, 1854) – jasper cat snake - Sumatra, Java, Malay peninsula, Borneo
- Boiga kraepelini (Stejneger, 1902) – Kelung cat snake – China, Taiwan, Hainan, Vietnam
- Boiga melanota (Boulenger, 1896)
- Boiga multifasciata (Blyth, 1861) – many-banded cat snake
- Boiga multomaculata (F. Boie, 1827) – many-spotted cat snake – Himalayan foothills (Himachal Pradesh to Sikkim, Nepal, Bhutan)
- Boiga nigriceps (Günther, 1863) – black-headed cat snake – Sumatra, Malay Peninsula, Borneo
- Boiga nuchalis (Günther, 1875) – collared cat snake – southwestern India (Western and Eastern Ghats)
- Boiga ochracea (Günther, 1868) – tawny cat snake
- Boiga philippina (W. Peters, 1867) – Philippine cat snake
- Boiga quincunciata (Wall, 1908) – Assam, Burma
- Boiga ranawanei (Samarawickrama, Samarawickrama, Wijesena, & Orlov, 2005) – Ranawana's cat snake – Sri Lanka
- Boiga saengsomi Nutphand, 1985 – banded cat snake
- Boiga schultzei Taylor, 1923 – Schultze's blunt-headed tree snake
- Boiga siamensis (Nutphand, 1971) – gray cat snake
- Boiga tanahjampeana Orlov & Ryabov, 2002
- Boiga thackerayi Giri, Deepak, Captain, Pawar & Tillack, 2019 – Thackeray's cat snake – Western Ghats
- Boiga trigonata (Schneider, 1802) – Indian gamma snake
  - Boiga trigonata trigonata (Schneider, 1802)
  - Boiga trigonata melanocephala (Annandale, 1904)
- Boiga wallachi Das, 1998 – Nicobar cat snake
- Boiga westermanni Reinhardt, 1863 – Indian egg-eating snake

Nota bene: A binomial authority in parentheses indicates that the species was original described in a genus other than Boiga.

== Phylogeny ==
DNA analysis indicates that Boiga is a sister group to Toxicodryas and Dasypeltis.

Three main clades were identified: (A) B. kraepelini; (B) seven species, B. jaspidea, B. barnesii, B. beddomei, B. ceylonensis, B. quincunciata, B. trigonata, maculata–ochracea; (C) remainder of approximately seventeen species. Within Clade C, subclades include: B. bouretti, drapezii group, cynodon group, irregularis group, B. philippina, B. nigriceps, dendrophila group.

== Description ==
Cat snakes are long-bodied snakes with large heads and large eyes. They vary greatly in pattern and color. Many species have banding, but some are spotted and some are solid-colored. Colors are normally black, brown, or green with white or yellow accents.

== Behaviour ==
Snakes of the genus Boiga are primarily arboreal, nocturnal snakes.

== Diet ==
Snakes of the genus Boiga prey on various small species of lizards, snakes, birds, and mammals.

== Venom ==
The toxicity of Boiga venom varies from species to species, but is not generally considered to be life-threatening to humans. Since their venom does not usually harm humans, they are popular exotic pets.

== Reproduction ==
Boiga species are oviparous.

== In captivity ==
Boiga dendrophila is by far the most common species in captivity, but B. cyanea and B. nigriceps are also found. Nowadays, B. cynodon, B. philippina and a “Katherine morph” of B. irregularis are also circulating in the South-East Asian exotic pet trade. Others are not commonly available. They are hardy and adaptable and tend to do well in captivity after the initial period of stress from the importation process is passed. They are not bred commonly in captivity, so most specimens available are wild caught, and thus are prone to heavy internal parasite load. Adjusting them to a rodent only diet can be difficult for the inexperienced reptile keeper.

== Invasive species ==
Boiga irregularis in particular has been federally banned in the United States because of its effect by accidentally being introduced to the island of Guam. Some time during the 1950s, some B. irregularis of both sexes (or possibly a single female with eggs) reached the island, possibly having hidden in imported plant pots. The island of Guam lacks native snakes or predators that can deal with snakes the size and aggressiveness of B. irregularis. As a result, it has bred unchecked as an invasive species, and has begun consuming the island's bird life in extreme numbers. Dozens of bird species have been completely eradicated from the island, many species that were found nowhere else on earth, and the snake has reached astonishing population densities, reported to be as high as 15,000 snakes per square mile. In addition to devouring the native fauna, this species will routinely crawl into power transformers, and this typically results in both an electrocuted snake and substantial blackouts. In addition, there has been many cases in Guam where deaths are recorded due to the venomous bites from the Boiga snakes. Although they are an invasive species, there has been evidence where there is reverse- colonization of South-East Asia from the Philippines, and the Australasia from Wallacea from multiple lineages within Boiga.
