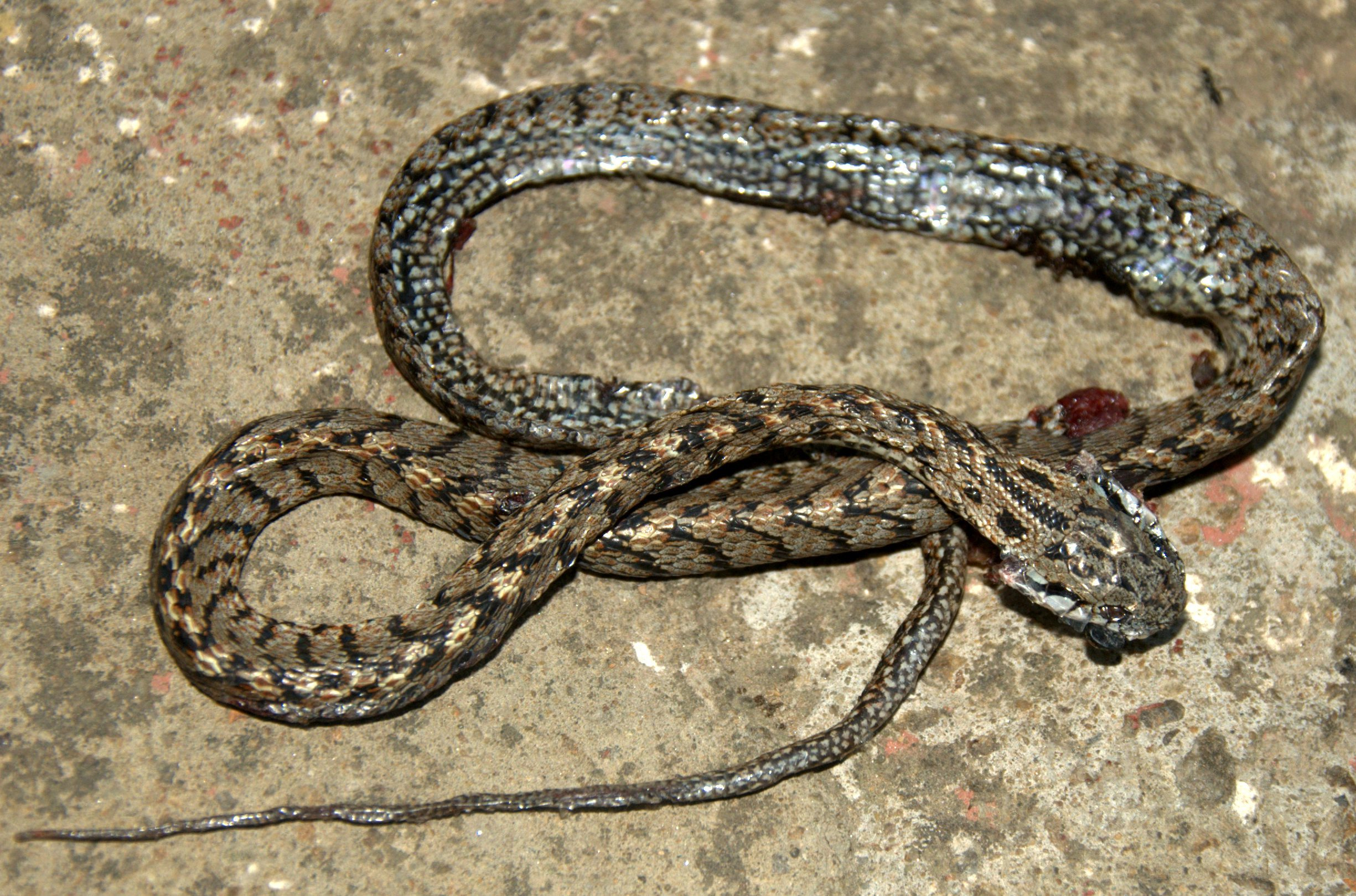

Conservation status
- Least Concern (IUCN 3.1)

Scientific classification
- Kingdom: Animalia
- Phylum: Chordata
- Class: Reptilia
- Order: Squamata
- Suborder: Serpentes
- Family: Colubridae
- Genus: Boiga
- Species: B. multifasciata

Binomial name
- Boiga multifasciata (Blyth, 1861)
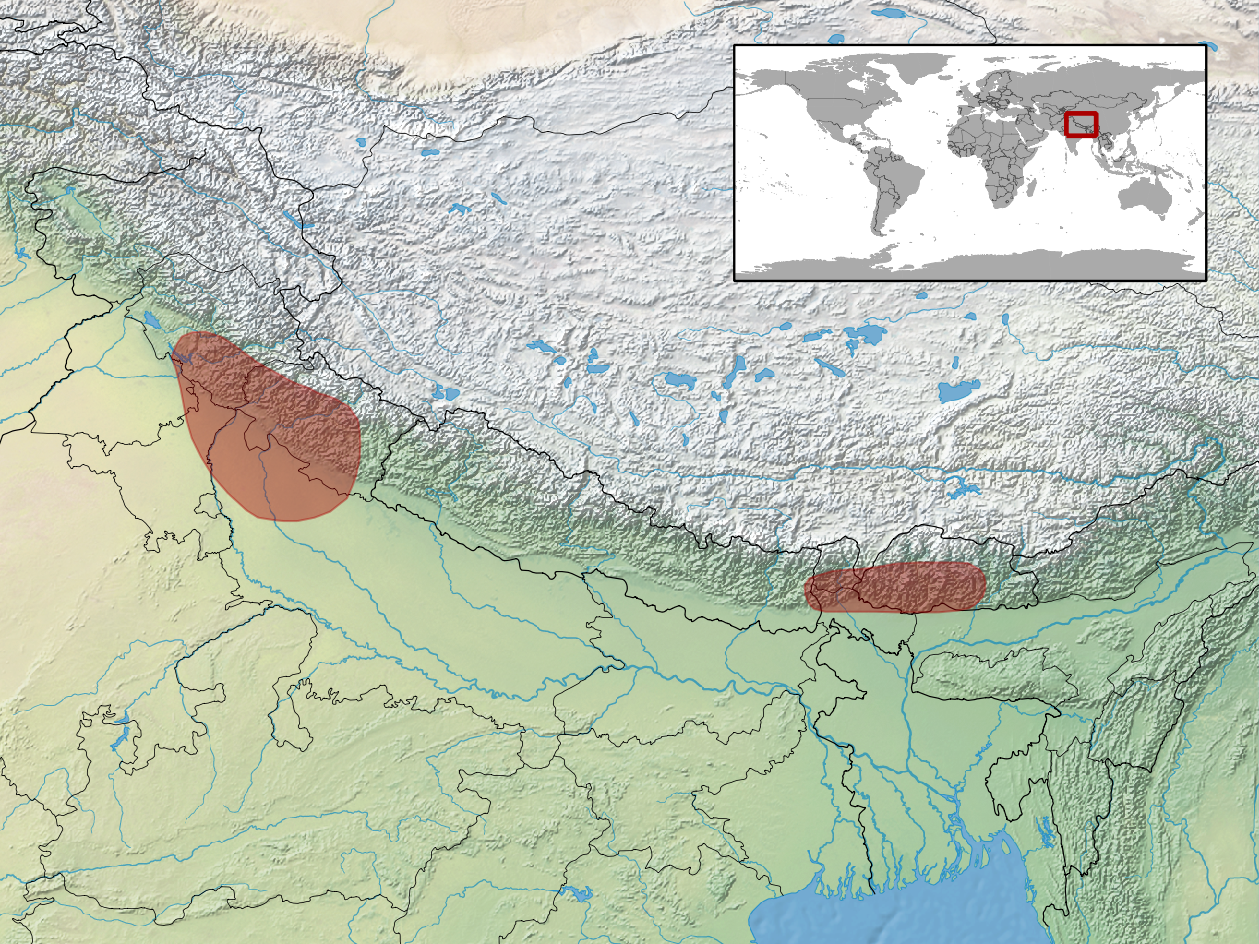

Synonyms
- Dipsas multifasciata Blyth, 1861; Dipsadomorphus multifasciatus Boulenger, 1896

= Many-banded tree snake =

Species of snake

The many-banded tree snake (Boiga multifasciata) is a species of rear-fanged colubrid. Not much is known about it and it is rated as "data deficient" by the IUCN.

== Description ==
Dorsally, it is grayish with oblique black crossbars, and has a series of whitish spots along the vertebral line. On the head, it has a pair of black streaks from the prefrontals to the occiput, another black streak from the eye to the commissure of the jaws, and another along the nape. The upper labials are black-edged. Ventrally, it is spotted or checkered with dark brown or black. Adults are about 875 mm (34.5 in) in total length.

== Geographic range ==
It is found in India (Himachal Pradesh up to Sikkim), Nepal and Bhutan.
