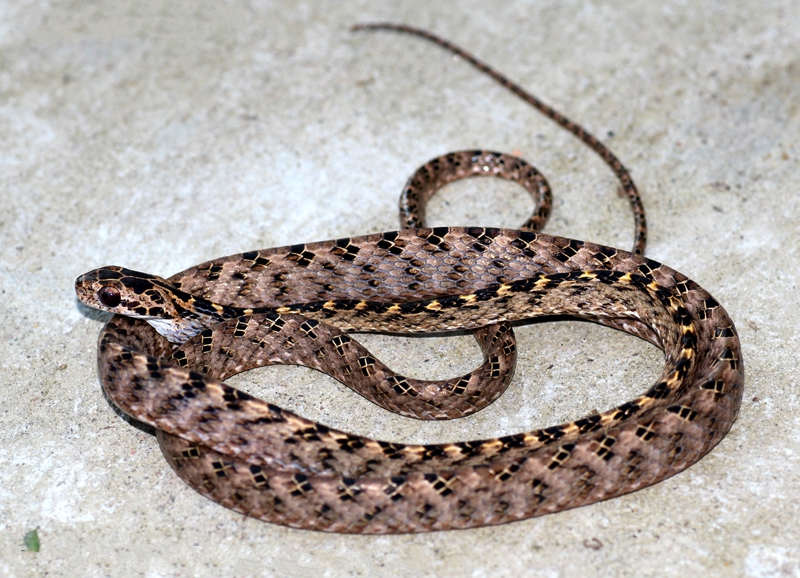

Conservation status
- Least Concern (IUCN 3.1)

Scientific classification
- Kingdom: Animalia
- Phylum: Chordata
- Class: Reptilia
- Order: Squamata
- Suborder: Serpentes
- Family: Colubridae
- Genus: Boiga
- Species: B. quincunciata

Binomial name
- Boiga quincunciata (Wall, 1908)

Synonyms
- Dipsadomorphus quincunciata [sic] Wall, 1908

= Boiga quincunciata =

Species of snake

Boiga quincunciata is a species of cat snake, a rear-fanged colubrid, found in Myanmar (= Burma), India (Assam, Arunachal Pradesh (Chessa, Chimpu, Papum Pare district).
