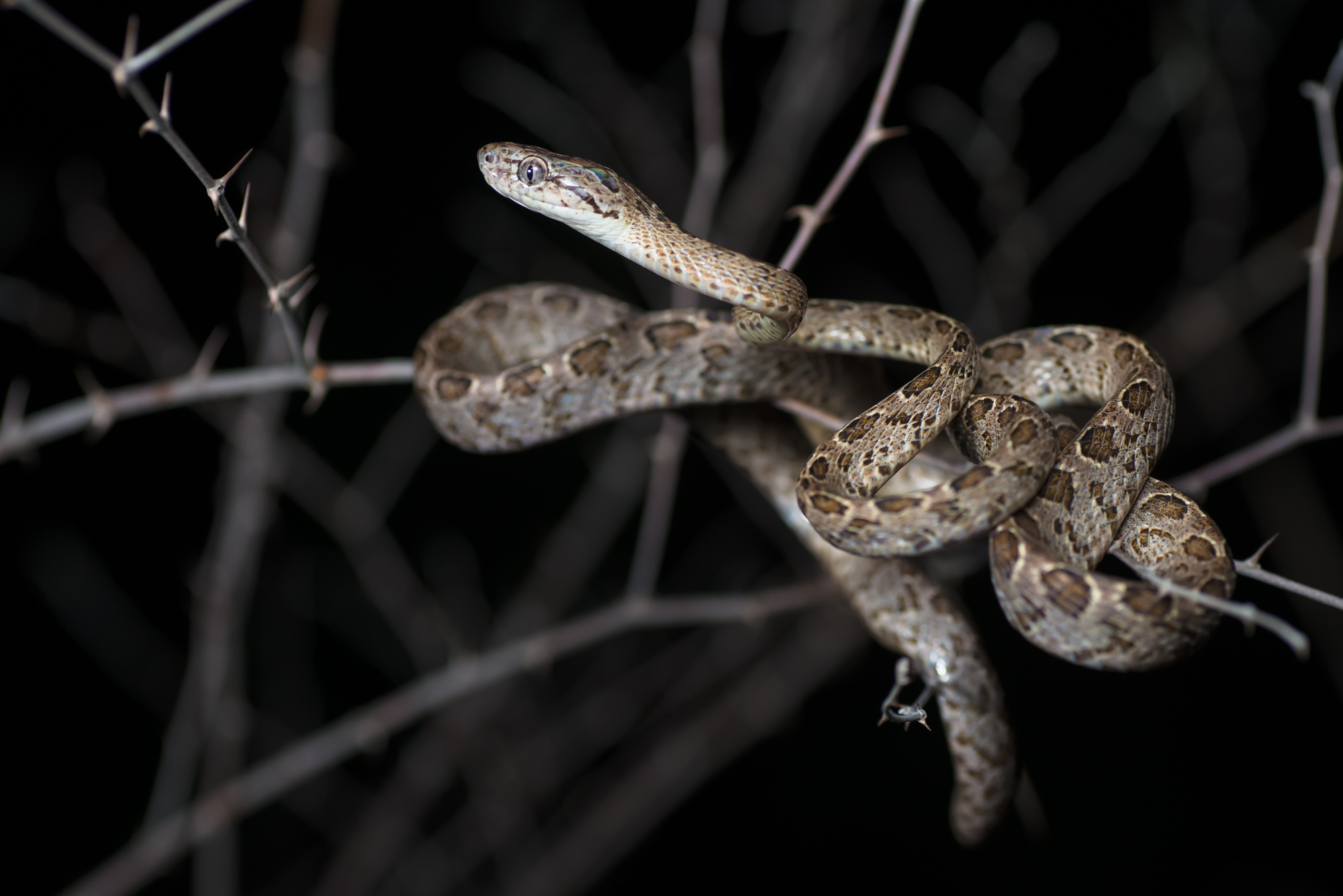

Conservation status
- Least Concern (IUCN 3.1)

Scientific classification
- Kingdom: Animalia
- Phylum: Chordata
- Class: Reptilia
- Order: Squamata
- Suborder: Serpentes
- Family: Colubridae
- Genus: Boiga
- Species: B. multomaculata

Binomial name
- Boiga multomaculata (Boie, 1827)

Synonyms
- Dipsas multomaculata Boie, 1827; Dipsadomorphus multimaculatus Boulenger, 1896

= Boiga multomaculata =

Many-spotted cat snake

Species of snake

Boiga multomaculata, also called the many-spotted cat snake, large-spotted cat snake and marbled cat-eyed snake, is a species of rear-fanged colubrid snakes.

== Description ==
Dorsally it is gray-brown, with two alternating series of round dark brown, reddish-brown or chestnut-colored spots and two other series of smaller spots on the lower sides. On the head it has two blackish bands which diverge posteriorly. There is a blackish streak from the eye to the corner of the mouth. Ventrally it is whitish, marbled or spotted with brown, and there is a series of brown spots along each side. Adults may attain 77 cm (30 in.) in total length.

== Geographic range and Distribution ==
The snake is found in a wide variety of locales, including areas of Western Malaysia, Cambodia, Thailand, Vietnam, Myanmar, India (Assam, Arunachal Pradesh, Miao - Changlang district), Southern China (incl. Hong Kong and Hainan), Indonesia (Java, Sulawesi, Sumatra, Borneo), Bangladesh, Laos, Singapore, Bali and North Central Florida, USA.

== Behavior ==
A very secretive snake, it hides in hollows and cracks of tree trunks during the day. Unlike most boigas, this species is a cathemeral snake, with which it is active at both day and night. It's quite nervous and will scuttle away at the slight disturbance. They rarely bite, however. It prefers rocky crevices and thin branches that are in plain sight.

== Feeding Habits ==
Mostly observed hunting just before daybreak, it primarily feeds on lizards such as geckos and small skinks but they will also eat lizard eggs. This snake also frequents branches that are overhanging a water source, thus it may also devour fish in the process.

== Venom ==
Being a rear-fanged snake, it is mildly venomous. The effects are the same as most boiga species but because of its size, it never poses any threat. There are no known or recorded fatalities as well.
