= Boiga bourreti =

Conservation status
- Endangered (IUCN 3.1)

Scientific classification
- Kingdom: Animalia
- Phylum: Chordata
- Class: Reptilia
- Order: Squamata
- Suborder: Serpentes
- Family: Colubridae
- Genus: Boiga
- Species: B. bourreti

Binomial name
- Boiga bourreti Tillack, Ziegler & Le, 2004

Species of snake

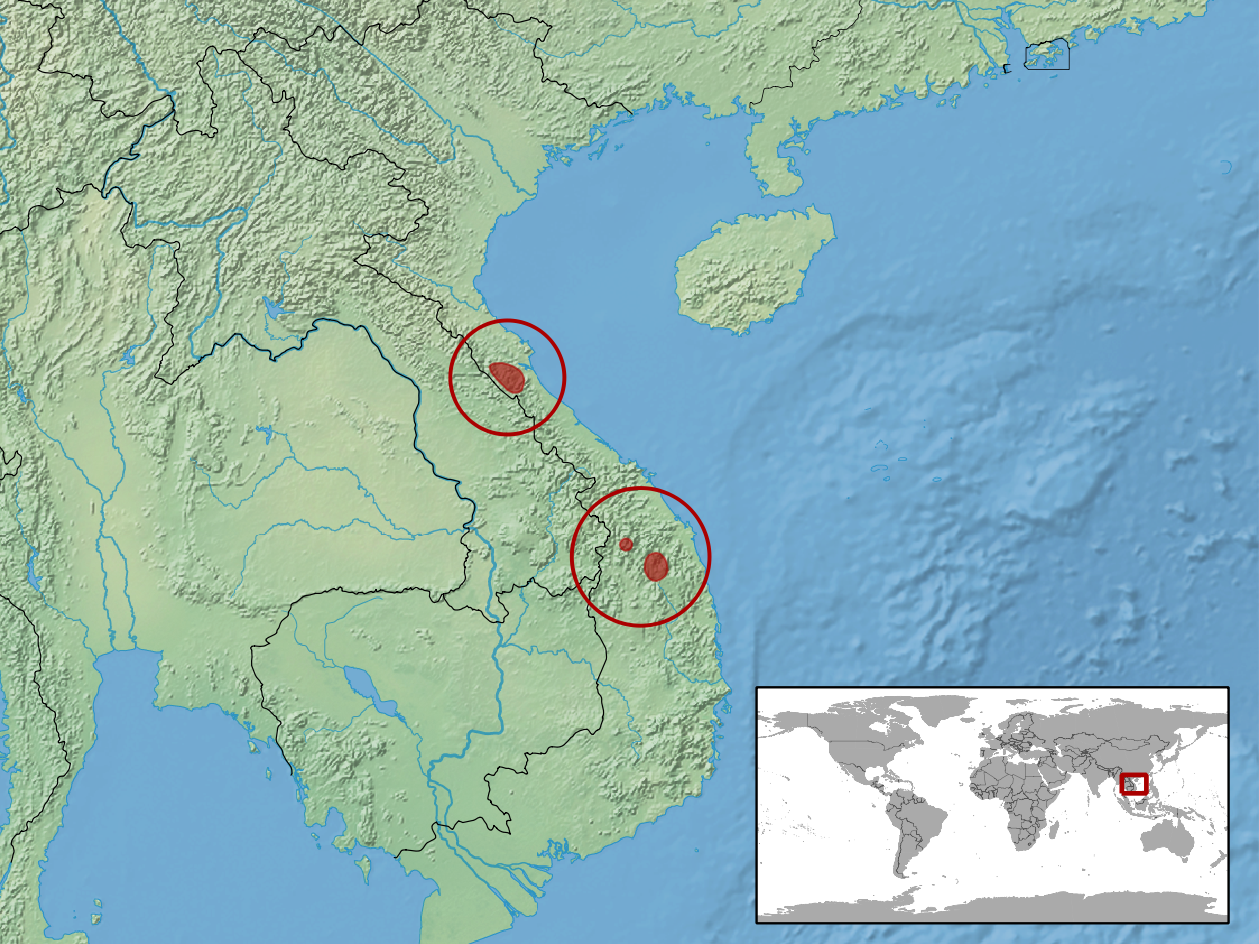
Distribution of Boiga bourreti (Native: Viet Nam)

Boiga bourreti is a species of snake in the family Colubridae. The species is endemic to Vietnam.

== Etymology ==
The specific name, bourreti, is in honor of French herpetologist René Léon Bourret.

== Geographic range ==
B. bourreti is found in central Vietnam between Kon Tum and Quảng Bình provinces. Its true range may extend into adjacent Laos and Cambodia.

== Habitat ==
The preferred natural habitat of B. bourreti is forest, at altitudes of 500–1,500 m (1,600–4,900 ft).

== Description ==
B. bourreti has a wide dark neck band and dorsal scales arranged in 19 rows at midbody.

== Behavior ==
B. bourreti is nocturnal.

== Diet ==
B. bourreti preys upon small vertebrates.

== Reproduction ==
B. bourreti is oviparous.
