= Boiga tanahjampeana =

Conservation status
- Endangered (IUCN 3.1)

Scientific classification
- Kingdom: Animalia
- Phylum: Chordata
- Class: Reptilia
- Order: Squamata
- Suborder: Serpentes
- Family: Colubridae
- Genus: Boiga
- Species: B. tanahjampeana

Binomial name
- Boiga tanahjampeana Orlov & Ryabov, 2002

Species of snake

Boiga tanahjampeana is a species of snake of the family Colubridae.

== Geographic range ==
The snake is found in Indonesia.
