= Harry W. Greene =

American herpetologist (born 1945)

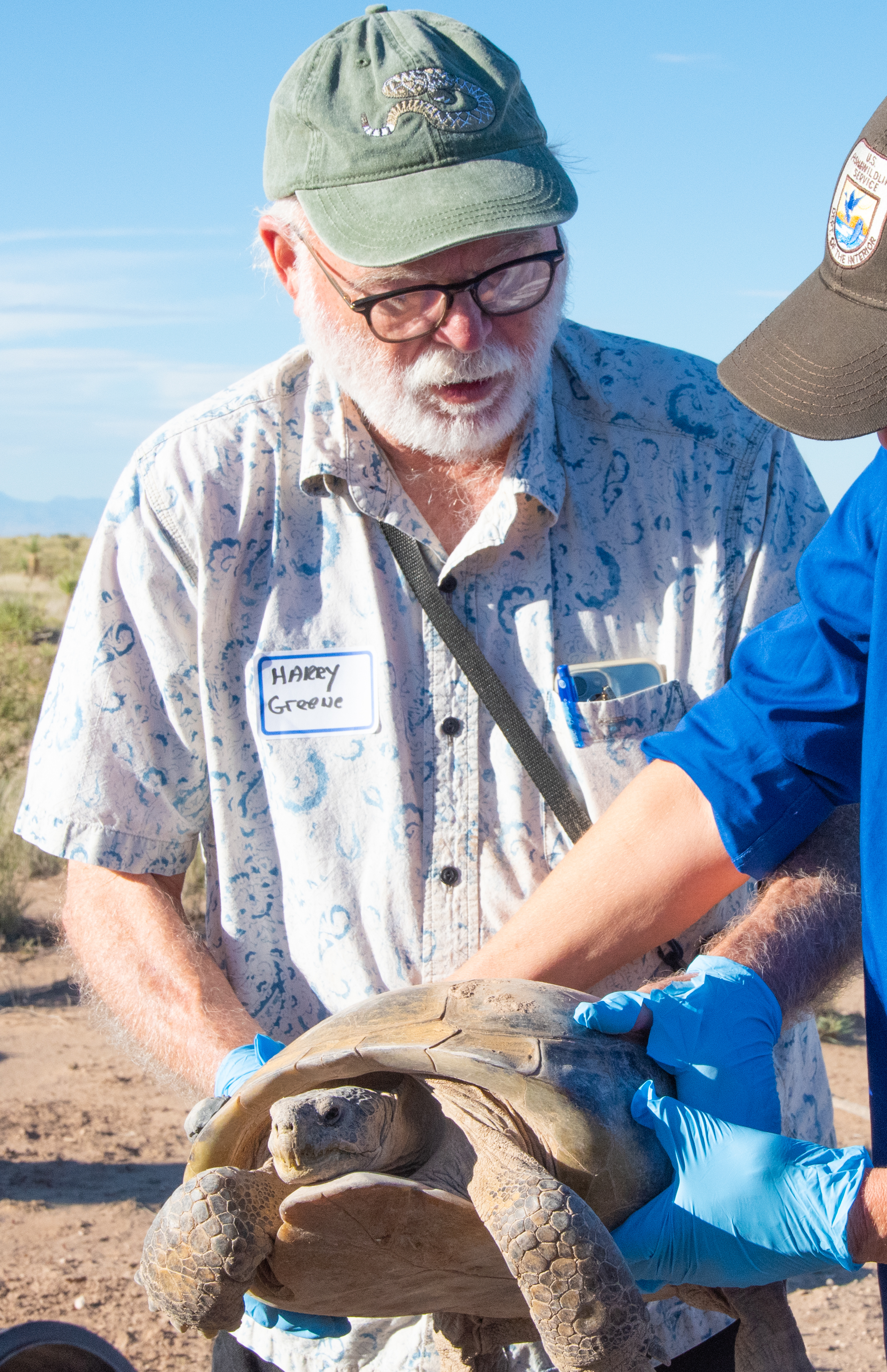
Greene in 2023 with a Bolson tortoise

Harry W. Greene (born September 26, 1945) is an American herpetologist, who retired in 2016 after working for many years as a professor of ecology and evolutionary biology at Cornell University.

== Early life ==
Greene achieved a B.S. in Biology at Texas Wesleyan University in 1968, an M.A. in Biology from the University of Texas at Arlington in 1973, and a PhD in Zoology from the University of Tennessee in 1977. He worked as a US Army medic in Germany in 1968-1971.

== Career ==
Greene has made many scientific publications (about 150 by 2005) and conducted field work in the United States, Europe, Mexico, Central America, South America, Africa and Vietnam. His main areas of research are evolutionary biology, behavioral and community ecology, vertebrate conservation, and feeding and defense in lizards and snakes. He was a researcher for one episode of the 2008 BBC series Life in Cold Blood.

Greene is the Stephen Weiss Presidential Fellow and Professor of Ecology and Evolutionary Biology at Cornell University and the recipient of the E. O. Wilson Award from the American Society of Naturalists. His book Snakes: The Evolution of Mystery in Nature (UC Press), won the PEN Literary Award and was a New York Times Notable Book.

== Books ==
- Snakes: The Evolution of Mystery in Nature (University of California Press, 1997); ISBN 978-0-520-20014-2
- Tracks and Shadows: Field Biology as Art (University of California Press, 2013); ISBN 978-0-520-23275-4
