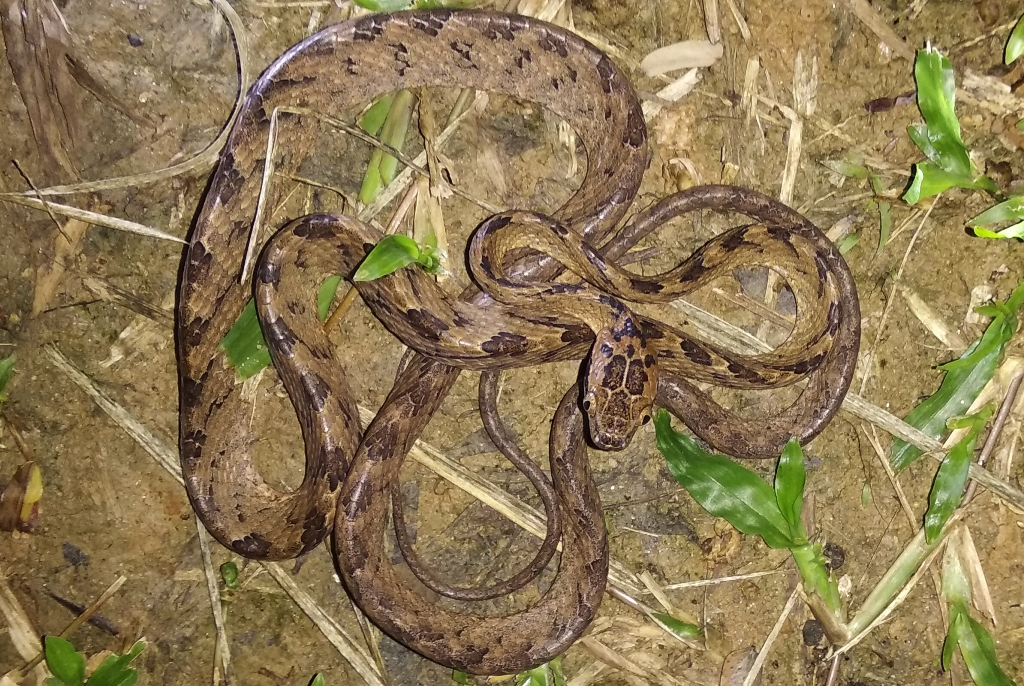

Conservation status
- Least Concern (IUCN 3.1)

Scientific classification
- Kingdom: Animalia
- Phylum: Chordata
- Class: Reptilia
- Order: Squamata
- Suborder: Serpentes
- Family: Colubridae
- Genus: Boiga
- Species: B. ceylonensis

Binomial name
- Boiga ceylonensis (Günther, 1858)

Synonyms
- Dipsadomorphus ceylonensis Günther, 1858; Dipsas ceylonensis Günther, 1864; Dipsadomorphus ceylonensis Boulenger, 1896; Boiga ceylonensis Smith, 1943

= Boiga ceylonensis =

Sri Lanka cat snake

Species of colubrid snake

Boiga ceylonensis (Sri Lanka cat snake) is a species of rear-fanged, mildly venomous, nocturnal, arboreal colubrid snake endemic to Sri Lanka.

== Description ==
This is a thin-bodied, elongate, slim, tree snake. Taxonomic features: Dorsal Scales in 19 rows, oblique; scales along the vertebral row much enlarged, and at mid body nearly as broad as long. Ventrals scales 217–237; the anals are undivided, subcaudals 95–109. The colour is brown or greyish above, with a series of blackish transverse cross bands; nape with a blackish blotch, or three blackish longitudinal streaks, or a transverse bar; a more or less distinct brown crown marking on top of head and a thick streak from the eye to the angle of the mouth; lower parts yellowish, dotted with brown, usually with a lateral series of small brown dots. They are about 4 feet long from tip to tip with the tail 10 inches.

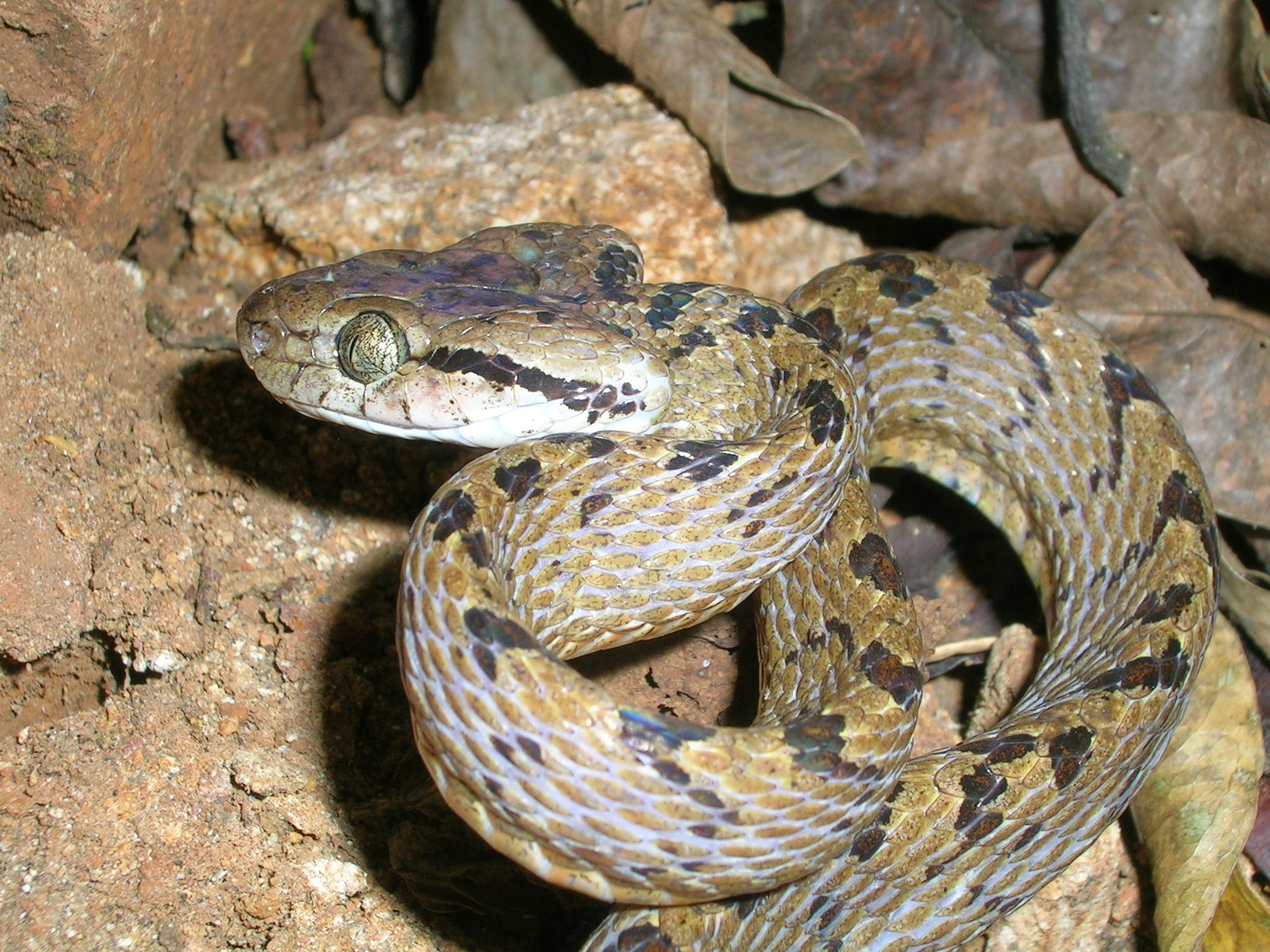

== Distribution range ==
It is an endemic species to Sri Lanka. Previously believed to occur in the Western Ghats of India, but was falsified by recent studies.

== Interaction with humans ==
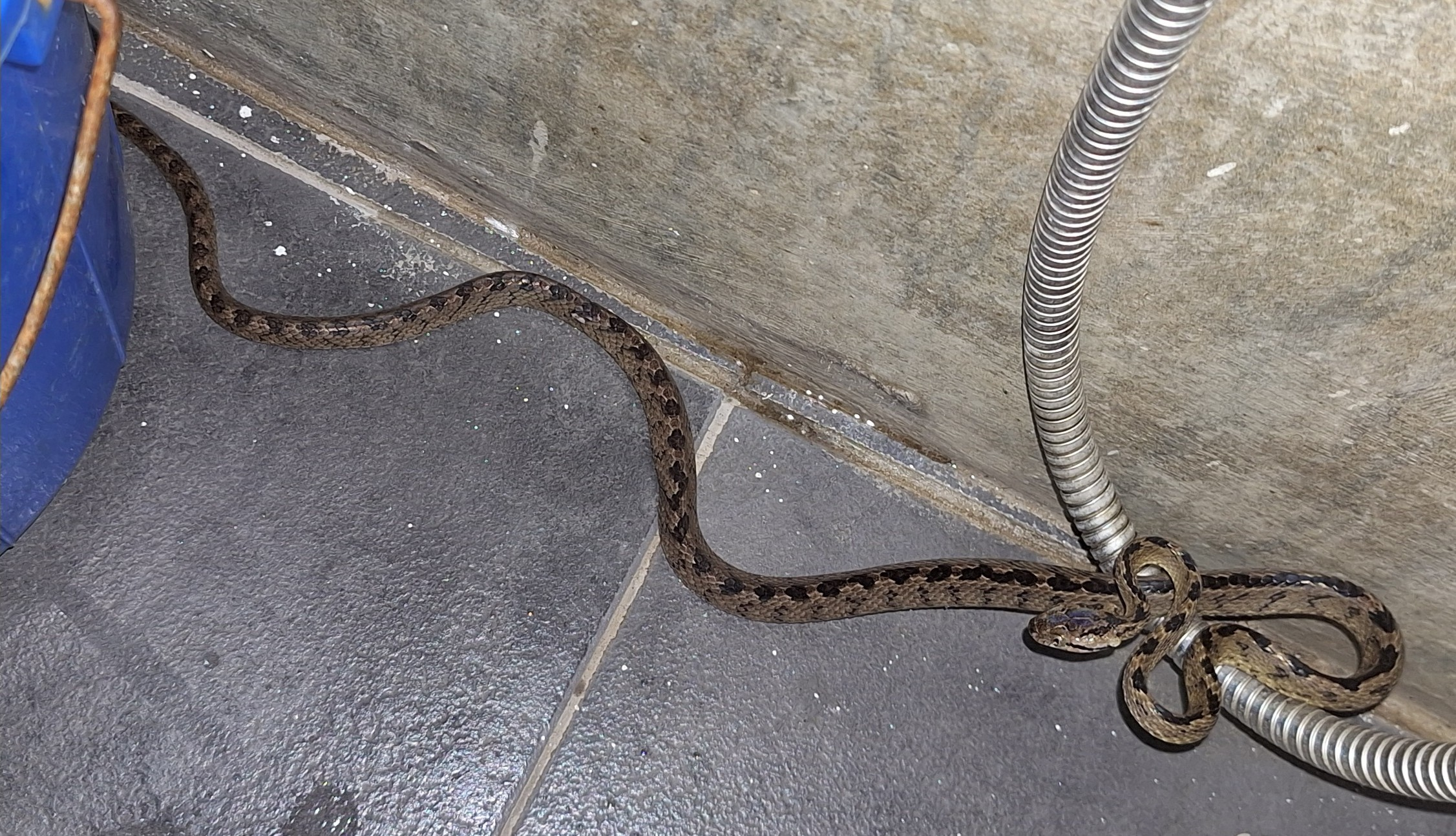
Boiga ceylonensis - a common mildly venomous snake known under the local name "mapila" in Srī Lanka. Here shown hunting for frogs and geckos in the bathroom of a forest dwelling near Hanthāna, Kandy. It managed to enter via shower water outlet pipe. The graceful s-shape of its neck is actually its striking pose!

This snake frequently ventures into human dwellings in search of prey such as geckos. It has a somewhat aggressive disposition and boldly strikes out when disturbed or cornered. This snake is known as Nidi mapila by the Sinhala speaking community of Sri Lanka.

== See also ==
- Boiga barnesii
