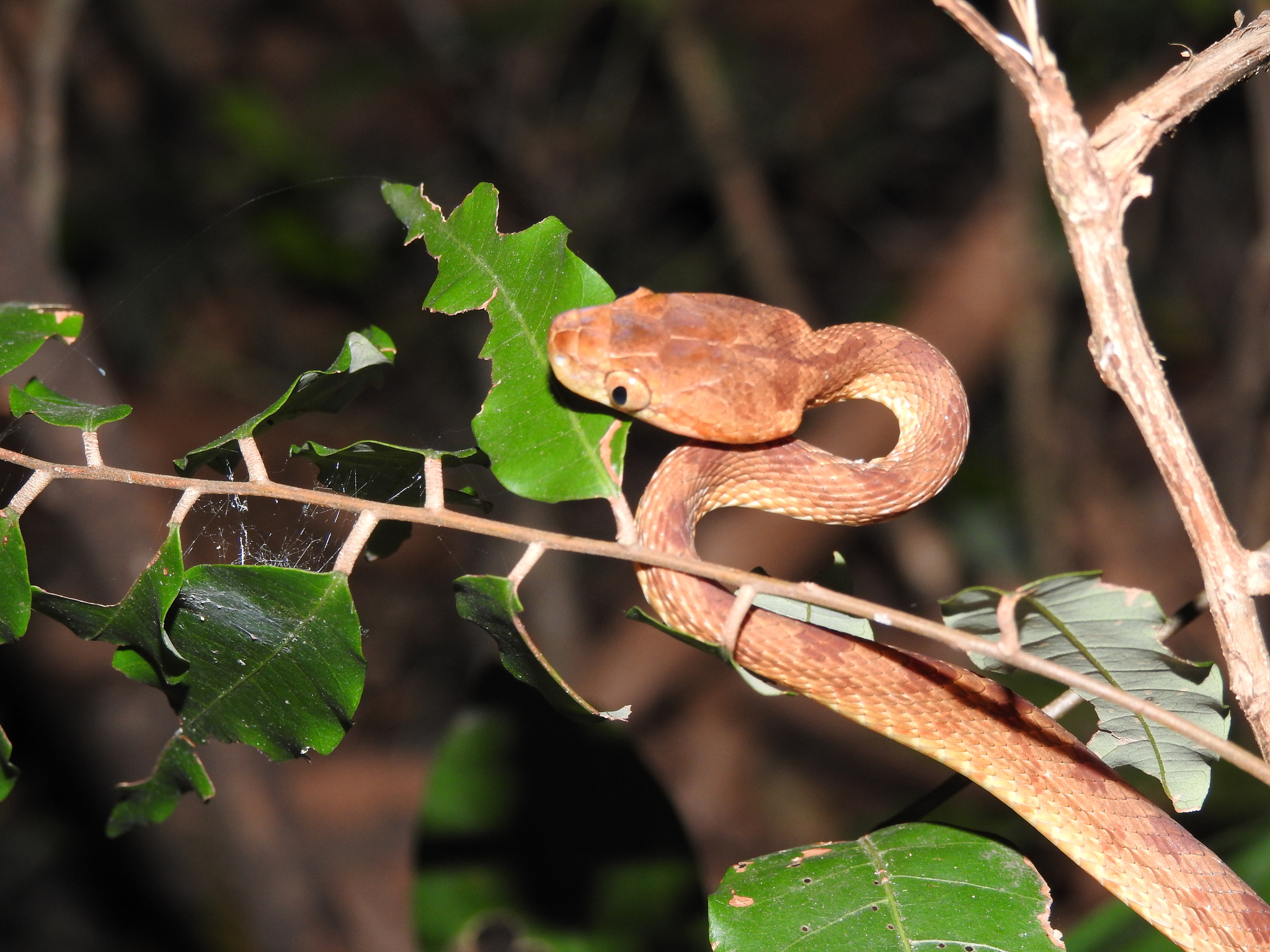
- Tamil Nadu, 2016

Conservation status
- Data Deficient (IUCN 3.1)

Scientific classification
- Kingdom: Animalia
- Phylum: Chordata
- Class: Reptilia
- Order: Squamata
- Suborder: Serpentes
- Family: Colubridae
- Genus: Boiga
- Species: B. dightoni

Binomial name
- Boiga dightoni (Boulenger, 1894)

Synonyms
- Dipsas dightoni Boulenger, 1894; Dipsadomorphus dightonii — Boulenger, 1896; Boiga dightoni — M.A. Smith, 1943

= Boiga dightoni =

Species of snake

Boiga dightoni, commonly known as Dighton's catsnake, the Pirmad cat snake, and the Travancore cat snake, is a species of rear-fanged mildly venomous snake in the family Colubridae. The species is endemic to the Western Ghats of India.

== Etymology ==
The common name, Pirmad cat snake, refers to Peermade (also spelled Peermad, Pirmaad, Pirmed, and Pirmedu), a place in Kerala, India, elevation 3,300 feet (1,006 m).

The specific name or epithet, dightoni, is in honor of tea planter S.M. Dighton, the collector of the holotype specimen.

== Geographic range ==
In India B. dightoni is found in the Ponmudi Hills and Travancore Hills of Kerala State, and in the Anaimalai Hills and Palni Hills of western Tamil Nadu State.

== Description ==
B. dightoni is pale reddish-brown dorsally, with a series of salmon-red blotches. Its head is pale brown with minute blackish dots. Ventrally, it is yellowish, finely-dotted with brown. The outer ends of the ventral scales are salmon-pink. It is medium-sized, adults attaining a total length (including tail) of 1.1 m (3.6 feet).

== Behavior ==
B. dightoni is arboreal and nocturnal.

== Habitat ==
B. dightoni inhabits trees and shrubs in forested areas, at altitudes of 800–1,100 m (2,600–3,600 ft).

== Diet ==
B. dightoni preys on lizards, including Calotes versicolor.

== Reproduction ==
B. dightoni is oviparous.

== Venom ==
Although rear-fanged and possessing a mild venom, B. dightoni is not considered dangerous to humans, mainly due to its small size.
