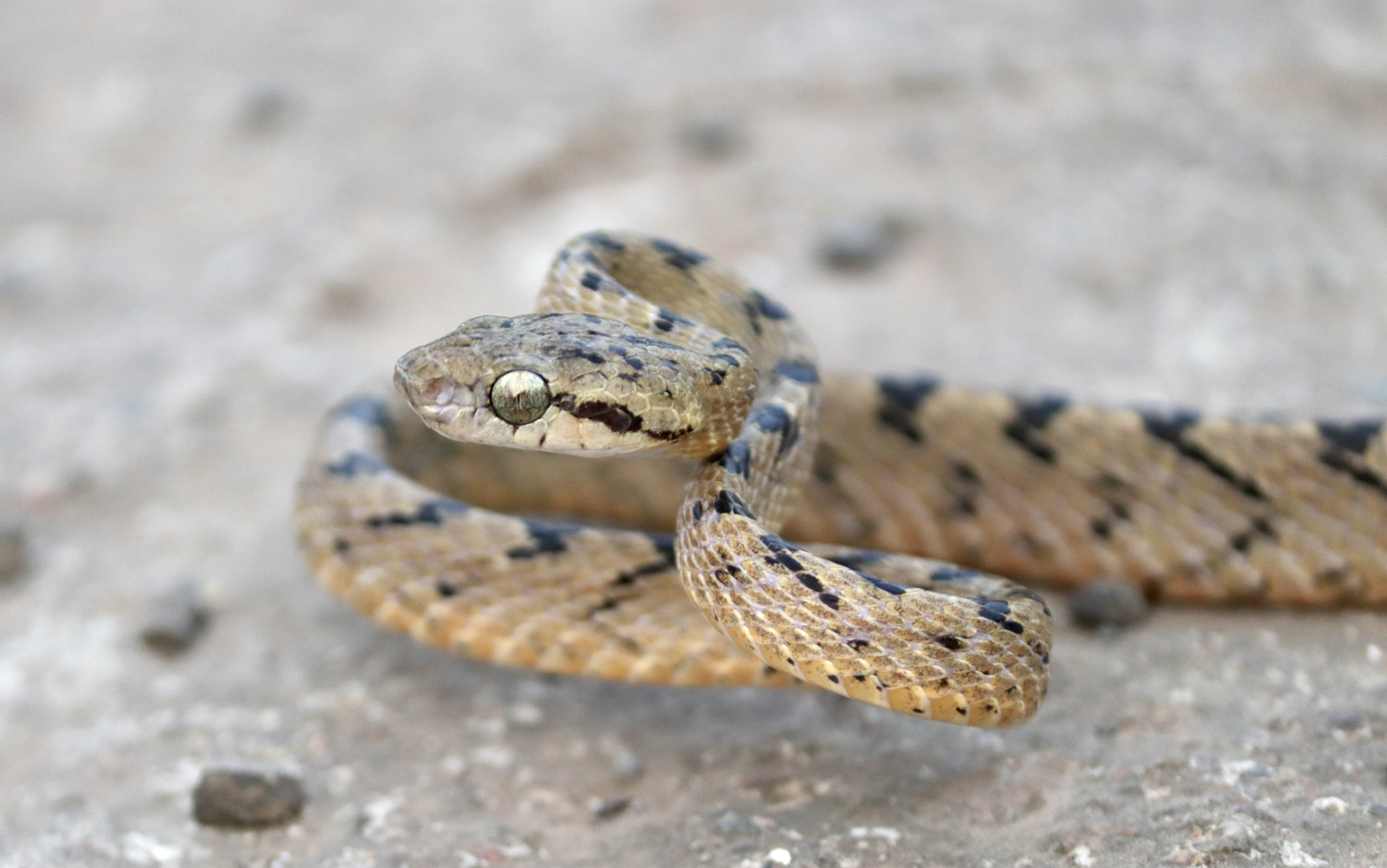

Conservation status
- Least Concern (IUCN 3.1)

Scientific classification
- Kingdom: Animalia
- Phylum: Chordata
- Class: Reptilia
- Order: Squamata
- Suborder: Serpentes
- Family: Colubridae
- Genus: Boiga
- Species: B. beddomei

Binomial name
- Boiga beddomei (Wall, 1909)
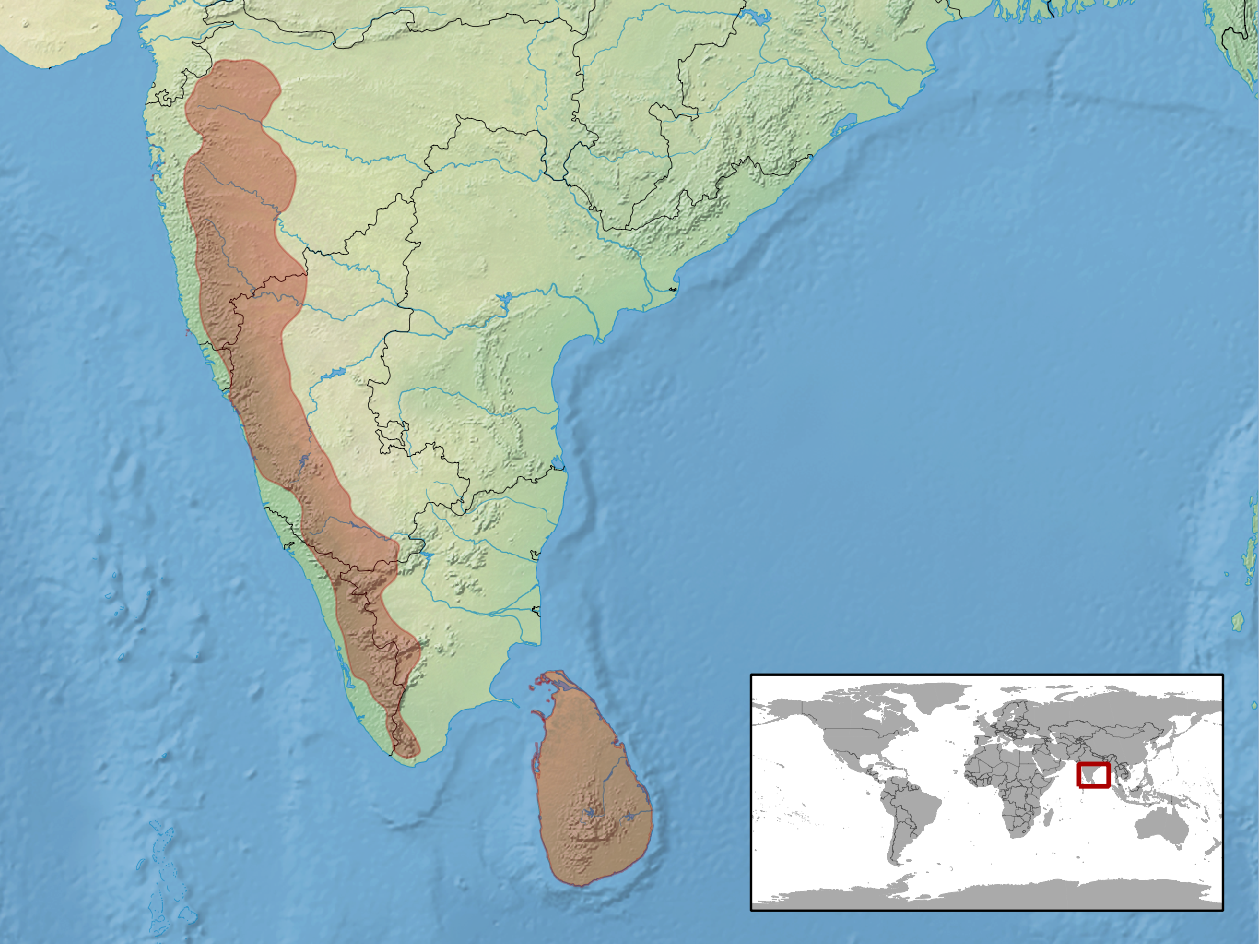

Synonyms
- Dipsadomorphus beddomei Wall, 1909; Boiga beddomei Das, 1996

= Boiga beddomei =

Species of snake

Boiga beddomei, commonly known as Beddome's cat snake, is a species of rear-fanged snake in the family Colubridae. The species is endemic to the Western Ghats of India, in Maharashtra, Gujarat and Goa states.

== Geographic range ==
B. beddomei is found in India, in northern parts of the Western Ghats in Maharashtra state (Bhimashankar, Mulshi, Koyna, Vasota). It is also found in Gujarat, Goa and northern karnataka in the hill ranges.

== Etymology ==
Boiga beddomei is named after Richard Henry Beddome (1830–1911), British army officer and botanist.

== Description ==
Boiga beddomei is a slender snake. The head is distinct from the neck. The vertebral scales are strongly enlarged. The dorsum is grayish brown with dark brown vertebral cross bars. The ventral surface is yellowish-cream, densely powdered with blackish spots.

=== Scalation ===
The dorsal scales are arranged in 19 oblique rows at midbody; the vertebral row is strongly enlarged and hexagonal. The ventrals number 238–252 and the subcaudals number 113–127.

== Habitat ==
The preferred natural habitat of B. beddomei is evergreen forest, at altitudes up to 1,000 m (3,300 ft). It is nocturnal and arboreal in habits.

== Diet ==
B. beddomei feeds mainly on dragon lizard, geckos, skinks and frogs.

== Reproduction ==
B. beddomei is oviparous.
