= List of reptiles of Nepal =

This List of reptiles of Nepal presents reptile species recorded in Nepal.

== Order: Crocodilia ==
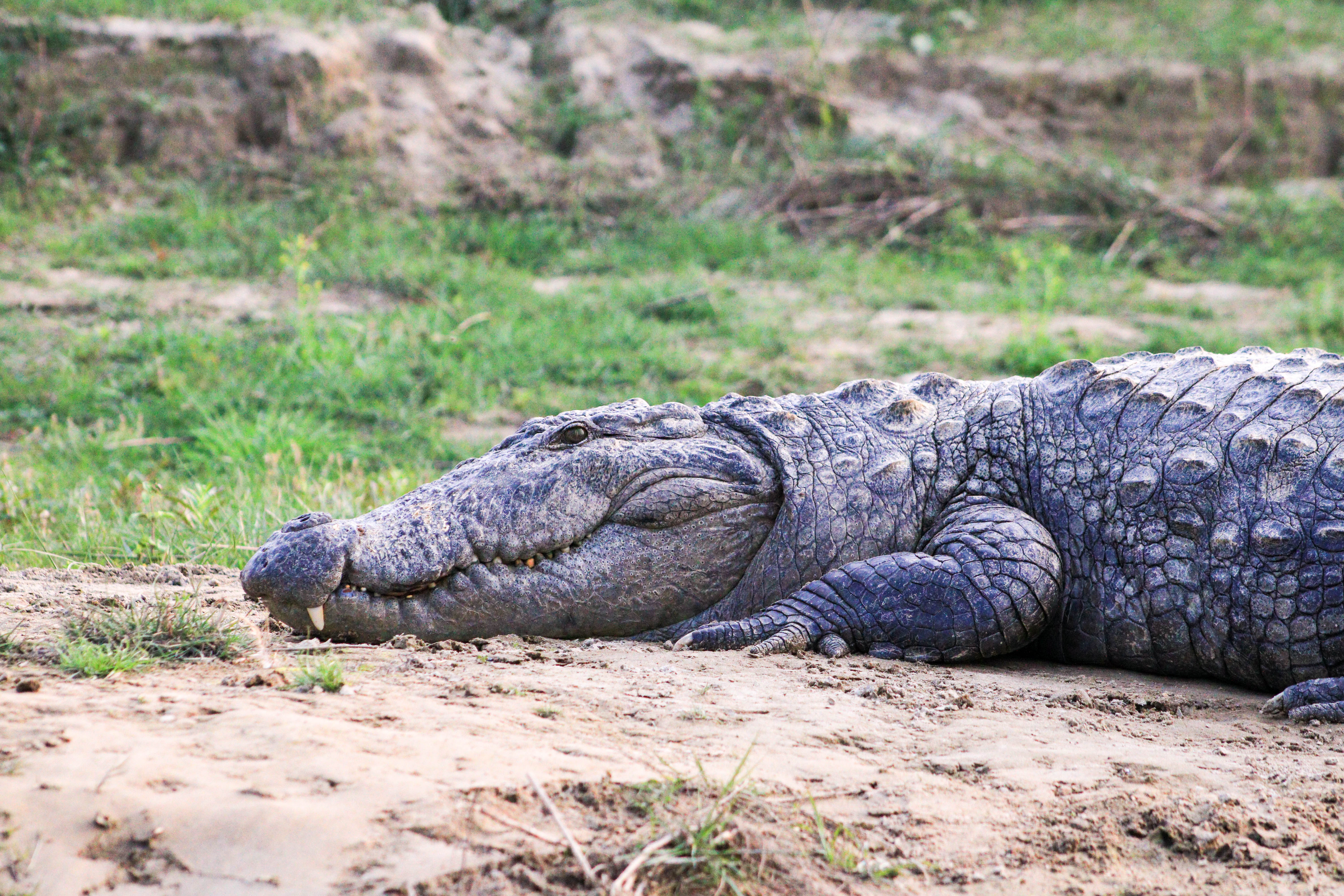
Mugger crocodile at Chitwan National Park

- Family: Crocodilidae
  - Mugger crocodile (Crocodylus palustris)
- Family: Gavialiidae
  - Gharial (Gavialis gangeticus)

== Order: Testudines ==
- Family: Testudinidae
  - Elongated tortoise (Indotestudo elongata)
- Family: Geoemydidae
  - Red-crowned roofed turtle (Batagur kachuga)
  - Three-striped roofed turtle (Batagur dhongoka)
  - Black pond turtle (Geoclemys hamiltonii)
  - Brown roofed turtle (Pangshura smithii)
  - Tricarinate hill turtle (Melanochelys tricarinata)
  - Indian black turtle (Melanochelys trijuga)
  - Indian roofed turtle (Pangshura tecta)
  - Indian tent turtle (Pangshura tentoria)
  - Brahminy river turtle (Hardella thurjii)
  - Assam leaf turtle (Cyclemys gemeli)
  - Indian eyed turtle (Morenia petersi)
- Family: Trionychidae
  - Indian softshell turtle (Nilssonia gangetica)
  - Indian peacock softshell turtle (Nilssonia hurum)
  - Indian narrow-headed softshell turtle (Chitra indica)
  - Indian flapshell turtle (Lissemys punctata)

== Order: Squamata ==
=== Suborder: Lacertilia ===
- Family: Gekkonidae
  - Baluch rock gecko (Bunopus tuberculatus)
  - Flat-tailed house gecko (Hemidactylus platyurus)
  - Indo-Pacific gecko (Hemidactylus garnotii)
  - Brook's house gecko (Hemidactylus brookii)
  - Northern house gecko (Hemidactylus flaviviridis)
  - Tokay gecko (Gekko gekko)
  - Spotted house gecko (Gekko monarchus)
  - Nepalese rock gecko (Cyrtodactylus nepalensis)
  - Himalayan bent-toed gecko (Cyrtodactylus himalayanus)
- Family: Eublepharidae
  - Common leopard gecko (Eublepharis macularius)
- Family: Agamidae
  - Oriental garden lizard (Calotes versicolor)
  - Kashmir rock agama (Laudakia tuberculata)
  - Variegated mountain lizard (Japalura variegata)
  - Dark sitana (Sitana fusca)
  - Siwalik sitana (Sitana sivalensis)
- Family: Scincidae
  - Bronze grass skink (Eutropis macularia)
  - Many-keeled grass skink (Eutropis carinata)
  - Striped grass mabuya (Eutropis dissimilis)
  - Ladakh supple skink (Asymblepharus ladacensis)
  - Sikkim ground skink (Asymblepharus sikimmensis)
  - Reeve's smooth skink (Scincella reevesii)
  - Large ground skink (Scincella capitenea)
  - Indian forest skink (Sphenomorphus indicus)
  - Spotted forest skink (Sphenomorphus maculatus)
  - White-spotted supple skink (Lygosoma albopunctatum)
  - Common snake skink (Lygosoma punctara)
- Family: Varanidae
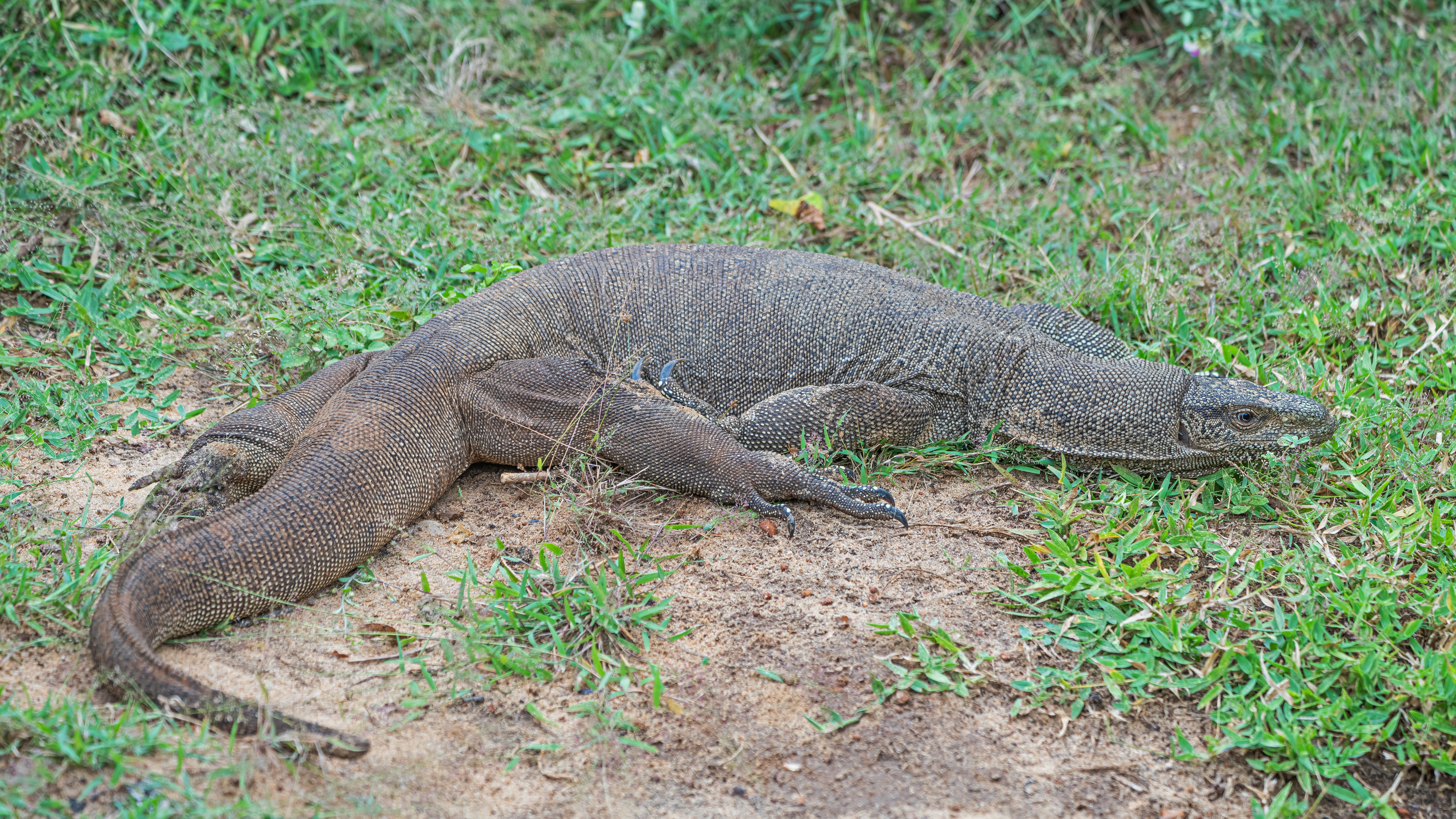
  Bengal monitor (Varanus bengalensis)
  - Bengal monitor (Varanus bengalensis)
  - Yellow monitor (Varanus flavescens)

=== Suborder: Anguimorpha ===
- Family: Anguidae
  - Asian glass lizard (Dopasia gracilis)

=== Suborder: Serpentes ===
- Family: Boidae
  - Russell's boa (Eryx conicus)
  - Red sand boa (Eryx johnii)
- Family: Pythonidae
  - Indian rock python (Python molurus)
  - Burmese python (Python bivittatus)
- Family: Elapidae
  - Common krait (Bungarus caeruleus)
  - Banded krait (Bungarus fasciatus)
  - Northeastern hill krait (Bungarus bungaroides)
  - Lesser black krait (Bunagrus lividus)
  - Greater black krait (Bungarus niger)
  - Sind krait (Bungarus sindanus)
  - MacClelland's coral snake (Sinomicrurus macclellandi)
  - Spectacled cobra (Naja naja)
  - Monocled cobra (Naja kaouthia)
  - King cobra (Ophiophagus hannah)
- Family: Typhlopidae
  - Brahminy blind snake (Indotyphlops braminus)
- Family: Gerrhopilidae
  - Wall's worm snake (Gerrhopilus oligolepis)
- Family: Viperidae
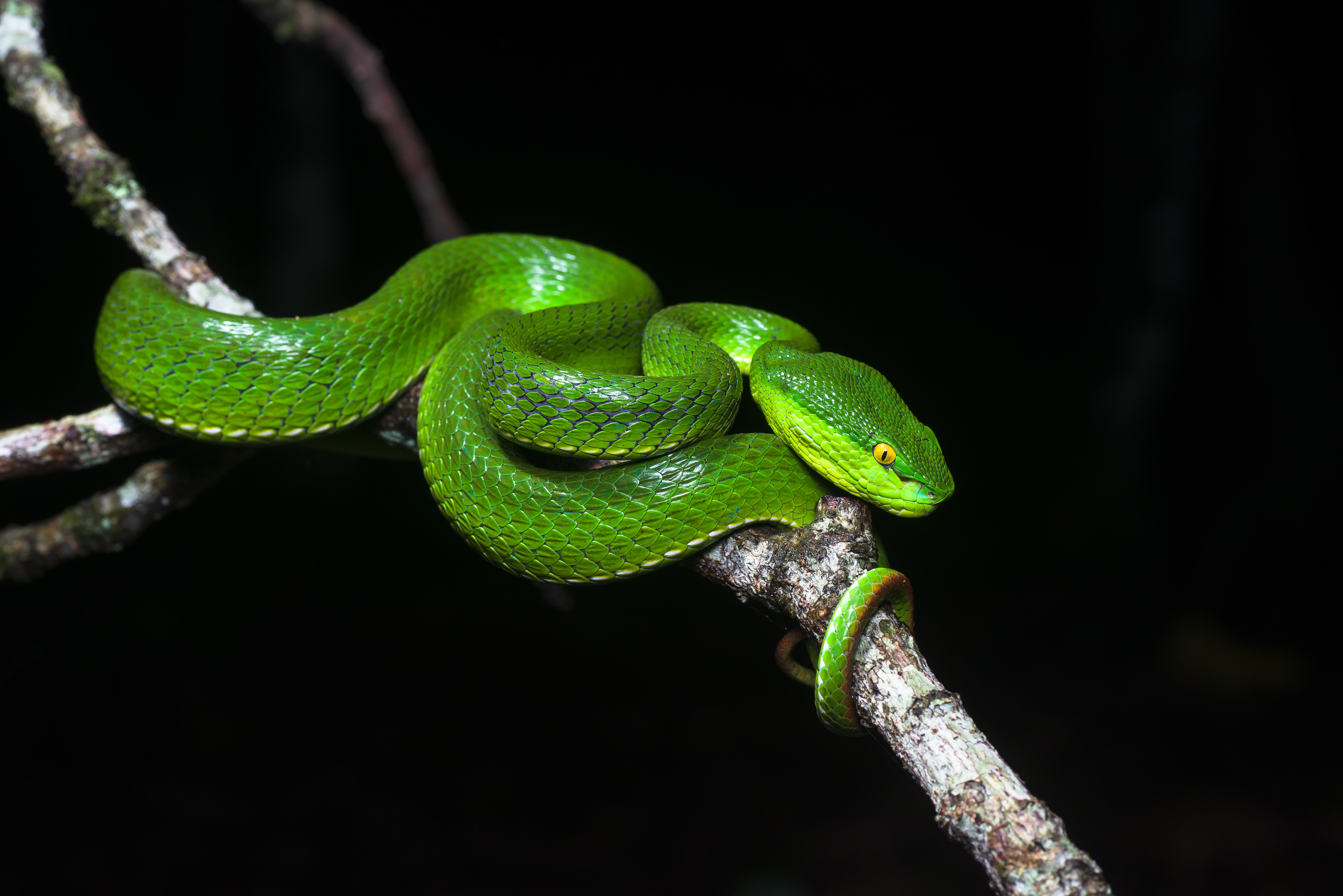
  White-lipped pit viper (female Trimeresurus albolabris)
  - Himalayan pit viper (Gloydius himalayanus)
  - Saw-scaled viper (Echis carinatus)
  - White-lipped pit viper (Trimeresurus albolabris)
  - Common green pit viper (Trimeresurus gramineus)
  - Tibetan bamboo pit viper (Trimeresurus tibetanus)
  - Chinese pit viper (Trimeresurus stejnegeri)
  - Large-eyed pit viper (Trimeresurus macrops)
  - Russell's viper (Daboia russelii)
  - Mountain pit viper (Ovophis monticola)
  - Oriental pit viper (Protobothrops jerdonii)
  - Strauch's pit viper (Gloydius strauchi)
- Family: Colubridae
  - Checkered keelback (Fowlea piscator)
  - St. John's keelback (Fowlea sanctijohannis)
  - Indian egg-eating snake (Elachistodon westermanni)
  - Red-necked keelback (Rhabdophis subminiatus)
  - Oriental ratsnake (Ptyas mucosa)
  - Green rat snake (Ptyas nigromarginata)
  - Radiated ratsnake (Coelognathus radiatus)
  - Trinket snake (Coelognathus helena)
  - Oriental wolf snake (Lycodon capucinus)
  - Indian wolf snake (Lycodon aulicus)
  - Northern wolf snake (Lycodon striatus)
  - Banded kukri snake (Oligodon arnensis)
  - Cantor's kukri snake (Oligodon cyclurus)
  - Banded racer (Argyrogena fasciolata)
  - Beauty rat snake (Elaphe taeniura)
  - Eastern trinket snake (Elaphe cantoris)
  - Hodgson's rat snake (Elaphe hodgsoni)
  - Forsten's cat snake (Boiga forsteni)
  - Green cat snake (Boiga cyanea)
  - Common cat snake (Boiga trigonata)
  - Tawny cat snake (Boiga ochracea)
  - Buff striped keelback (Amphiesma stolatum)
  - Painted keelback (Xenochrophis cerasogaster)
  - Orange-collared keelback (Rhabdophis himalayanus)
  - Cantor's black-headed snake (Sibynophis sagittarius)
  - Sikkim keelback (Herpetoreas sieboldii)
  - Himalayan keelback (Herpetoreas platyceps)
  - Blackbelly worm-eating snake (Trachischium fuscum)
  - Rosebelly worm-eating snake (Trachischium guentheri)
  - Mountain worm-eating snake (Trachischium monticola)
  - Olive oriental worm-eating snake (Trachischium laeve)
  - Yellowbelly worm-eating snake (Trachischium tenuiceps)
