= Shivapuri Nagarjun National Park =

National Park of Nepal

- Nepali: शिवपुरी नागार्जुन राष्ट्रिय निकुञ्ज
- IUCN category II (national park)
- View of Shivapuri Nagarjun National Park

- Location within Bagmati Province Location within Nepal Location within South Asia
- Interactive map of Shivapuri Nagarjun National Park
- Location: Nepal
- Nearest city: Kathmandu
- Coordinates: 27°47′42″N 85°23′24″E
- Area: 159 km^{2} (61 sq mi)
- Established: 2002
- Governing body: Department of National Parks and Wildlife Conservation (Nepal)

Shivapuri Nagarjun National Park is the ninth national park in Nepal and was established in 2002. It is located in the country's mid-hills on the northern fringe of the Kathmandu Valley and named after Shivapuri Peak at 2,732 m (8,963 ft) altitude. It covers an area of 159 km^{2} (61 sq mi) in the districts of Kathmandu, Nuwakot and Sindhupalchowk, adjoining 23 Village Development Committees. In the west, the protected area extends to the Dhading District.

== History ==
The area has historically been an important water catchment region, supplying the Kathmandu Valley with freshwater through the Bagmati and Bishnumati river systems. The watershed is an important source of drinking water for the valley and contributes to groundwater recharge, irrigation and other water requirements.

The area's conservation history dates to 1976, when the Shivapuri Watershed Conservation Area was established to protect the watersheds of the Bagmati and Bishnumati rivers from deforestation and encroachment. It was designated as the Shivapuri Protected Watershed Area in 1978 and the Shivapuri Watershed and Wildlife Reserve in 1983. In 2002, an area of 144 km^{2} (56 sq mi) was declared Shivapuri National Park. In 2009, the park was expanded to include the 15 km^{2} (5.8 sq mi) Nagarjun Forest Reserve, bringing its total area to 159 km^{2} (61 sq mi), and it was renamed Shivapuri Nagarjun National Park. In 2016, a buffer zone covering 118.61 km^{2} (45.80 sq mi) was established around the park to encourage community participation in conservation and the sustainable management of natural resources.

The park contains several historical and religious sites associated with Hinduism and Buddhism, including Baghdwar, Vishnudwar, Nagi Gompa and Jamacho Gumba. Baghdwar is traditionally regarded as the source of the Bagmati River and attracts pilgrims, particularly during religious observances. The park is also a popular destination for hiking and trekking because of its proximity to Kathmandu. Routes to Shivapuri Peak, Chisapani and Jamacho attract local visitors and tourists, while the trail through Sundarijal and Chisapani provides access towards the Helambu region.

== Climate ==
Shivapuri Nagarjun National Park experiences a subtropical to temperate climate, with climatic conditions varying according to elevation and topography. The park's elevation ranges from approximately 914 to 2,731 m (2,999 to 8,960 ft) above sea level, resulting in warmer conditions in the lower foothills and cooler temperatures in the higher mountainous regions. The lower elevations are characterised by a subtropical climate, while the upper reaches experience a temperate climate.

The park receives most of its annual precipitation during the summer monsoon, which generally lasts from June to September. The average annual rainfall has been reported at approximately 2,727 mm (107.4 in). The monsoon contributes to the area's dense vegetation and replenishes its numerous streams and water sources. Rainfall and humidity decrease during the post-monsoon and winter months, resulting in relatively dry conditions.

According to 30 years of climatic observations (1992–2022) recorded at the Budhanilkantha weather station, situated at an elevation of 1,378 m (4,521 ft), the average annual maximum temperature is 23.15 °C (73.67 °F), while the average annual minimum temperature is 11.93 °C (53.47 °F). Temperatures generally rise from March and remain relatively high during the summer and monsoon months before declining after September. August records the highest monthly temperatures, while average minimum temperatures fall below 10 °C (50 °F) between November and February.

The variation in temperature, rainfall and elevation contributes to the park's diverse forest ecosystems, supporting both subtropical vegetation at lower elevations and temperate forests in its upper regions.

== Vegetation ==
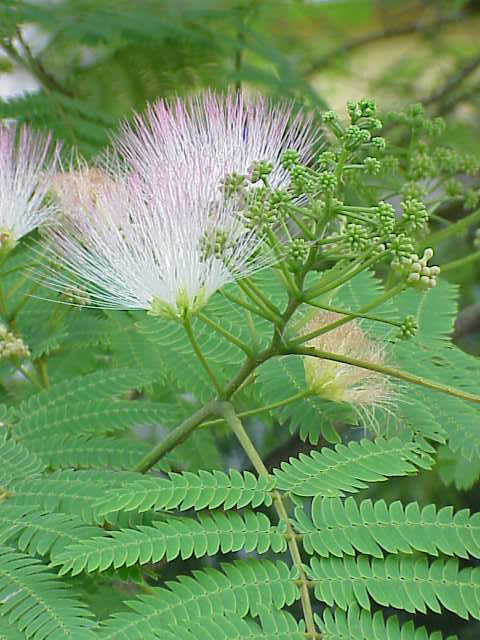
Persian silk tree occurs in the park

The typical vegetation of the park is middle hill forest from 1,000 to 1,800 m (3,300 to 5,900 ft) of altitude, consisting of:

- Himalayan subtropical broadleaf forests in the lower and upper subtropical bioclimatic zone dominated by Schima-Castanopsis associations, with chir pine stands on southern dry ridges and associations of alder, wild Himalayan cherry, Engelhardia and ring-cupped oak along streams;
- Eastern Himalayan broadleaf forests in the lower temperate bioclimatic zone with predominantly broadleaf evergreen species of oak and laurel families mixed with rhododendron on northern slopes.

In higher elevations, a variety of medicinal herbs prosper. Botanists have recorded 129 species of mushrooms and 2,122 floral species, out of which 449 are vascular and 16 are endemic plants.

== Fauna ==
Himalayan black bear, a species found in high densities in the park

Golden jackal inhabiting Shivapuri Nagarjun National Park

Hoopoe

Since 2002 several surveys have been carried out to determine the faunal diversity of the protected area. In a field study carried out from July 2003 to July 2004, Indian leopard, jungle cat, large Indian civet, golden jackal, Himalayan black bear, yellow-throated marten, small Indian mongoose, Himalayan goral, Indian muntjac, wild boar, rhesus monkey, Hanuman langur, Chinese pangolin, Indian crested porcupine, Royle's pika, Indian hare, orange-bellied Himalayan squirrel, fawn-colored mouse, Hodgsons's brown-toothed shrew and black rat were identified. Clouded leopard, leopard cat, masked palm civet, crab-eating mongoose, Indian pangolin, rhesus macaque and yellow-throated marten, were photographed by camera traps in 2010.

In the western part of the park, herpetologists encountered monocled cobra, Himalayan keelback, olive Oriental slender snake, yellow-bellied worm-eating snake, variegated mountain lizard, Oriental garden lizard, many-keeled grass skink, Sikkim skink, black-spined toad, long-legged cricket frog and horned frog in the summer of 2009.

Ornithologists recorded 318 species of birds including Eurasian eagle-owl, slender-billed scimitar-babbler, white-gorgeted flycatcher, barred cuckoo-dove and golden-throated barbet.

== Threats ==
Shivapuri Nagarjun National Park faces several threats to its biodiversity and natural habitats. Illegal hunting, poaching and the collection of forest resources remain conservation concerns, particularly in areas where local communities depend on the park for fuelwood, timber, fodder and other forest products. Human–wildlife conflict is another significant challenge, with wild animals entering surrounding settlements and agricultural areas, resulting in damage to crops and property.

Forest fires, particularly in pine-dominated forests during the dry season, pose a recurring threat to wildlife habitats and vegetation. The park's management plan recorded nine accidental forest fire incidents during fiscal year 2078/79 (2021–2022). Other environmental pressures include garbage pollution in rivers and wetland habitats, unsustainable extraction of water resources and the potential effects of climate change on biodiversity.

Encroachment, unplanned construction and changing land-use patterns in the buffer zone also place pressure on the park's surrounding ecosystems. The extraction of stone, sand and soil, together with infrastructure development, can contribute to habitat degradation and disturbances to the natural environment. Increasing tourism pressure at popular hiking destinations is another management concern.
