= Transmembrane protein 254 =

Mammalian protein found in Homo sapiens

TMEM254

Identifiers
- Aliases: TMEM254, C10orf57, bA369J21.6, transmembrane protein 254
- External IDs: MGI: 1196450; HomoloGene: 11838; GeneCards: TMEM254; OMA:TMEM254 - orthologs

Gene location (Human)
Chr.	Chromosome 10 (human)
Band	10q22.3	Start	80,078,646 bp
Band	10q22.3	End	80,092,557 bp

Gene location (Mouse)
Chr.	Chromosome 14 (mouse)
Band	14 A3|14 15.19 cM	Start	25,923,300 bp
Band	14 A3|14 15.19 cM	End	25,927,672 bp
RNA expression pattern
Bgee	Human / Mouse (ortholog); Top expressed in: right uterine tube; skin of abdomen; skin of leg; right testis; rectum; olfactory zone of nasal mucosa; left testis; bronchial epithelial cell; skin of arm; right lobe of liver / Top expressed in: vasculature of organ; right kidney; esophagus; proximal tubule; choroid plexus; liver; urethra; human kidney; choroid plexus of fourth ventricle; lip; More reference expression data
BioGPS	n/a
Orthologs
Species	Human	Mouse
Entrez	80195	66039
Ensembl	ENSG00000133678	ENSMUSG00000072676
UniProt	Q8TBM7	P0DN89; P0DN90; P0DN91
RefSeq (mRNA)	NM_001270367; NM_001270368; NM_001270369; NM_001270370; NM_001270371 NM_001270372; NM_001270373; NM_001270374; NM_025125	NM_025311; NM_026679
RefSeq (protein)	NP_001257296; NP_001257297; NP_001257298; NP_001257299; NP_001257300 NP_001257301; NP_001257302; NP_001257303; NP_079401	NP_001257424.1; NP_001257427.1; NP_080955.1; NP_001257424; NP_001257425 NP_079587; NP_080955; NP_079587; NP_080955; NP_001257427; NP_001257428; NP_001257424; NP_001257425; NP_001257427; NP_001257428; NP_079587; NP_080955
Location (UCSC)	Chr 10: 80.08 – 80.09 Mb	Chr 14: 25.92 – 25.93 Mb
PubMed search
- Wikidata
View/Edit Human	View/Edit Mouse

Transmembrane protein 254 is a transmembrane protein that is encoded by the TMEM254 gene, it is predicted to have many orthologs across eukaryotes.

== Gene ==
TMEM254 is located on the long arm of chromosome 10, open reading frame 57 on the positive strand. It is found at position 10q22.3. It has seven known transcript variants.

This image shows the cytogenetic band of human chromosome 10 and the various gene locations on it. TMEM254 can be seen at the thin red band with the box around, placed at q22.3.

== mRNA ==
TMEM254 consists of ten total exons and is 13,912 bp in length.

Isoforms TMEM254 has 3 isoforms produced by alternative splicing.

Isoform	Length	Mass (Da)
1	123	14,243
2	84	9,692
3	103	12,068

== Protein ==
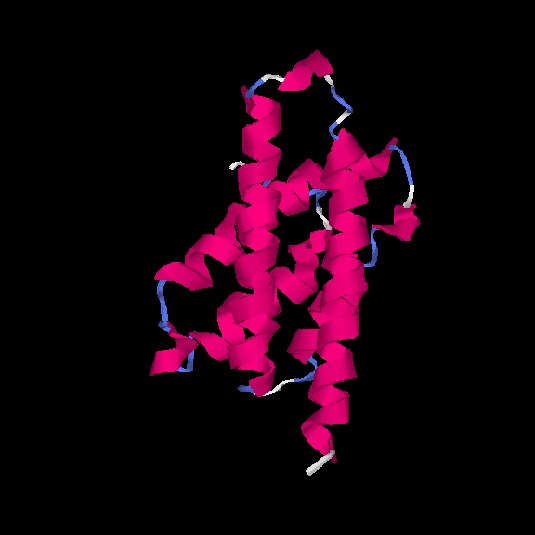
Predicted structure of TMEM254 derived from I-TASSER

TMEM254 contains:

- 147 amino acids.
- Five transmembrane domains
- Molecular weight 16.4 kilodaltons
- Isoelectric point 9.39
- domain of unknown function 4499 (DUF4499) region

The secondary structure of TMEM254 is predicted to consist of alternating pairs of alpha helices and beta sheets.

== Expression ==
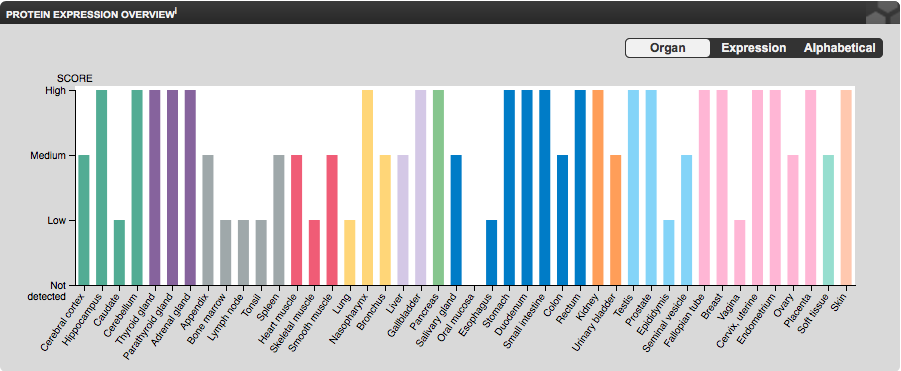
Human Protein Atlas shows TMEM254 expression.

According to a human GEO profile and human and mouse EST profiles, TMEM254 appears to be expressed at a relatively high level in most tissues.

TMEM254 is highly expressed in reproductive structures, and a wide range of cells. These include, but are not limited to, thyroid gland, pancreas, kidney, skin, breasts, and testes.

== Homology ==
There are no known paralogs for transmembrane protein 254, however it does have various orthologs within orthologs within eukaryotes. The following table presents some of the orthologs found using searches in BLAST. A comparison of a wide variety of known TMEM254 orthologs meant to display the diversity of species for which orthologs are found is listed in the table below:

Organism	Common name	Divergence from Humans (MYA)	Accession number	Sequence length	Sequence identity	Sequence similarity	Notes
Homo sapiens	Humans	N/A	NP_001257296	N/A	100%	100%	Mammalia
Pan troglodytes	Chimpanzee	6.40	XP_003312695	6.4	99.3%	99.3%	Mammalia
Rhinopithecus bieti	Black snub-nosed monkey	28.1	XP_011886260	28.1	95.2%	97.3%	Mammalia
Chrysemys pictabellii	Painted Turtle	320	XP_008168753	320	46.3%	57.8%	Reptilia
Esox lucius	Northern Pike	320	NP_001290628	432	45%	60.4%	Actinopterygii
Alligator mississippiensis	American Alligator	320	KYO27663	320	43.3%	56.7%	Reptilia
Nanorana parkeri	High Himalaya frog	353	XP_018428933	353	42.3%	57.7%	Amphibia
Phaethon lepturus	White-tailed Tropicbird	320	XP_010286446	320	38.8%	59.3%	Aves
Hippocampus comes	Tiger Tail Seahorse	432	XP_019737413	432	38.1%	56.5%	Actinopterygii
Callorhinchus milii	Elephant Shark	465	XP_007897415	465	37.9%	58.2%	Chondrichthyes
Patagioenas fasciata monilis	Band-tailed Pigeon	320	OPJ84646	320	36.7%	59.9%	Aves
Saccaglossus kowalevskii	Acorn Worm	627	XP_006821285	627	31.8%	51%	Enteropneusta

== Predicted Post-Translational Modification ==
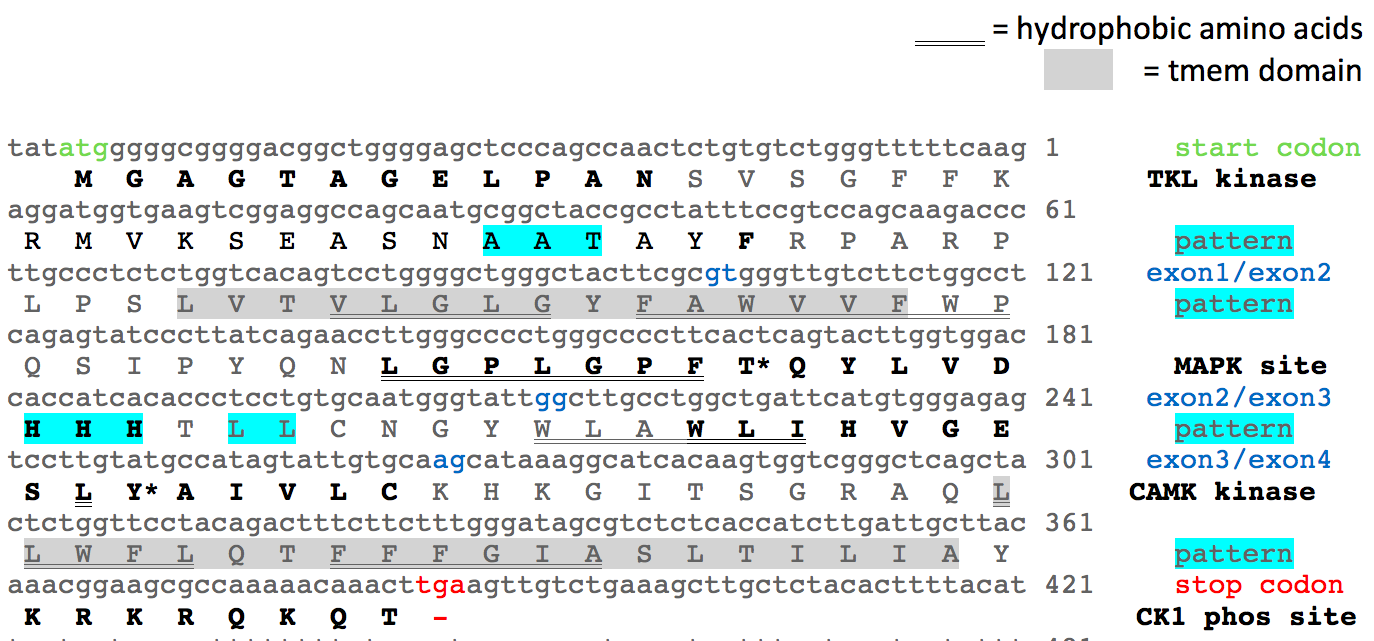
Conceptual Translation

Using various tools at ExPASy the following are possible post-translational modifications for TMEM254.

- 4 possible PKC phosphorylation sites
- 3 possible PKA phosphorylation sites
