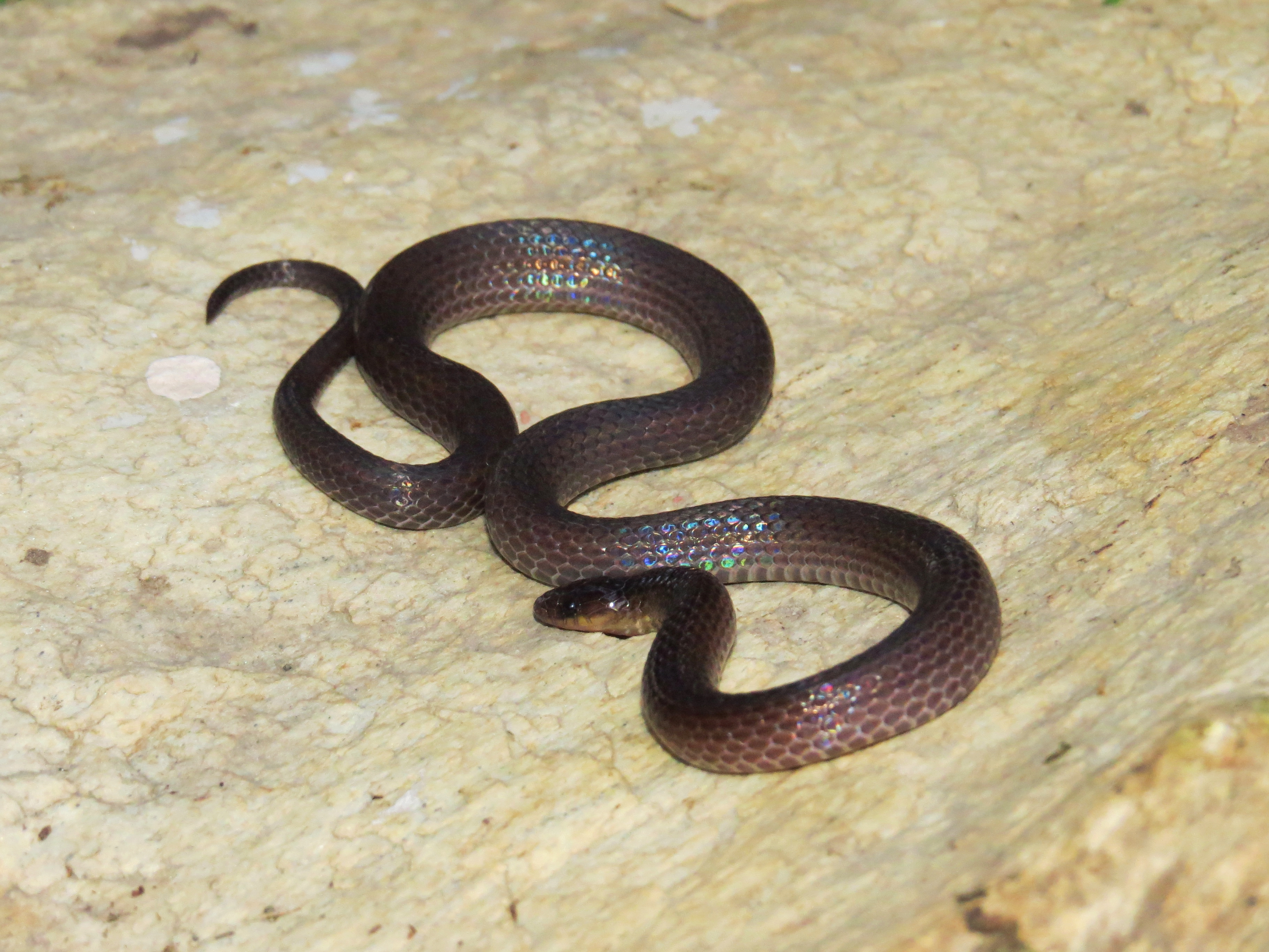
- Trachischium tenuiceps (yellowbelly worm-eating snake)

Scientific classification
- Kingdom: Animalia
- Phylum: Chordata
- Class: Reptilia
- Order: Squamata
- Suborder: Serpentes
- Family: Colubridae
- Subfamily: Natricinae
- Genus: Trachischium; Günther, 1858

= Trachischium =

Genus of snakes

Trachischium is a genus of snakes, known commonly as slender snakes or worm-eating snakes, in the subfamily Natricinae of the family Colubridae. The genus is endemic to Asia.

== Geographic range ==
Species of the genus Trachischium are found through montane regions of the countries of Bangladesh, Bhutan, China, India, and Nepal.

== Description ==
Snakes of the genus Trachischium exhibit the following characters: head not distinct from neck; eye small, with vertically subelliptic pupil; nostril between two small nasals; prefrontals sometimes united; body cylindrical; dorsal scales smooth, in 13 or 15 rows, without apical pits; ventrals rounded; tail short; subcaudals divided; maxillary teeth 18–20, subequal; posterior mandibular teeth shorter than anterior; hypapophyses developed throughout vertebral column.

== Species ==
There are 7 species in the genus Trachischium which are recognized as being valid.

- Trachischium apteii Bhosale, Gowande, & Mirza, 2019
- Trachischium fuscum (Blyth, 1854) – blackbelly worm-eating snake, Darjeeling slender snake
- Trachischium guentheri Boulenger, 1890 – Günther's worm-eating snake, rosebelly worm-eating snake
- Trachischium laeve Peracca, 1904 – olive Oriental slender snake
- Trachischium lalremsangai Bhardwaj VK, Bal AK, Tluanga CL, Mirza ZA, 2026
- Trachischium monticola (Cantor, 1839) – mountain worm-eating snake
- Trachischium sushantai Raha, S. Das, Bag, Debnath & Pramanick, 2018 – Sushanta's worm-eating snake
- Trachischium tenuiceps (Blyth, 1854) – yellowbelly worm-eating snake

Nota bene: A binomial authority in parentheses indicates that the species was originally described in a genus other than Trachischium.
