= Spotted house gecko =

Spotted house gecko may refer to:

- Gekko monarchus
- Hemidactylus brookii
- Hemidactylus parvimaculatus
