= Trachischium apteii =

Scientific classification
- Kingdom: Animalia
- Phylum: Chordata
- Class: Reptilia
- Order: Squamata
- Suborder: Serpentes
- Family: Colubridae
- Genus: Trachischium
- Species: T. apteii

Binomial name
- Trachischium apteii Bhosale, Gowande, & Mirza, 2019

Species of snake

Trachischium apteii is a species of colubrid snake, which is endemic to India.
