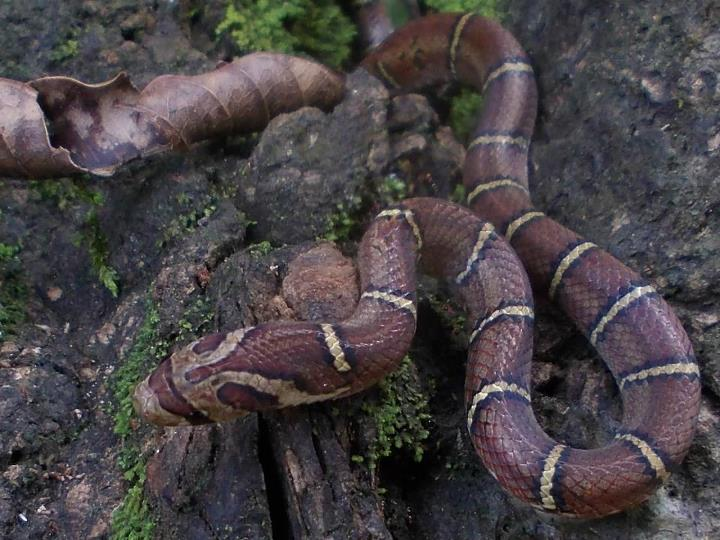

Conservation status
- Least Concern (IUCN 3.1)

Scientific classification
- Kingdom: Animalia
- Phylum: Chordata
- Class: Reptilia
- Order: Squamata
- Suborder: Serpentes
- Family: Colubridae
- Genus: Oligodon
- Species: O. albocinctus

Binomial name
- Oligodon albocinctus (Cantor, 1839)

Synonyms
- Coronella albocincta Cantor, 1839

= Oligodon albocinctus =

Species of snake

Oligodon albocinctus, also known as the light-barred kukri snake, is a species of colubrid snake. It is endemic to Asia. The species was first described by Theodore Cantor in 1839.

== Geographic range ==
It is found in Nepal, Bhutan, Bangladesh, Northeast India, Myanmar, Vietnam, and China (Tibet, Yunnan).
