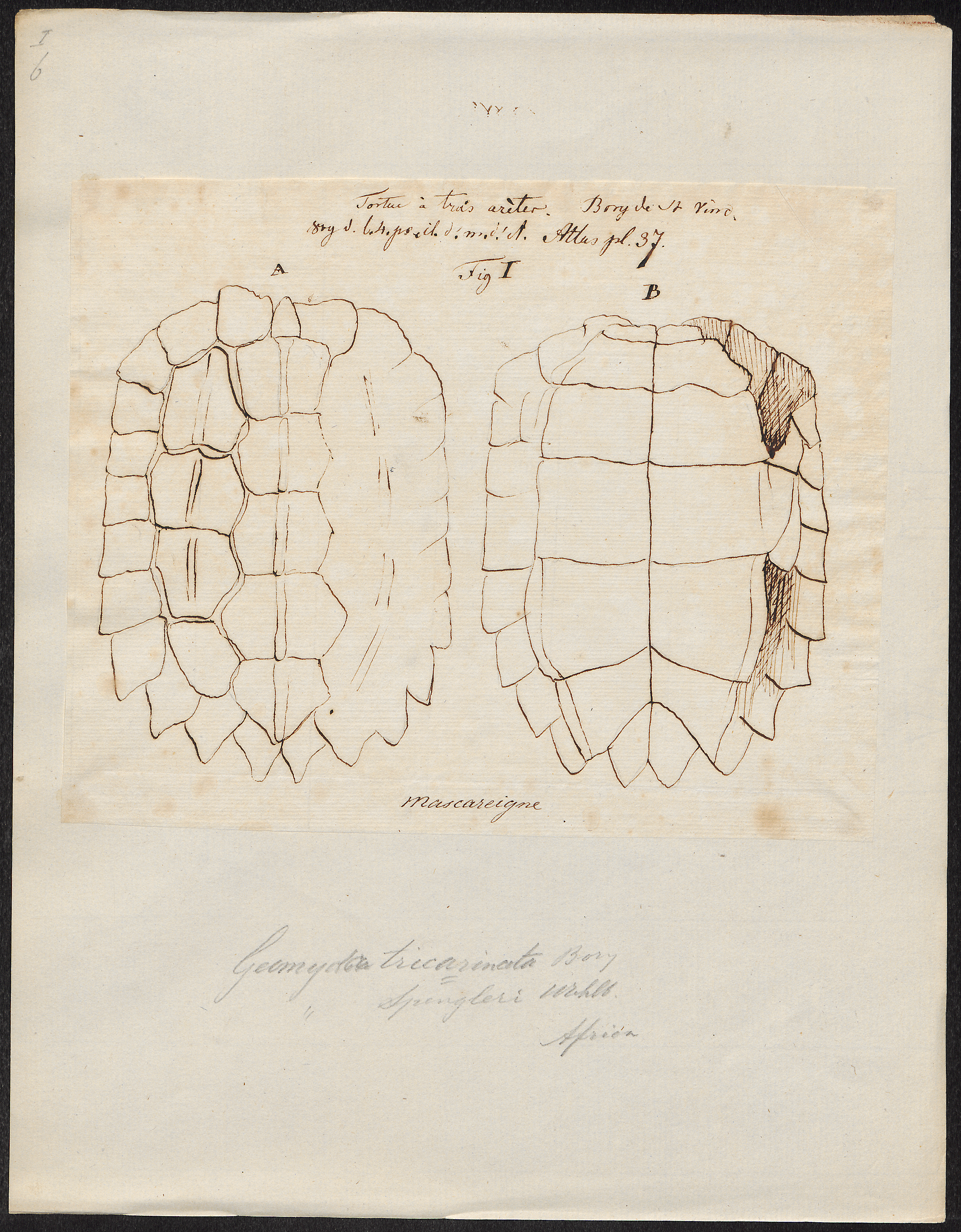

Conservation status
- Endangered (IUCN 3.1)
- CITES Appendix I

Scientific classification
- Kingdom: Animalia
- Phylum: Chordata
- Class: Reptilia
- Order: Testudines
- Suborder: Cryptodira
- Family: Geoemydidae
- Genus: Melanochelys
- Species: M. tricarinata

Binomial name
- Melanochelys tricarinata (Blyth, 1856)

Synonyms
- Geomyda tricarinata Blyth, 1856; Geoemyda tricarinata Gray, 1870; Chaibassia tricarinata Theobald, 1876; Chaibassia theobaldi Anderson, 1879; Nicoria tricarinata Lydekker, 1889; Nicoria tricarinata var. sivalensis Lydekker, 1889; Melanochelys tricarinata McDowell, 1964; Nicoria sivalensis Młynarski, 1976; Melanochelys tricarinate Das, 1991 (ex errore)

= Tricarinate hill turtle =

Species of turtle

The tricarinate hill turtle or three-keeled land turtle (Melanochelys tricarinata) is a species of turtle found in northeastern India, Bangladesh, and Nepal.

== Systematics ==
The species was first described by Edward Blyth in 1856, then under the name Geomyda tricarinata – subsequently emended to Geoemyda by John Edward Gray in 1870. The type locality is Chaibasa, Jharkhand, (Note: Reptile Database states "Chaibassa, Bihar state, India"; however, contrary to this claim, Chaibasa is actually located in Jharkhand, which was created out of the southern part of Bihar in 2000.) and the holotype is held by the Zoological Survey of India (idenfier ZSI 816). The specific name tricarinata is derived from the Latin tri 'three' and carinata 'keeled', referring to the three ridges on the turtle's carapace.

The species was given its own genus, Chaibassa, in 1879 by John Anderson. Chaibassa was subsequently synonymized with Melanochelys, which contains one other species: Melanochelys trijuga. A 2025 study concluded that its phylogenic assessment of Melanochelys tricarinata showed the species diverged from its closest relatives during the Oligocene, and evaluated the species genome as having a low haplotypic diversity.

== Description ==
The Tricarinate hill turtle has an elongated carapace, up to 16.3 cm (6.4 in) long, with a high dome that features the three low keels that gives the turtle its name. The carapace is primarily reddish brown to black, but the keels are yellow to brown instead. The turtle's plastron is long and notched in the back, and shares a yellowish to orange colour with the bridge. (Note: The part of the turtle shell that connects the plastron with the carapace.)

The tail and head are similarly reddish brown to black. The head has a pair narrow stripe, usually red but occasionally yellow or orange, one extending from the nostrils over the head and onto the neck and the other backwards from the corner of the mouth. The limbs are also reddish brown to black, in some individuals with some yellow spotting. The hind feet are "clublike", and have toes with little to no webbing. The forelimbs have large "square or pointed scales" facing forwards, and toes that are half-webbed. The claws are long, with the exception of the outermost claw of each set, which is instead very small.

== Distribution and habitat ==
The Tricarinate hill turtle is found in northern India and southern Nepal, and possibly also in Bangladesh. It primarily inhabits the grasslands along the Himalayan sections of the rivers Ganges and Brahmaputra and the moist forests of the nearby foothills, up to an elevation of 300 m (980 ft).

The species faces multiple threats: habitat loss, hunting for food, use for materials in the manufacture of curio masks and collection for sale in the exotic pet trade were mentioned as factors by the 2018 IUCN Red List assessment that listed the Tricarinate hill turtle as an endangered species.
