= Trachischium sushantai =

Conservation status
- Data Deficient (IUCN 3.1)

Scientific classification
- Kingdom: Animalia
- Phylum: Chordata
- Class: Reptilia
- Order: Squamata
- Suborder: Serpentes
- Family: Colubridae
- Genus: Trachischium
- Species: T. sushantai

Binomial name
- Trachischium sushantai Raha, S. Das, Bag, Debnath, & Pramanick, 2018

Species of snake

Trachischium sushantai, Sushanta's worm-eating snake, is a species of colubrid snake, which is endemic to India.
