= Trachischium monticola =

Conservation status
- Least Concern (IUCN 3.1)

Scientific classification
- Kingdom: Animalia
- Phylum: Chordata
- Class: Reptilia
- Order: Squamata
- Suborder: Serpentes
- Family: Colubridae
- Genus: Trachischium
- Species: T. monticola

Binomial name
- Trachischium monticola (Cantor, 1839)

Synonyms
- Calamaria monticola Cantor, 1839; Cyclophis monticola - Günther, 1864; Ablabes albiventer Günther, 1875; Trachischium monticola - Boulenger, 1890

Species of snake

The mountain worm-eating snake (Trachischium monticola) is a species of colubrid snake.

== Geographic range ==
It is found in India (Assam, Meghalaya; Arunachal Pradesh [Chessa - Papum Pare district]), Bangladesh, Nepal and China (Tibet).

== Description ==
It is dark brown dorsally, with two pale brown stripes edged with black lines. Ventrally it is yellowish. Juveniles have an interrupted yellow collar. The smooth dorsal scales are arranged in 15 rows. Adults may attain 23 cm (9.1 in) in total length, with a tail 3 cm (1.2 in) long.
