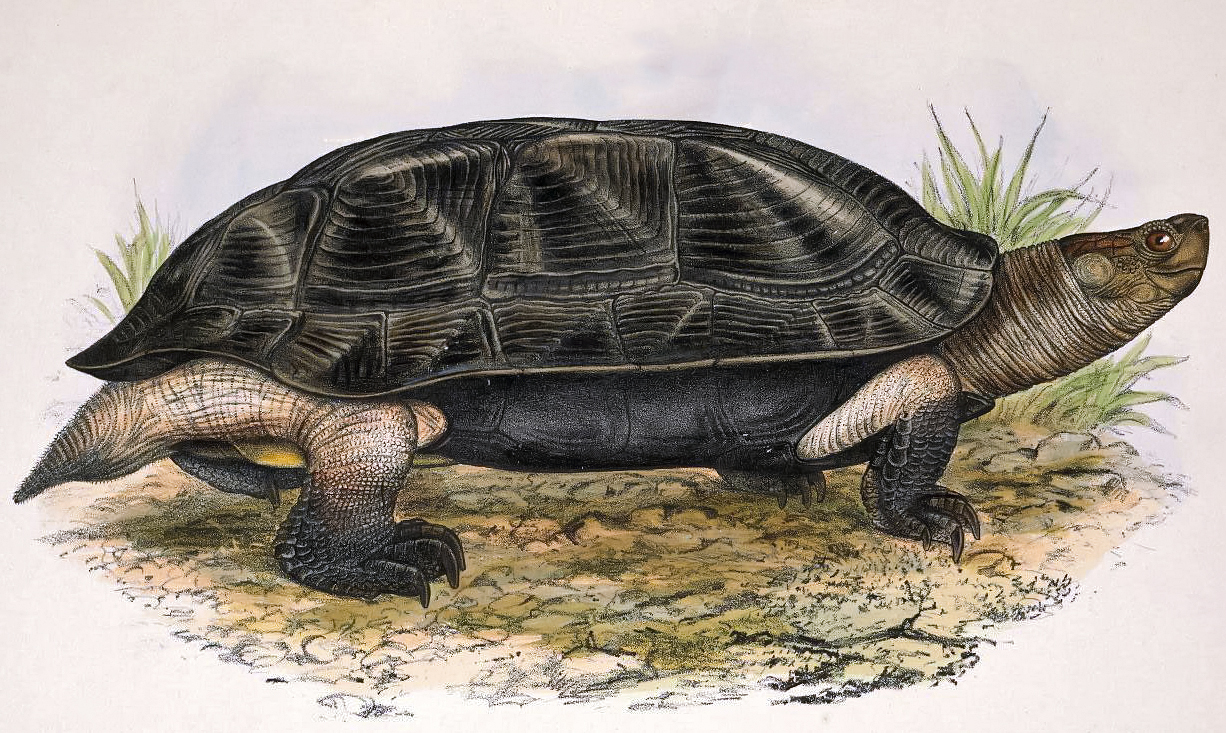
- Melanochelys trijuga

Scientific classification
- Domain: Eukaryota
- Kingdom: Animalia
- Phylum: Chordata
- Class: Reptilia
- Order: Testudines
- Suborder: Cryptodira
- Superfamily: Testudinoidea
- Family: Geoemydidae
- Subfamily: Geoemydinae
- Genus: Melanochelys; Gray, 1834

= Melanochelys =

Genus of turtles

Melanochelys is a genus of turtles in the family Geoemydidae. Members are found in India, Myanmar, Bangladesh, Sri Lanka and Nepal.

== Species ==
Melanochelys contains only two species:

- Indian black turtle (Melanochelys trijuga)
- Tricarinate hill turtle (Melanochelys tricarinata)
