= Trachischium fuscum =

Conservation status
- Least Concern (IUCN 3.1)

Scientific classification
- Kingdom: Animalia
- Phylum: Chordata
- Class: Reptilia
- Order: Squamata
- Suborder: Serpentes
- Family: Colubridae
- Genus: Trachischium
- Species: T. fuscum

Binomial name
- Trachischium fuscum (Blyth, 1854)

Synonyms
- Calamaria fusca Blyth, 1854; Calamaria obscura-striata Blyth, 1854; Trachischium rugosum Günther, 1858; Trachischium fuscum – Günther, 1860; Ablabes gilgiticus Annandale, 1905; Eminophis lineolata Werner, 1924; Trachischium fuscum – M.A. Smith, 1943

Species of snake

Trachischium fuscum, also known as the blackbelly worm-eating snake or the Darjeeling slender snake, is a species of colubrid snake, which is endemic to Asia. The specific name, fuscum, is Latin for "dusky" or "dark brown".

== Geographic range ==
It is found in Nepal and India (Jammu & Kashmir, northern West Bengal, Uttarakhand, Sikkim, Assam, eastern Arunachal Pradesh), possibly also in Bhutan.

== Description ==
As the common name implies, the venter is black or dark brown. The dorsum is also black or dark brown, and may have lighter longitudinal streaks. The dorsal scales are in 13 rows. Males have keeled scales on their sides in the anal region. Adults may attain 51 cm (20 inches) in total length, with a tail 6 cm (2¼ inches) long.
