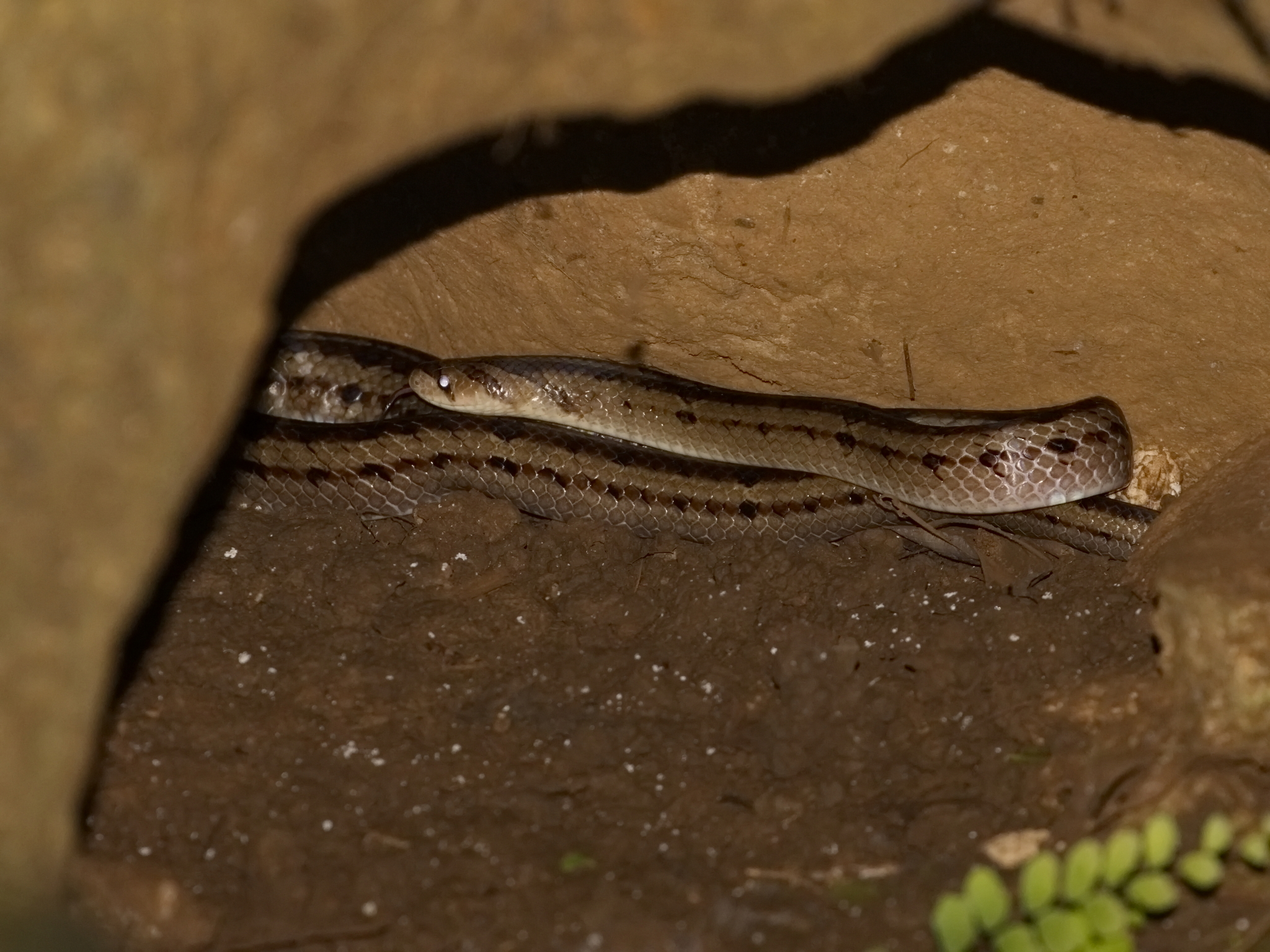
- Oligodon cyclurus in Thailand

Conservation status
- Least Concern (IUCN 3.1)

Scientific classification
- Kingdom: Animalia
- Phylum: Chordata
- Class: Reptilia
- Order: Squamata
- Suborder: Serpentes
- Family: Colubridae
- Genus: Oligodon
- Species: O. cyclurus

Binomial name
- Oligodon cyclurus (Cantor, 1839)

Synonyms
- Coronella cyclura CANTOR 1839; Coronella violacea CANTOR 1839; Simotes bicatenatus GÜNTHER 1864; Simotes cochinchinensis GÜNTHER 1864; Simotes brevicauda STEINDACHNER 1867; Simotes bicatenatus — ANDERSON 1871; Simotes bicatenatus — STOLICZKA 1873; Simotes cyclurus — BOULENGER 1890; Simotes cyclurus — WALL 1908; Simotes albocinctus dorsolateralis WALL 1909 (fide WAGNER, pers. comm.); Simotes albocinctus var. dorsolateralis — WALL 1910; Holarchus cyclurus — SMITH 1920; Oligodon purpurascens WALL 1923 (non SCHLEGEL); Simotes smithi WERNER 1925 (fide SMITH 1928); Holarchus purpurascens — COCHRAN 1930; Oligodon cyclurus — SMITH 1943: 202; Oligodon dorsolateralis — TAYLOR 1965; Rhynchocalamus violaceus; Olygodon [sic] cyclurus — SCHULZ 1988; Oligodon dorsolateralis — DAS 1996: 58; Oligodon dorsolateralis — CHAN-ARD et al. 1999: 34; Oligodon dorsolateralis — PAUWELS et al. 2002; Oligodon cyclurus — GREEN et al. 2010; Oligodon cyclurus — DAVID et al. 2011; Oligodon cyclurus — WALLACH et al. 2014

= Oligodon cyclurus =

Cantor's Kukri Snake

Species of snake

Oligodon cyclurus (Cantor's kukri snake) is a species of snake found in Asia. It was first described by Theodore Cantor in 1839.

== Distribution ==
India (Assam), Bangladesh, Nepal, Myanmar (Burma), Thailand, Laos, Cambodia, Vietnam, China (Yunnan).

Oligodon cyclurus dorsolateralis: Thailand, Myanmar (Burma), India (Assam).
