= Trachischium guentheri =

Conservation status
- Vulnerable (IUCN 3.1)

Scientific classification
- Kingdom: Animalia
- Phylum: Chordata
- Class: Reptilia
- Order: Squamata
- Suborder: Serpentes
- Family: Colubridae
- Genus: Trachischium
- Species: T. guentheri

Binomial name
- Trachischium guentheri Boulenger, 1890

Species of snake

Trachischium guentheri, commonly known as the rosebelly worm-eating snake or Günther's worm-eating snake, is a species of colubrid snake, which is endemic to Asia.

== Etymology ==
The epithet, guentheri, honors Albert Günther (1830–1914), German-born zoologist at the British Museum (Natural History).

== Geographic range ==
T. guentheri is found in India (Sikkim, West Bengal), Bangladesh, Nepal, and Bhutan.

== Habitat ==
The preferred natural habitat of T. guentheri is forest with rocky slopes, at altitudes of about 1,800 m (5,900 ft).

== Description ==
The rosebelly worm-eating snake does have a rose-colored belly when alive. However, specimens preserved in alcohol are dark brown dorsally, with indistinct lighter and darker longitudinal streaks; and are yellowish ventrally, either uniform or scantily mottled with brown.

The dorsal scales are arranged in 13 rows and are smooth, except that the males have keeled dorsal scales in the anal/basicaudal region. The ventrals are 134–138; the anal plate is divided; and the subcaudals, which are also divided, number 34–39.

Adults may attain 28 cm (11 in) in total length, with a tail 3.5 cm (1.4 in) long.

== Behavior ==
T. guentheri is terrestrial and semi-fossorial.

== Reproduction ==
T. guentheri is oviparous. An adult female may lay a clutch of up to four eggs in a communal oviposition site, which may contain as many as 130 eggs.
