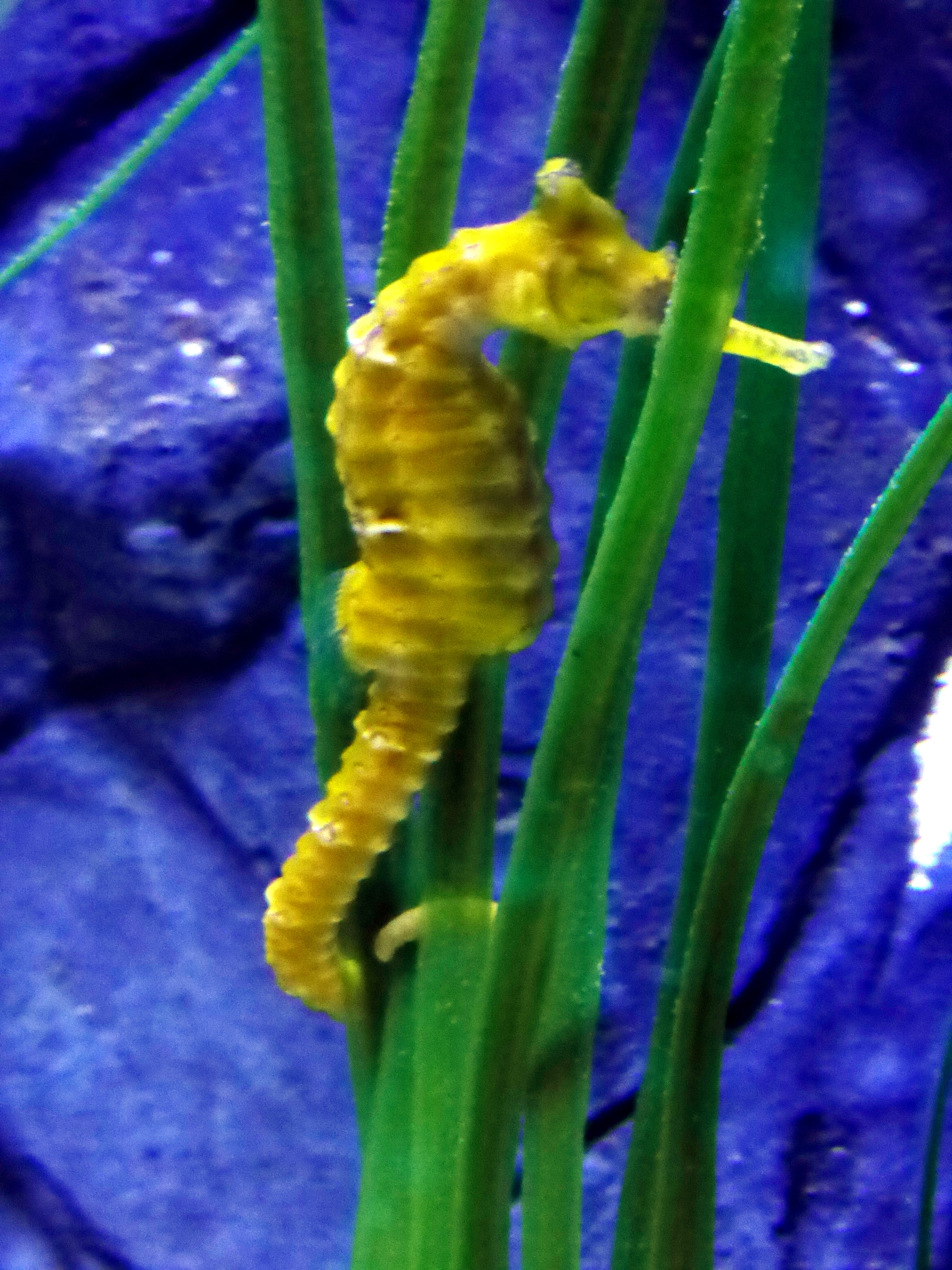

Conservation status
- Endangered (IUCN 3.1)
- CITES Appendix II

Scientific classification
- Kingdom: Animalia
- Phylum: Chordata
- Class: Actinopterygii
- Order: Syngnathiformes
- Family: Syngnathidae
- Genus: Hippocampus
- Species: H. comes

Binomial name
- Hippocampus comes Cantor, 1850

= Tiger tail seahorse =

Species of fish

The tiger tail seahorse (Hippocampus comes) is a species of fish in the family Syngnathidae. The species was first described by Theodore Cantor in 1850. It is found in India, Indonesia, Malaysia, the Philippines, Singapore, Thailand and Vietnam. Its natural habitats are subtidal aquatic beds and coral reefs. It is threatened by habitat loss.

The tiger tail sea horse lives in Western Central Pacific: Malaysia, Singapore, Thailand, Vietnam, and the Philippines. It lives from 0-1.5 years in captivity and in the wild, 1–5 years. It is harmless. Its climate in water is tropical; 15°N – 1°N and Its maximum size is 18.7 cm. Its snout is 2.2 in head length; it is used to suck up food. They eat small fish, coral, small shrimp, and plankton. The most common pattern is alternating yellow and black. The tail has stripes from the belly to the tip of the tail. These sea horses are normally found in pairs on coral reefs, sponge gardens, kelp, or floating Sargassum. This species is nocturnal. The male carries the eggs in a brood pouch on their chest which holds from 1 – 2,000 eggs and the pregnancy takes from 1 to 4 weeks. It is also used for traditional Chinese medicine. Seahorse populations are thought to have been endangered in recent years by over fishing and habitat destruction. The seahorse is used in traditional Chinese medicine, and as many as 20 million seahorses may be caught each year and sold for this purpose. Import and export of seahorses has been controlled under CITES since May 15, 2004. They don't have scales as fish do, they have a tough thin skin stretched out around bony rings on their bodies. This makes them an unlikely prey for most marine animals, as they are too bony to digest. They swim upright, rather than horizontally.

== Description ==
A medium-sized seahorse, the tiger tail seahorse reaches a maximum total length of around 15 centimetres (5.9 in). The coloration of this species is variable, generally being black or brown in adults with yellow saddle shapes on the upper surface and yellow stripes on the tail, hence the common name. Thin white stripes may be present in a radiating pattern around the eyes, as well as mottled patterns across the body. Like other seahorses, the tiger tail seahorse has bony plates arranged in rings throughout its body, with this species in particular having 11 trunk rings and 33 to 37 tail rings. The dorsal fin has 17 to 19 rays, while the pectoral fin has 16 to 19 rays. Two spines extend from each cheek, in addition to a prominent spine on the nose. The coronet (the crown-like spine on the head) is low and has five knobs.
