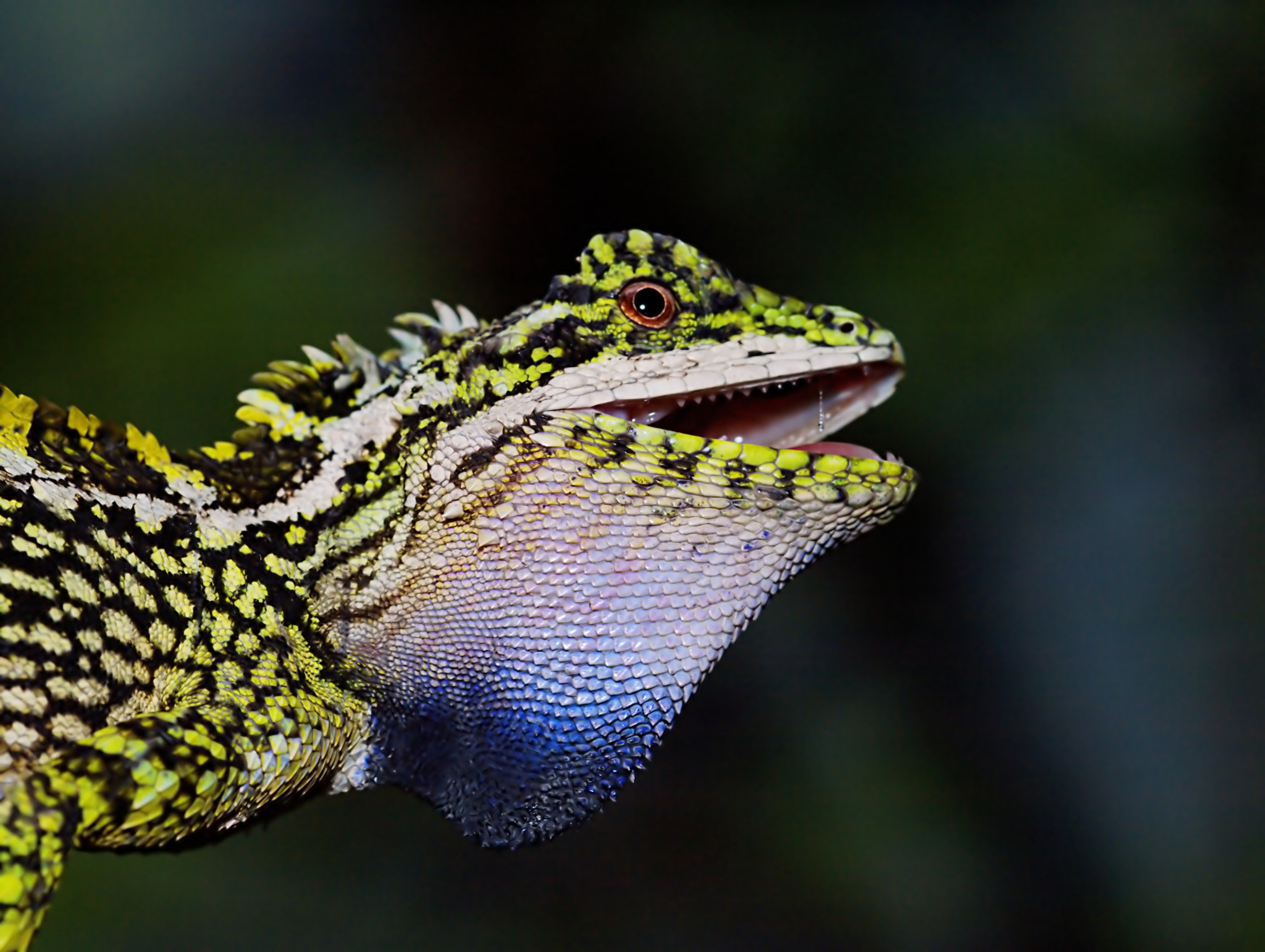

Conservation status
- Least Concern (IUCN 3.1)

Scientific classification
- Kingdom: Animalia
- Phylum: Chordata
- Class: Reptilia
- Order: Squamata
- Suborder: Iguania
- Family: Agamidae
- Genus: Japalura
- Species: J. variegata

Binomial name
- Japalura variegata Gray, 1853
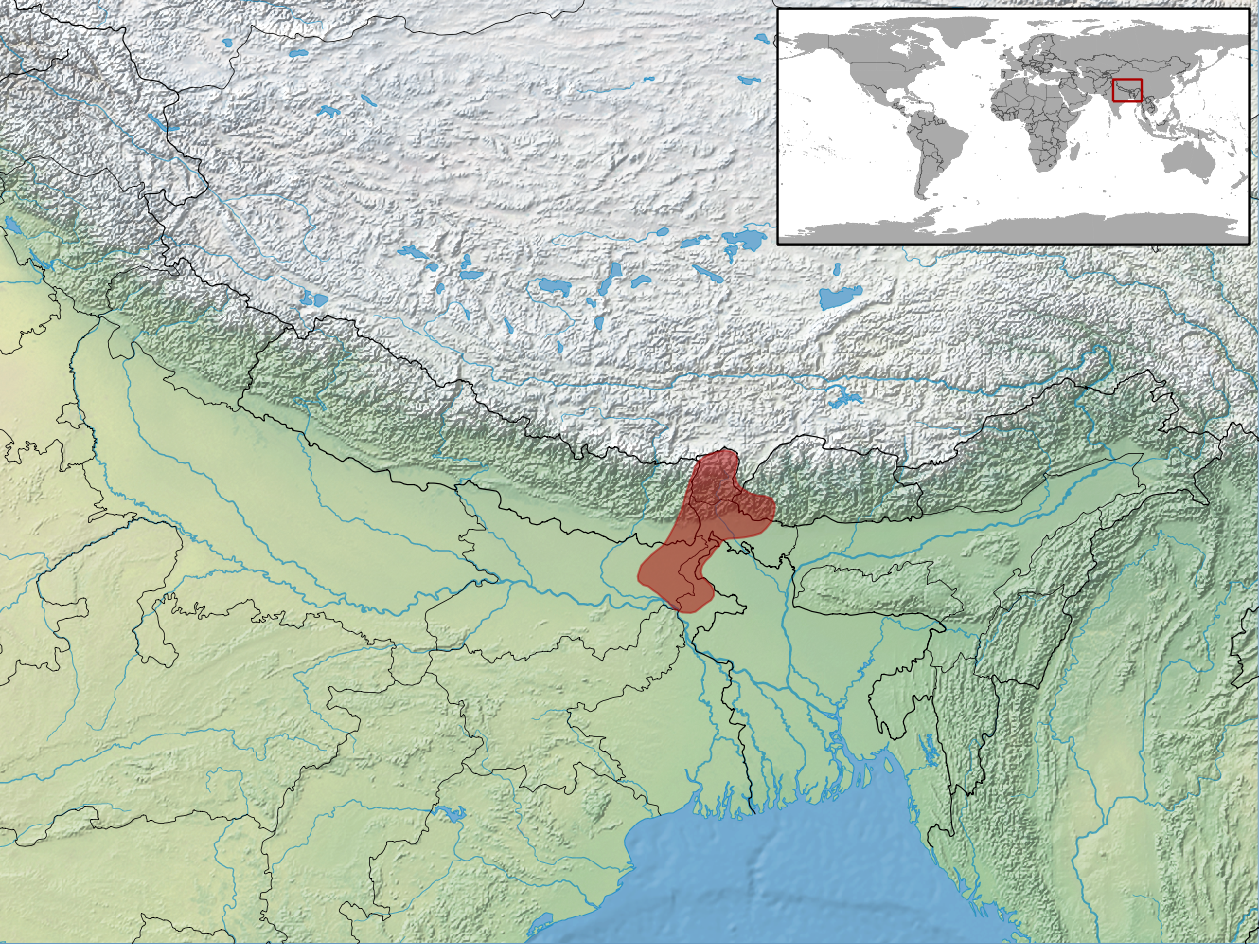

Synonyms
- Biancia niger Gray, 1853; Japalura microlepis Jerdon, 1870

= Variegated mountain lizard =

Species of lizard

The variegated mountain lizard or Himalayan dragon (Japalura variegata) is an agamid lizard found in northern India, Bhutan, and Nepal.

== Description ==
From C. A. L. Gunther (1864) The Reptiles of British India:

Head covered with small, irregular, keeled shields above; canthusrostralis sharp; a small tubercle behind the superciliary edge; throat covered with small keeled scales; a series of small shields commences at the chin and runs backwards parallel to the lower labial shields. Tongue scarcely notched in front; two small canine teeth in each jaw; the upper with fifteen very small molars on each side, much smaller than those of the lower jaw, which arc sub-corneal and seventeen in number. A fold across the throat; male with a small gular pouch. Nape of the neck granular, with scattered larger tubercles. Both sexes with a nuchal crest, composed of triangular lobes; it is continued along the back as a slight serrated ridge, and gradually disappears on the anterior part of the tail. Trunk slightly compressed; the upper parts arc covered with smallish, keeled scales, intermixed with larger ones, all having their points obliquely directed upwards. Ventral scales strongly keeled, of moderate size; there arc about thirty-eight scales in a longitudinal series between fore and hind limb. All the scales of the tail are rhomboid and keeled, those on its lower side being the largest. The hind limb extends to the eye, if laid forwards; toes with keeled scales below; the fourth hind toe is one-fourth longer than the third. Back with alternate brown or black and grayish or yellowish-white cross bands which ascend obliquely backwards; head above variegated with black; a light, black-edged cross band on the inter-orbital space. A white or yellow band along the upper lip; another irregular band along each side of the neck, confluent with one of the light cross bands. Gular sac black behind; tail with broad brown or black rings.

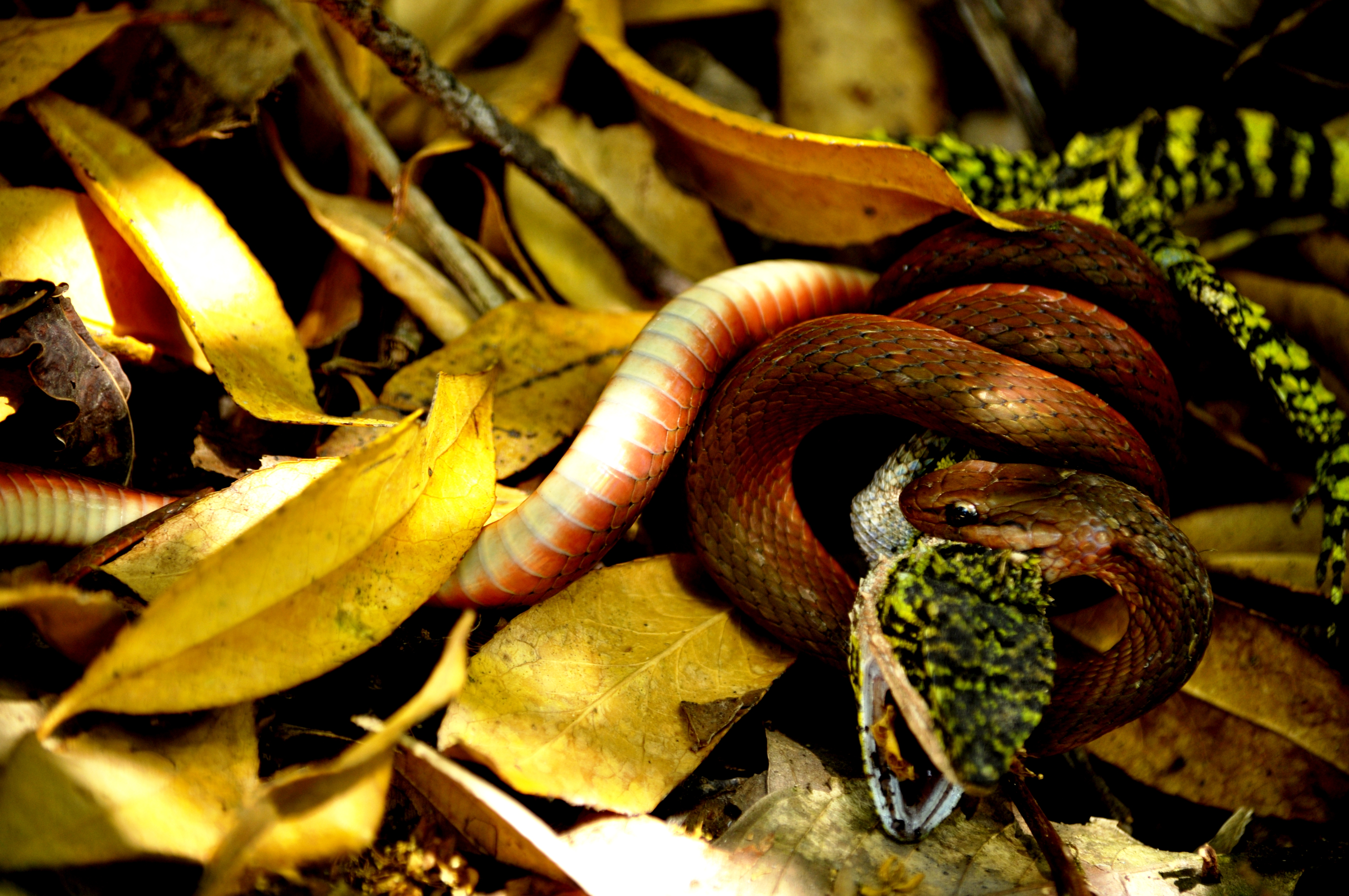
Preyed on by a colubrid snake.

The colours, however, vary to a considerable extent in this species. A large female is almost wholly black above, variegated with yellow, all the larger scales being of the latter color. The characteristic bands on the head and side of the neck arc present. This species is a native of Sikkim; it attains to a length of 12 inches, the tail taking two-thirds of it.
