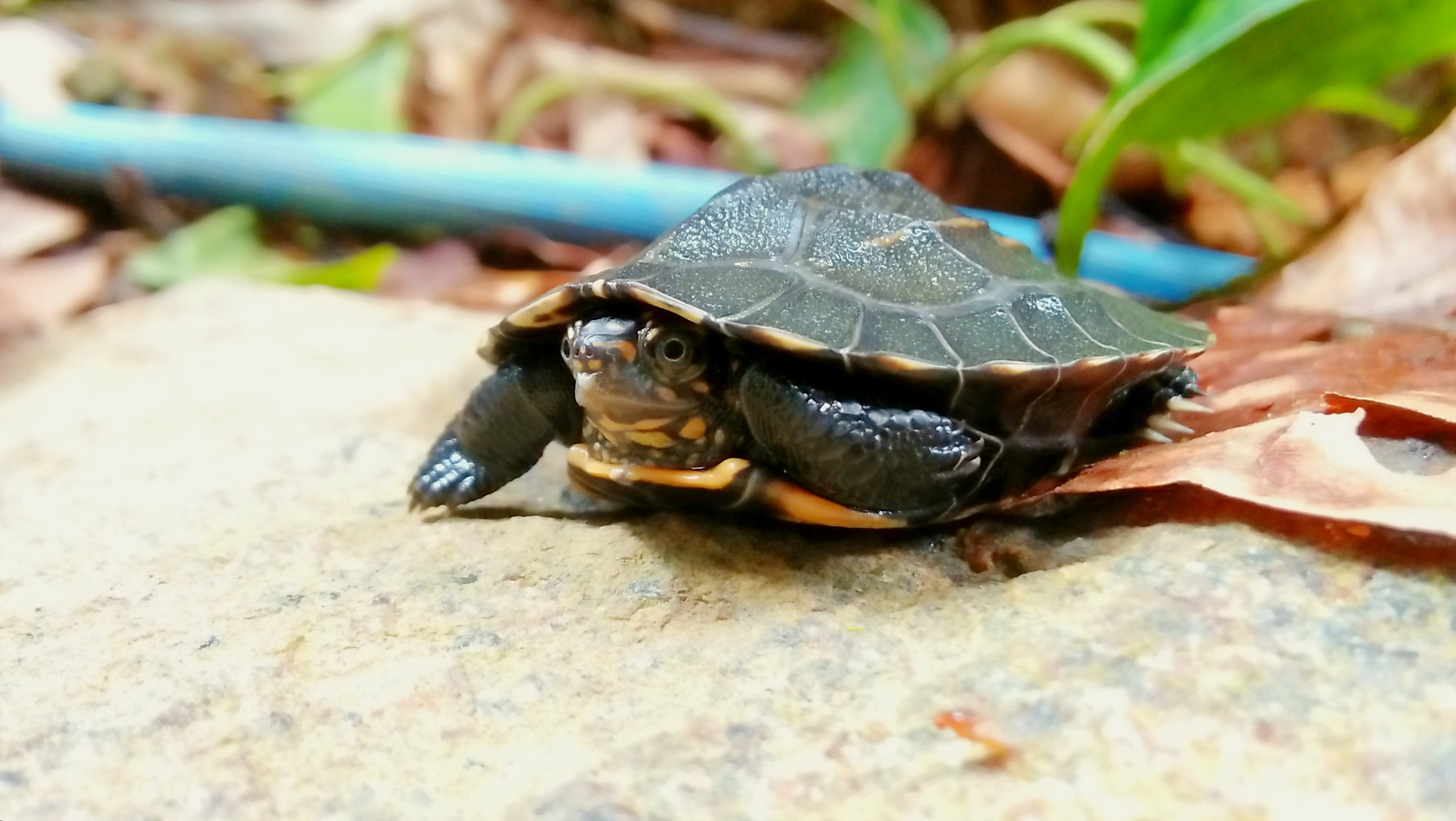
- Melanochelys trijuga

Conservation status
- Least Concern (IUCN 3.1)
- CITES Appendix II

Scientific classification
- Kingdom: Animalia
- Phylum: Chordata
- Class: Reptilia
- Order: Testudines
- Suborder: Cryptodira
- Family: Geoemydidae
- Genus: Melanochelys
- Species: M. trijuga

Binomial name
- Melanochelys trijuga (Schweigger, 1812)

Synonyms
- click to expand: Emys trijuga Schweigger, 1812; Emys belangeri Lesson, 1834; Clemmys (Clemmys) trijuga Fitzinger, 1835; Melanochelys trijuga Gray, 1869; Emys trijuga var. madraspatana Anderson, 1879; Clemmys theobaldi Lydekker, 1885; Bellia theobaldi Lydekker, 1889; Nicoria trijuga Boulenger, 1889; Geoemyda [trijuga] trijuga Siebenrock, 1909; Geoemyda trijuga plumbea Annandale, 1915; Melanochelys trijuga Deraniyagala, 1939; Melanochelys trijuga trijuga Pritchard, 1979; Melanochelys triguja Highfield, 1996 (ex errore); Emys trijuga var. coronata Anderson, 1879; Nicoria trijuga var. coronata Bruner, 1908; Geoemyda trijuga coronata Siebenrock, 1909; Melanochelys trijuga coronata Pritchard, 1979; Melanochelys edeniana Theobald, 1876; Emys trijuga var. burmana Anderson, 1879; Nicoria trijuga var. edeniana Boulenger, 1889; Geoemyda trijuga edeniana Siebenrock, 1909; Melanochelys trijuga edeniana Deraniyagala, 1939; Emys trijuga edeniana Bourret, 1941; Geoemyda trijuga wiroti Reimann, 1979; Melanochelys trijuga wiroti Stubbs, 1989; Melanochelys edeniana edeniana Bour, 2002; Melanochelys edeniana wiroti Bour, 2002; Geoemyda indopeninsularis Annandale, 1913; Geoemyda trijuga indopeninsularis Smith, 1931; Melanochelys trijuga indopeninsularis Deraniyagala, 1939; Melanochelys edeniana indopeninsularis Bour, 2002; Melanochelys trijuga parkeri Deraniyagala, 1939; Geoemyda trijuga parkeri Mertens & Wermuth, 1955; Emys thermalis Lesson, 1830; Emys sebae Gray, 1831; Emys seba Gray, 1844 (ex errore); Geoclemys seba Gray, 1856; Clemmys thermalis Strauch, 1862; Melanochelys sebae Gray, 1870; Emys trijuga var. sebae Anderson, 1879; Nicoria trijuga var. thermalis Boulenger, 1889; Geoemyda trijuga thermalis Siebenrock, 1909; Melanochelys trijuga thermalis Deraniyagala, 1939

= Indian black turtle =

Species of reptile found in South Asia

The Indian black turtle (Melanochelys trijuga) or Indian pond terrapin is a species of medium-sized freshwater turtle found in South Asia.

== Description ==
Their shell is a typically made up of shades of dark brown, green, or grey, not just black. Their heads feature even more variation in color, as different subspecies may have pink or yellow spots. Melanochelys trijuga coronata has a yellow spot on the head, while M. t. trijuga and M. t. indopeninsularis have different pink spots. The average shell is about 6 inches long, while the entire body is usually about one foot.

== Distribution and habitat ==
The species occurs in India, Bangladesh, Myanmar, Sri Lanka, the Maldives, Nepal, and the Chagos Archipelago, where it may have been introduced. There are five recognized subspecies with overlapping distributions:

- M. t. trijuga: peninsula black turtle, India
- M. t. coronata: Cochin black turtle, India
- M. t. indopeninsularis: Bangladesh black turtle, India, Nepal
- M. t. parkeri: Sri Lanka
- M. t. thermalis: Sri Lanka black turtle, India, Maldives, Sri Lanka

The Indian black turtle inhabits a variety of water bodies including ponds, marshes streams, rivers and artificial water bodies like rice-paddies, watering holes etc.

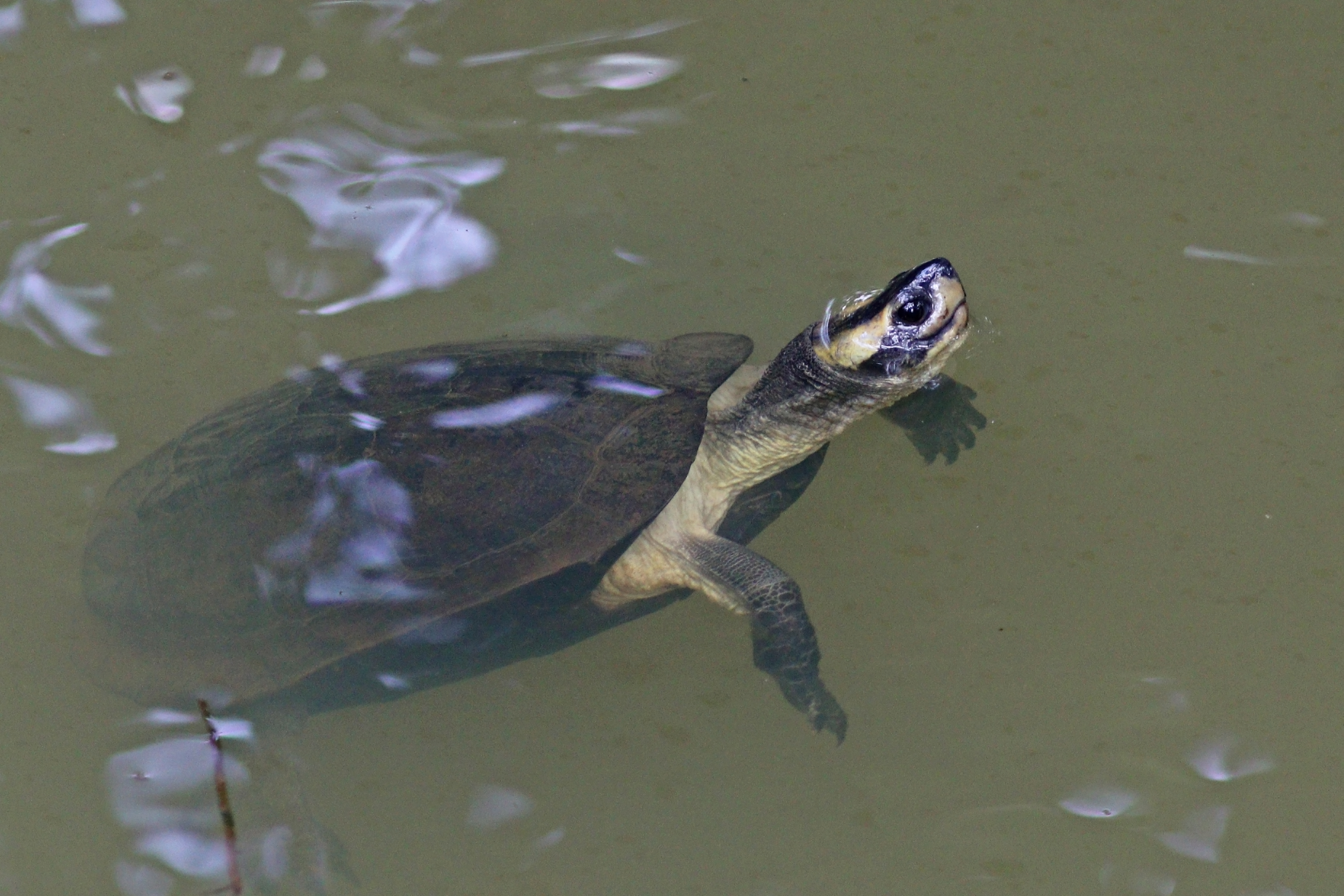
M. t. coronata
Chambal River, Uttar Pradesh, India

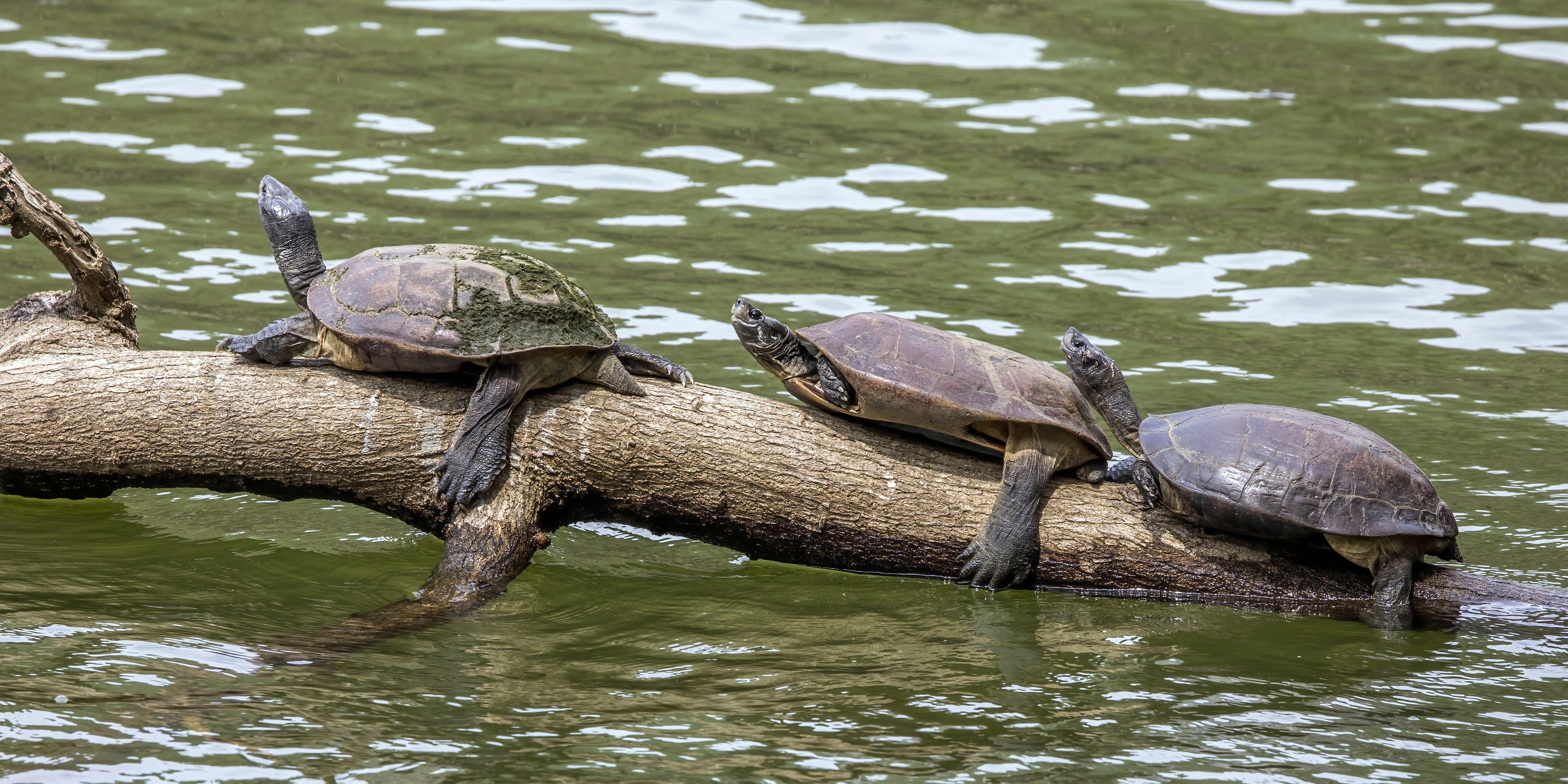
M. t. thermalis
Kandy, Sri Lanka

== Ecology ==
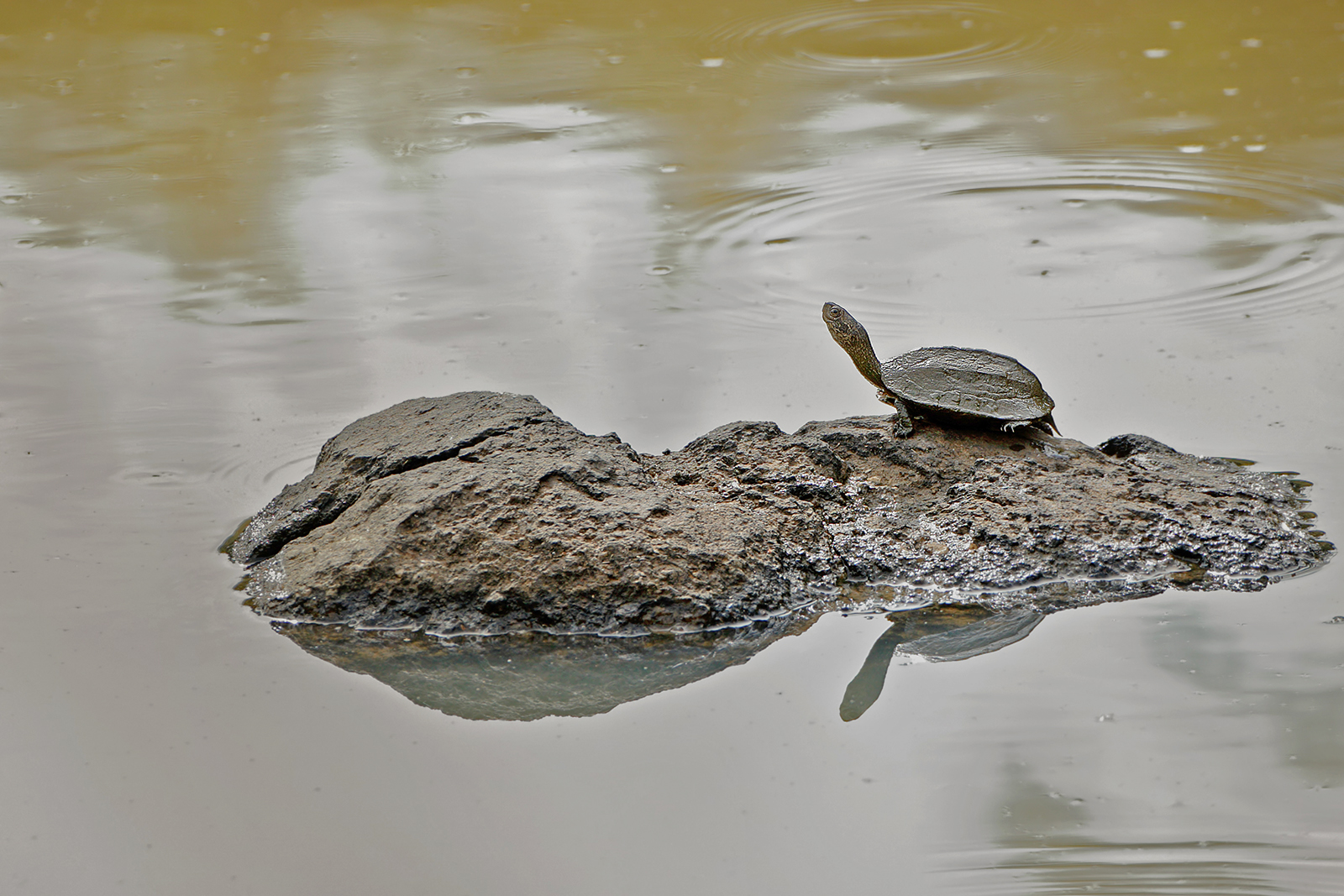
In Nagarhole National Park

The species is typically most energetic at the beginning or end of the day, spending most of the day basking in the sun. The Sri Lankan subspecies, on the other hand, tends to spend the day living in or below the ground. The species utilizes many different aquatic areas as habitats. They may live in areas that are completely aquatic, either in still or moving water. Others can still live in less aquatic areas. It is omnivorous, and feeds on many different plants near water, small animals, and animal waste. Indian black turtles may sometimes be seen to aggregate alongside the carcass of a large dead animal.

=== Breeding ===
The Indian black turtle reproduces during the long summer days of monsoon season in July and August. They prepare to mate in the spring and during the shorter, winter days their bodies struggle and lose the ability to reproduce. During this time the male becomes particularly aggressive and starts chasing the female, biting her on the neck. The male attaches itself to the top of the female during mating. Once mating is completed, the female digs a nest in the ground or occasionally in a pile of rhinoceros or elephant dung, using the left hind leg to excavate the nest and right hind leg to clear the excess material. Two to six individual clutches of eggs are laid in burrows per year.

== Conservation ==
The endangerment of the species varies throughout their region of inhabitance but is extremely high in parts, making them like most other soft-shelled turtles. A majority of turtles within the region are at least considered endangered. They are hunted in order to be eaten and traded, but despite government urgency, little action is taken. They fall at risk because they take many years to reach adulthood, and once they do, they do not reproduce at a high rate. There are many separate generational turtle catching business, even though most know it is illegal and have been caught but are not subject to a high-level punishment.
