= Theodore Cantor =

Danish zoologist (1809–1860)

Theodore Edward Cantor
- Born: 1809; Copenhagen
- Died: 1860 (age 51); India
- Occupations: physician zoologist botanist
- Employer: British East India Company

Theodore Edward Cantor (Danish: Theodor Edvard) (1809–1860) was a Danish physician, zoologist and botanist. He described several new species of reptiles and amphibians, and six species have been named in his honor.

Cantor was born to a Danish Jewish family; his mother was a sister of Nathaniel Wallich. Cantor worked for the British East India Company, and made natural history collections in Penang and Malacca.

== Career ==
Cantor was the first Western scientist to describe the Siamese fighting fish. In the scientific field of herpetology he described many new species of reptiles and amphibians. Species first described by Cantor include Bungarus bungaroides (1839), Bungarus lividus (1839), Channa argus (1842), Elaphe rufodorsata (1842), Euprepiophis mandarinus (1842), Hippocampus comes (1850), Lycodon effraenis (1847), Misgurnus anguillicaudatus (1842), Naja atra (1842), Oligodon albocinctus (1839), Oligodon cyclurus (1839), Ophiophagus hannah (1836), Oreocryptophis porphyracea (1839), Pareas monticola (1839), Protobothrops mucrosquamatus (1839), Ptyas dhumnades (1842), and Trimeresurus erythrurus (1839).

The snake genus Cantoria with the type species Cantoria violacea (Cantor's water snake) is named in Cantor's honour, as are Acanthodactylus cantoris (Indian fringe-fingered lizard), Elaphe cantoris (eastern trinket snake), Hydrophis cantoris (Cantor's small-headed sea snake), Pelochelys cantorii (Cantor's giant softshell turtle), and Trimeresurus cantori (Cantor's pit viper).

== Publications ==
- Notes respecting some Indian fishes (1839)
- — (1841). Conspectus of Collections Made by Dr. Cantor, Assistant Surgeon, During His Employment with H.M. 26th Regt. on Expedition to China, 1840.
- — (1842). "General Features of Chusan, with Remarks on the Fauna and Flora of That Island". The Annals and Magazine of Natural History. 9: 481. doi:10.1080/03745484209445368.
- — (1846). On a Species of Semnopithecus from the Peninsula of Malacca. R. and J.E. Taylor.
- — (1842). Zoology of Chusan.
- — (1846). Catalogue of Mammalia inhabiting the Malayan Peninsula and Islands, etc. (Extracted from the Journal of the Asiatic Society.). Bishop's College Press.
- — (1981). Catalogue of Reptiles: Inhabiting the Asian Continent. Cosmo Publications. ISBN 978-81-7020-107-6.
- — (1849). Catalogue of Malayan Fishes. Journal of the Asiatic Society of Bengal. Baptist Mission Press.

== Taxa described by him ==
- See Category:Taxa named by Theodore Edward Cantor

== Cantor Lectures ==
A bequest made by Cantor to the Society of Arts in London was applied to the founding of a lecture series on industrial applications of science. It began with talks in 1863, and became known as the Cantor Lectures.
