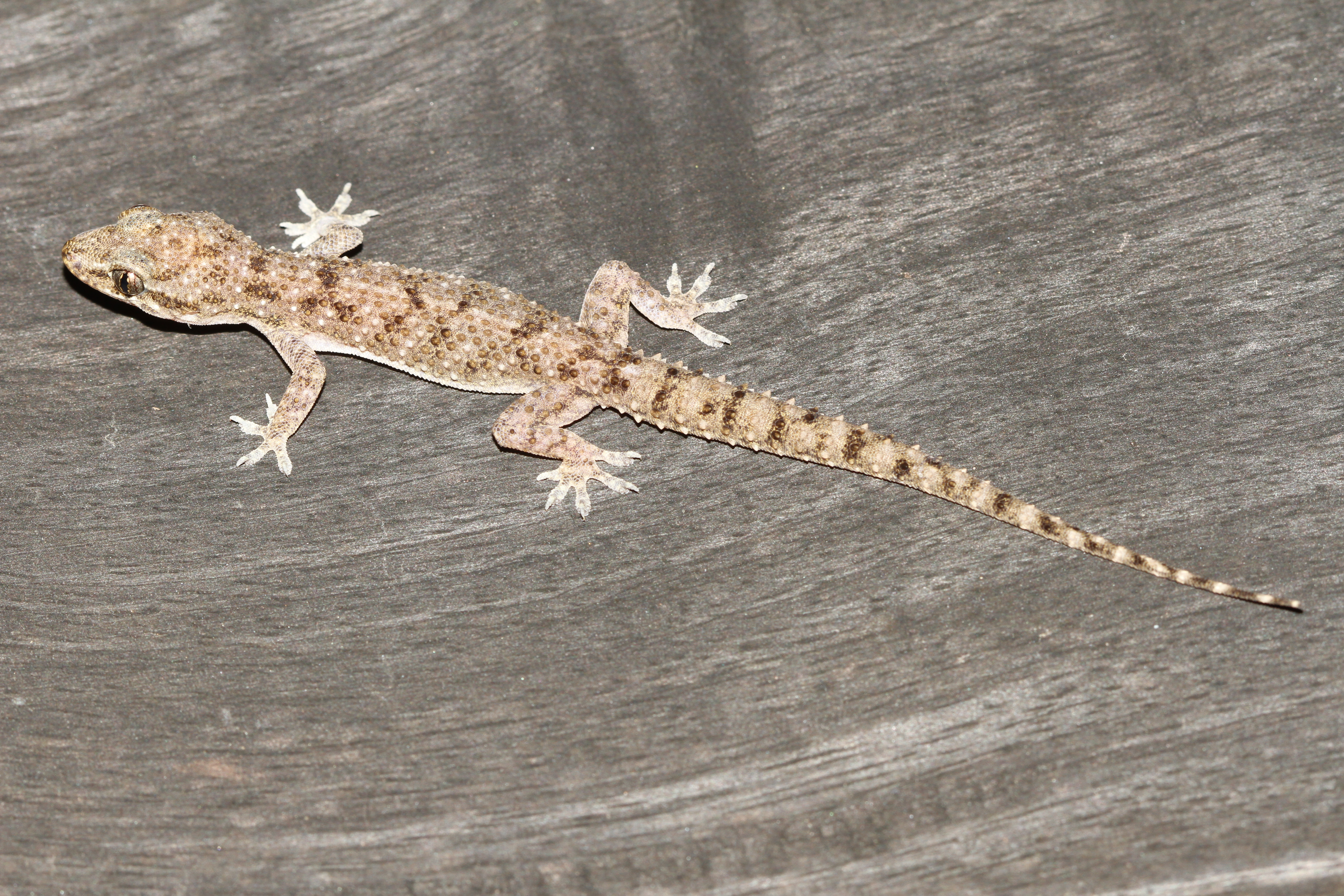

Conservation status
- Least Concern (IUCN 3.1)

Scientific classification
- Kingdom: Animalia
- Phylum: Chordata
- Class: Reptilia
- Order: Squamata
- Suborder: Gekkota
- Family: Gekkonidae
- Genus: Hemidactylus
- Species: H. brookii

Binomial name
- Hemidactylus brookii Gray, 1845

Synonyms
- Gecko tytleri; Hemidactylus guineensis; Hemidactylus affinis; Hemidactylus stellatus; Hemidactylus togoensis; Hemidactylus luzonensis; Hemidactylus neotropicalis; Hemidactylus trokii; Hemidactylus mahendrai; Hemidactylus brooki; Hemidactylus murrayi

= Hemidactylus brookii =

Species of lizard

Hemidactylus brookii, also known commonly as Brooke's house gecko and the spotted house gecko, is a widespread species of lizard in the family Gekkonidae.

== Etymology ==
The specific name, brookii, is in honor of British adventurer James Brooke.

== Description ==
Snout somewhat longer than the distance between the eye and the ear-opening, nearly twice the diameter of the orbit; forehead concave; ear-opening small, oval, vertical, about one third the diameter of the eye; on the occiput very small round tubercles. Rostral quadrangular, with a median cleft; nostril bordered by the rostral, the first upper labial and three nasals, the upper not in contact with its fellow. Eight to ten upper and seven to nine lower labials; mental large, triangular; two or three pair of chin-shields, median forming - a suture. Scales of the throat granular. Body covered with small granules, intermixed with large keeled trihedral tubercles, arranged in 16-20 longitudinal series, the keels of the outer ones indistinct; the diameter of the largest tubercles on the flanks exceeds the diameter of the ear-opening. Ventral scales larger than those on the throat, cycloid, imbricate. Male with 7-20 femoral pores on each side. Tail depressed, annulate, with rows of 8 or 6 spine-like tubercles, below with a series of transversely dilated plates. Limbs granular, the upper part of the hind limb with large keeled tubercles; digits free, dilated, the free distal joint long, 3-6 lamellae under the inner, 6-8 under the median toes.

Yellowish-brown above with irregular dark spots; one or two dark lines on the side of the head, passing through the eye; lips with dark bars. Lower parts white; all the scales finely dotted with dark brown. Young specimens have cross lines of white tubercles on the back; those on the tail all white.

Length of head and body 58 millimetres (2.3 in), tail 60 millimetres (2.4 in).

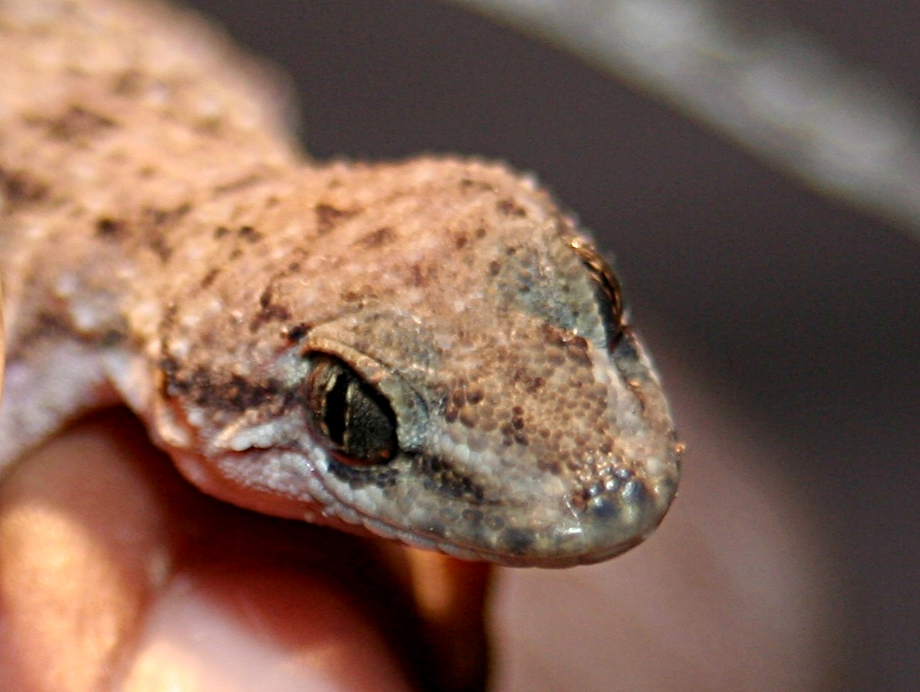
Brooke's house gecko in Madhya Pradesh, India

== Geographic range ==
By subspecies:

- brookii
  - Senegal, Togo, Angola, Cape Verde, Tanzania, [South Africa], Gambia, Democratic Republic of the Congo, Ghana, Eritrea, Ethiopia, Mali, Central African Republic, Ivory Coast, Cameroon, Sudan (Dagana + Goree Dondo/Cuanza River Atakpame).
  - India (Himalaya), Bhutan, Thailand (HR 33: 322), Maldives, Malaysian Peninsula, Sri Lanka, Myanmar (= Burma) (Tsagain), Pakistan, Bangladesh, Nepal, Indonesia (Borneo).
  - Mexico, Honduras, Haiti, Antilles, Cuba, Hispaniola, Puerto Rico, Port-Au-Prince, Trinidad, Colombia
- angulatus: Sudan, Uganda, south to Tanzania, west to Senegal. Zanzibar, Pemba Island.
  - Type locality: West coast of Africa = Gabon [angulatus]
- leightoni: Venezuela (Zulia), Colombia
  - Type locality: "Ada Foah (Guinea)" [= Ghana] [Hemidactylus guineensis PETERS 1868]
