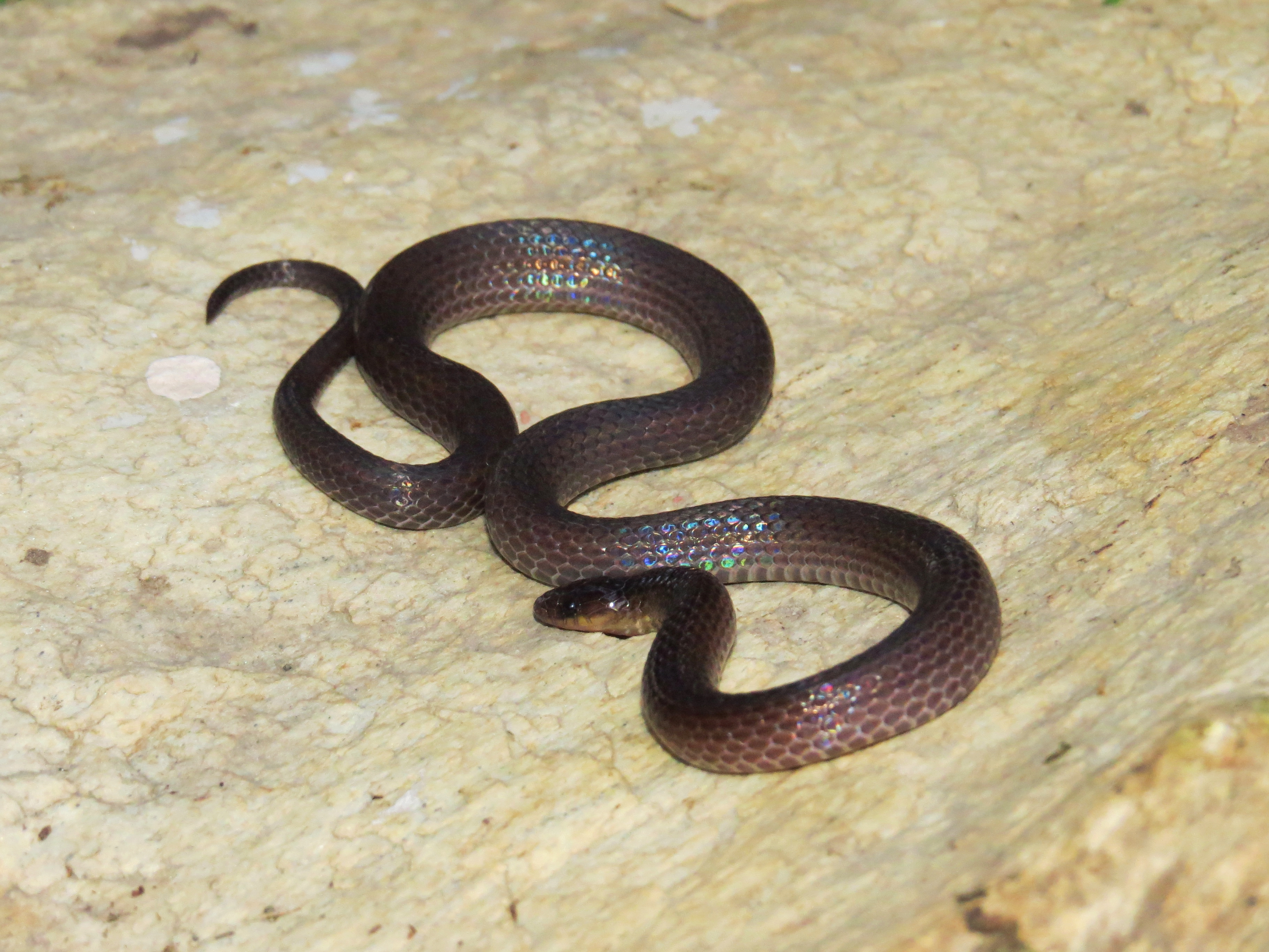

Conservation status
- Data Deficient (IUCN 3.1)

Scientific classification
- Kingdom: Animalia
- Phylum: Chordata
- Class: Reptilia
- Order: Squamata
- Suborder: Serpentes
- Family: Colubridae
- Genus: Trachischium
- Species: T. tenuiceps

Binomial name
- Trachischium tenuiceps (Blyth, 1854)

Synonyms
- Calamaria tenuiceps Blyth, 1854; Ablabes tenuiceps – Günther, 1864; Trachischium tenuiceps – Boulenger, 1890

= Trachischium tenuiceps =

Species of snake

Trachischium tenuiceps, also known as the yellowbelly worm-eating snake, is a species of colubrid snake found in South Asia and Tibet.

== Geographic range ==
It is found in Nepal, Bangladesh, northeast India (Darjeeling, Sikkim, Arunachal Pradesh [Mokto, Bomdir – Tawang district] ) and Tibet and possibly also in Bhutan.

== Description ==
Trachischium tenuiceps is blackish dorsally, and, as the common name implies, it is yellowish ventrally. The smooth dorsal scales are arranged in 13 rows, with males having keeled dorsal scales in the anal region. Ventrals 134–138; anal divided; subcaudals 34–39. Adults may attain 35 cm (14 inches) in total length, and have a tail 5 cm (2 inches) long.
