= Ganges Delta =

Delta of the Ganges River

Coordinates: 22°42′N 89°40′E

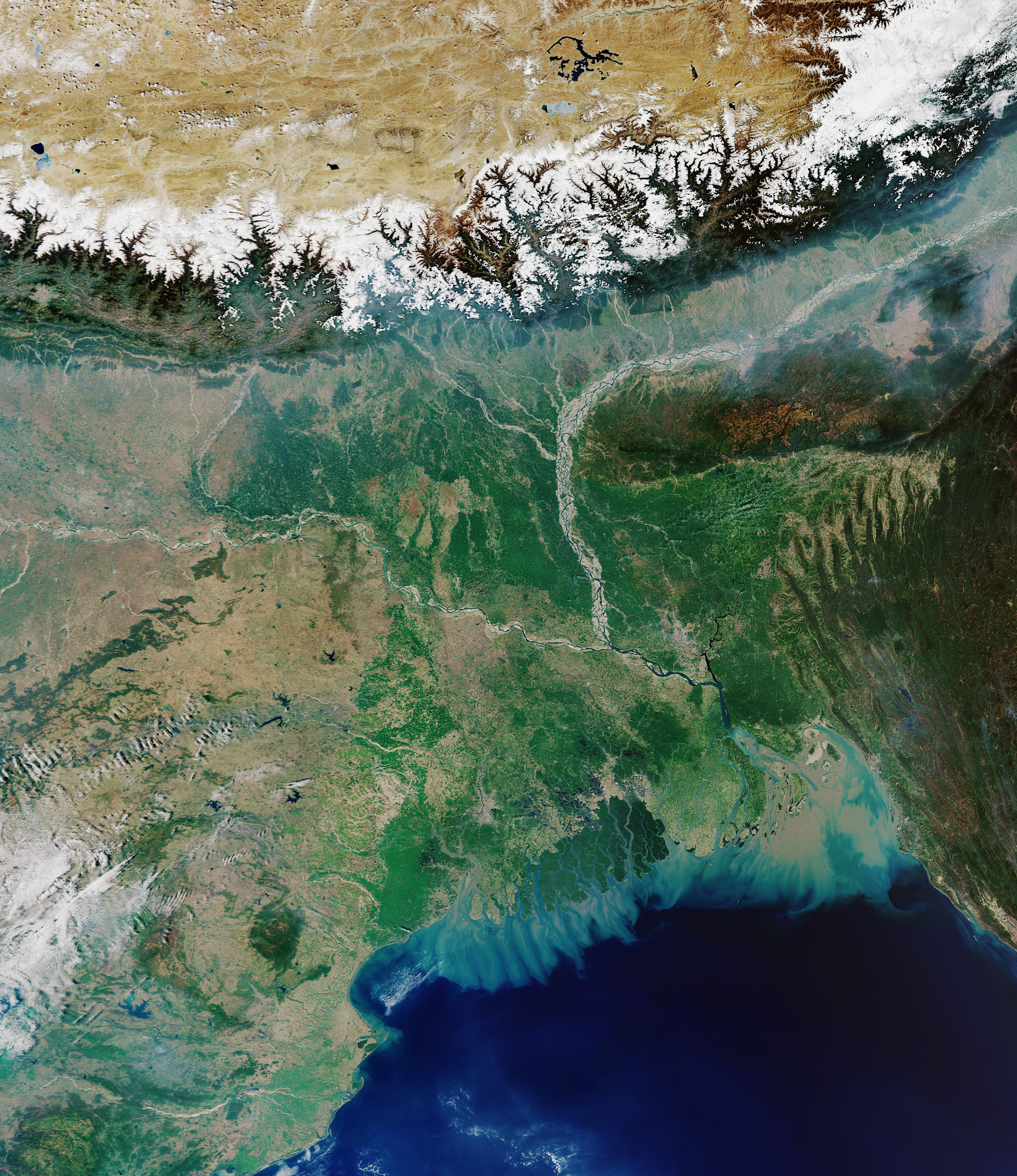
Ganges Delta, 2020 satellite photograph

The Ganges Delta (also known the Ganges-Brahmaputra Delta, the Sundarbans Delta or the Bengal Delta) is a river delta predominantly covering the Bengal region of the Indian subcontinent, consisting of Bangladesh and the Indian state of West Bengal. It is the world's largest river delta and it empties into the Bay of Bengal with the combined waters of several river systems, mainly those of the Brahmaputra River and the Ganges River. It is also one of the most fertile regions in the world, thus earning the nickname the Green Delta. The delta stretches from the Hooghly River in the west to as far as the Meghna River in the east.

== Geography and topography ==
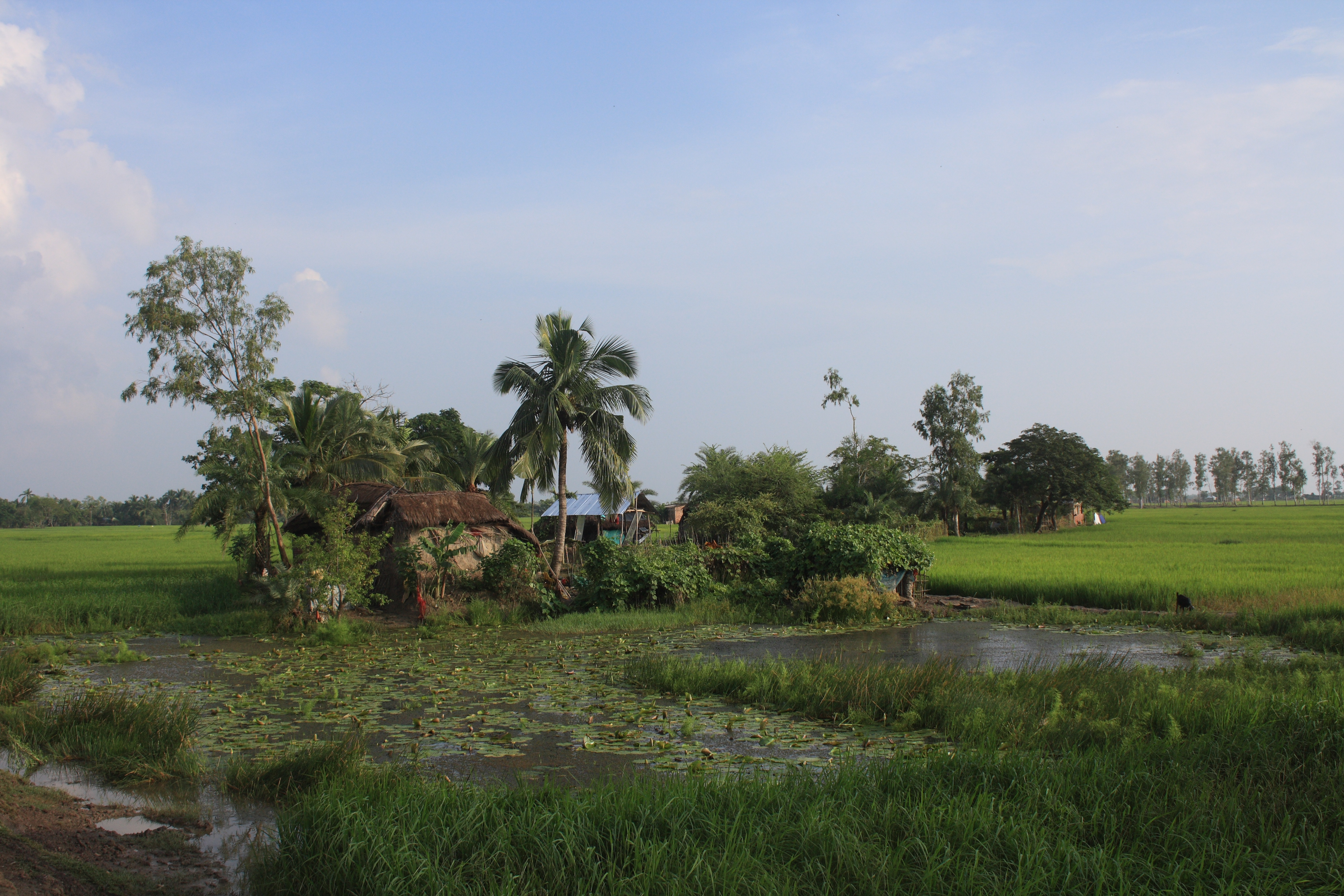
A typical landscape in the delta with palms, rice, flat, green and ponds

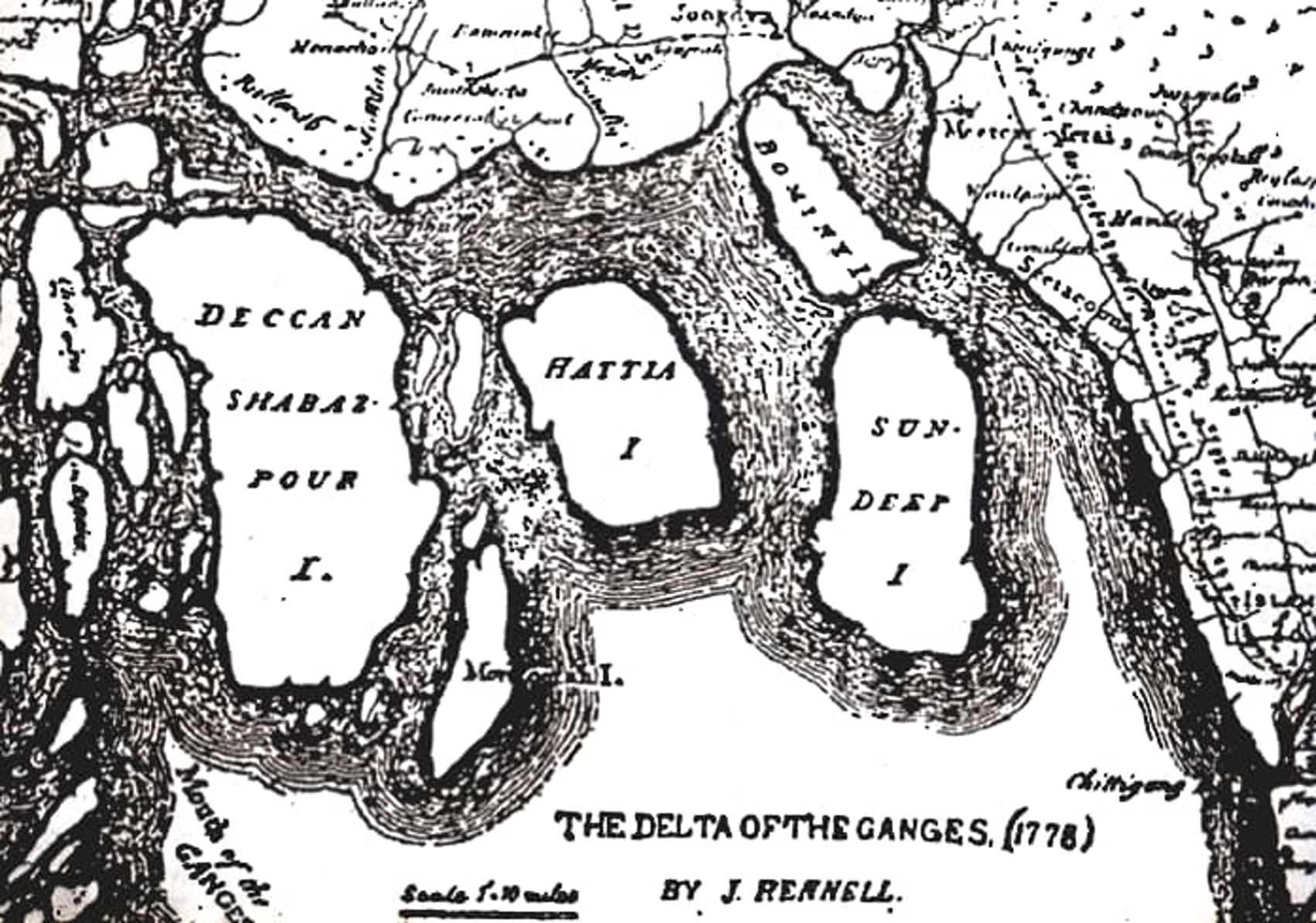
Delta of Ganges from the map of surveyor James Rennell (1778)

The Ganges Delta has the shape of a triangle and is considered to be "arcuate" (arc-shaped). It covers more than 105,000 km^{2} (41,000 sq mi) and lies mostly in Bangladesh and India, with rivers from Bhutan, Tibet, and Nepal draining into it from the north. 67% of the delta is inside Bangladesh and only 33% belongs to West Bengal. Most of the delta is composed of alluvial soils made up of small sediment particles that finally settle down as river currents slow in the estuary. Rivers carry these fine particles with them, even from their sources at glaciers as fluvio-glacial. Red and red-yellow laterite soils are found as one heads farther east. The soil has large amounts of minerals and nutrients, which are good for agriculture.

It is composed of a labyrinth of channels, swamps, lakes, and flood plain sediments (chars). The Gorai-Madhumati River, one of the distributaries of the Ganges, divides the Ganges Delta into two parts: the geologically young, active, eastern delta, and the older, less active, western delta.

== Population ==
Around 273.6 million (173.6 million Bangladesh and 100 million West Bengal, India) people live on the delta, despite risks from floods caused by monsoons, heavy run-off from the melting snows of the Himalayas, and North Indian Ocean tropical cyclones. 80% of the nation of Bangladesh lies in the Ganges Delta; many of the country's people depend on the delta for survival.

It is believed that upwards of 300 million people are supported by the Ganges Delta; approximately 400 million people live in the Ganges River Basin, making it the most populous river basin in the world. Most of the Ganges Delta has a population density greater than 200/km^{2} (520 people per square mile), making it one of the most densely populated regions in the world.

== Wildlife ==
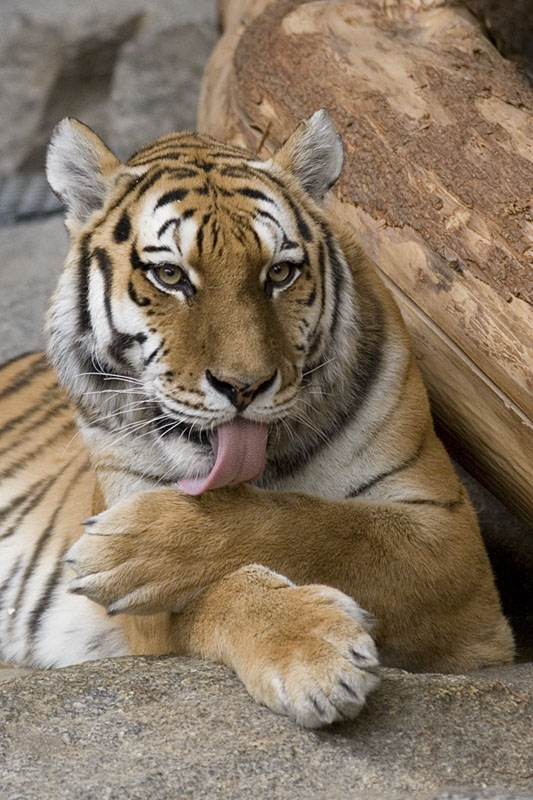
Bengal tiger

Three terrestrial ecoregions cover the delta region. The Lower Gangetic Plains moist deciduous forests ecoregion covers much of the delta, although most forests have been cleared for agriculture, leaving only small remnants. Thick stands of tall grasses, known as canebrakes, grow in wetter areas. The Sundarbans freshwater swamp forests ecoregion lies closer to the Bay of Bengal; this ecoregion is flooded with slightly brackish water during the dry season, and fresh water during the monsoon season. These forests, too, have been almost completely converted to intensive agriculture, with only 130 square kilometres (50 sq mi) of the 14,600 square kilometres (5,600 sq mi) protected. Where the delta meets the Bay of Bengal, Sundarbans mangroves form the world's largest mangrove ecoregion, covering an area of 20,400 square kilometres (7,900 sq mi) in a chain of 54 islands. They derive their name from the predominant mangrove species, Heritiera fomes, which are known locally as sundri or sundari.

Animals in the delta include the Indian python (Python molurus), clouded leopard (Neofelis nebulosa), Indian elephant (Elephas maximus indicus) and crocodiles, which live in the Sundarbans. Approximately 1,020 endangered Bengal tigers (Panthera tigris tigris) are believed to inhabit the Sundarbans. The golden jackal (Canis aureus) is one of the mammals found in the Sundarbans and is also seen along the canals and on the islands. Indian rhinos (Rhinoceros unicornis) were once present in the Sundarbans, but became locally extinct before 1920–1925 due to intensive hunting. Today, there are no rhino populations in the Sundarbans. The Ganges–Brahmaputra basin has tropical deciduous forests that yield valuable timber: sal, teak, and peepal trees are found in these areas.

It is estimated that 30,000 chital (Axis axis) are in the Sundarbans part of the delta. Birds found in the delta include kingfishers, eagles, woodpeckers, the shalik (Acridotheres tristis), the swamp francolin (Francolinus gularis), and the doel (Copsychus saularis). Two species of dolphin can be found in the delta: the Irrawaddy dolphin (Orcaella brevirostris) and the Ganges river dolphin (Platanista gangetica gangetica). The lesser adjutant (Leptoptilos javanicus) is present in the Sundarbans, albeit in small numbers. It is a vulnerable species that inhabits wetlands and mangroves, occasionally nesting in taller trees. The greater adjutant (Leptoptilos dubius), on the other hand, is now absent or, at best, extremely rare in the Sundarbans. Once widespread in Bengal, it now survives only in a few colonies in Assam and Cambodia. The Irrawaddy dolphin is an oceanic dolphin which enters the delta from the Bay of Bengal. The Ganges river dolphin is a true river dolphin, but is extremely rare and considered endangered.

Trees found in the delta include sundari, garjan (Rhizophora spp.), bamboo, mangrove palm (Nypa fruticans), mangrove date palm (Phoenix paludosa) and banyan (Ficus benghalensis).

== Geology ==
The Ganges Delta lies at the junction of three tectonic plates: the Indian Plate, the Eurasian Plate, and the Burma Plate. The edge of the Eocene paleoshelf runs approximately from Kolkata to the edge of the Shillong Plateau. The edge of the paleoshelf marks the transition from the thick continental crust in the northwest to the thin continental or oceanic crust in the southeast. The enormous sediment supply from the Himalayan collision has extended the delta about 400 kilometres (250 mi) seaward since the Eocene. The sediment thickness southeast of the edge of the paleoshelf beneath the Ganges Delta can exceed 16 km (9.9 mi).

== Economy ==
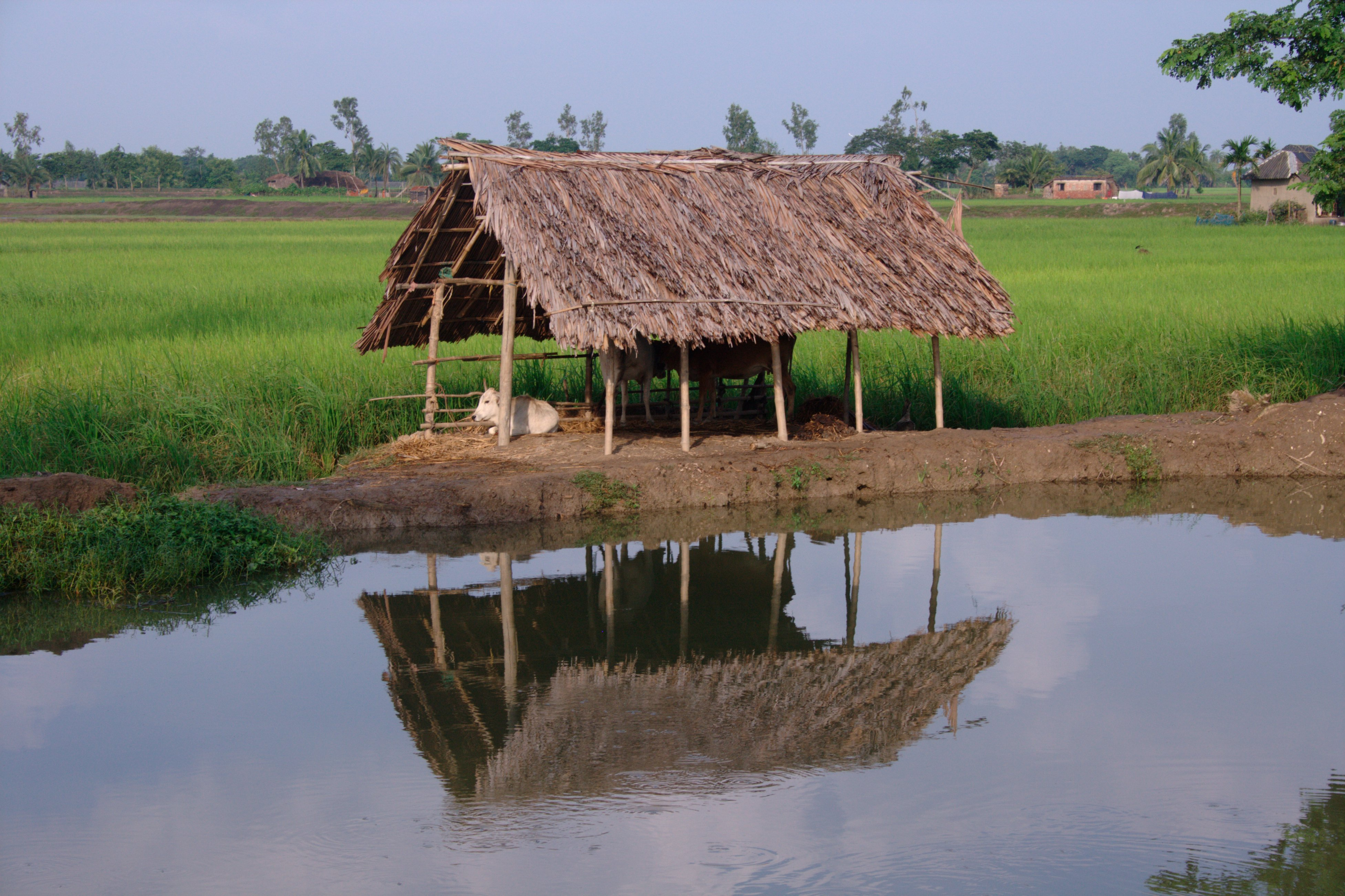
Rice, cattle and fishing in rivers and ponds are important sources of food.

Approximately two-thirds of the Bangladesh people work in agriculture and grow crops on the fertile floodplains of the delta. The major crops that are grown in the Ganges Delta are jute, tea, and rice. Fishing is also an important activity in the delta region, with fish being a major source of food for many of the people in the area.

In the last decades of the 20th century, scientists helped the poor people of the delta to improve fish farming methods. By turning unused ponds into viable fish farms and improving methods of raising fish in existing ponds, many people can now earn a living raising and selling fish. Using new systems, fish production in existing ponds has increased 800%. Shrimp are farmed in containers or cages that are submerged in open water. Most are exported.

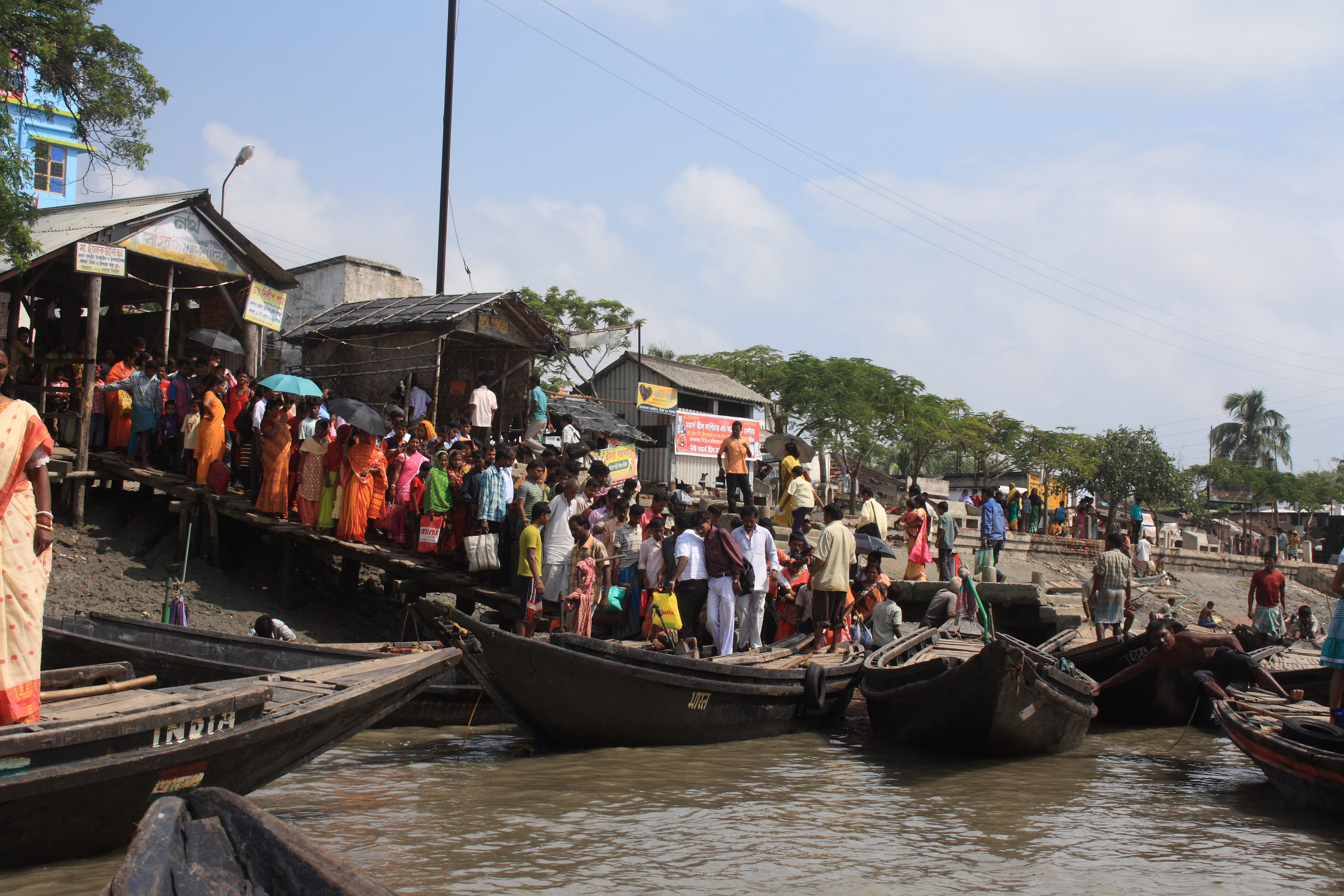
A lot of bustle at a ferry pier

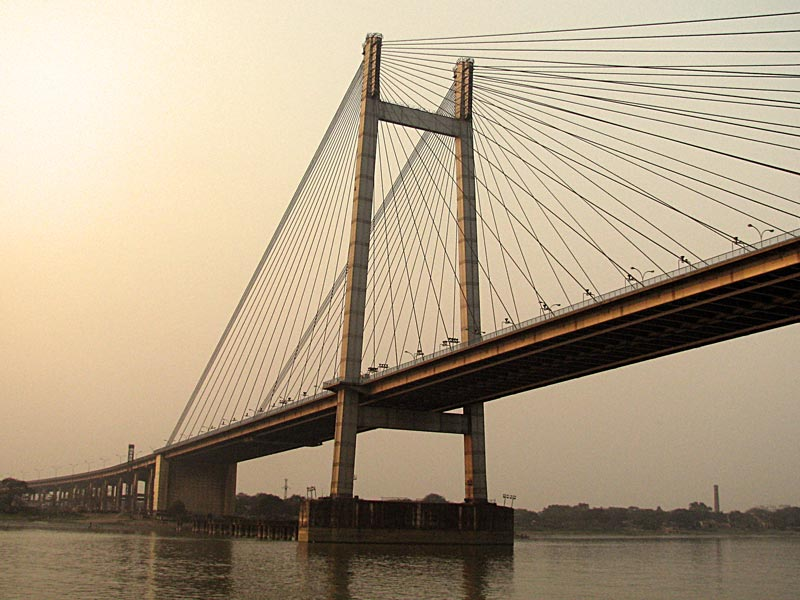
The Vidyasagar Setu which spans the Hoogli River in Kolkata

As there is a maze of many river branches, the area is difficult to pass. Most islands are only connected with the mainland by simple wooden ferryboats. Bridges are rare. Some islands are not yet connected to the electric grid, so island residents tend to use solar cells for a bit of electric supply.

=== Gas reserves ===
Important gas reserves have been discovered in the delta, such as in the Titas and Bakhrabad gas fields. Several major oil companies have invested in exploration of the Ganges Delta region.

=== Arsenic pollution ===
Arsenic is a naturally occurring substance in the Ganga Delta that has detrimental effects on health and may enter the food chain, especially in key crops such as rice.

== Climate ==
The Ganges Delta lies mostly in the tropical wet climate zone, and receives between 1,500 to 2,000 mm (59 to 79 in) of rainfall each year in the western part, and 2,000 to 3,000 mm (79 to 118 in) in the eastern part.. Hot, dry summers and cool, dry winters make the climate suitable for agriculture.

=== Cyclones and flooding ===
In November 1970, the deadliest tropical cyclone of the twentieth century hit the Ganges Delta region. The 1970 Bhola cyclone killed 500,000 people (official death toll), with another 100,000 missing. The Guinness Book of World Records estimated the total loss of human life from the Bhola cyclone at 1,000,000.

Another cyclone hit the delta in 1991, killing about 139,000 people. It also left many people homeless.

In 1998, the Ganges flooded the delta, killing about 1,000 people and leaving more than 30 million people homeless. The Bangladesh government asked for $900 million to help feed the people of the region, as the entire rice crop was lost. Major floods also occurred in 1953, 1987, 1988, 2004, 2007 and 2017.

== Environmental history ==
=== Colonial period ===
From the late 1600s, the delta was colonized by the East India Company, whose governance relied on zamindars. Whereas the inhabitants used to build temporary levees, which were breached each monsoon season, colonial rule promoted the construction of permanent levees. This increased agricultural productivity in the short run, but interfered with sedimentation, which naturally fertilizes and raises the land, compensating subsidence. In the 19th century, the British state promoted the construction of railroads, which led to more levees, fewer forests, more stagnant wetland, and the spreading of malaria.

=== Coastal Embankment Project ===
From the 1960s, Western governments and aid organizations, in particular USAID, funded the large-scale construction of polders and levees. Their plans followed the Dutch model, and neglected the role of rivers. Rivers were channeled between embankments, and tended to choke in their own sediments, instead of spreading them across the delta.

Due to insufficient sedimentation, saltwater from tidal rivers intruded in rice paddies, leading the Bangladeshi government and foreign aid organizations to encourage the replacement of agriculture by shrimp aquaculture from the 1980s. As an export commodity, shrimp helps transfer wealth to landowners, while farmers, crops and livestock suffer from the increased salinity.

The Coastal Embankment Project did not lead to a decrease of damage from flooding in the coastal zone.

=== Tidal river management and de-poldering ===
In the 1990s, starting at Beel Dakatia, villagers defied the Bangladeshi government and cut embankments. Since then, tidal river management has been introduced in the delta. This method has been implemented in 5 beels and resulted in benefits including decreased waterlogging, creation of agricultural areas, improved navigation and land creation.

Tidal river management has been promoted by Bangladeshi prime minister Sheikh Hasina, and implemented by the Water Board.

=== More recent infrastructure plans ===
Since 2013, the World Bank has invested in the Coastal Embankment Improvement Project, whose aim is to strengthen levees. Moreover, in 2018, Bangladesh adopted the Delta Plan 2100, jointly produced with the Netherlands, and which prescribes the construction of massive concrete dams, and new polders.

Past failures of such infrastructures are sometimes blamed on climate change, although they are more often due to mismanagement and infrastructure maladaptation. The World Bank plans only account for 15 years worth of sea level rise, and only cover the cost of construction, leaving repairs to the community.

=== Threat of rising sea levels ===
Rising sea levels caused by climate change threaten the delta and its inhabitants. An increase in sea level of 0.5 metres (1 ft 8 in) could result in six million people losing their homes in Bangladesh.

=== Historiography ===
The history of the Bengal Delta has been a concern of scholarship by environmental historians, although mostly limited to the 18th to 21st centuries.

Indian historian Vinita Damodaran has extensively profiled famine management practices by the East India Company, and related these practices to major ecological changes wrought about by forest and land management practices. Debjani Bhattacharyya has shown how Calcutta was constructed as an urban centre through tracing ecological changes wrought upon by colonial powers involving land, water and humans throughout the mid-18th to the early 20th centuries.

In terms of recent scholarship that focuses more on the eastern part of the Bengal/Ganges Delta, Iftekhar Iqbal argues for the inclusion of the Bengal Delta as an ecological framework within which to study the dynamics of agrarian prosperity or decline, communal conflicts, poverty and famine, especially throughout the colonial period. Iqbal has tried to show how resistance movements such as the Faraizi movement can be studied in relation to colonial ecological management practices.

== View ==
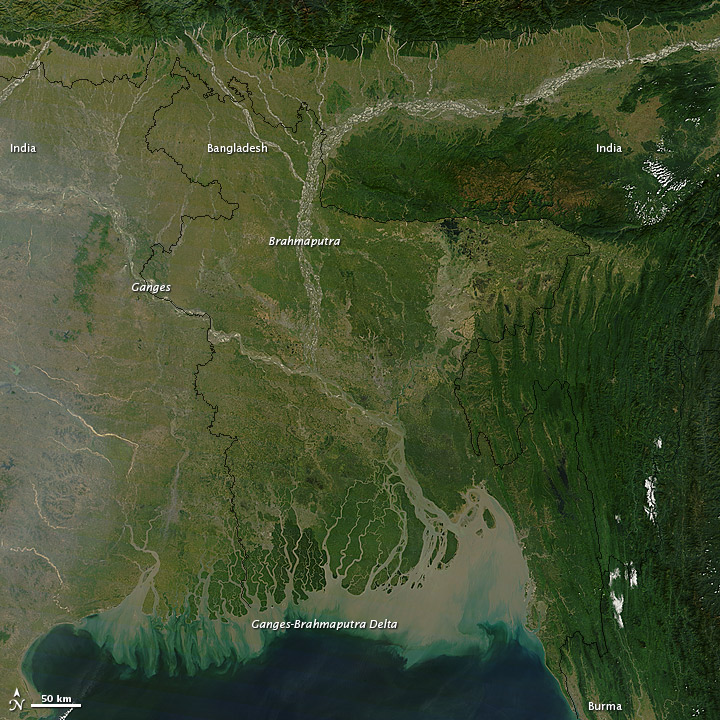
Ganga/Padma River from space

== See also ==
- Doab
- Gangotri
- Indo-Gangetic Plain
- Indian subcontinent
- Bay of Bengal
- Bengal tiger
