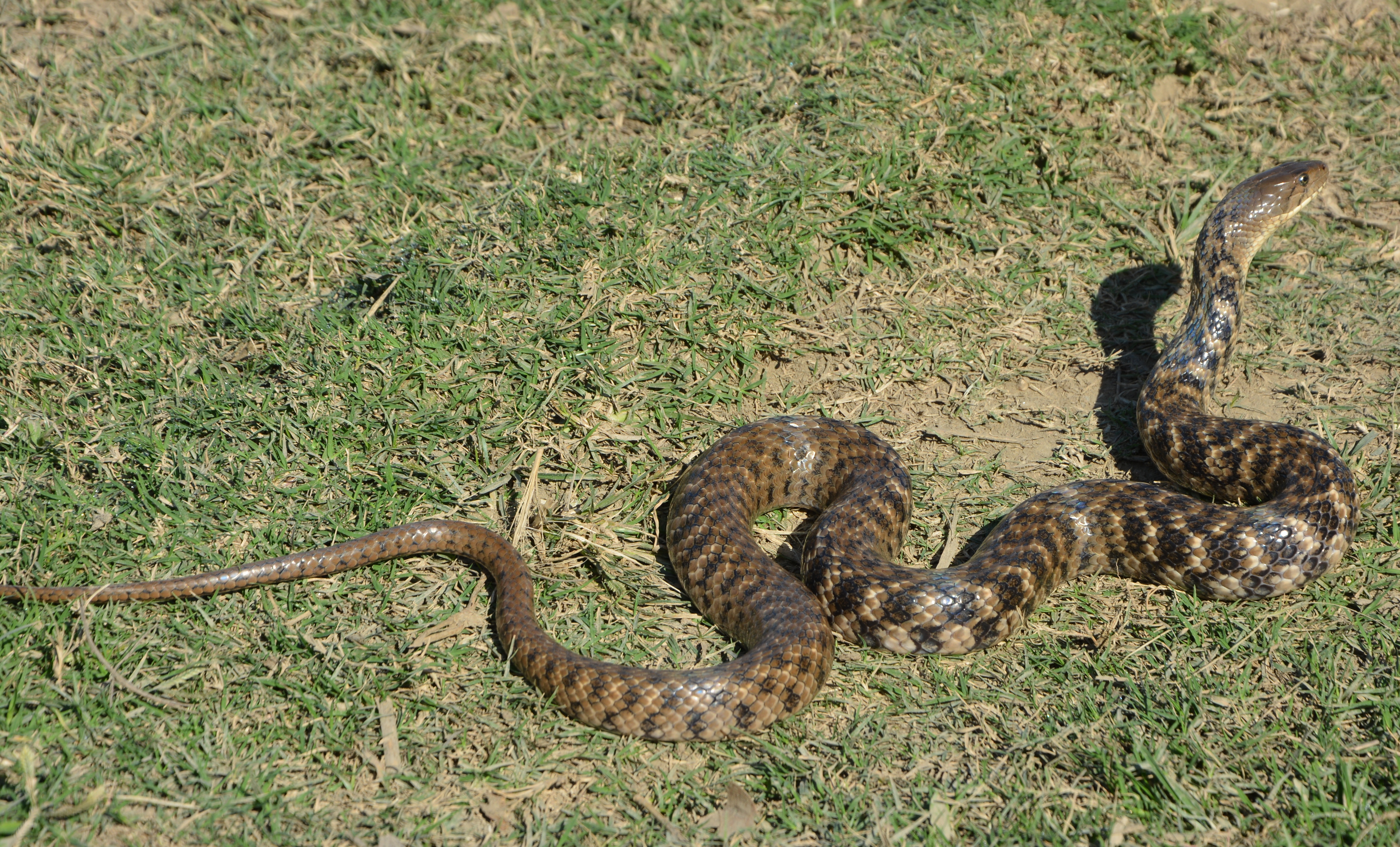
- in Assam

Conservation status
- Least Concern (IUCN 3.1)

Scientific classification
- Kingdom: Animalia
- Phylum: Chordata
- Class: Reptilia
- Order: Squamata
- Suborder: Serpentes
- Family: Colubridae
- Genus: Fowlea
- Species: F. piscator

Binomial name
- Fowlea piscator (Schneider, 1799)

Synonyms
- List: Hydrus piscator Schneider, 1799; Natrix piscator — Merrem, 1820; Tropidonotus quincunciatus Schlegel, 1837; Tropidonotus piscator — Boulenger, 1893; Nerodia piscator — Wall, 1921; Xenochrophis piscator — Cox et al., 1998

= Checkered keelback =

Species of snake

The checkered keelback (Fowlea piscator), also known commonly as the Asiatic water snake, is a common species in the subfamily Natricinae of the family Colubridae. The species is endemic to Asia. It is non-venomous.

== Description ==
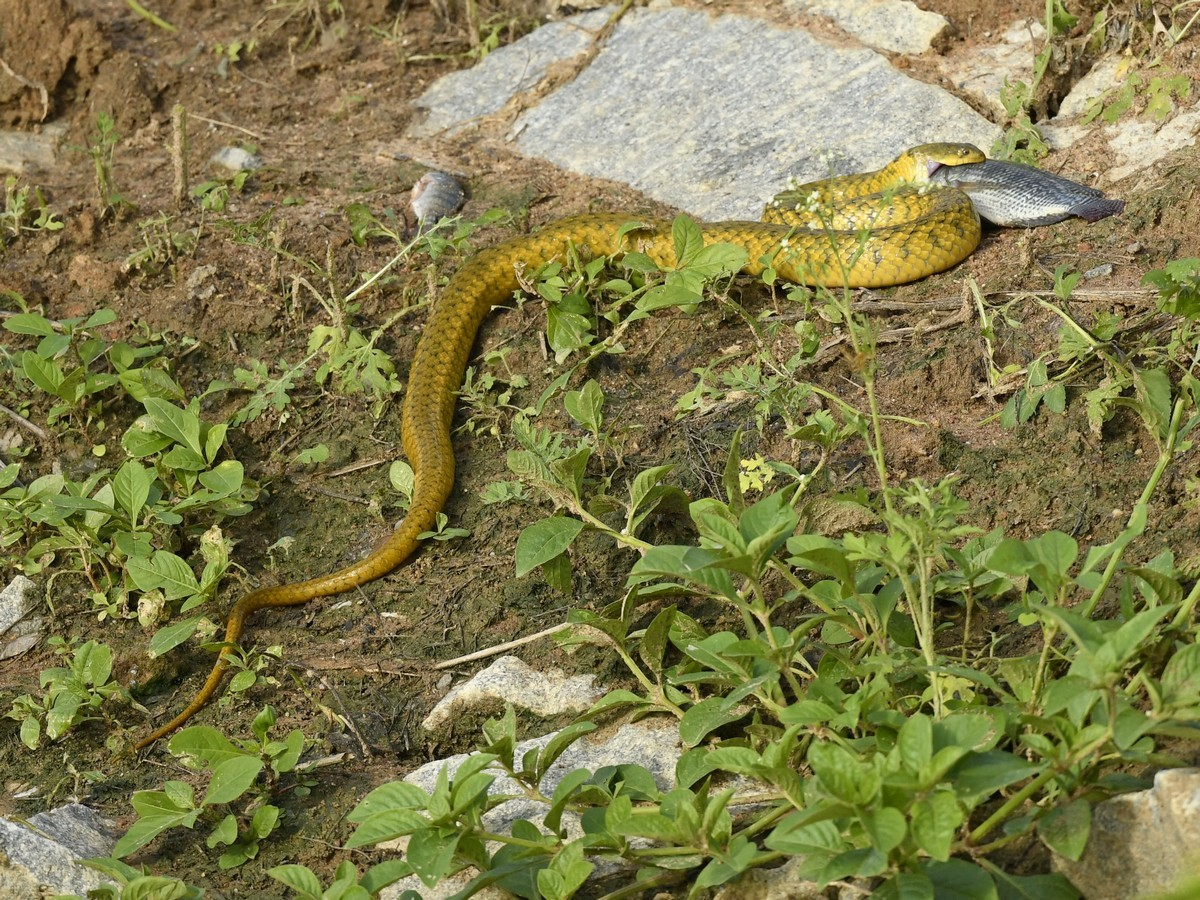
Eating a fish, in Karnataka

The eye of F. piscator is rather small and shorter than its distance from the nostril in the adult. Its rostral scale is visible from above. The internasal scales are much narrowed anteriorly and subtriangular, with the anterior angle truncated and as long as the prefrontal scales. The frontal scale is longer than its distance from the end of the snout, and as long as the parietals or a little shorter. The loreal is nearly as long as it is deep. There are one preocular and three (rarely four) post-oculars. Its temporals are 2+2 or 2+3. There are normally nine upper labials, with the fourth and fifth entering the eye; and five lower labials in contact with the anterior chin-shields, which are shorter than the posterior. The dorsal scales are arranged in 19 rows, strongly keeled, with outer rows smooth. The ventrals number 125–158, the anal is divided, and the subcaudals number 64–90. Coloration is very variable, consisting of dark spots arranged quincuncially and often separated by a whitish network, or of black longitudinal bands on a pale ground, or of dark crossbands, with or without whitish spots. Two oblique black streaks, one below and the other behind the eye, are nearly constant. The lower parts are white, with or without black margins to the shields.

The checkered keelback is a medium-sized snake, but may grow to be large. Adults may attain a snout-to-vent length (SVL) of 1.75 m (5.7 ft).

== Defensive behavior ==
Aggressive when threatened or cornered. Most of the time this snake tries to raise its head as much as possible and expand its neck skin mimicking a cobra hood and intimidate the threat. Though it is non-venomous to humans, it can deliver a painful bite which is inflammatory.

F. piscator may lose its tail as an escape mechanism. A rare case of such autotomy is reported from Vietnam.

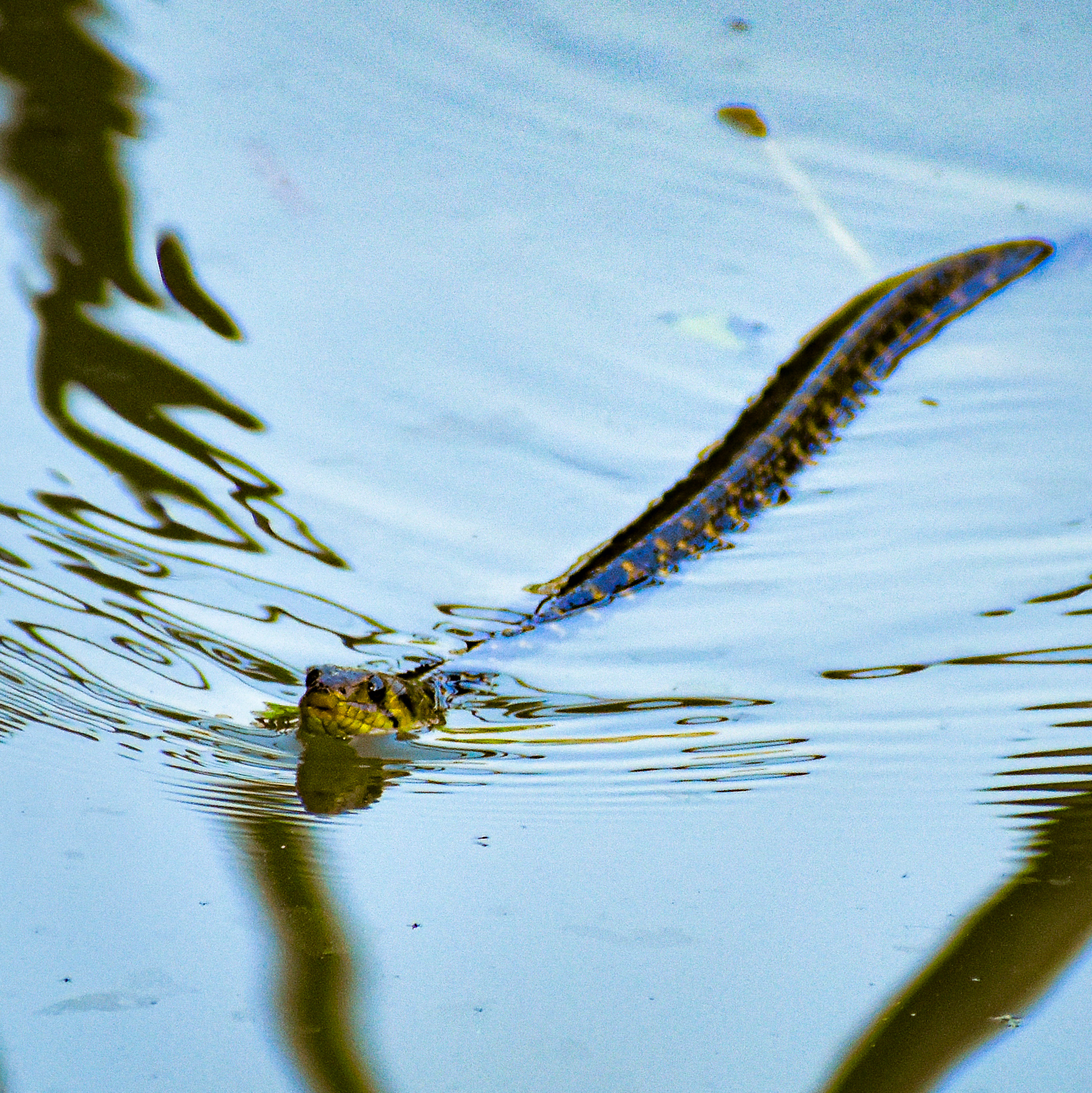
A checkered keelback (locally known as "Joldhora") swimming at Beel Dakatia, Khulna, Bangladesh

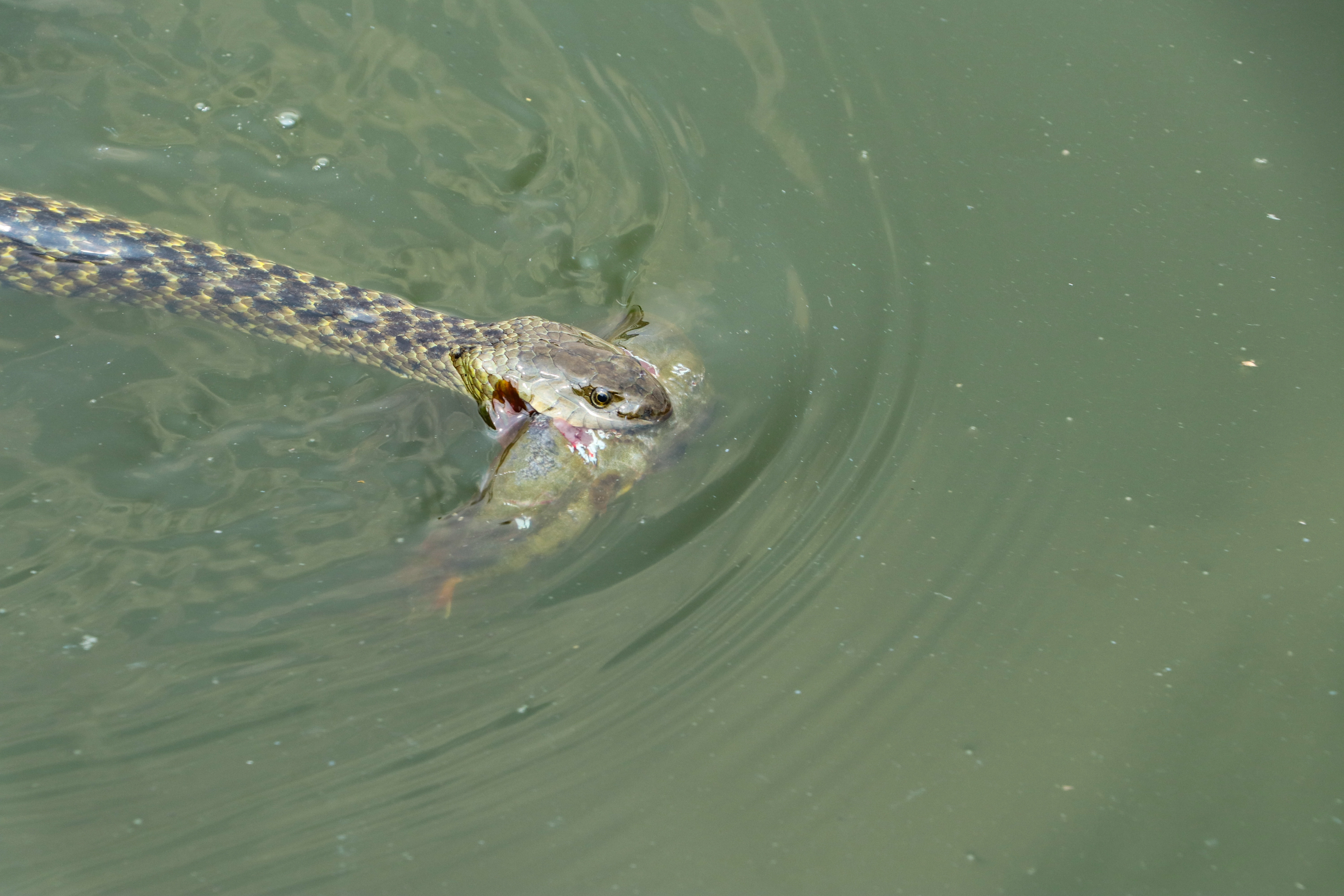
With catfish kill, Kathmandu

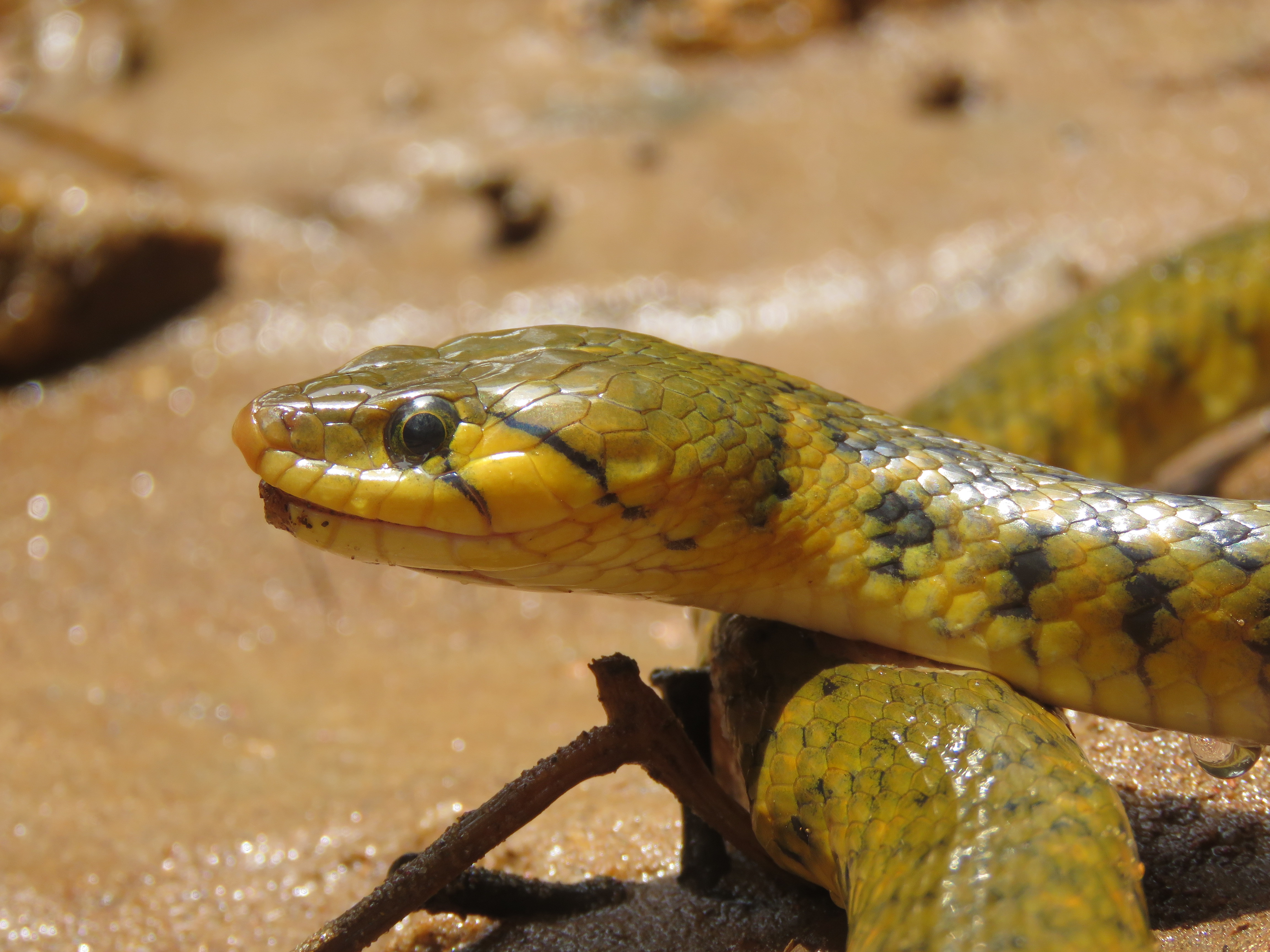
In Kerala

== Habitat ==
Active by day and night. The preferred habitat of F. piscator is in or near freshwater bodies and paddy fields.

== Diet ==
F. piscator feeds mainly on fish, amphibians and arthropods, occasionally on rodents and amphibian eggs, and rarely on birds and juvenile Indian peacock softshell turtles.

== Reproduction ==
F. piscator is oviparous. Clutch size is usually 30-70 eggs, but may be as few as 4 or as many as 100. Egg size is also variable. Each egg may be 1.5–4.0 cm (0.59–1.57 in) long. The female guards the eggs until they hatch in 60–70 days. Each hatchling is about 11 cm (4.3 in) long.

== Geographic range ==
F. piscator is found in Afghanistan, Bangladesh, Pakistan, Sri Lanka, India, Myanmar, Nepal, Thailand, Laos, Cambodia, Vietnam, West Malaysia, China (Zhejiang, Jiangxi, Fujian, Guangdong, Hainan, Guangxi, Yunnan), Taiwan, and Indonesia (Sumatra, Java, Borneo, Celebes = Sulawesi).

type locality: "East Indies", restricted by geographic inference to the northern coastal areas of Andhra Pradesh State, eastern India.

== Taxonomy ==
The subspecies F. p. melanzostus was raised to species status, as Fowlea melanzostus, by Indraneil Das in 1996. There is no subspecies known.

== Gallery for identification characteristics ==
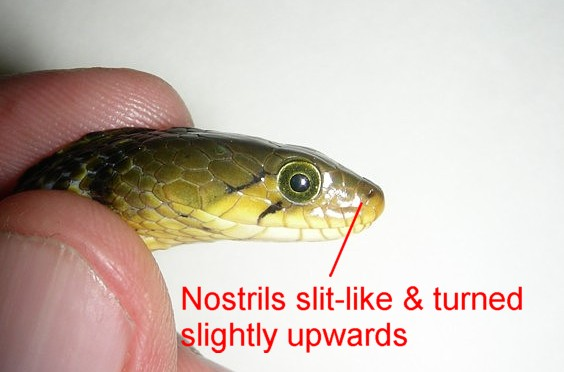
Chart 1 - Nostrils directed slightly upwards

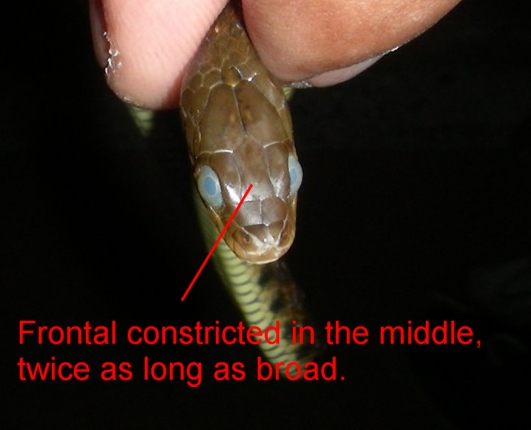
Chart 2 - Frontal constricted in the middle, twice as long as broad

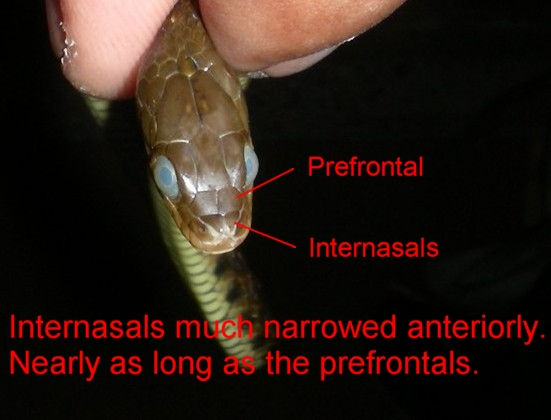
Chart 3 - Internasals much narrowed anteriorly, nearly as long as the prefrontals

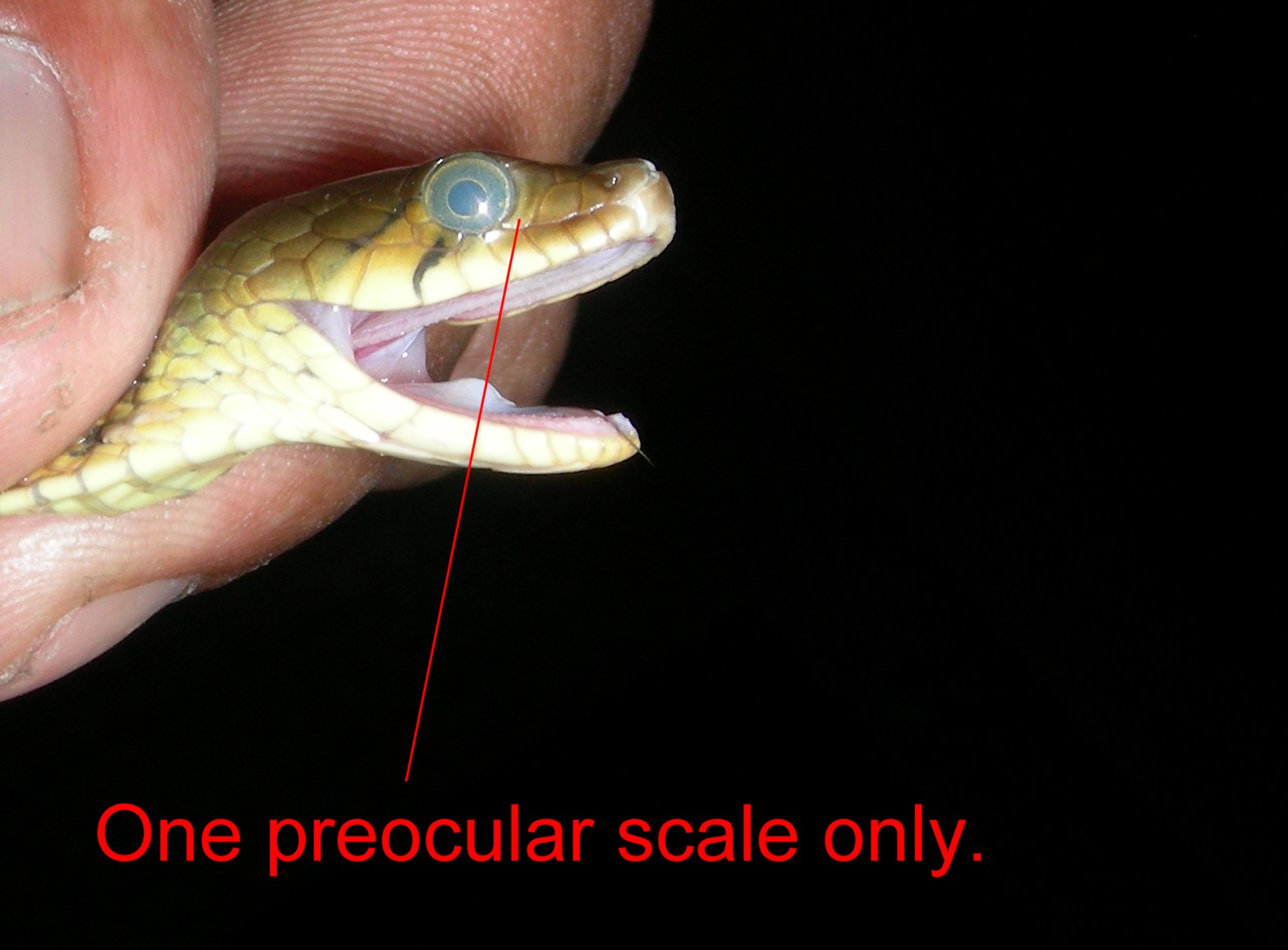
Chart 4 - One preocular scale only

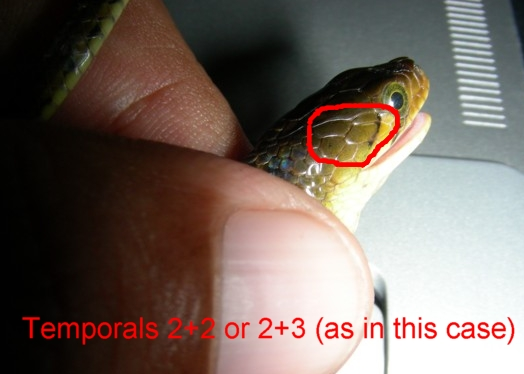
Chart 5 - Temporals are 2+2 or 2+3

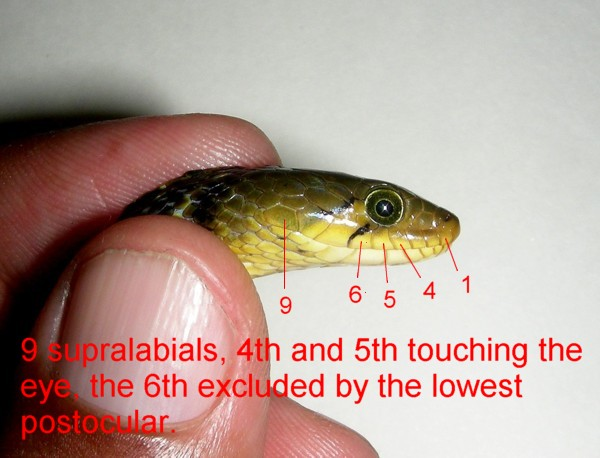
Chart 6 - 9 supralabials, 4th and 5th touching the eye, the 6th excluded by the lowest postocular

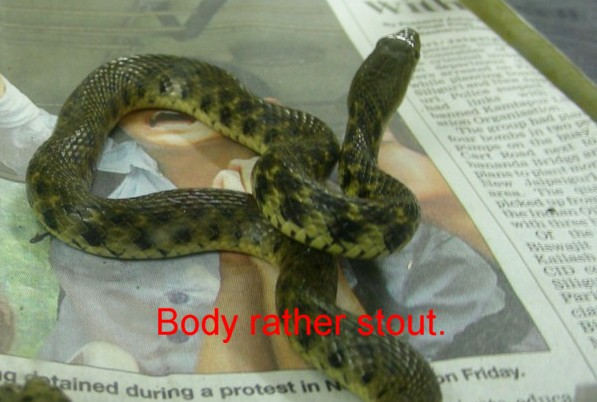
Chart 7 - Body rather stout

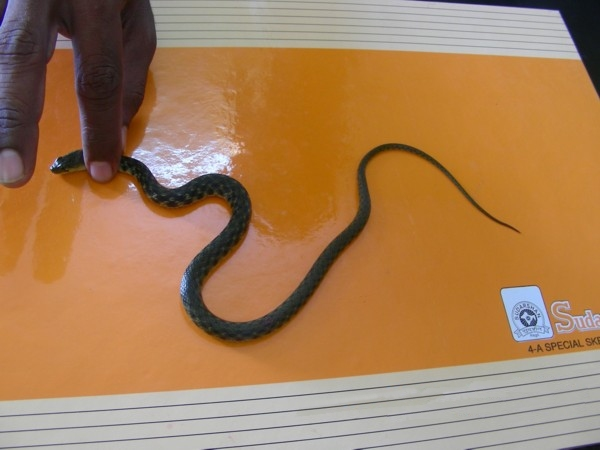
Chart 8 - Small tail

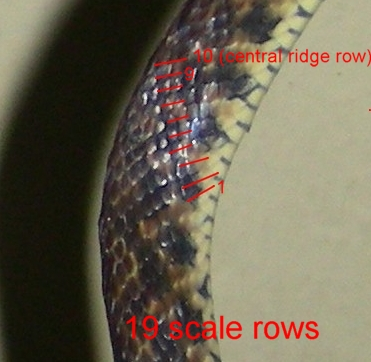
Chart 9 - Scales in 19 distinct rows

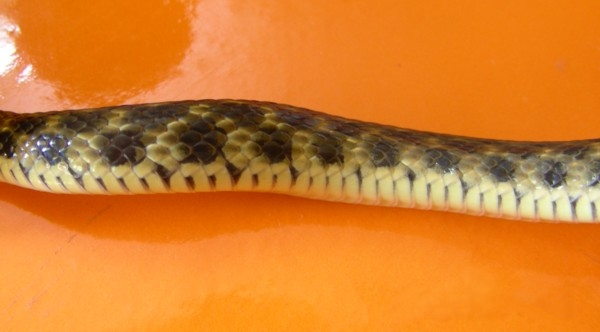
Body of checkered keelback

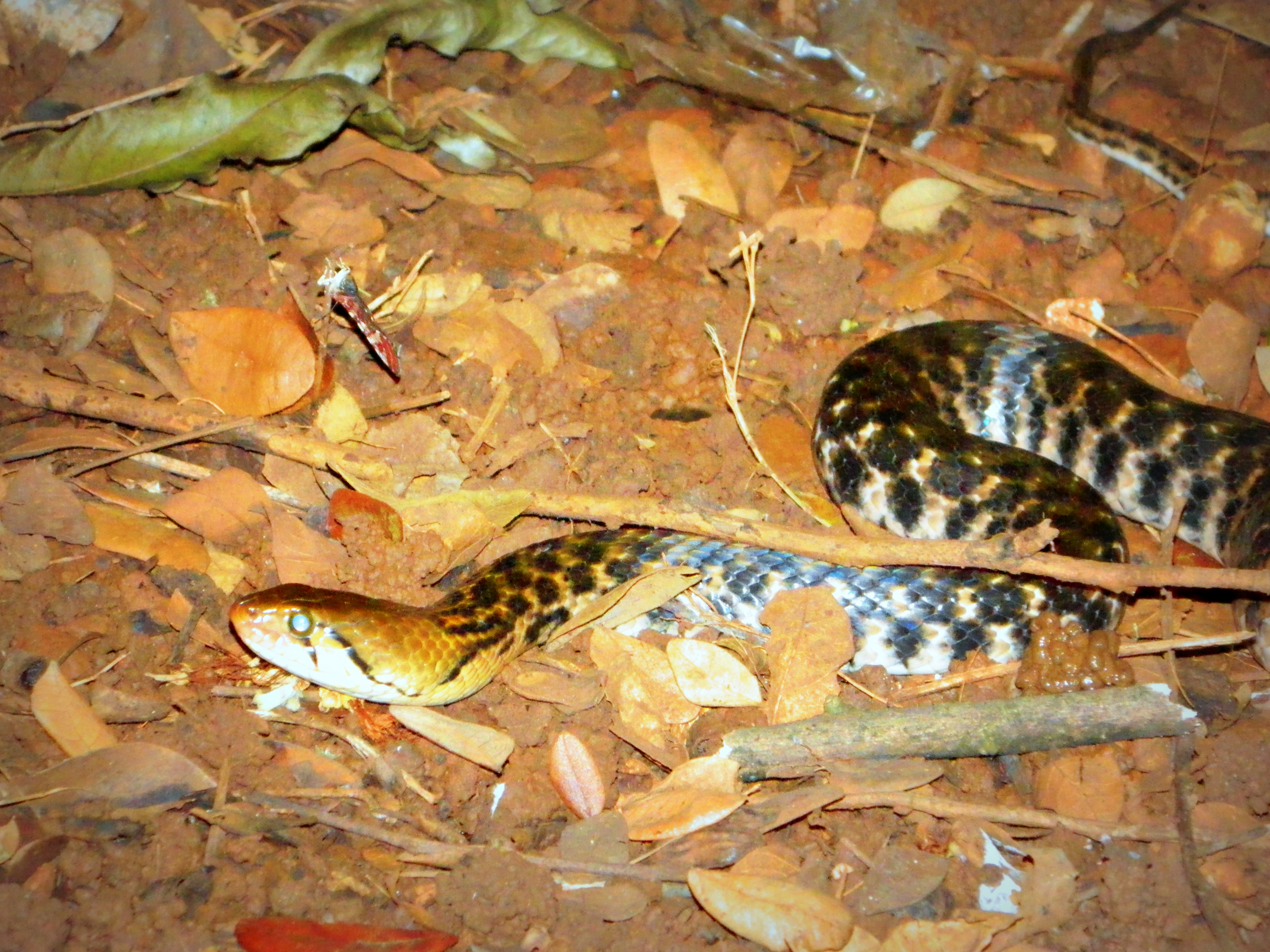

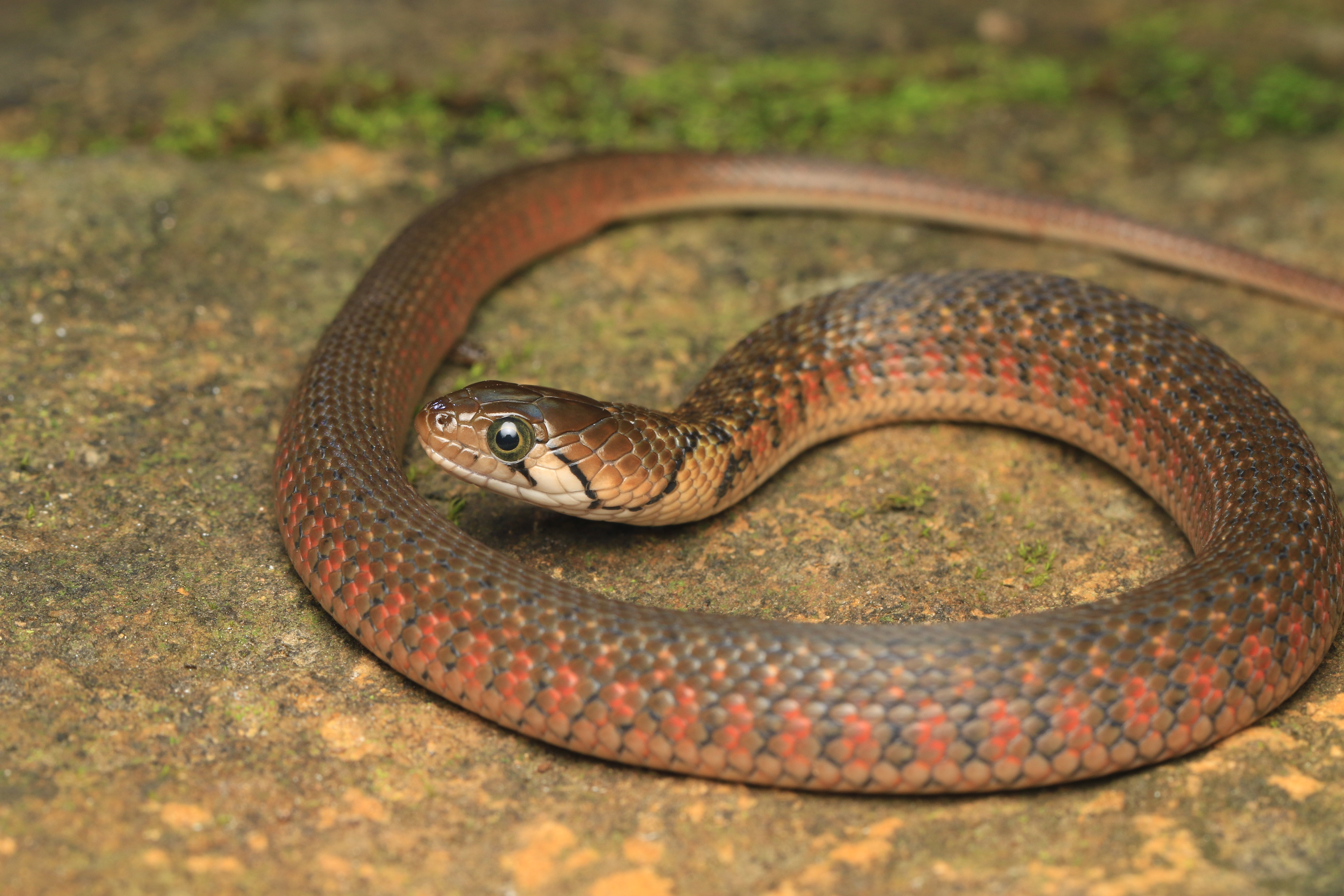
Juvenile

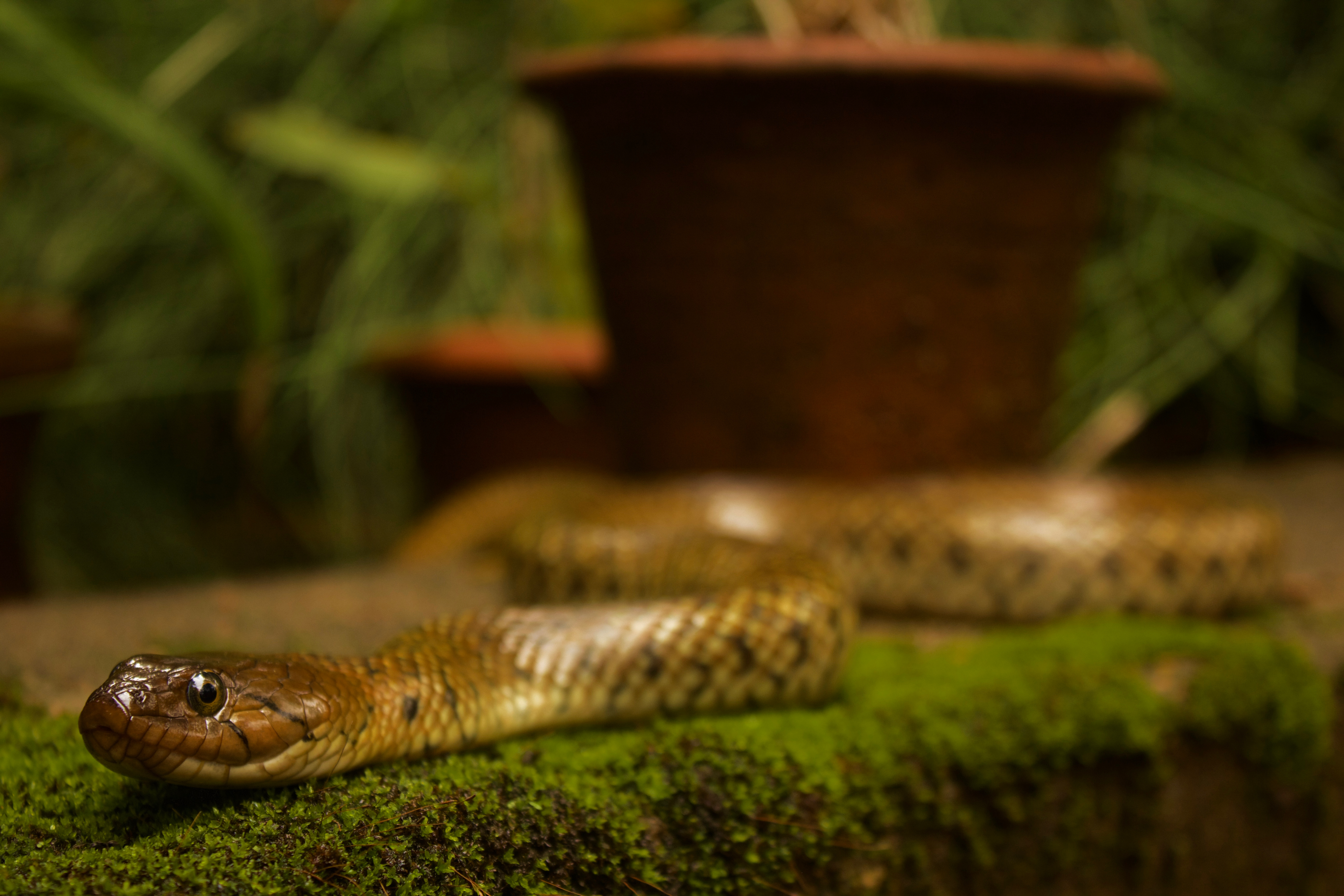
Checkered keelback basking

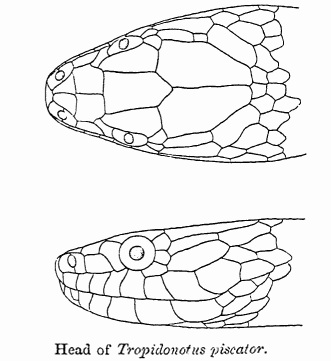
Scale pattern

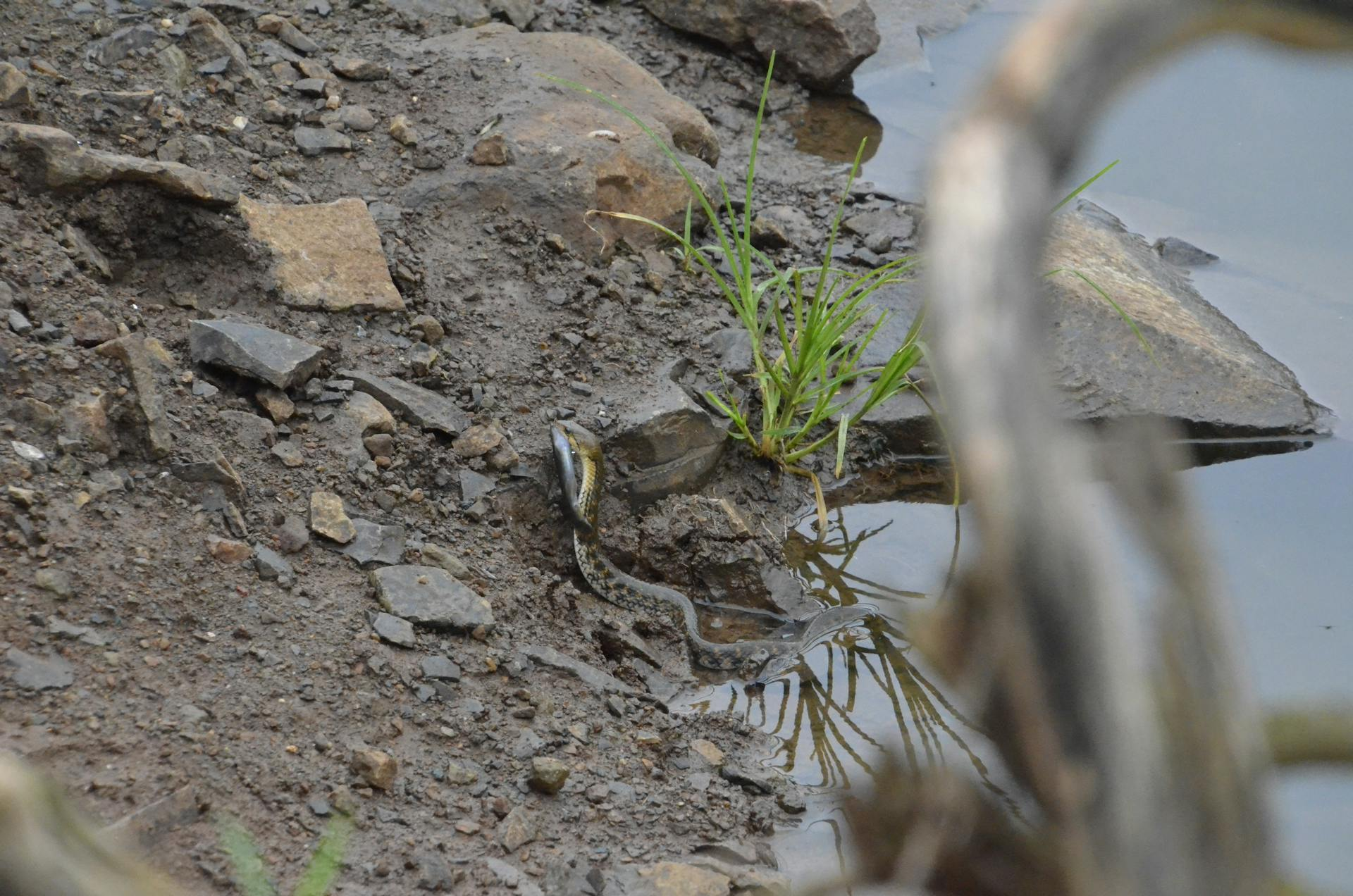
checkered keelback with fish
