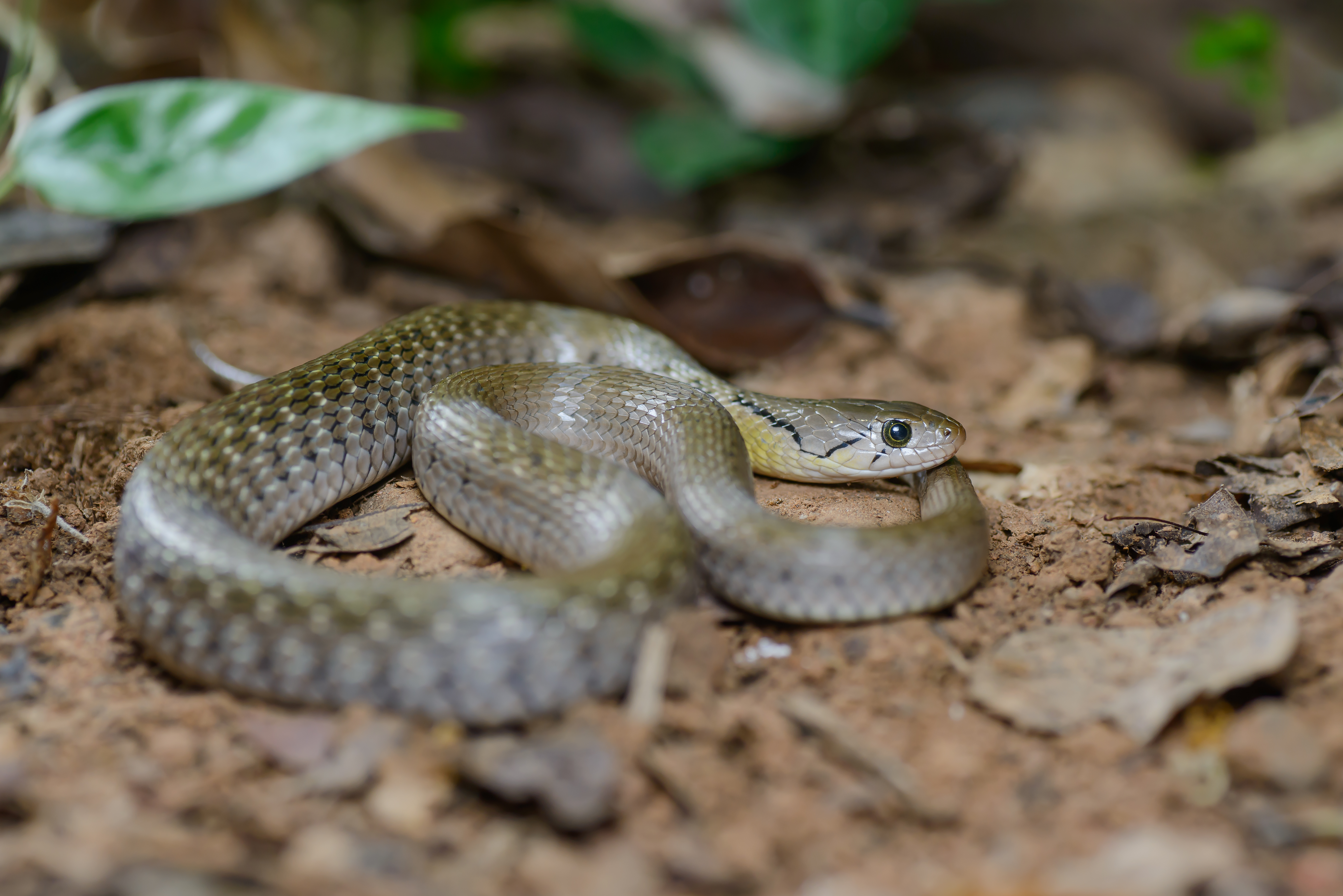

Conservation status
- Least Concern (IUCN 3.1)

Scientific classification
- Kingdom: Animalia
- Phylum: Chordata
- Class: Reptilia
- Order: Squamata
- Suborder: Serpentes
- Family: Colubridae
- Genus: Fowlea
- Species: F. flavipunctata

Binomial name
- Fowlea flavipunctata (Hallowell, 1860)

= Yellow-spotted keelback =

Species of snake

The yellow-spotted keelback (Fowlea flavipunctata) is a species of colubrid snake found in Thailand, Myanmar, China, West Malaysia, Laos, Cambodia, Vietnam, and Bangladesh. Its type locality is: Island of Hong Kong (Hong Kong) and Canton River?, China.

IUCN includes Taiwan in the range of F. flavipunctata, but excludes Malaysia and Bangladesh.

F. f. schnurrenbergeri of Nepal is now considered an independent species, Fowlea schnurrenbergeri.

== Habitat and behaviour ==
F. flavipunctata is a semiaquatic snake that occurs in slow rivers and streams, marshes, swamps, ponds, and lakes. It thrives also in wet human-modified habitats, including rice fields and ditches. It feeds on fish and frogs. It is diurnal.

== Relations with humans ==
F. flavipunctata is exploited in parts of its range to support snake farms and pigs and for use in snake wine.
