= Fowlea unicolor =

Scientific classification
- Kingdom: Animalia
- Phylum: Chordata
- Class: Reptilia
- Order: Squamata
- Suborder: Serpentes
- Family: Colubridae
- Genus: Fowlea
- Species: F. unicolor

Binomial name
- Fowlea unicolor (Müller, 1887)

Species of snake

Fowlea unicolor is a species of snake in the family Colubridae. As currently known, it is endemic to Sri Lanka, although it might also occur in southern India.
