= Fowlea yunnanensis =

Conservation status
- Least Concern (IUCN 3.1)

Scientific classification
- Kingdom: Animalia
- Phylum: Chordata
- Class: Reptilia
- Order: Squamata
- Suborder: Serpentes
- Family: Colubridae
- Genus: Fowlea
- Species: F. yunnanensis

Binomial name
- Fowlea yunnanensis Anderson, 1879

Synonyms
- Atretium schistosum var. yunnanensis Anderson, 1879; Atretium yunnanensis Anderson, 1879

Species of snake

Fowlea yunnanensis (common name Yunnan olive keelback) is a species of snake in the family Colubridae. It is found in the Lianghe and Longchuan Counties of southwestern Yunnan, China; its range could extend into Myanmar. It occurs at elevations of 800–1,400 m (2,600–4,600 ft) above sea level and is often found in rice fields, ponds and marshes of valleys, basins, and subalpine areas.
