= St. John's keelback =

Conservation status
- Least Concern (IUCN 3.1)

Scientific classification
- Kingdom: Animalia
- Phylum: Chordata
- Class: Reptilia
- Order: Squamata
- Suborder: Serpentes
- Family: Colubridae
- Genus: Fowlea
- Species: F. sanctijohannis

Binomial name
- Fowlea sanctijohannis (Boulenger, 1890)

Synonyms
- Tropidonotus sancti-johannis Boulenger, 1890; Nerodia piscator sancti-johannis — Bourret, 1935; Natrix piscator sancti-johannis — Bourret, 1936; Xenochrophis piscator sanctijohannis — Kramer, 1977; Xenochrophis sanctijohannis — I. Das, 1996; Fowlea sanctijohannis — Purkayastha et al., 2018

Species of snake

St. John's keelback (Fowlea sanctijohannis) is a species of snake in the subfamily Natricinae of the family Colubridae. The species is endemic to Asia.

== Etymology ==
The specific name, sanctijohannis, is in honor of British naturalist Oliver Beauchamp Coventry St. John.

== Geographic range ==
F. sanctijohannis is found in Bhutan, northern India (Himachal Pradesh, Jammu and Kashmir), northern Myanmar, Nepal, and Pakistan.

== Habitat ==
The preferred natural habitat of F. sanctijohannis is freshwater wetlands, at altitudes of 960–2,200 m (3,150–7,220 ft).

== Reproduction ==
F. sanctijohannis is oviparous.
