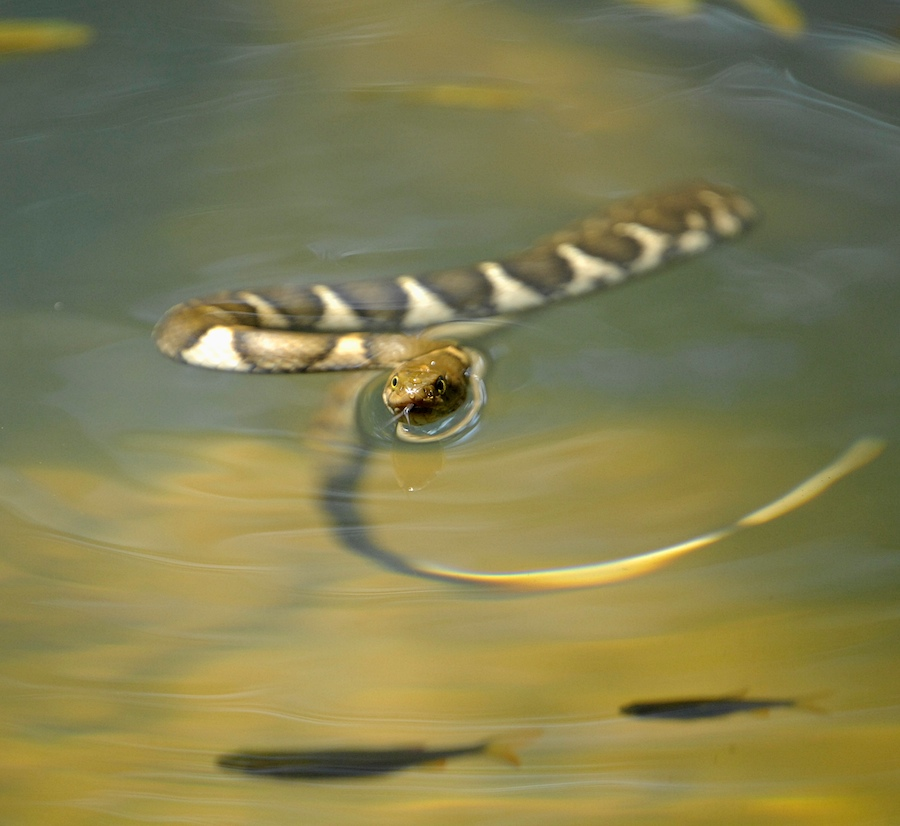
- Fowlea asperrimus Taken by: Gunnar Pettersson(Wildlife Artist) at Sinharaja, Sri Lanka on 2008-02-19.

Conservation status
- Least Concern (IUCN 3.1)

Scientific classification
- Kingdom: Animalia
- Phylum: Chordata
- Class: Reptilia
- Order: Squamata
- Suborder: Serpentes
- Family: Colubridae
- Genus: Fowlea
- Species: F. asperrima

Binomial name
- Fowlea asperrima (Boulenger, 1891)

Synonyms
- Tropidonotus asperrimus Boulenger, 1891: 281; Natrix piscator asperrimus — M.A. Smith, 1943; Natrix asperrimus — Taylor, 1950: 567; Xenochrophis asperrimus — Das 1996: 59; Fowlea asperrimus — Purkayastha et al., 2019

= Boulenger's keelback =

Species of snake

Boulenger's keelback (Fowlea asperrima), also known commonly as the Sri Lankan keelback, is a species of water snake in the family Colubridae. The species is endemic to Sri Lanka.

== Etymology ==
The common name "Boulenger's keelback" is in honour of Belgian-born British herpetologist George Albert Boulenger.

== Habitat ==
F. asperrima is found in Sri Lanka, in both dry and wet climatic zones up to 1,000 m (3,300 ft) above mean sea level. It is abundant in waterways, such as flooded rice fields, ponds, lakes, marshes, rivers and streams.

== Characteristics ==
The body of F. asperrima is short and cylindrical, and has a clear neck and slightly pointed head. The eyes have rounded pupils, and the nostrils are narrow, directed slightly upwards. The tail is long. At hatching, it is 10 cm (3.9 in) long and grows to an adult length of 40–70 cm (16–28 in). The female is longer.

== Scalation ==
F. asperrima has one pair of internasals; the posterior parts are narrow. One loreal, preocular, postocular and three temporals are found. Of the 9 supralabials, 4 and 6 connect with the eye. Ventrals number 131–146, and the undivided subcaudals are 73–93 in count. At midbody there are 19 rows of dorsal scales, which are strongly keeled and rough.

== Colour ==
The dorsal body colour of F. asperrima is olive brown. The anterior half of the body has 20–32 distinct large black spots or cross bars. The posterior body may lack them or may be in light-colored irregular shapes. The head is dark in color. Two black lines run diagonally from behind the eyes to the corners of the mouth. Ventrally, the body is white. F. asperrimus can be easily identified by dark spots or bars on the first half of the body and two dark lines behind the eyes.

== Behaviour ==
F. asperrima is oviparous, diurnal and nocturnal. In dry conditions during the summer, it undergoes aestivation. It is active in water bodies in search of its prey, which consist mainly of fishes and frogs. It is known to be very aggressive. When threatened, it attempts to bite, by flattening its head and neck as does the cobra. The bite may cause wounds. Also, it may release a noxious odor.

== Breeding ==
The gestation period of F. asperrima is 55–67 days. Females do not guard the clutches of eggs, but they stay close to the nest. They lay clutches of four to 30 eggs between September and October.

== Common names ==
- English: Boulenger's keelback or Sri Lankan keelback
- Sinhalese: දිය බරියා/දිය නයා
