= Fowlea schnurrenbergeri =

Species of snake

Fowlea schnurrenbergeri or Xenochrophis schnurrenbergeri (Bar-necked keelback, Kramer's keelback) is a species of Non venomous snake in the family Colubridae. It is found in Nepal, Pakistan, India and Bangladesh.

== Description ==
Fowlea schnurrenbergeri

Conservation status
- Least Concern (IUCN 3.1)

Scientific classification
- Kingdom: Animalia
- Phylum: Chordata
- Class: Reptilia
- Order: Squamata
- Suborder: Serpentes
- Family: Colubridae
- Genus: Fowlea
- Species: F. schnurrenbergeri

Binomial name
- Fowlea schnurrenbergeri (Kramer, 1977)

Bar-necked Keelback is a species which is very close to Checkered Keelback in external morphology. Unlike Checkered Keelback (F. piscator) it is narrowly distributed and found around Himalayan regions also in South Bengal and Odisha. Can be identified by checking 1) Checks on dorsal surface and 2) Cross-bar on neck which is replaced by inverted V in its closest species Checkered Keelback (F. piscator).

Dorsal body-

Body stout with keeled scales on top and smoother on side rows. Dorsal color olive brown with 6 rows of boxes or bars which gradually become faint of posterior body. These bars start from nape in the form of connected or disconnected straight bar.

Ventral body-

Belly usually yellowish-white or white with black edge on the side of each ventral scale. Subcaudal scales paired in a zig-zag manner, their color is similar to ventral scales but sometimes can be darker than ventrals.

Head-

Head triangular with smooth and shiny scales; broader than neck. Color olive brown with two black subocular streaks; anterior below and posterior reaches to last few supralabials. Eyes have rounded pupil.

Tail-

Tail also covered with highly keeled scales. Normal as typical range and ends with pointed tip. Color almost same like rest of the dorsal body but usually without any dark markings.

== Diagnostic Keys ==
Head:

Intranasals distinctly narrowed anteriorly; supralabial 9-10; usually 4th & 5th in contact with eyes; preocular 1; single well defined loreal; postocular 2-3; sometimes a single subocular; temporal 2+2 or 2+3.

Dorsal:

Keeled scales in 19:19:17 rows.

Ventral:

132-139 (Male), 141-152 (Female); anal divided.

Sub Caudal:

71-80 (Male), 61-70 (Female); paired.

Preocular: 1; Postocular: 2-3; Supralabials: 9-10 (4th and 5th touches eye); Infralabials: 8-10; Anterior temporals: 2; Posterior temporals: 2-3; Dorsal scale row formula: 19:19:17. Ventrals: 136-147; Subcaudals: 64-79 (paired). Dorsum olive brown with 5-6 rows of black box like pattern. A straight dark crossbar present on nape. Venter white.

== Habitat ==
Fowlea schnurrenbergeri is much more aquatic in its habit than X. piscator and are found from within or near water hyacinth. The live Fowlea schnurrenbergeri is rather timid. Found in fresh waterbodies of low to moderate elevations of Indian subcontinent. Hides in aquatic vegetation. Xenochrophis schnurrenbergeri mostly found amongst aquatic vegetation.

== Behavior ==
Bar-necked Keelback is a species capable in showing activity anytime. However prone activity is seen during early morning and evening. Its affinity towards aquatic environment is more than X. piscator. Behavior alert, comparatively timid than its sister species Checkered keelback (X. piscatos) and usually try to escape. To show alertness and aggression it inflates much of fore body to show false hood. On threatening always try to escape first by creeping in jumpy manner.

== Distribution ==
Found in patched form in states of Assam, Bihar, Odisha, Uttar Pradesh, West Bengal. Probably found in Sikkim and Uttrakhand also. Outside India it is found in parts of Bangladesh, Southern Pakistan (Vogel & David 2012) and also reported from Northeastern Punjab, Pakistan (Basri et al., 2024) and Nepal.
