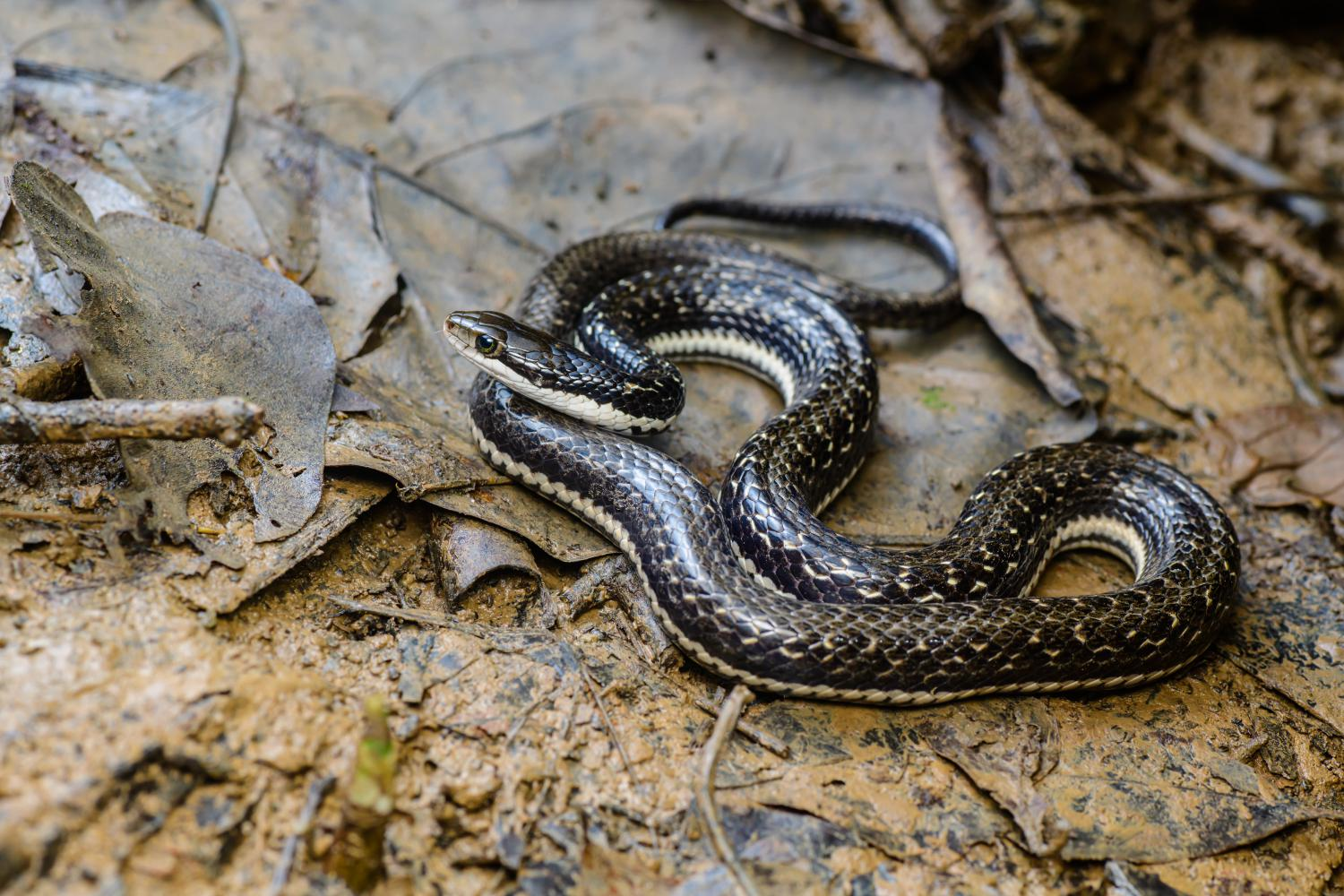

Conservation status
- Least Concern (IUCN 3.1)

Scientific classification
- Kingdom: Animalia
- Phylum: Chordata
- Class: Reptilia
- Order: Squamata
- Suborder: Serpentes
- Family: Colubridae
- Genus: Fowlea
- Species: F. punctulata

Binomial name
- Fowlea punctulata (Günther, 1858)

Synonyms
- Fowlea peguensis Theobald, 1868; Natrix punctulata (Günther, 1858); Nerodia punctulata (Günther, 1858); Tropidonotus punctulatus Günther, 1858; Xenochrophis punctulatus (Günther, 1858)

= Fowlea punctulata =

Species of snake

Fowlea punctulata, commonly known as the spotted keelback water snake, is a species of snake found in East India, Myanmar, and Thailand (Mae Hong Son Province).
