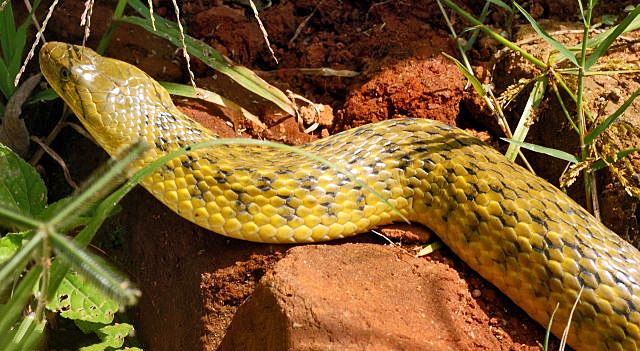
- Checkered keelback (Fowlea piscator)

Scientific classification
- Kingdom: Animalia
- Phylum: Chordata
- Class: Reptilia
- Order: Squamata
- Suborder: Serpentes
- Family: Colubridae
- Subfamily: Natricinae
- Genus: Fowlea; Theobald, 1868

Species
- Nine, see text.

= Fowlea =

Genus of snakes

Fowlea is a genus of snakes in the subfamily Natricinae of the family Colubridae. The genus is endemic to Asia.

== Species ==
The following species are recognized as being valid.

- Fowlea asperrima (Boulenger, 1891) – Boulenger's keelback
- Fowlea flavipunctata (Hallowell, 1860) – yellow-spotted keelback
- Fowlea melanzosta (Gravenhorst, 1807) – Javan keelback water snake
- Fowlea piscator (Schneider, 1799) – checkered keelback
- Fowlea punctulata (Günther, 1858) – Spotted keelback water snake
- Fowlea sanctijohannis (Boulenger, 1890) – St. John's keelback
- Fowlea schnurrenbergeri (Kramer, 1977) – bar-necked keelback
- Fowlea unicolor (F. Müller, 1887) – Tikiri keelback
- Fowlea yunnanensis (Anderson, 1879) – Yunnan olive keelback

Some snakes of this genus, such as Boulenger's keelback and the checkered keelback, were moved from the genus Xenochrophis.

Nota bene: A binomial authority in parentheses indicates that the species was originally described in a genus other than Fowlea.
