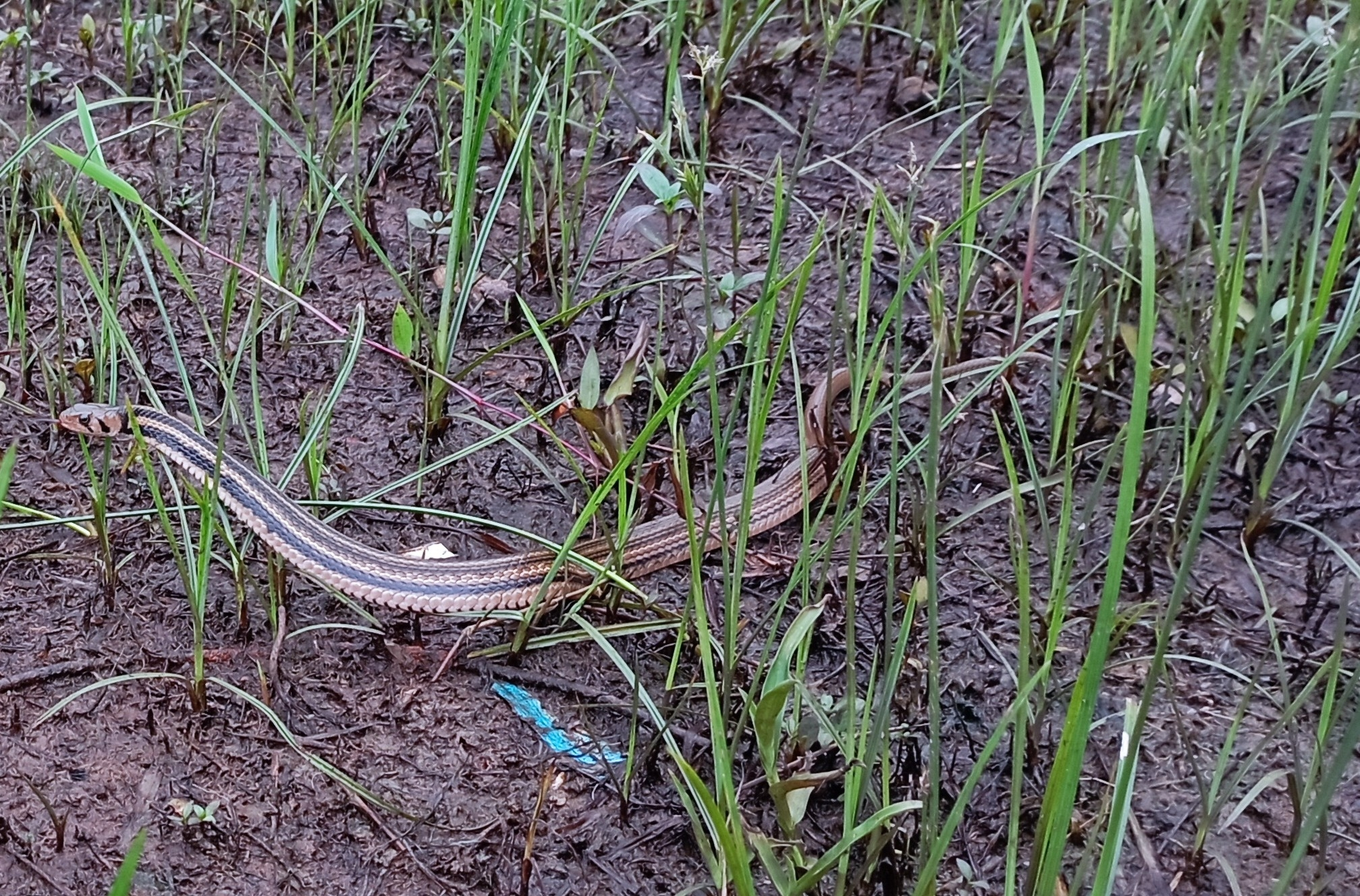

Conservation status
- Least Concern (IUCN 3.1)

Scientific classification
- Kingdom: Animalia
- Phylum: Chordata
- Class: Reptilia
- Order: Squamata
- Suborder: Serpentes
- Family: Colubridae
- Genus: Fowlea
- Species: F. melanzosta

Binomial name
- Fowlea melanzosta (Gravenhorst, 1807)

Synonyms
- Coluber melanzostus Gravenhorst, 1807; Tropidonotus melanzostus — H. Boie, 1826; Coluber lippus Reuss, 1834; Tropidonotus quincunciatus var. melanzostus — L. Müller, 1890; Tropidonotus piscator var. melanzosta — Boettger, 1892; Natrix piscator melanzostus — M.A. Smith, 1943; Xenochrophis piscator melanozostus — Bosch, 1985; Xenochrophis melanozostus — Das, 1996; Xenochrophis flavipunctatus melanozostus — Manthey & Grossmann, 1997; Fowlea melanzostus — Purkayastha et al., 2019; Fowlea melanzosta — Amarasinghe et al., 2022

= Fowlea melanzosta =

Species of snake

Fowlea melanzosta, also commonly known as the Javan keelback water snake and the Javanese keelback water snake, is a species of snake in the family Colubridae. The species is endemic to Indonesia.

== Geographic range ==
F. melanzosta is found in Java and Bali, Indonesia.

== Habitat ==
F. melanzosta is a common species typically encountered in rice paddies, but it also occurs near lakes, rivers, streams, marshes, and in grassland.

== Reproduction ==
F. melanzosta is oviparous.
