= Mayur River =

River in Bangladesh

Coordinates: 22.8137°N 89.5357°E

The Mayur River located in Bangladesh, close to the south and southwestern boundary of the metropolitan area of Khulna, and receives most of the drainage from the city. The river is obstructed by sediment buildup, and its natural tidal flow is prevented by gates. The Mayur is a former distributary of the Ganges.
