= Beel =

Type of flood pond

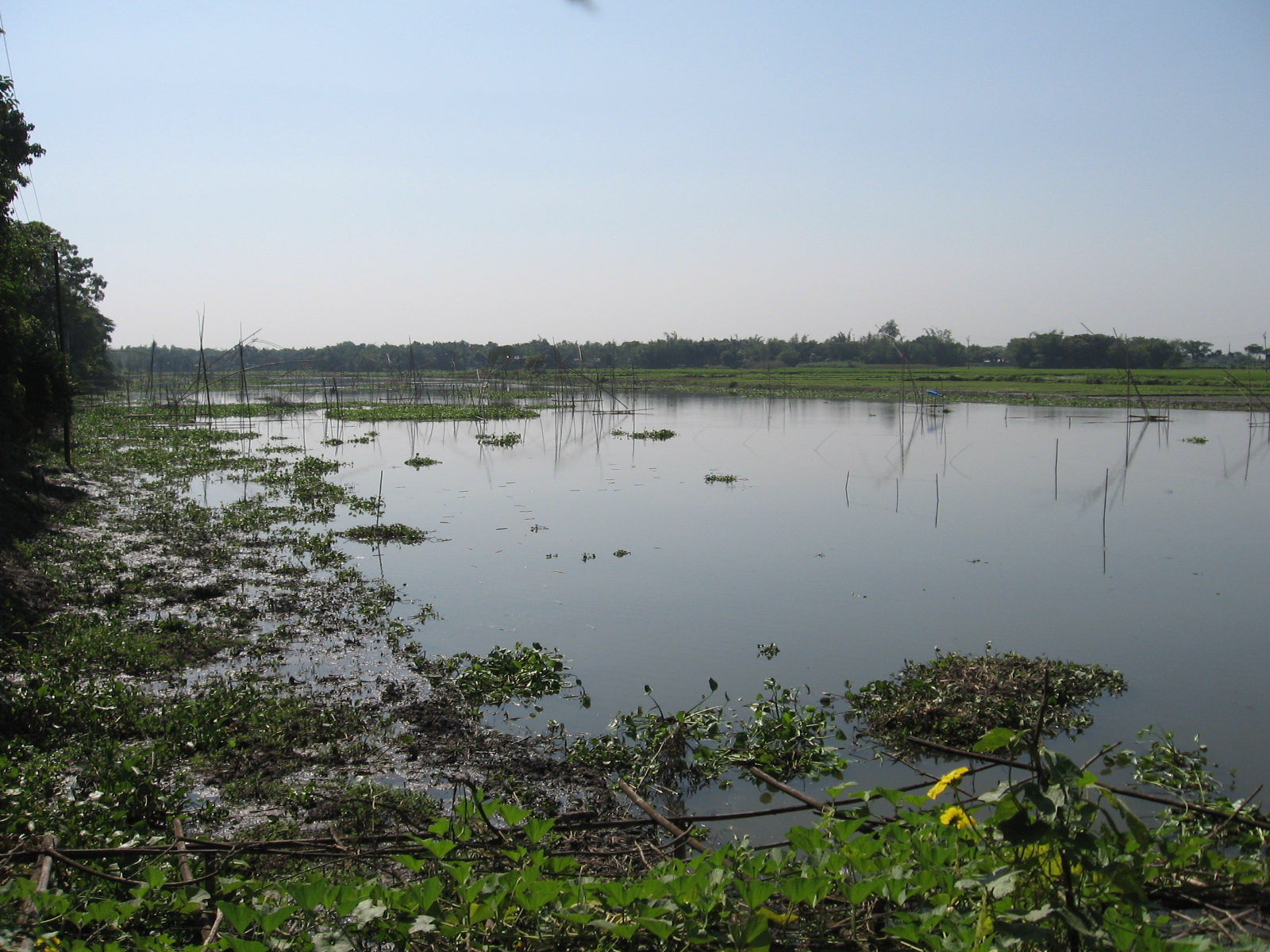
A beel near Aloa village, Tangail District, Bangladesh

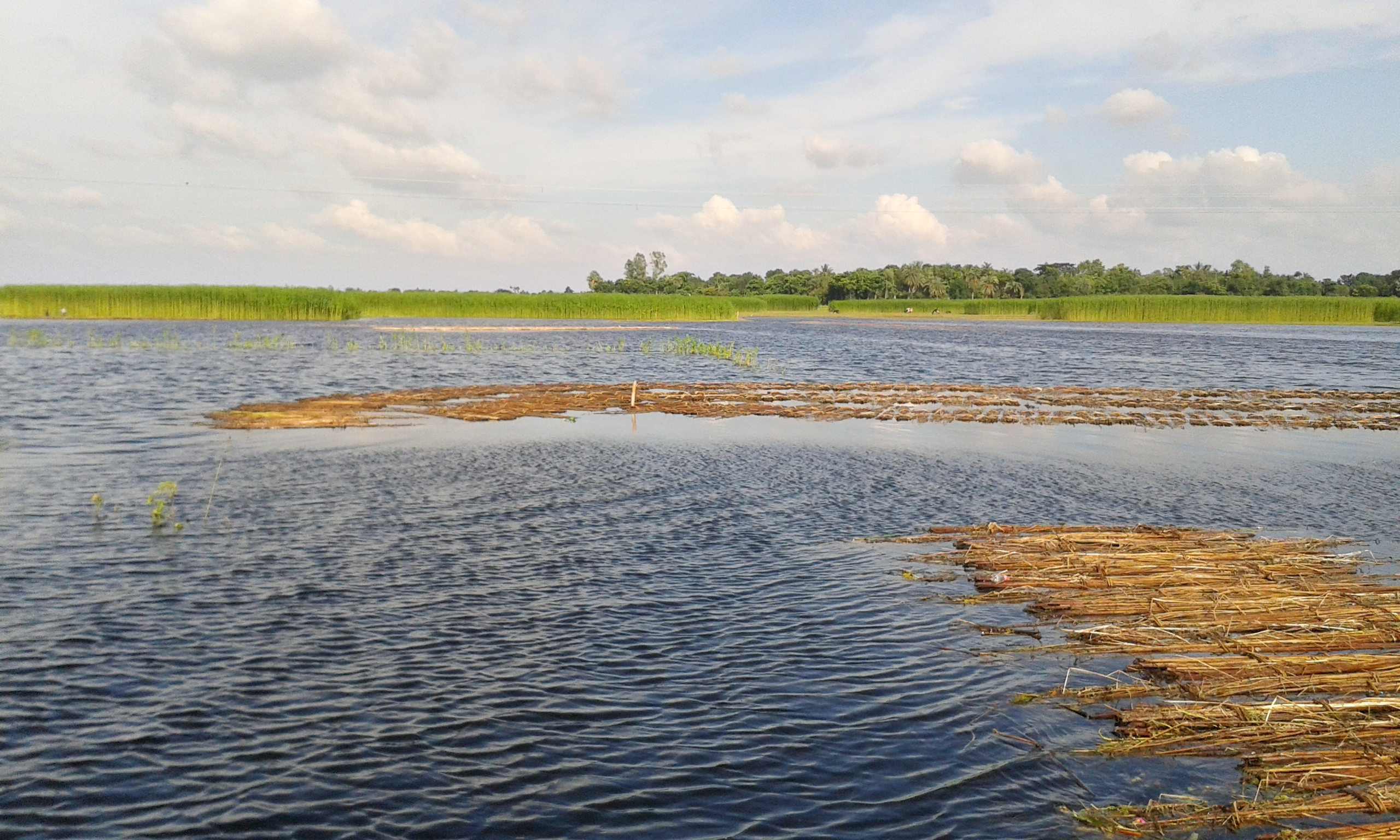
Halti Beel in Natore District

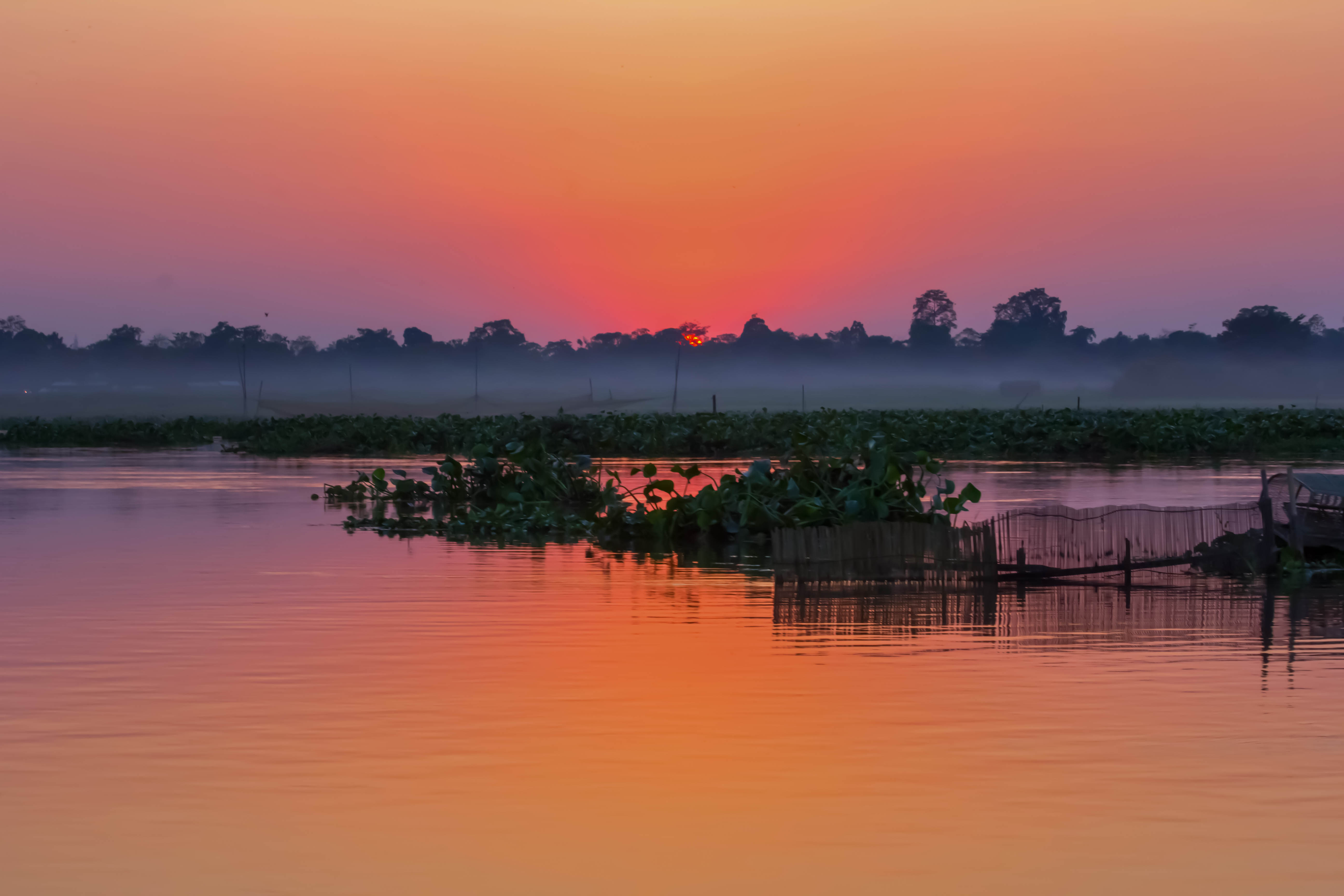
Maguri Motapung Beel in Tinsukia district of Assam

A beel (Bengali and Assamese: বিল) is a lake-like wetland with static water as opposed to moving water in rivers and canals - typically called khāls in Bengali, in the Ganges - Brahmaputra flood plains of Bangladesh, and the Indian states of West Bengal and Assam. The term owes its origins to the word of the same pronunciation meaning "pond" and "lake" in the Bengali and Assamese languages.

== Formation ==
Typically, beels are formed by inundation of low-lying lands during flooding, where some water gets trapped even after flood waters recede back from the flood plains. Beels may also be caused by filling up of low-lying areas during rains, especially during the monsoon season.

There are different causes for the formation of beels. A string of beels is indicative of there being the remains of a great river that deserted its channel, moving to a new one elsewhere.

== Haor, Baor ==
In north eastern Bangladesh there are large water bodies called haors. A haor is a bowl shaped depression which is flooded every year during monsoon. Throughout the rainy season a haor is such a vast stretch of turbulent water that it is thought of as a sea, within which the villages appear as islands. It remains under water for seven months of the year. During the dry season water drains out leaving small shallow lakes exposing rich soil extensively cultivated for rice. In greater Comilla, Faridpur, Dhaka and Pabna districts the beel is sometimes referred to as baor.

== Location of important beels ==
=== Bangladesh ===
Bangladesh has thousands of beels, with the best-known being Chalan Beel, Beel Dakatia, Gopalganj-Khulna Beel, Meda Beel, Aila Beel, Dekhar Beel, Kuri Beel, Erali Beel and Arial Beel. In the central part Bangladesh, important beels are Katla, Chatal, Nagarkanda, and Chanda. Most of the large beels have shrunk a great deal in recent decades. Regionwise, in the northwest of Bangladesh some of the larger beels are Bara Beel in Pirganj, Tagrai Beel in Kurigram, Lunipukur in Rangpur, Bara Mirzapur Beel in Narail and Keshpathar in Bogra. The old river course of Atrai has beels. In the southern region of Bangladesh, important beels are Boyra, Dakatia, Bara, Kola, Patla, Chatal and Srirampur.

=== India ===
==== Assam ====
In Assam, Deepor Beel is a permanent, freshwater lake, in a former channel of the Brahmaputra River, to the south of the main river south-west of Guwahati. It has great biological and environmental importance besides being the only major storm water storage basin for the Guwahati city. The beel is endowed with rich floral and faunal diversity. In addition to huge congregation of residential water birds, the Deepor ecosystem harbours large number of migratory waterfowl each year. Deepor Beel has been designated as a Ramsar site in November 2002.

== Related concepts ==
- Billabong (Australia).
- Polder (Netherlands).
