= Beel Dakatia =

Beel in Bangladesh

- Location within Bangladesh
- Location: Khulna City: Khanjahan Ali, Arangghata, Horintana; Khulna District: Dumuria, Phultala; Jessore District: Abhaynagar, Keshabpur, Monirampur
- Coordinates: 22.91°N 89.45°E
- Primary inflows: Sholmari, Hari, Hamkura, Salta, Bhairab, Bhadra
- Primary outflows: Koiya, Mayur River
- Basin countries: Bangladesh
- Surface area: 30,000 acres (120 km^{2})
- Average depth: 2 m (6.6 ft)
- Settlements: Khulna, Noapara

Beel Dakatia or Dakater Beel is the second largest beel in Bangladesh. It is located in Khulna-Jessore region. In the 1980s, this beel became the curse of the people who lived upon this beel.

== Geography ==
Bil Dakatiya and its adjacent areas are composed of alluvial mud, peat and deltaic sediments. Most of the area here consists of peaty mud, silty peat and peat. In fact, these peaty muds, silty peats and peats are characteristic of slightly elevated areas. Elsewhere there is an abundance of organically rich and fine-textured material. The different geological units of the Bil Dakatiya region are: intertidal zone sediments, Kanda sediments, intertidal plain sediments and co-tidal plain sediments.

It is located between 89°20' east to 48°35' east longitude and 2245 north to 23°00' north latitude on the administrative border of Dumuria and Phultala upazilas of Khulna district. The total area of the polder is about 19,430 ha, of which a maximum of 9,000 ha is naturally underwater (currently 0.5 to 2 m underwater), which is about 50% of the total area.

The climate of the Bill Dakatiya region is characterized by hot summers and mild winters. Additionally, the region is prone to tropical cyclones, tides, inundation, heavy rainfall and salinity. The maximum and minimum temperatures generally fluctuate between 29 °C to 40 °C and 7 °C to 25 °C. The average annual rainfall in this area is 1, 750 mm. The average relative humidity during the dry season is 75%. The region is normally irrigated by Solmari, Hamkura, Hari, Salta, Bhadra and Bhairav rivers.

== Name ==
In Bengali ডাকাত (Dakat) means robber. Legend says robbers robbed the boats when they crosses this beel. That is why the people named it as Beel Dakatia.

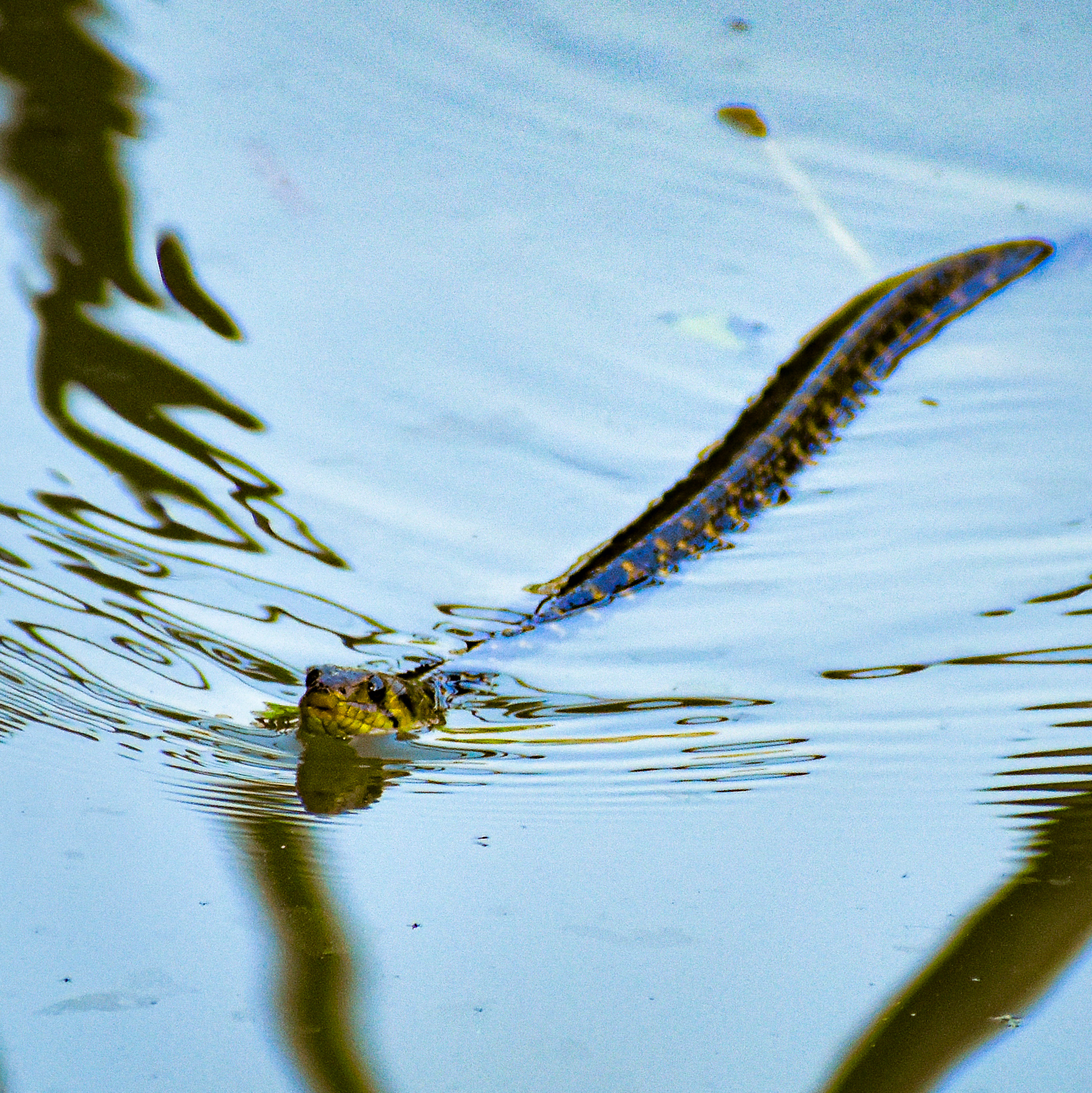
A Checkered keelback (locally known as "Joldhora") spotted swimming at Beel Dakatia
