= Obsession =

Obsession may refer to:

== Psychology ==
- Obsession (psychology), a persistent attachment to an object or idea
- Obsessive–compulsive disorder, a mental disorder triggering obsessive thoughts
- Fixation (psychology), persistence of anachronistic sexual traits
- Idée fixe (psychology), a preoccupation of mind believed to be firmly resistant to any attempt to modify it
- Obsessive love, attempts to possess or control an individual and inability to accept disinterest or rejection
- Celebrity worship syndrome, obsessive addictive disorder to a celebrity's personal and professional life

== Arts, entertainment, and media ==
=== Films ===
- Obsession (1949 film), a British thriller also released as The Hidden Room
- Obsession (1954 film), a French-language crime drama
- Obsession (1976 film), a psychological thriller/mystery directed by Brian De Palma
- Obsession (1997 film), a Franco-German drama starring Daniel Craig
- Obsession (2008 film), a Russian film starring Denis Matrosov
- Obsession (2011 film), by Cameroonian director Achille Brice
- Obsession (2015 film), the American title of Dutch film Rendez-Vous starring Loes Haverkort
- Obsession (2022 film), a Nigerian drama
- Obsession (2025 film), an American horror film
- Obsess (2026 film), an Indian thriller
- Ossessione ("Obsession"), a 1943 Italian crime drama
- Junoon (1978 film) ("The Obsession"), a 1979 Indian drama by Shyam Benegal
- Circle of Two, 1981 Canadian drama also distributed as Obsession
- Obsession: Radical Islam's War Against the West, 2005 documentary

=== Games ===
- Obsession (video game), a pinball game for the Atari STe and Amiga computers

=== Literature ===
- Obsession (book), 1998 nonfiction book by John E. Douglas and Mark Olshaker
- Obsession (novel), 2007 Alex Delaware novel by Jonathan Kellerman
- Obsession (novella), 1992, by Filipino writer, F. Sionil José
- Obsession, 2009 novel by Gloria Vanderbilt
- Obsession, 1962 novel by Lionel White

=== Music ===
==== Performers ====
- Obsesión (Cuban band), Cuban hip-hop duo
- Obsession (band), a metal band

==== Albums ====
- Obsession (Lionel Loueke album), with Céline Rudolph, 2017
- Obsession (Atomic Forest album), 2011
- Obsession (Blue System album), 1990
- Obsession (Bob James album), 1986
- Obsession (Boyfriend EP), 2014
- Obsession (Dive EP), 1995
- Obsession (Eighteen Visions album), 2004
- Obsession (Exo album), 2019
- Obsession (Rachelle Ann Go album), 2007
- Obsession (Shayne Ward album), 2010
- Obsession (UFO album), 1978
- Obsession (Wallace Roney album), 1991
- Obsesiones, 1992, by Mexican singer Yuri
- Obsession, 1994, by Éric Lapointe

==== Songs ====
- "Obsesión" (Aventura song), 2002, by Aventura
- "Obsession (I Love You)", 2003, by Amiel Daemion on the album Audio Out
- "Obsession" (Michael Des Barres & Holly Knight song), 1983 covered by Animotion, 1984
- "Obsession" (Army of Lovers song), 1991
- "Obsession" (Exo song), 2019
- "Obsession" (Nudimension song), 1984
- "Obsession" (Shayne Ward song), 2011
- "Obsession" (Sky Ferreira song), 2010
- "Obsession" (Tich song), 2013
- "Obsession" (Tiësto song), 2002
- "Obsessions", by Suede, 2002
- "Obsessions" (Marina and the Diamonds song), 2009
- "Obsession", by Delirious? on the album Cutting Edge Fore
- "Obsession", by G-Dragon on GD & TOP
- "Obsession", by Kylie Minogue from Body Language
- "Obsession", by OK Go on Hungry Ghosts
- "Obsession", by Scorpions on Eye II Eye
- "Obsession", by See-Saw, the opening theme of the series .hack//Sign
- "Obsession", by Shinee on Lucifer
- "Obsession", by Siouxsie & The Banshees on A Kiss in the Dreamhouse
- "Obsession", by Sukha and Tegi Pannu, 2023
- "Obsession", by Cabaret Voltaire on The Voice of America
- "Obsession", by Xymox
- "Obsession", by Minnie on the extended play Her, 2025
- "Obsession", by James Blake on Trying Times

=== Television ===
==== Episodes ====
- "Obsession" (CSI: NY), 2007
- "Obsession" (NCIS), 2010
- "Obsession" (Sliders), 1996
- "Obsession" (Smallville), 2004
- "Obsession" (Star Trek: The Original Series), 1967
- "Obsession" (Superman: The Animated Series), 1998
- "Obsession" (Third Watch), 2004
- "Obsession" (X-Men: The Animated Series), 1994

==== Series ====
- Obsession (2014 TV series), a 2014 Filipino medical drama
- Obsession (2023 TV series), based on the novel Damage by Josephine Hart

=== Internet ===
- "Obsession: The Sugar-Coated Trap", a 2026 Hong Kong anti-drug video

== Other uses ==
- Obsession (perfume) by Calvin Klein
- Obsession (Spiritism), interference of a subjugating spirit with a weaker spirit in Spiritism
- Obsession Telescopes, an American telescope manufacturer

== See also ==
- Fixation (disambiguation)
- Obsessed (disambiguation)
- Obsesión (disambiguation)
