= Women in Cuba =

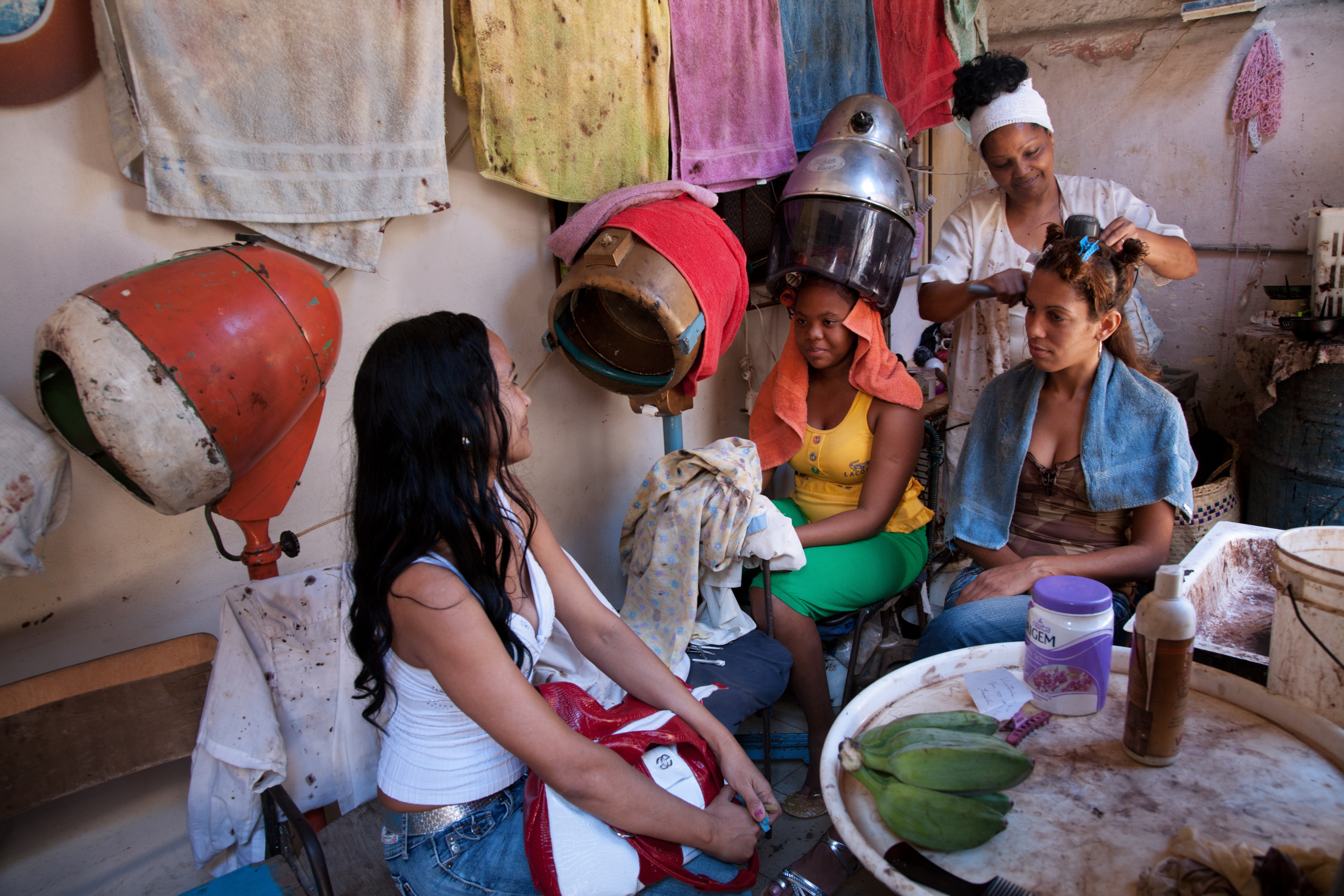
- Women at a beauty salon in Havana

General statistics
- Maternal mortality (per 100,000): 39 (2015)
- Women in parliament: 55.7% (2023)
- Women over 25 with secondary education: 83.9% (2005-2015)
- Women in labour force: 42.6% (2015)

Gender Inequality Index
- Value: 0.296 (2023)
- Rank: 75th out of 172

Global Gender Gap Index
- Value: 0.746 (2021)
- Rank: 39th out of 156

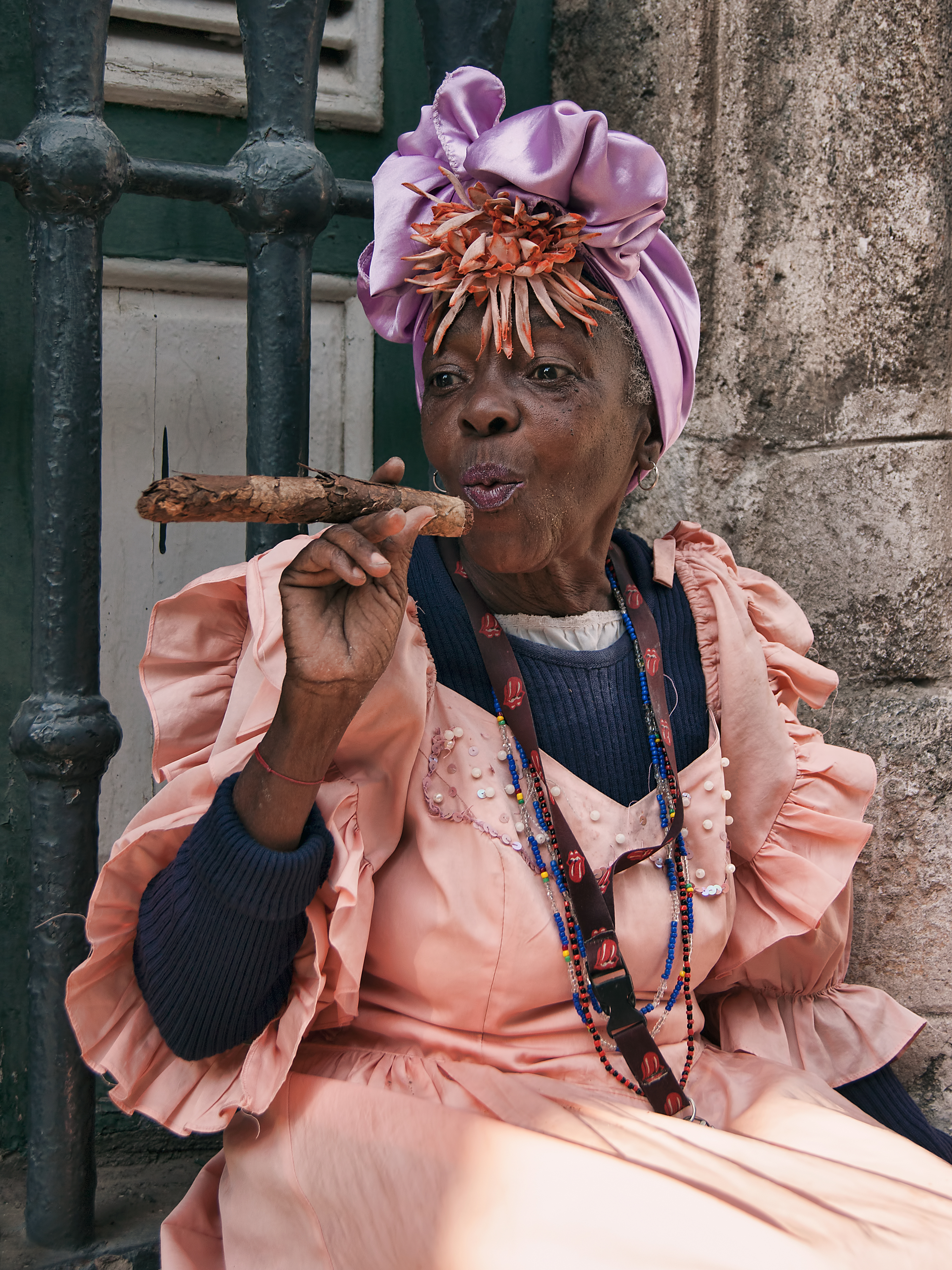
An older Cuban woman in colourful traditional costume poses playfully with her cigar outside the Plaza de Armas

Women in Cuba have the same constitutional rights as men in the economic, political, cultural, and social fields, as well as in the family. Cuba is regarded as a regional front-runner in women's rights. According to Article 44 of the Cuban Constitution, "The state guarantees women the same opportunities and possibilities as men in order to achieve woman's full participation in the development of the country." As of 2023, women hold 55.7% of the parliamentary seats in the Cuban National Assembly.

Many women in Cuba come from different racial backgrounds, including Afro-Cuban women. Along with Afro-Cuban women, women in Cuba, formerly a marginalized group, were able to gain higher educational levels and equal advancements in their respective careers. The 1975 Family Code was designed to allow Cuban women to share the household duties fairly with their spouses. Job opportunities were available in the cities, and, as a result, many Cuban women left the countryside to work, and live, in the cities. However, because of the increased number of Cuban women studying and working, the national birth rate has declined. Despite the fact that desegregation was enforced in Cuba, there are still some issues in regards to fair housing in Cuba.

== History ==
In the first half of the 20th century, women in Cuba had achieved a status comparable with that of other Latin American countries, such as Argentina and Chile. The goal of Cuban feminists during this time was based on Cuban culture as well as the class position of the women who led the feminist movement. In 1923, the first National Women's Congress was held in Havana. Thirty-one different women's organizations participated in the Congress. Three years later in 1925, a second National Women's Congress was held and this time seventy women's organizations participated. During this time, one of the most prominent leaders among the feminist movement was Ofelia Domínguez Navarro, who also participated in both National Women's Congresses. In 1934, during the 100-day government of Ramón Grau, Cuban women received the vote. In 1934 the percentages of Cuban women working outside the home, attending school, and practicing birth control surpassed the corresponding percentages in nearly every other Latin American country.

Women in Cuba had been elected to Cuba's House of Representatives and Senate, serving as mayors, judges, cabinet members, municipal counselors, and members of the Cuban foreign service. The return of Grau to government, under the auspices of President Fulgencio Batista provided for the Cuban Constitution of 1940, one of the most progressive in the Western Hemisphere with regard to women's status, prohibiting discrimination on the basis of sex and calling for equal pay for equal work. While these progressive laws were a step in the right direction, many of them were not enforced.

During the Cuban Revolution, women were mobilized and obtained unparalleled rights compared to the rest of Latin America. For example, they were able to obtain the 1975 Cuban Family Code. This code outlawed discrimination against women and girls, even within the family. The 1975 Family Code stated that both husband and wife share an equal amount of responsibilities in the household. According to the Federation of Cuban women, the Family Code is an educational example for young generations. By seeing the Family Code as an example for families, young people could note that both husband and wife are required to share household duties.

After the Cuban Revolution of 1959, the Federation of Cuban Women (FMC) was established as an NGO. The Federation of Cuban Women allowed for the Cuban government to closely monitor women's progress and ensure oversight. This helped women to achieve "impressive parity in university education, pay scales, and local government positions." The FMC was recognized by the Cuban government as "the national mechanism for the advancement of women in Cuba". The organization claims to have more than 3 million members, which constitutes 85.2% of all women over age 14. There is also a Women's Training Center and a Women's Publishing House at the national level. The group generally adheres to the Cuban government's objectives "to defend the Cuban Revolution".

Since the "Special Period in the Times of Peace" in the 1990s, women have stepped to the forefront of life in Cuba, calling for a step towards an existence without sexism. Sexism in Cuba goes hand in hand with the racism experienced by Afro-Cubans. Black women receive the lowest paying jobs and have the highest rates of unemployment and the lowest education levels. They often live with the threat of gender violence.

Even though Cuban women achieved a lot of parity during the Cuban Revolution, there was still a lot of disparity prevalent in Cuban society.

Some examples are:

- "During the 1990s, when subsidies from the Soviet Union ended, the maintenance of social services often fell back on women as mothers, wives, and caregivers, indicative that Cuba had not fully equalized gender responsibilities."
- Women only held one-quarter of high-level administrative positions in government.
- "This persistence of women's inequality in the political arena was apparent in the speculation over who was to succeed Fidel Castro as head of state, when he became ill in 2006. Of the 12-15 names mentioned, which included the inner circles of Cuba's leadership, not one was a woman."

A referendum on the matter of modifying the Family Code was held in Cuba on 25 September 2022. It succeeded, and among other things the new Family Code includes strict equality of rights between men and women. Even before the passage of the Family Code, Cuba was already a regional front-runner in women's rights according to Reuters.

== Hip-hop ==
Hip hop, more specifically rap, has become the vehicle for Cuban women to express their dissatisfaction with race and gender status in Cuba. The lyrics of all female Cuban rap groups Krudas Cubensi and Obsession ask for respect for diversity on the music scene and sympathy for women who have turned to prostitution in Cuba for economic rescue. During the "Special Period", women came to the forefront in managing different economic and domestic situations and in doing so, assumed more responsibility and new authority. The popular dance style "perreo" can be seen as a symbol of this change, with women in front of men during the dance.

Promotion of female hip-hop artists is currently not on the same level as their male counterparts. However, through the support of the Cuban Rap Agency and specifically Magia López, the head of the agency, this may change. López is currently working to increase the participation of women in the Cuban hip-hop scene.

== Reproductive health ==
In modern Cuba, women have free access to abortion and up to two years maternity leave.

Before the success of the Cuban Revolution in 1959, abortion in Cuba was illegal and contraceptives inaccessible. Reproductive health laws were patterned after the 1870 Penal Code in Spain, making abortion highly restrictive. In 1936, some of the more restrictive laws were rewritten and put into the new penal code, called the Social Defense Code.

After the creation of the FMC in 1960, efforts were made to increase the reproductive rights of women in Cuba. In 1965, abortion was decriminalized and in 1979, abortion was made free and more easily accessible. The United Nations Population Policy data bank states that between 1968 and 1974, the rate of legal abortion went from 16.5 to 69.5 legal abortions performed per 1,000 women of reproductive age. Currently, the estimate is around 47 and 62 legal abortions per 1,000 women of reproductive age.

The reason there is such a focus on abortion when discussing reproductive rights in Cuba is because it is very commonly used for family planning. However, other contraceptives are available for free through the Cuban healthcare system and are used. According to statistics gathered from UNICEF and the United Nations Population Division, it is estimated that contraceptive prevalence of any method (methods defined as modern methods of contraceptives, including female and male sterilization, oral hormonal pills, the intrauterine device (IUD), the male condom, injectables, implantable devices, vaginal barrier methods, the female condom and emergency contraception and not including abortion) was 73.7 percent of women in Cuba ages 15–49. The peak percentage was 77.8 in 2010 and lowest 60 percent in 1980.

== Home, family, and birth rate ==
Women head nearly 50% of Cuban households.

One of the areas where women in Cuba continue to face inequality is within their own homes. Despite many women with children having advanced collegiate degrees and jobs in the professional workforce, they also have the responsibility to care for their children, husbands, and do most, if not all, of the cooking and cleaning for the household. Unequal distribution of household work can be at least partially attributed to the concept of Machismo often found in Latin American countries. In terms of relationships, women in Cuba were expected to have a fulfilling and satisfactory relationship with their husbands. By having a pleasing relationship with their husbands, the Cuban government theorized that the couples' loving relationship will influence their children to behave morally and civilly. The rigid gender norms result in women cutting down work hours and receiving even less pay than they already are in order to make the time to care for their homes and families.

After the Cuban Revolution, more and more Cuban women started working away from home. The revolutionary government worked to change the societal norms marginalizing women in Cuba. Emancipation was necessary to help women gain equal economic opportunities. Prior to the Cuban Revolution, according to a census taken in 1953, 13.7% of Cuban women were working. After 1960, the number of women working increased. With revolutionary reforms that were implemented, Cuban women have more economic opportunities. A steady income would serve as an incentive for both men and women to migrate to the cities. However, with more women working and going to school, the birth rate has decreased. Another result is that there were fewer people living and working in the countryside due to the fact that they emigrated to the cities for jobs.

One consequence of the disproportionate household work burden is that many women are choosing to utilize Cuba's aforementioned accessible abortions and contraceptives to delay, if not completely prevent, having any children. Cuba's birth rate has been decreasing in recent years. In 2016, it was estimated that the country's population growth rate was at 0.13% and it is believed it will continue to slow to a negative population growth within the next few years if current trends continue. Comparatively, the United States population growth rate was at 0.7% in 2016, in Canada 1.2% in 2016, and in Mexico a 1.3% growth rate in 2016. The world population growth rate in 2016 was about 1.1%.

In the housing industry in Cuba, there were inequalities in the housing sector. Despite the Revolution's promise to implement equal distribution and fair housing, the revenues sent from abroad were able to sustain the Caucasian Cubans' living expenses. Afro-Cuban men and women were not able to live in luxurious homes due to a finding that the majority of expensive homes were owned by Caucasian Cubans sustained by revenues sent from family members living abroad. Despite the high number of Caucasian owners in expensive neighborhoods, the Revolution has implemented desegregation in schools and in neighborhoods.

== Education ==
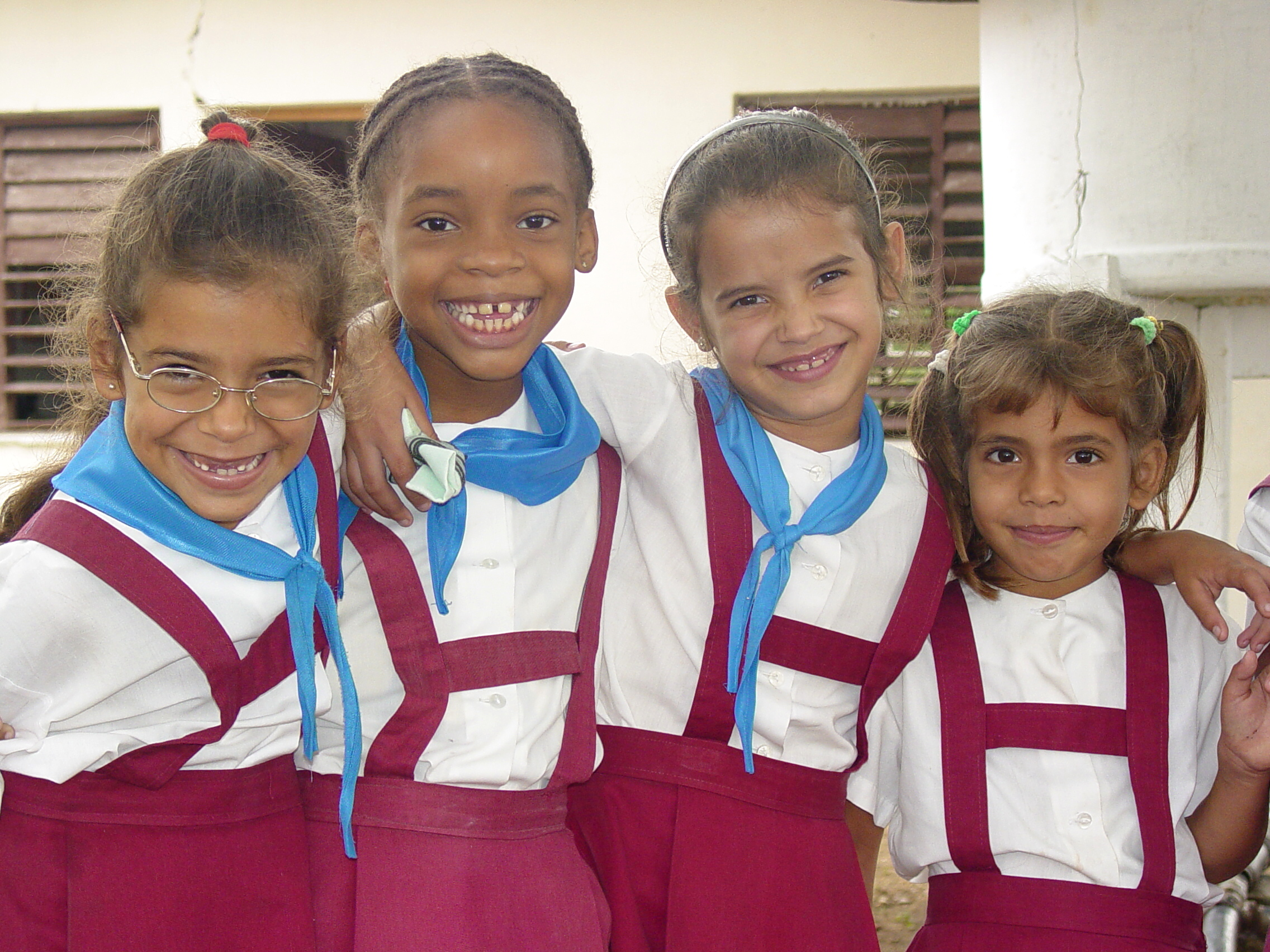
Girls in school uniform, near Pinar del Río, Cuba. 2006.

Historically, Cuba was a largely agrarian society, with a tourism-based economy in the urban areas, primarily Havana. Many women were forced to work as maids or prostitutes in these areas because there were not many other choices for them, as they were excluded from educational opportunities. Before the revolution, around 70% of women in the workforce were domestic servants, working for long hours with low pay, and little to no benefits. Only around 194,000 women were in the workforce, with around 700,000 considered unemployed and 300,000 under-employed.

After the revolution, the FMC fought to establish equal educational rights for women. The organization met with other Latin American countries to share ideas for positive increases in women's education. The FMC started by establishing schools specifically for women who were domestic servants and prostitutes, and schools for women living in poverty. These schools were designed to help women develop a broader range of skills, ultimately helping them to gain the ability to obtain higher education. These schools also set out to help with the country's history of rates of illiteracy. About a quarter of the population of Cuba was illiterate when Fidel Castro took power, and over half were women. By 1961, nearly the entire country was literate, primarily in thanks to volunteers (of which around 56% were young women) going to rural areas to teach literacy.

As of 2011, women in Cuba made up more than 80% of university students, and around 68% of university graduates. Comparatively, women made up about 57% of under-graduates in the United States in 2008. Women in Cuba also make up about 81% of medical students, but are under-represented in math and science fields, representing only 46% of natural science and math students, 37% of technical studies students, and 30% of engineering students.

== Women in the Cuban labor force ==
Nearly 60% of professionals in modern Cuba are women.

Across the world, people are concerned about the feminization of poverty. Seven out of every ten poor people are women or girls, according to a study carried out by the World Food Programme (WFP). In Cuba, we are seeing something unique in this area. While the average Cuban wage was around 494.4 regular pesos per month ($18.66) at the end of 2008 to 2015, an increase in the number of women in the technical and professional work force in Cuba has been seen. According to the World Bank's Gender Data Portal, women represent 42% of the labor force participation rate in Cuba. Research conducted by the American Association of University Women (AAUW) showed that, in 2011, women represented around 70% of the professional workforce, 69% of health care workers, and 80% of educational workers, but only around 30% of engineers, showing that the rates decrease in the scientific and technical sector.

Before the Revolution there were little to no women in the workforce, let alone getting paid for the employment. Only 14.2 percent of the female population were in paid employment, according to a journal article, Socialism and Feminism: Women and the Cuban Revolution, Part 1. Most women in this time were expected to be housewives and attend to their husbands and families. Although, there was a small percentage of women that were seeking to work. According to the journal article, Socialism and Feminism: Women and the Cuban Revolution, Part 1, in 1958 there was a percentage of 19.3 women looking for jobs. Since then, compared to the statistics now you can see an increase in women in the work force. But you still see the difference between the men and women that are employed between the where they work and how much they're getting paid. Therefore, there has been slight changes but there is still a lot more improvement and change to be done for the women of Cuba and receive the rights they deserve.

== History of Afro-Cuban women ==
Afro-Cuban women have been living in Cuba starting in the fifteenth century with the rise of the demand for slaves during colonial times. Slaves born in Africa and were imported to Cuba were termed bozal. Slaves born in Cuba were known as negro criollo. The Afro-Cuban culture was also amalgamated with the influx of Afro-Haitians and their cultural products and practices in the aftermath of the Haitian Revolution.

After 1959, the revolutionary government instituted new reforms for the Afro-Cubans and the overall population. The revolutionary government had a goal to make every sector of the population become literate. The result was that many Afro-Cubans graduated from high school which is statistically higher compared to their white counterparts. This change would result in noting a substantial number of Afro-Cubans enrolling in medical schools. They were trained in medical schools established in Cuba. Medical schools were established since there was a "brain drain" that occurred likely due to the increasing attractiveness of the revolutionary ideals in the country. Thereof, one of the changes include free medical care which was provided to the Cuban population as well as to foreign patients. Cuba was renowned for its humanitarian cause in other countries including Venezuela. Afro-Cuban women were the majority of doctors sent abroad. One of the reasons why many Afro-Cuban women make up the majority of doctors sent abroad is because the salary is lucrative. Many Afro-Cubans did not have families living abroad and so they were not able to receive currency nor gifts. The Cuban government did not charge tuition to students and Afro-Cuban women and Cuban women were able to study in medical schools. They gained the opportunity to be high-paying doctors and this is a major gain in women's rights in Cuba. By receiving steady money and material commodities such as clothing, the Afro-Cuban doctors were able to support their families in Cuba. In addition, they would not have an obligation to immigrate to a new country. They could work in a foreign country for a relatively short period of time then return home to Cuba.

During the Special Period, Afro-Cubans were severely affected by the numerous problems that arose. For instance, they had to endure hardships including low supply of food and insufficient job opportunities. Afro-Cuban women asserted that they did not receive the professional opportunity to contribute to the Cuban economy despite their high educational level. For instance, in the 1990s, Afro-Cuban women have raised the issue of lack of jobs in the tourist sector. Because of the hardships, insufficient food supply, and insufficient hospitality jobs, many women including Afro-Cubans turned to sex work and international dating (tourism). In the sex tourism industry, Afro-Cuban female sex workers became publicly associated as some distinct and vixenish type of exotic objects. Conversely, Caucasian-Cuban sex workers were commonly assumed to be girlfriends or wives for tourists.

== Prominent women in Cuba after the revolution ==
The most prominent woman in the Cuban government after the revolution was Vilma Espín. Vilma Espín was the wife of Raúl Castro. She was the founder of the Federation of Cuban Women, a member of the Central Committee of the Communist Party and the party's Political Bureau. She had a chemical engineering degree from the Massachusetts Institute of Technology. She was a leader in the guerrilla movement during the revolution and was extremely close with Fidel and Raúl Castro.

On the other side, a prominent figure was opposition leader Laura Inés Pollán Toledo. Pollán founded the dissident group Ladies in White, which holds pacifist protest marches with the wives and spouses of political prisoners in Cuba to demand their release. Pollan worked as a literature teacher until her retirement in 2004. She always wore white, a symbol of the organization, and became a key opposition figure in Cuba.

After the Revolution, many Afro-Cuban women, with financial support from the Cuban government, have graduated from medical schools and were sent abroad to help patients.

== See also ==
- Women in the Americas
