= Cuban Rap Agency =

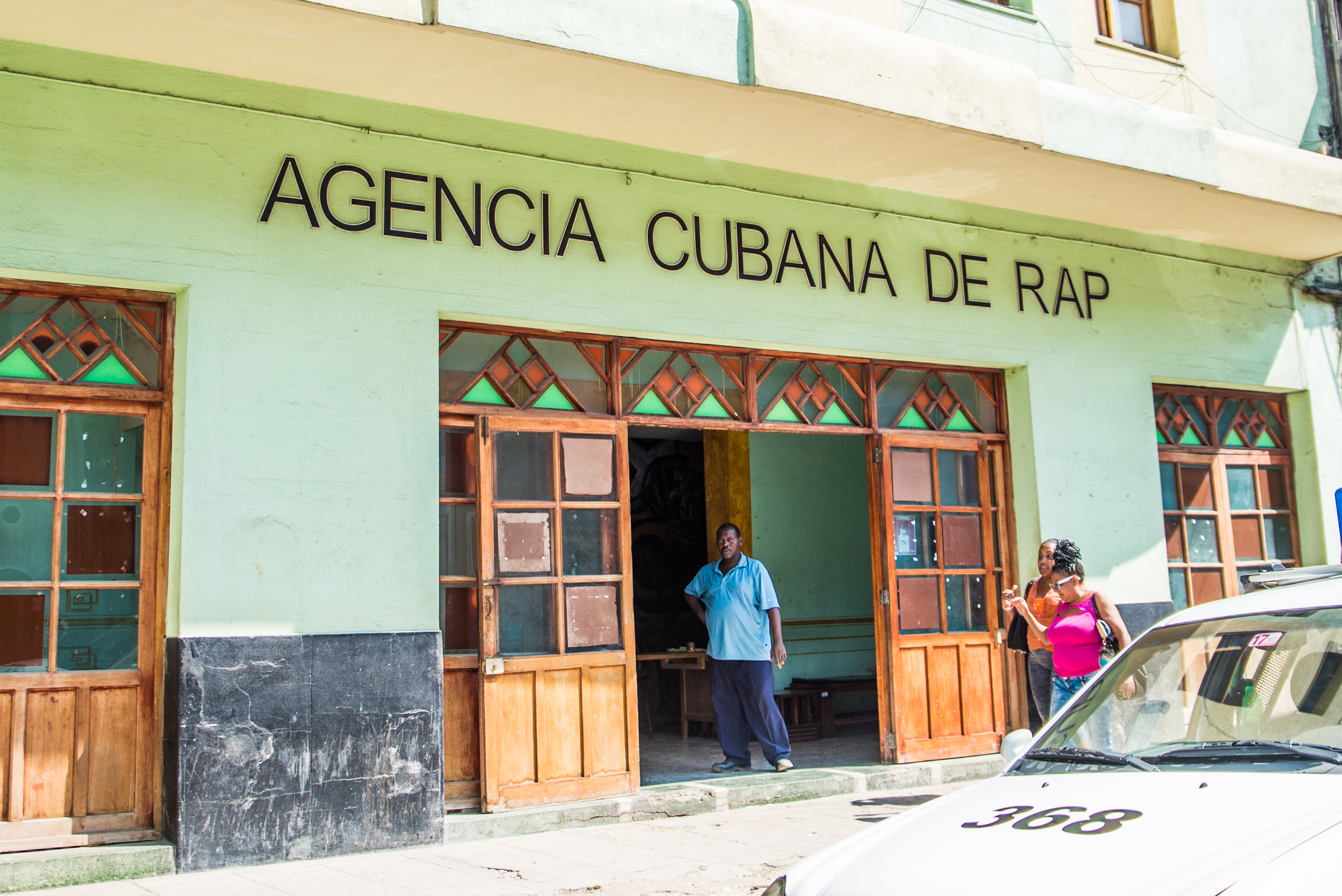
Photo of the exterior of the Cuban Rap Agency building in Havana, Cuba. Captured on September 21, 2017.

The Cuban Rap Agency (Agencia Cubana de Rap) is an industry subsidized by the Cuban government aimed at aiding Cuban hip hop artists in attaining radio exposure and recording contracts. Founded in 2002, the Cuban Rap Agency seeks out talented Cuban hip hop artists in order to promote hip-hop in Cuba.

The CRA provides a state-run record label named La Fabri-k to help promote hip-hop on the island. The two main groups that make up the La Fabri-k label are Obsesion and Doble Filo. An important part of their style is live musicianship, underlining a mixture of traditional percussion, guitar, violin, cello, saxophone and piano all layered under rhyme.

The CRA is an example of the growing nationalization of rap and music in general in Cuba. Indeed, in 1999, Abel Prieto, the minister of Culture, declared rap to be " an authentic expression of Cuban culture".

Skeptics charge the organization with the marginalization of hip-hop in Cuba. Intrinsic to the Cuban Rap Agency's mission of increasing exposure of Cuban hip-hop is an emphasis on the commercialization of the music. This in addition to the growing materialism in Cuba has put pressure on artists signed by the agency to adopt a more commercially viable sound such as reggaeton. According to journalist Jessica Thurston of The Tartan, the Cuban Rap Agency leads hip-hop artists to "abandon their ideals and minimize the ability of any group to cause change." The agency's growing number of reggaeton artists and decreasing number of hip-hop artists causes concern with the shift in messages that these two genres of music represent. Hip-hop in Cuba was embraced so quickly because contained a revolutionary social message which to many resonates with the Cuban revolution. On the other hand, Thurston characterizes reggaeton as the genre that "celebrates the trivial lifestyle of bars, dancing, and objectifying women". Many view the Cuban Rap Agency as a threat to the future of underground hip-hop in Cuba.

The Cuban Rap Agency rejects these accusations, claiming that the CRA is beneficial for the hip-hop community in Cuba. CRA director Susan Garcia Amorós asserts that the rappers endorsed by the organization "have rapped their own way." Journalist Antonio Paneque Brizuela of La Revista Cubana de Hip Hop interprets this quotation to mean that CRA artists have impacted the development of other musical styles.

Upon its initiation, the CRA consisted of three major rap groups: Cubanitos 2002, Alto Voltaje and Cubanos en la Red. The number of recording artists that existed beneath the CRA's jurisdiction fluctuated until 2004. At that point, many "rap" and "hip-hop" artists had withdrawn from the organization, providing for an unprecedented distribution of reggaeton. A rift gradually formed between the CRA and the more hip-hop centered Asociación Hermanos Saíz. The AHS, however, is not a government-endorsed institution, and instead a function of the Union of Young Communists. The AHS maintains a similar critique to that of Jessica Thurston, openly criticizing the genre at the 8th Congress of the Union of Young Communists in 2005.
