= Obsesión =

Obsesión (Spanish "obsession") or plural Obsesiones, may refer to:

== Film and TV ==
- Obsesión (TV series), 1967 telenovela
- Obsesión (es), 1996 TV series featuring Santiago Magill
- Obsesión (es), 2005 TV series featuring Mario Casas
- Obsesión, 2004 short film nominated at Spain's 14th Goya Awards

== Music ==
- Obsesión, Monterrey band with which Myriam Montemayor Cruz sung
- Obsesión (Cuban band) hip hop duo
- Obsesión, 2004 classical composition by Jesús Rueda

=== Albums ===
- Obsesión, a 1969 album by Los Freddy's
- Obsesión (Sangre Azul album), 1987, or the title track
- Obsesión (Miguel Mateos album), 1990, or the title track
- Obsesión (Daniela Castillo album) 2006, or the title track
- Obsesión, 2000 album by Los Palominos, or the title track
- Obsesiones, 1992 album by Yuri

=== Songs ===
- "Obsesión" (Pedro Flores song) 1935, covered by Los Freddys, Spanish Harlem Orchestra, Julio Iglesias, and others
- "Obsesión" (Aventura song) 2003, covered by Freddy J, Lucenzo (Tropical Family)
- "Obsesión" (Lali song), 2023
- "Obsesión", song by Delirious? from Libertad, 2002
- "Obsesión", song by Ana Gabriel from Soy como soy, 1998
- "Obsesión", song by Magneto from Siempre, 1996
- "Obsesión", song by Maluma from Maluma, 2012
- "Obsesión", song from Lorena Herrera album Sobrevivire, 2003

== See also ==
- Obsession (disambiguation)
