= TalentoCubano.net =

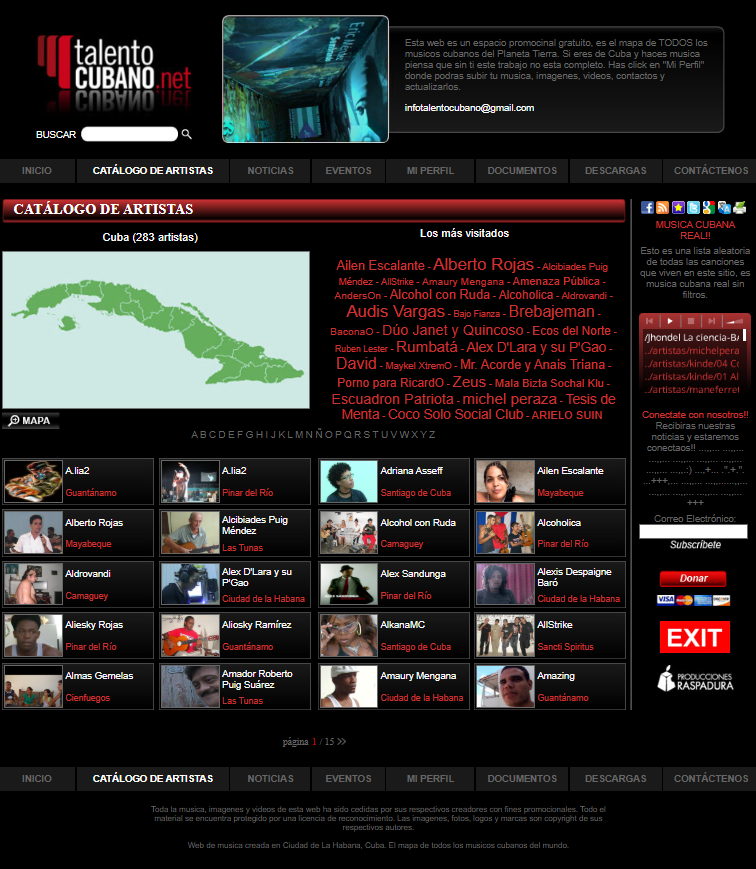
Archived screenshot of TalentoCubano.Net's artist catalog, February 2014.

TalentoCubano.Net is a Cuban cultural website created by Adrian Monzon to document and promote Cuban musicians. The project was launched at Mediamatic Bank in Amsterdam in March 2010. In 2014, it was included in an Associated Press investigation into a USAID-funded program involving Cuba's underground music scene.

== History ==
Mediamatic described TalentoCubano.Net as a web database intended to promote Cuban underground musicians internationally. Before the launch, a team of producers and artists traveled to each province of Cuba, documenting musicians from different styles. An archived February 2014 version of the website displayed a catalog of 283 artists.

In a 2012 interview with Havana Times, Adolfo Cabrera said that the concept originated with Adrian Monzon. He connected the project with concerts and promotional activities involving artists, including Los Aldeanos, Anónimo Consejo, and Etian.

As of July 2026, the official TalentoCubano.Net website described the project as a "living archive" and an atlas of Cuban art around the world.

== 2014 Associated Press reporting and response ==
In December 2014, the Associated Press reported that Monzon worked with Creative Associates on a project that its longer English and Spanish reports identified as TalentoCubano.org. A separate AP explainer identified the network as Talentocubano.net, described it as connecting approximately 200 young people, and reported that contractors hoped it could encourage a social movement.

The Associated Press also reported that contractors underwrote an arts and music festival organized by Pablo Milanes' family so TalentoCubano.Net artists could appear. Suylén Milanés told AP that officials warned her before the event.

In response to the AP article, Monzon told the Miami Herald that TalentoCubano.net was his own initiative and denied participating in a USAID project intended to overthrow the Cuban government. He described the project as a map and open network intended to help Cuban musicians connect and distribute their work.

In 2018, VICE en Español revisited the controversy, described the website as having been created by Monzon in 2010, and reported his denial of the allegations connected with the USAID program.
