= Cuban hip-hop =

Music genre

Cuban hip-hop is a genre of hip-hop. Hip-hop arrived in Cuba via radio and TV broadcasts from Miami. During the 1980s, hip hop culture in Cuba was mainly centered on breakdancing. By the 1990s, with the collapse of the Soviet Union and the onset of the Special Period, young rappers, exposed to foreign tourists whose wealth highlighted their struggle, turned to rapping to affirm their heritage and advocate for further revolutionary reforms.

== Early days: Importation ==
The importation of Cuban rap is debated, but many argue that it was brought from Miami. Rap hit Cuba approximately a quarter century ago, gaining popularity in the 1990s after the fall of the Soviet Union. However it existed among young moneros, who had a tremendous oral ability and linguistic creativity. At the beginning of establishing Rap in Cuba rap like rock was perceived as a foreign import and while it was never forbidden, neither was it promoted or encouraged" The Cuban government changed its perceptions about hip hop during 1999 when they declared it as an authentic expression of Cuban culture. In addition the government formed the Agencia Cubana de Rap (The Cuban Rap Agency) that provides state-run record label and hip hop magazine, and began supporting the annual Cuban Hip Hop festival. Cuban rappers injected a renovating energy into Cuban music that was taken from hip hop culture. Rap in Cuba began to emerge precisely during the gangsta rap period in the United States which included artists like 2Pac, Notorious B.I.G, Ice-T, Snoop Dogg and many more influential gangster rappers.

Gradually this began to change as raperos began to express their own reality and make use of traditional Cuban culture. One sentiment expressed involved how Cuban politics were not keeping pace with social reality. All Cubans are discouraged from visiting government-designated 'tourist zones,' such as the fancy restaurants and night clubs in Old Havana, and police will ask most who show up there for ID. But statistics show that the police arrest Afrocubans all over the island more often than Whites. Many Afrocubans believed government assumes Blacks are more likely to be involved in criminal activity. This exclusion from night life led to the importance of house parties where raperos were able to establish their own "underground" hip hop scene. The financial constraints of tourist geared night clubs that only accept dollars or venues that cost up to the equivalent of a standard monthly Cuban salary for entry also aided in the significance of house parties in the Cuban hip hop scene.

In the mid-1990s, the music scene was one of the most promising for Cubans to meet tourists and gain possible access to much needed hard currency. Hip-hop developed new dance moves involving the 'solo' female body: the despelote (all-over-the-place) and tembleque (shake-shudder) and the subasta de la cintura (waist auction). These moves define a solo female dance style which involves fast movement and turning/swirling of the area from below shoulders and chest to pelvis (as if one was hula hoop-ing or belly dancing). Often accompanied by hand and body gestures mimicking self-pleasuring, it constituted a noticeable change in dance style, of women dancing to be 'looked at' both by their partners, by other prospective partners, and by other spectators, using their body as a major asset. This was in contrast to traditional dancing such as normative couple dancing.

== Birth of a Cuban scene ==
=== American Influence ===
The change in both attitude towards hip hop and the move towards home grown expression was in part facilitated by the involvement of New Afrikan Revoluationay Nehanda Abiodun, a U.S. Black Liberation Army activist in political exile in Cuba. Upset with what she saw as blind imitation of commercial US rap culture with its depiction of thug life, violence, and misogyny, Abiodun began working with the Malcolm X Grassroots Movement in the US to bring progressive US hip hop artists to Cuba. This led to the Black August benefit concerts held in New York City and Havana, which have featured artists such as Erykah Badu, David Banner, Common, dead prez, Fat Joe, the Roots, Jean Grae, Les Nubians, Chuck D, Gil Scott-Heron, Dave Chappelle, Tony Touch, Black Thought, Mos Def, Talib Kweli, La Bruha, and Imani Uzuri.

The Black August Collective that was formed, and the concerts these progressive US artists gave in Cuba, played a key role in expanding and raising the profile of conscious, politicized rap within Cuba. Many Cuban rappers felt an affinity to the revolutionary aspects of the work these artists created. The Black August Hip Hop Collective Statement of Purpose offers that "Our goal is to bring culture and politics together and allow them to naturally evolve into a unique hip hop consciousness that informs our collective struggle for a more just, equitable and human world". Despite the movement's association with an identity other than Cuban, the government supported The Black August Collective and allowed the rappers to perform as they were supportive of the revolution. The youth of Cuba were fascinated not only by this style of music, but also by the Black Pride of the performers. This consciousness of struggle and achieving the goals of revolution are a key characteristic of a majority of Cuban hip hop today.

=== The Underground Scene ===
Music production technology was either unaffordable or simply not present during the early days of Cuban hip-hop, making it virtually impossible to duplicate the exotic sounds found within the genre. This lack of technology led to the private gatherings of very devoted fans called bonches. These bonches can be considered the beginning of today's Cuban rap community. Only the most dedicated fans would be in attendance and they would receive an understanding of rap's evolvement and fame outside of Cuba.

Eventually, the gatherings attracted an unsustainable amount of listeners, forcing them out of their private homes. In 1994, rap entrepreneur Adalberto Jímenez was able to get a public space for Cuban hip-hop gatherings. This public space was known as, El local de la Moña. This place soon became a popular social hub for fans of Cuban hip-hop. Moñas were so popular that it became the Cuban word for rap and Moñeros for rappers or rap enthusiasts.

La Moña moved around a great deal and became a sort of traveling party in Old Havana. La Moña charged a 5-peso admission charge (20 cents USD.) In January 1999, La Moña moved to a tiny club called La Pampa and they had raised the price of admission to 20 pesos. La Moña still remains the only place for moñeros to hear the latest underground rap in Cuba.

In the underground scene of Cuba, freestyle becomes a manifestation of a communal establishment (usually the community of rappers and audience come to form a cycle) where those who are not rapping provide vocalized "backing track", opened for anyone to jump it for a freestyle. Cuban scholar Geoffrey Baker argues that those music-making circles "enable a community to generate (rather than simply embody) a different social order and a distinct set of moral values."

=== Government Support ===
Hip-hop arrived in the public eye with the launch of the "Festival de Rap Cubano" in 1995, a joint effort by Grupo Uno and the state-run Asociación de Hermanos Sais (AHS). Despite poor promotion and the remote location, it became a huge success. Rap cubano emerged as a distinct genre when Amenaza (now known internationally as the Orishas) incorporated Afro-Cuban bata percussion into their performance at the 1996 festival, winning them first place in the competition. The same year, Cuba's first all-female rap group, Instinto, secured second place for their energetically charged rap flow and performance. By 1999, through the aid of the Hip Hop Manifesto (written by DJ Ariel Fernandez), rap cubano and rock music (another marginalized musical genre in Cuba) was declared "an authentic expression of Cuban culture" by Abel Prieto, Cuba's Minister of Culture. Fidel Castro deemed hip hop music to be at the "vanguard of the Revolution" because of its revolutionary message. This resulted in the formation of the Agencia Cubana de Rap (Cuban Rap Agency), the state's organization that runs a record label and hip hop magazine, Movimiento.

In 2002 the government formed the Agencia Cubana de Rap (Cuban Rap Agency) with its own record label and hip hop magazine to help promote the art form on the island. Weekly radio and TV shows were launched. With the creation of the Cuban Rap Agency by the Cuban government, this group encouraged and endorsed various rappers and created their albums. However, there was a down-side to this agency that affected the popularity of the CRA. Getting artists and bands radio time and fame, came at a slight price; there were limits as to how artists could express themselves. Thus, the CRA would only endorse groups that were willing to change their lyrics and music styles to those that were accepted by the government and community. As a result, not many groups or artists were willing to give into the CRA expectations.

However, that early support waned in the mid 2000s, drawing criticism from raperos who felt robbed of their platform to address social problems. In 2006, after ten years of hosting popular Cuban raperos, the AHS disbanded the "Festival Cubano de Rap" showing the real mission of the CRA.

This is the reason why in 2006, "Comision Depuradora" was born, which was the joint effort of 43 dissident rappers (the censured ones) to continue producing, promoting and performing, led by Aldo Rodríguez who were supported by "MatraKa Producciones" an independent and also dissident group directed by Michel Matos, dedicated to support and promote Cuban arts and the freedom of expression. This inspired a renewed interest in independent concerts and festivals and a revival of the underground scene at events like Project Almendares in the Vedado district of Havana, hosted by prominent local DJ Alexis "D'Boys" Rodriguez and financed by international backers as well as "Puños Arriba" awards, created to recognize the work of rappers in many different categories like "love song", "beef", "Social song" among others also produced by "MatraKa Producciones" and directed first by Adrian Monzon AKA "vjcuba" on the first event and then by Soandry del Rio from "Hermanos de Causa", a veteran from the first "Festival de Alamar" in 1995.

=== Nightlife ===
Hip hop and rap clubs, while scarce today in Cuba, emerged as an open and affordable gathering space for lower and middle-class Cubans who are increasingly excluded from other forms of Havana nightlife due to rising prices, dollarization of popular clubs and increasing segregation on behalf of tourists and the wealthy Cuban elite. Under these divisive socio-economic conditions, hip hop and rap concerts have now come to represent a space of open debate and social and political discussion for many young Cubans. Topics such as racism, tourism and police harassment are often addressed openly in these spaces through music and performance as well as through participatory discussion.

== Criticism of Cuban hip hop ==
Many have criticized the new movement of Cuban Reggaeton and hip hop artists for their recent change in meaning of the music. Cuban rappers attack social and political issues concerning Cuba such as racism, class struggles and police harassment etc. But as pressure for commercial success increases, some artists have toned down their political or socially conscious content, and instead have focused on tropes common in commercial rap. Many of the grass roots artists do not understand the recent change of rapping about partying, cars, and women. "Hip-hop in the United States started out as a voice of protest, an alternative voice for urban, inner-city youth to voice their grievances, to talk about their living conditions, their hopes and aspirations," said Abiodun, a member of the Black Liberation Party before fleeing to Cuba 14 years ago as a U.S. fugitive facing racketeering charges. "But now what we see in terms of rap in the United States, for the most part, it's really not talking about anything." Also many criticize the objectification of females in the dancing and in videos. Some see it as dominant if the women dance in front of the men in a "doggy style" position, but critics see it as a way of letting the male take initial control over the female. Also many argue that the females in those music videos are objectifying themselves to seem lower than men.

Music videos are becoming more explicit. To gain a following of their music, Cuban hip hop artists are continuously using provocatively dressed females. This sexual image in their videos is taking away from the audiences ability to actually listen to the lyrics and understand them. The lyrics being addressed recently by Cuban hip hop artists stand as a rebellion against the many downfalls, such as poverty and racism, that their nation is currently fighting. It would benefit all of Cuba to take the time to understand the lyrics and not just watch the images of the videos.

Sexually charged dancing (like grinding and "doggy style") often associated with hip hop, are not the only things criticized. In recent years, Hip-hop has merged with Cuban culture to the point it can be heard in parades, school dances, and clubs. This has given rise to the problem of children, 16 or younger, hearing and singing the lyrics found in Cuban hip hop and reggaeton, which often make reference to sexual activities.

Cuban hip hop that addresses political issues, however, are not widely commercialized. These types of music that can be listen to by all Cubans of any age, tend to stay underground and are suppressed by the government, leaving a majority of Cubans no choice but to listen to salsa, reggaeton, or mainstream rap.

== Clash with Reggaetón ==
Most recently, the term "underground" has become more appropriate for rap. The most popular urban music in the country is now reggaeton. Recently, there has been an explosion in popularity of reggaeton, particularly among Cuba's 5 million people under the age of thirty. Reggaetœn –whose lyrics emphasize sensuality, individualism and sex, in graphic and sexually explicit terms– stands in sharp contrast to the tradition of Cuban underground rap, the content of which is more often characterized by social commentary on inequality and injustice. Reggaetón versus Cuban rap has become a contentious debate in Cuba. It's driven many within the socially conscious rap scene to paint reggaetón as the "enemy" due to its focus on mindless dancing rather than community reflection. Furthermore, its critics condemn the genre as lyrically and musically deficient, morally questionable, and too commercially oriented. Nehanda Abiodun, an American living in Cuba to avoid charges of racketeering, who has advocated strongly for Cuban hip hop and rap, said of reggaetón "There is an element of commercialism that's creeping in...You cannot blame these young people for wanting to see the fruits of their labor, but will they be able to maintain that responsible, intellectual rap and still get paid?"

According to Geoff Baker, rap promotes social awareness better than reggaetón. Since rap is verbally expressed with a lesser focus on dancing the artists can more easily convey their messages. In contrast reggaetón places a larger emphasis on movement expression than vocal expression. Furthermore, Baker attributes a lack of originality to reggaetón because only a single unchanging beat may be heard throughout a whole track. An article from a major Cuban social change news source, "Cubanet," reinforces the opinion that rap motivates change while reggaetón inspires merely dancing. The article quotes Cuban rapper Cabera, aka Papa Humbertico explaining that rap talks "about the reality of a Cuban's life in our songs, what happens to us in the street." In contrast Cabera believes ""All reggaeton does is make people stupid." The author of the article assumes that Cabera's statement derives from the "preoccupation" with dance of reggaetón. In summary, some believe that rap is more easily expressive while reggaetón conveys its message less understandably through dance.

The dissemination of reggaetón in Cuba is altogether peculiar and familiar. The guerilla marketing of reggaetón with its homespun production value, bicycle taxi advertising and the informal mass distribution in urban areas has led to its accessibility to the Cuban community at large. This rings familiar with US music industry marketing strategies. The peculiarity of reggaetón's dissemination is raised when contextualized within the nationalistic Cuban hip hop scene. Socially conscious hip hop was nationalized into Cuba "as a process of engagement between artists and audiences mediated by the state, rather than by the music industry or by recording technology." This stark contrast between the sources of support and means of dissemination is just one of several reasons of conflict between the two genres in Cuban popular music.

== Themes in Cuban Hip-Hop ==
A search for identity is characteristic of the genre. The challenge of situating themselves within the Revolution, which in its early days professed to eliminate racial and class distinctions, defines the artistry of most raperos. Many Cuban rappers use their music as an opportunity to speak out against problems within Cuba or on global issues including war, racism, and pollution. Many Cuban rappers refer to the subjects of their rap as temas sociales or "social themes." By involving these social and political themes, they try to make their music constructive and influential to their listeners. Two important themes that are manifested in many of the songs involves the global issue of AIDS and the destructiveness of war. Although these themes may be useful to the listeners in Cuba, many people speak against the governments use of music to influence people. Politics is so deeply rooted in the hip hop scene in Cuba that the revolutionary image of Che Guevara is frequently seen, as the late figure represents the early stage in the Revolution and embodies youthful idealism. According to Geoffrey Baker, the history and legend of Che allows artists to practice "safe radicalism."

There are many ways in which Cuban hip hop artists achieve a sense of nationalism through their music. Many Cuban hip hop artists attempt through the musical backing track arrangements and sounds. Rhythms borrowing from traditional Cuban music style have been incorporated in hip hop music. Native instruments such as bata drums, maracas, and guaguanco have been part of the indigenization hip hop music in Cuba.

In addition to musical instrumentation, language also plays a large part in the shaping and nationalization of Cuban hip hop. Language barriers between the US and Cuba allowed for Cuban hip hoppers to embrace the musical aesthetic of the music, but leave behind the lyrical content. This can be seen through similarity between Cuban and US hip hop beats; and the differences between lyrical content performed over the US songs and Cuban songs. Additionally, the distinct (Cuban) Spanish dialect used to deliver the lyrics contributes to the nationalistic value of Cuban hip hop, and is viewed as characteristic which sets it apart from other Spanish-speaking countries and the US alike.

The lyrical content, in and of itself, also speaks to the struggles and hardships experienced by Cubans in impoverished inner city areas of Havana. The harsh Cuban reality, in this way, provides a lens into the unique inner-city experience of Cubans suffering from socio-economic hardships. According to Marc Ramirez, hip hop has acted as tool for youth in Cuba to speak out. Here, Ramirez pinpoints the importance of hip hop in Cuban culture—even more so than other native musical styles: "In Cuba, where teenagers and young adults see their world torn by social ills including street hustling and racism, there are worse things to worry about than power outages. And it's hip-hop - not salsa or rumba or the Buena Vista Social Club - that sustains the disillusioned" (Ramirez). Additionally, political and historical events are resonant in the music making, it a unique expression of Cuban culture. For instance, the group Instisto incorporates texts about the Afro-Cuban deity Obatala. Additionally, the rap duo Anónimo consejo frequently expresses their love for Cuba through their politically and socially conscious lyrics.

At the same time that Cuban rappers have used the genre to speak out about the realities of their daily lives and issues that are often politely overlooked in Cuban culture, they also walk a fine line since so much of the hip hop scene is supported by the government. When the state and its nationalist perspective plays such a large role in the production and promotion of Cuban hip hop, artists must make careful decisions about how much criticism they really want to offer of the regime. When they rap about the realities of race or the sense that poverty and economic hardship are not being alleviated by the state, they risk breaking the close ties they have to the government and thus put their success on the line. Some groups have gone too far and faced sanctions or censorship However, many Cuban artists seem to have reached a consensus with the state's involvement in rap, accepting that the government's role may lead to better production, more support, and more commercial exposure. On the other hand, the government seems to accept and respect the revolutionary nature of hip hop and embrace that it is a means for the marginalized or downtrodden to speak up. In fact, many Cuban rap groups openly criticize the government, and many others openly assimilate to the government's nationalist ideals. The relationship can be characterized as encompassing both censorship and assimilation

Although rap Cubano clearly adopted many musical techniques and stylistics characterized by rap in the US, the artists do not take such an adversarial role against the Cuban government for several reasons. First, the state supports hip hop culture as a vehicle of progressive revolution which is openly accepted in the midst of a polarized socio-political shift from Communism to Market Capitalism. Secondly, young Havana artists realize that their government provides free health care and education, as well as a generally more equitable distribution of resources. In contrast to US rap, rap Cubano's economic, and socio-political support elucidates a stark discrepancy in the motivation and ethos of the genres. While the foundation of gangsta rap is rooted in histories of state abandonment and discrimination, rap Cubano formulates a less polarized musical expression that lyrically portrays the realities of a new generation of Cuban artists searching for identity.

== Women in Cuban Hip-Hop ==
Like men, women were distinctly affected by the introduction of capitalism into Cuba. Jineterismo, a form of prostitution for tourists, affords poor Cuban women access to American dollars that they cannot earn working for the state. Despite the sacrifice of their bodies to earn money, raperas assert that equality is impossible without showing them respect, too.

While many female rappers exist, the lesbian trio, Krudas Cubensi, otherwise known as Las Krudas, have received a lot of attention in numerous documentaries and dissertations for their open homosexual identity. Las Krudas went on to form Omega Kilay (a female rap collective) in 1999 with fellow female rappers (raperas), I-n-I, DJ Leidis, DJ Yary. The majority of these women have left Cuba, however, along with many other male rappers due to ongoing censorship and lack of performance opportunities. The female group Explosion Femenina (or Oye Habana) combines sex appeal with wit to captivate its audience. Other female rappers like Mariana and Telmary have broken out of all-male crews to establish their own voice and talents. Rather than identify as Cuban first and foremost, members of Las Krudas call themselves other things as well: feminists, Afro-Cubans, and poor. The group speaks out against machismo, the dominance of men in Latin American cultures like Cuba. For Las Krudas, it is important to acknowledge social and economic differences among Cubans in order to re-imagine the gender roles that restrict many Cuban women in domestic roles like housekeeping.

Without widespread commercialization of music throughout Cuba, female hip-hop groups depend on public performances to express their identity and struggles. As Afro-Cuban men attempt to re-insert race into public conversations, their female counterparts simultaneously advocate racial and feminist discourses. Contrary to American hip-hop's reputation for outspoken misogyny, Cuban hip-hop has developed spaces for feminist thought due to Las Krudas and other female groups.

Still, state control of the industry has limited their popularity and success. Concerts organized by the Cuban Agency of Rap often fail to pay female performers. In one instance, eleven performances combined to feature one woman, Magía Lopez of the husband-wife duo Obsesión, who was under contract with the Agency. On one hand, female raperas identify many flaws within Cuba that reflect failures of the Revolution to achieve equality. On the other, they assert that their brand of hip-hop is as Cuban, and therefore revolutionary, as any cultural production on the island. This is seen in "Vamos a Vence," a Las Krudas song which incorporates rhetoric first used by Fidel Castro to inspire community, pride, and a revolutionary spirit within the Cuban people. In a 21st-century context, this defines a struggle for gender equality as well as the persistence of other social inequities that Cuban raperos first tackled.

Today, current and former members of Las Krudas live in the United States, where they continue to advocate for gender and sexual equality through North American tours, Internet campaigns, and trips to Cuba to support up and coming artists.

== Distribution ==
From the 1980s onward, Cubans have shared their love of music in private circles. The first sounds of American hip-hop came from Miami through radio waves in homes throughout Havana and elsewhere on the island. As raperos toured internationally during the 1990s, they brought back new records and mixtapes on CDs which exposed them to a greater diversity of music. Very few albums were actually sold in Cuba, however.

As the Internet became widely used worldwide, Cubans were left out of an explosion of cultural production and transmission. By the turn of the 21st century, international travel had become less restrictive for artists and more and more CDs came back. Quemadores, literally "burners," decided to copy CDs onto USB flash drives to be shared person-to-person. This practice continues today alongside the pakete, a curated collection of entertainment including international rap music drawn from YouTube and other Internet sources.

== Cuban slang ==
Yuma is a Cuban street slang word for foreigners in general. Originally this word meant "Yankee", a person from the United States. Cubans used this word only for people from the U.S. and also still today to refer to the country itself as "el Yuma" or "la Yuma", but U.S. people are not the only visitors to Cuba therefore the meaning was naturally extended to all foreigners. A song was made named "A ti te gustan los yumas." There were a couple reasons why this song was made, including the thought that Cuban women prefer foreign men for money.

== Notable Groups ==
As of 2016, there were over 500 signed hip-hop artists in Cuba. However, whilst there has been much academic and media interest in Cuban hip hop, few Cuban groups have managed to be heard outside of the island.

Probably the most successful rap group to come out of Cuba was the Orishas. Starting off under the name "Amenaza" or "Threat," the group was the first to deal with issues of race and challenge Castro's idea of colorless, or "color-blind," society. However, the Orishas relocated to Paris in 1998. There, they produced rap and hip hop with the classic Cuban sounds of salsa and rumba.

In 2003 Europe based female Cuban singer Addys Mercedes released her innovative album "Nomad" mixing her Cuban roots with elements of hip hop, house and R&B. In her 2012 released 3rd album "Addys", which was mainly produced in a singer/songwriter atmosphere, Addys Mercedes in the song "Alma Latina" was rapping about immigration from Cuba.

The movement dwindled in popularity in the mid-2000s. Constrained by the state and seeing better economic opportunities elsewhere, artists like Ariel Fernandez Diaz and Las Krudas left for the United States, Europe, or other countries in Latin America. They constitute a Cuban hip-hop voluntary exile community that utilizes more widely available Internet resources and exposure to voice socially-conscious messages.

Los Aldeanos led a new generation of raperos in the late 2000s and early 2010s who rejected a conciliatory tone towards the Cuban government. Facing censorship for more aggressive anti-state rhetoric, the group was controversial within Cuba. In recent years, it has been discovered that the group was in part financed by a Serbian contractor. Additional accusations of support from USAID contribute to a state belief that Los Aldeanos worked against the Revolution. Like many other groups, the duo has moved abroad to more freely work.

== Films ==
- 2003 - Inventos: Hip Hop Cubano. Directed by Eli Jacobs-Fantauzzi.
- 2006- "East of Havana". Directed by Jauretsi Saizarbitoria and Emilia Menocal.
- 2007 - "Guerrilla Radio: The Hip-Hop Struggle Under Castro". Directed by Thomas Nybo, Produced by Simon Umlauf
- 2010 - "Golden Scars" Directed by Alexandrine Boudreault-Fournier
- 2012 - "Coming Home" Directed by Michael Garcia. Produced by DJ EFN.

== Sources ==
- "Pacini-Hernandez, Deborah and Reebee Garofalo. "The emergence of rap Cubano: An historical perspective." In Music, Space, and Place, ed. Whitely, Bennett, and Hawkins, 89–107. Burlington, VT: Ashgate, 2004."
