= Estrellas en el Hielo season 2 =

Estrellas en el Hielo
- Season 2

Release
- Original network: TVN
- Original release: October 23, 2008

Season chronology
- ← Previous; Estrellas en el Hielo (season 1)

The second season of Estrellas en el Hielo premiered on October 23, 2008; the first results show was an elimination episode airing on October 30, 2008. The show followed the format of previous seasons, with 9 couples.

== Couples ==
The contestants were announced during the season finale of the first season of Estrellas en el Hielo by the hosts of the show, Rafael Araneda and Karen Doggenweiler. The contestants were:

Celebrity	Occupation	Professional partner	Status	Place
Ronny Munizaga	Dancer	Roberta Davagnino	Eliminated 1st on October 30, 2008	#9
Carla Ballero	TV host, presenter and Model	Engeny Kerstia	Eliminated 2nd on November 6, 2008	#8
Jorge Garcés	Football manager	Olga Guseva	Eliminated 3rd on November 13, 2008	#7
Fabián Estay	Football midfielder	Ludmila Ksenofontova	Eliminated 4th on November 20, 2008	#6
Patricia López	Actress	David Campos	Eliminated 5th on November 27, 2008	#5
Andrea Molina	TV host	Artiom Sarkisyan		
Daniela Castillo	Singer and Member former of the show Rojo	Pablo Lashmanov		
Fernanda Hansen	Commentarist and journalist	Alfonso Campa		
Guido Vecchiola	Actor	Darya Garuzina		

== Scoring chart ==
Red numbers indicate the couples with the lowest score for each week.
Green numbers indicate the couples with the highest score for each week.
indicates the couples eliminated that week.
indicates the returning couple that finished in the bottom two.
indicates the returning couple was the last to be called safe (they may or may have not been in the bottom two).
indicates the winning couple.
indicates the runner-up couple.
indicates the third-place couple.
This couple was immune.

Team	Place	1	2	1+2	3	4	5	6	7	8	9	10
Andrea & Artiom		12	15	27	19	20	19+22=41	26+27=53				
Daniela & Pablo		17			15	21	20+24=44	23+24=47				
Fernanda & Alfonso		17	10	27	19	23	22+24=46	25+25=50				
Guido & Darya		19	19	38	21	23	20+27=47	28+29=57				
Patricia & David		15	18	23	16	19	20+25=45	24+25=49				
Fabián & Ludmila		14	14	28	15	20	19+22=41					
Jorge & Olga		9	12	21	16	17						
Carla & Engeny		10	10	20	11							
Ronny & Roberta		13	11	24								

- Weeks 1. The dance partner of Ronny Munizaga, Roberta Davagnino, got hurt while they were testing 3 hours before the program, in her replacement there came Anastasia Soquina, who had to learn the choreography in less than 3 hours. Daniela Castillo was immune (badword).
- Weeks 2. The journalist Fernanda Hunsen, was hurt during the rehearsals, causing cuts in her head, the imagen of her fall was shocking on having seen the blood in the track of ice, nevertheless she present equally they achieve only a of 10 points.
- Weeks 3. In the episode 3, Carla Ballero appeared to skating, ignoring the medical orders, the one who recommended to her to skate for an injury in her tendon. She skated a medicine being injected for the pain.

== Songs ==
=== Week 1 ===
==== Running order ====
Couple	Music
Carla & Engeny	"Eres" – Café Tacvba
Ronny & Anastasia	"Relax" – Frankie Goes to Hollywood
Patricia & David	"Tiny dancer" – Elton John
Fabián & Ludmila	"El Extraño de Pelo Largo" – Los Enanitos Verdes
Fernanda & Alfonso	"Can't Fight This Feeling" – REO Speedwagon
Guido & Darya	"Ella Me Levantó" – Daddy Yankee
Andrea & Artiom	"La Incondicional" – Luis Miguel
Jorge & Olga	"I Need To Know" – Marc Anthony
Daniela & Pablo	"Bring Me To Life" – Evanescence

=== Week 2 ===
==== Running order ====
Couple	Music
Daniela & Alfonso	"Por Ti Volaré" – Andrea Bocelli
Jorge & Olga	"Me Olvidé de Vivir" – Julio Iglesias
Andrea & Artiom	"All Around The World" – Lisa Stansfield
Guido & Darya	"Everybody Hurts" – R.E.M.
Fernanda & Alfonso	"Crimen" – Gustavo Cerati
Fabián & Ludmila	"Por Amarte Así" – Cristian Castro
Patricia & David	"Suavemente" – Elvis Crespo
Ronny & Anastasia	"Everything I Do" – Bryan Adams
Carla & Engeny	"Ton Ton Ton" – Nicky Jam featuring Rakim & Ken-Y

=== Week 3 ===
==== Running order ====
Couple	Music
Patricia & David	"Piece of My Heart" – Janis Joplin
Jorge & Olga	"No Soy de Aquí" – Facundo Cabral
Andrea & Artiom	"Feeder" –
Guido & Darya	"This Love" – Maroon 5
Fernanda & Alfonso	"Tengo Mucho Que Aprender de Ti" – Emmanuel
Daniela & Pablo	"É Isso Aí" – Ana Carolina
Fabián & Ludmila	"Hey Jude" – The Beatles
Carla & Engeny	"Umbrella" – Rihanna featuring Jay-Z

=== Week 4 ===
==== Running order ====
Couple	Music
Andrea & Artiom	"Last Dance" – Donna Summer
Guido & Darya	"Feel" – Robbie Williams
Patricia & David	"Pomp Up The Jump" – Kannon
Jorge & Olga	"El Rock del Mundial" – Los Ramblers
Fernanda & Alfonso	"Este Amor Ya No Se Toca" – Yuri Gonzaga
Fabián & Ludmila	"No Me Doy Por Vencido" – Luis Fonsi
Daniela & Pablo	"Dirrty" – Christina Aguilera

=== Week 5 ===
==== Running order ====
Couple	Music
Fernanda & Alfonso	"No se Como Amarlo" – Angela Carrasco
Fernanda & Alfonso	"El Baile de la Baldosa" – Rafael Peralta
Fabián & Ludmila	"Aún Sigo Cantando" – Los Enanitos Verdes
Fabián & Ludmila	"Yo No Fuí" – Pedro Fernández
Daniela & Pablo	"Beauty and the Beast" – Céline Dion featuring Peabo Bryson
Daniela & Pablo	"Queen of the Night" – Whitney Houston
Guido & Darya	"Dame Luz"/"Baila Sin Parar" – Nicole
Guido & Darya	"Creep" – Radiohead
Andrea & Artiom	–
Andrea & Artiom	"Y Yo Sigo Aquí" – Paulina Rubio
Patricia & David	"Flashdance... What a Feeling" – Irene Cara
Patricia & David	"11 y 6" – Fito Páez

=== Week 6 ===
==== Running order ====
Couple	Music
Fernanda & Alfonso	"Y Volveré" – Los Ángeles Negros
Fernanda & Alfonso	"Rock and Roll All Nite" – Kiss
Andrea & Artiom	"Hanky Panky" – Madonna
Andrea & Artiom	"Se Dice de Mí" – Yolanda Rayo
Guido & Darya	"Step by Step" – New Kids On The Block
Guido & Darya	"Volver a Amar" – Cristian Castro
Patricia & David	"Corazones Rojos" – Los Prisioneros
Patricia & David	"The Lady in Red" – Chris de Burgh
Daniela & Pablo	"Girlfriend" – Avril Lavigne
Daniela & Pablo	"Good Enough" – Evanescence

=== Call-Out Order ===
Order	Week 1	Week 2	Week 3	Week 4	Week 5	Week 6	Week 7	Week 8	Week 9	Week 10
1	No; Eliminations	Andrea & Artiom	Andrea & Artiom	Andrea & Artiom	Andrea & Artiom	Andrea & Artiom				
2	No; Eliminations	Daniela & Pablo	Daniela & Pablo	Daniela & Pablo	Daniela & Pablo	Daniela & Pablo				
3	No; Eliminations	Fernanda & Alfonso	Fernanda & Alfonso	Fernanda & Alfonso	Fernanda & Alfonso	Fernanda & Alfonso				
4	No; Eliminations	Guido & Darya	Guido & Darya	Guido & Darya	Guido & Darya	Guido & Darya				
5	No; Eliminations	Patricia & David	Patricia & David	Patricia & David	Patricia & David	Patricia & David				
6	No; Eliminations	Fabián & Ludmila	Fabián & Ludmila	Fabián & Ludmila	Fabián & Ludmila					
7	No; Eliminations	Jorge & Olga	Jorge & Olga	Jorge & Olga						
8	No; Eliminations	Carla & Engeny	Carla & Engeny							
9	No; Eliminations	Ronny & Anastasia								

This couple came in first place with the judges
This couple came in first place with the judges and had the encore for the week
This couple came in last place with the judges
This couple came in last place with the judges and was eliminated
This couple was eliminated
This couple was eliminated and had the encore for the week
This couple was eliminated, had the encore for the week, and came in last with the judges
This couple won the competition
This couple came second overall in the competition
This couple had the inmunation for the week

== Musical Guests & Performance Dancers ==
Date	Artist	Tracks Performed
October 23, 2008	La Oreja de Van Gogh	"El Último Vals"
October 23, 2008	La Oreja de Van Gogh	"Rosas"
October 30, 2008	Jesse & Joy	"Llegaste Tú"
October 30, 2008	Luis Fonsi	"No Me Doy Por Vencido"
November 6, 2008	Douglas	"Junto a Mí"
November 13, 2008	Reik	"Inolvidable"
November 20, 2008	Axel	"Verte Reir"
November 20, 2008	Axel	"Tu Amor Por Siempre"
November 27, 2008	Amaia Montero	"Quiero Ser"
