= Correctional Services Department =

Disciplined service of the Hong Kong government

- 懲教署

Agency overview
- Formed: 31 December 1920; 105 years ago
- Jurisdiction: Hong Kong
- Headquarters: 23rd, 24th and 27th Floors, Wanchai Tower, 12 Harbour Road, Wan Chai
- Employees: 7,052 (2018)
- Minister responsible: Chris Tang, Secretary for Security
- Agency executives: Wong Kwok-hing, Commissioner; Ng Chiu-kok, Deputy Commissioner
- Website: csd.gov.hk

Correctional Services Department
- Traditional Chinese: 懲教署
- Simplified Chinese: 惩教署
Transcriptions
Standard Mandarin
- Hanyu Pinyin: Chéngjiàoshǔ
Yue: Cantonese
- Yale Romanization: Chìhng gaau chyúh
- Jyutping: Cing^{4} gaau^{3} cyu^{5}

The Correctional Services Department (CSD) is responsible for the management of prisoners and prisons in Hong Kong. The Commissioner of Correctional Services reports to the Secretary for Security.

== History ==
Although the Chief Magistrate (now Commissioner of Police) was given control over prisons in 1841, the legislation to create the department did not come into being until 1853.

CSD was part of the Hong Kong Police Force until 1879 when the role of Superintendent of Victoria Gaol was created.

The department has been financially independent from the Hong Kong Police Force since December 1920, when the Superintendent of Victoria Gaol was re-titled as the Superintendent of Prisons.

== Ranks ==
As with all of the Hong Kong Disciplined Services, British-pattern rank insignia continue to be utilised, with the only change being the replacement of the St. Edward's Crown by the Bauhinia flower crest in 1997.

Rank	UK equivalent
Commissioner of Correctional Services	General
Deputy Commissioner	Lieutenant-General
Assistant Commissioner	Major-General
Chief Superintendent	Colonel
General manager (Correctional Services Industries)	N/A
Senior Superintendent	Lieutenant-Colonel
Superintendent	Major
Chief Officer	Captain
Principal Officer	Lieutenant with a bar beneath
Officer	Lieutenant
Probationary Officer	Second Lieutenant
Technical Instructor	N/A
Instructor	N/A
Assistant Officer I	Sergeant
Assistant Officer II	Private

== Equipment ==
Corrections guards presently wear green uniforms. Prison vehicles are blue and yellow and have the logo on them.

Name	Country of origin	Type	Notes
Smith & Wesson Model 10	United States	Revolver	Standard issue
Remington 870	United States	Shotgun	Standard issue
UTAS UTS-15	Turkey	Shotgun	Exclusive use by Escort and Support Group
SIG Sauer MPX SBR	United States	Semi-automatic carbine	Exclusive use by Escort and Support Group
Ruger Mini-14	United States	Semi-automatic carbine	Exclusive use by Escort and Support Group
Colt AR-15	United States	Semi-automatic rifle	Exclusive use by Escort and Support Group
Colt LE6940	United States	Semi-automatic rifle	Exclusive use by Escort and Support Group
Type 56	China	Semi-automatic rifle	Ceremonial use only
Pepperball	United States	Less-lethal option	VKS and TCP variants in use
Tippmann 98 Custom	United States	Less-lethal option	N/A
Federal Riot Gun	United States	Less-lethal option	N/A
Penn Arms GL-1	United States	Less-lethal option	N/A
Def-Tec 37mm	United States	Less-lethal option	N/A

== Facilities ==
CSD runs 28 facilities across Hong Kong ranging from maximum security prisons to rehabilitation centres.

Facilities have different purposes, including training centres, detention centres, rehabilitation centres, and drug addiction treatment centres.

Lantau
Name of Facility	Location	Years of Operation	Facility Type	Capacity	Status/Remarks
Shek Pik Prison	Shek Pik	1984–present	Maximum security institution	426	Active
Sha Tsui Correctional Institution	Shek Pik	1972–present	Minimum security institution	121	Active
Tong Fuk Correctional Institution	Ma Po Ping	1966–present	Medium security institution	925	Active
Lai Chi Rehabilitation Centre	Shek Pik	2002–present	Minimum security institution	90	Active

New Territories
Name of Facility	Location	Years of Operation	Facility Type	Capacity	Status/Remarks
Bauhinia House	Tai Lam Chung	1984–present	Half-way House	24	Active; moved to current location in 2002
Lai King Correctional Institution	Kwai Chung	2008–present	Minimum security institution	200	Active
Chi Lan Rehabilitation Centre	Kwai Chung	2002–present	Minimum security institution	40	Active; relocated from Shek O Road to Kwai Chung in 2008
Pik Uk Correctional Institution	Sai Kung	1975–present	Maximum security institution	385	Active
Pik Uk Prison	Sai Kung	1975–present	Minimum security prison	550	Active
Siu Lam Psychiatric Centre	Tai Lam Chung	1972–present	Maximum security institution	261	Active
Tai Lam Centre for Women	Tai Lam Chung	1969–present	Maximum security institution	391	Active
Tai Lam Correctional Institution	Tai Lam Chung	1980–present	Minimum security institution	598	Active
Wai Lan Rehabilitation Centre	Tai Lam Chung	2002–present	Minimum security institution	24	Active
Lo Wu Correctional Institution	Lo Wu	2010–present	Medium security institution	1400	Active

Kowloon
Name of Facility	Location	Years of Operation	Facility Type	Capacity	Status/Remarks
Lai Chi Kok Reception Centre	Lai Chi Kok	1977–present	Maximum security institution	1484	Active
Lai Hang Rehabilitation Centre	Tai Wo Ping	2002–present	Minimum security institution	70	Active
Phoenix House	Tai Wo Ping	1983–present	Half-way house	30	Active
Pelican House	Tai Wo Ping	1995–present	Half-way house	40	Active; moved to present location in 2004

Hong Kong Island
Name of Facility	Location	Years of Operation	Facility Type	Capacity	Status/Remarks
Cape Collinson Correctional Institution	Cape Collinson	1958–present	Minimum security institution	192	Active
Pak Sha Wan Correctional Institution	Stanley	1999–present	Medium security institution	424	Active, adult no smoking correctional facility
Tung Tau Correctional Institution	Stanley	1982–present	Minimum security institution	452	Active, adult no smoking correctional facility
Stanley Prison	Stanley	1937–present	Maximum security institution	1511	Active

Hei Ling Chau
Name of Facility	Location	Years of Operation	Facility Type	Capacity	Status/Remarks
Lai Sun Correctional Institution	Hei Ling Chau	1984–present	Minimum security institution	202	Active
Hei Ling Chau Correctional Institution	Hei Ling Chau	1984–present	Medium security institution	532	Active
Hei Ling Chau Addiction Treatment Centre	Hei Ling Chau	1975–present	Drug Addiction Treatment Centre	672	Active
Nei Kwu Correctional Institution	Hei Ling Chau	2002–present	Minimum security institution	236	Active

=== Prisoner demographics ===
As of 2018 there was a daily average of 8,310 prisoners in the Hong Kong prison system.

The prisons had an occupancy rate of 81.6 per cent, while training, detention, rehabilitation, and drug addiction treatment centres had an occupancy rate of 30.8 per cent.

=== Reading materials ===
As of 2018 there were about 100,000 books in the prison libraries; the percentages by language were 83% Chinese, 10% English, and 7% not in Chinese nor English.

Prison authorities stated that they did not wish to buy too many books of non-official language to ensure the security of the prisons; Legco member Shiu Ka-chun criticised this rationale.

=== Ethics College ===
On 30 November 2023, Ethics College opened in Pak Sha Wan Correctional Institution, with its establishment sponsored by the Hong Kong Jockey Club and teachers and teaching materials provided by Hong Kong Metropolitan University.

The first batch of students comprised 75 inmates, 60 male and 15 female – the latter joining remotely from Lo Wu Correctional Institution – who enrolled in a one-year course for an applied education diploma.

Among them was Tong Ying-kit, the first person sentenced under the Hong Kong National Security Law. The first graduation ceremony was held in August 2024.

== Crest ==
Badge of the Correctional Service Department before 1 July 1997.

Flag of the Correctional Service Department before 1 July 1997.

The current crest of the force was adopted in 1997 to replace most of the colonial symbols:

- St Edward's Crown replaced by the stylised Bauhinia flower crest
- Replacement of the Royal cypher by a Compass rose, with the words "Correctional Services 懲教署" circling it
- Addition of a laurel wreath bearing the words "Correctional Services Hong Kong"

== Staff associations ==
- Hong Kong Correctional Services General Union
- Correctional Services Officers' Association
- Hong Kong Correctional Services Department Assistant Officers General Association
- Hong Kong Chinese Civil Servants' Association Correctional Services Department Branch
- The Association for the Retired Staff of the Hong Kong Correctional Services Department

== CSD in popular media ==
- TVB drama series Tomorrow Is Another Day was filmed with the full co-operation of the CSD who allowed the film crew to film and access to Stanley and other prisons.
- 2017 Independent Movie With Prisoners (同囚) was filmed as a story about prisoners being tortured inhumanly in Sha Tsui Correctional Institution. A claim that the film was based on real events was later retracted.

== Controversies ==
In February 2021, it was reported that the CSD had worked with the Security Bureau to reduce "collusion" between foreign governments and those in custody.

The CSD began to ask those in custody to produce both their HKID and foreign passports, or else consulate staff would not be allowed to assist them. In addition, for those in custody who may have broken the national security law, they would be required to sign an oath to declare their nationalities.

The Canadian government revealed that a prisoner with a Canadian passport was forced to choose a nationality on 18 January 2021.

A spokesperson for the United States said that there were now

"deep concerns that this new Hong Kong policy will compel people to declare their citizenship under duress and without an opportunity to understand the full implications of the declaration."

In response, the CSD declined to comment.

In February 2021, commissioner Woo Ying-ming claimed that some people were becoming prisoners for the glorification of being imprisoned for political reasons, and also said that district councillors would be restricted from visiting prisoners unless they give a "valid reason."

In March 2021, Apple Daily reported that sources told the newspaper that the CSD's "secret unit" handled the detention of Andy Li, who was arrested for attempting to flee to Taiwan.

In July 2023, 7 CSD officers were arrested, with allegations that they had gang raped a woman.

In January 2024, the CSD claimed that reports of a man being arrested in 2022 for sexual assaults in prison was "baseless," but several days later, Hong Kong police confirmed the report.

In June 2026, the CSD has released an anti-drug promotional video called "Obsession: The Sugar-Coated Trap" (Chinese: Obsession糖衣陷阱), which became controversial because its first half appeared to promote recreational drug use.

== Gallery ==
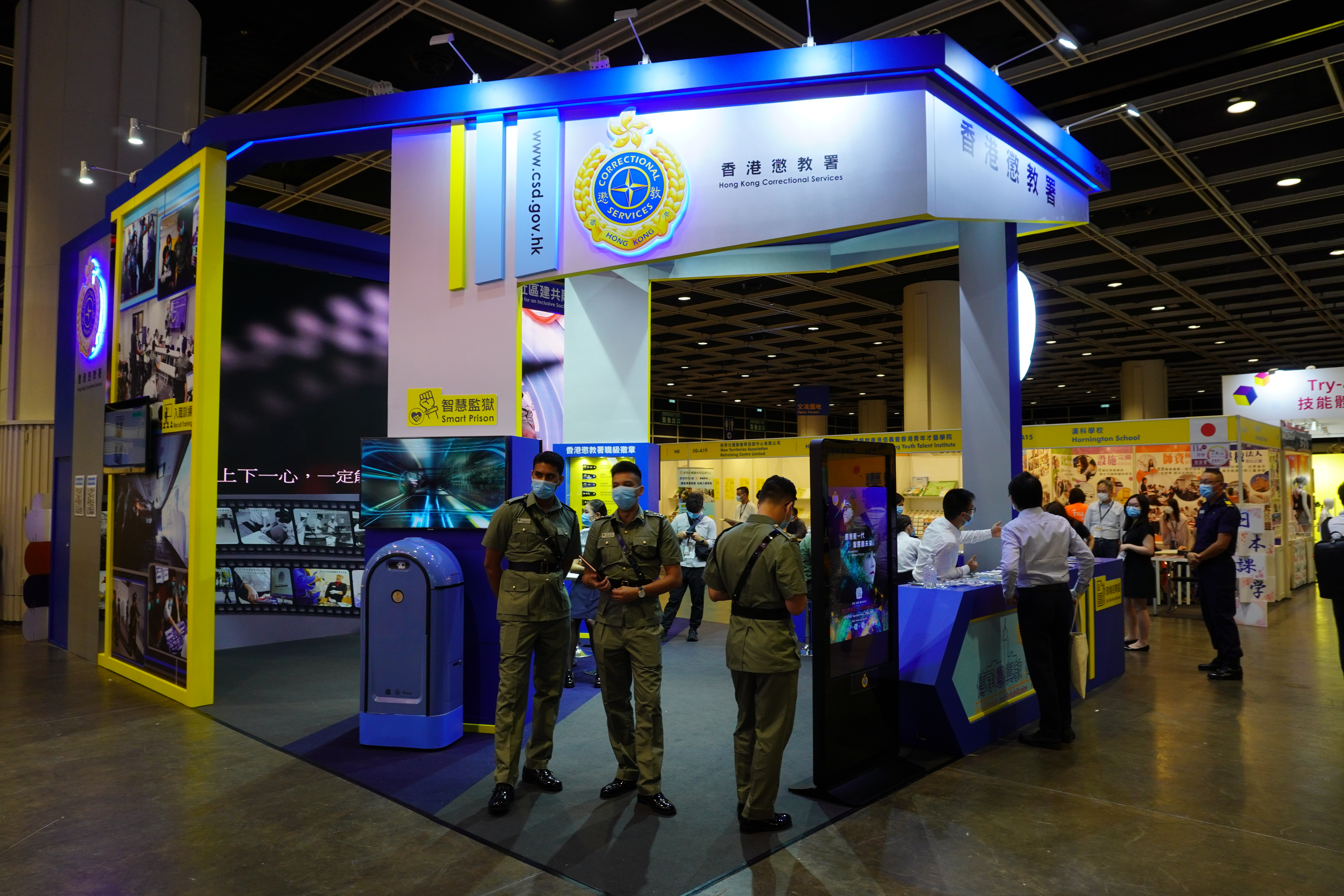
CSD staffs in the 2021 Education and Career Fair exhibition

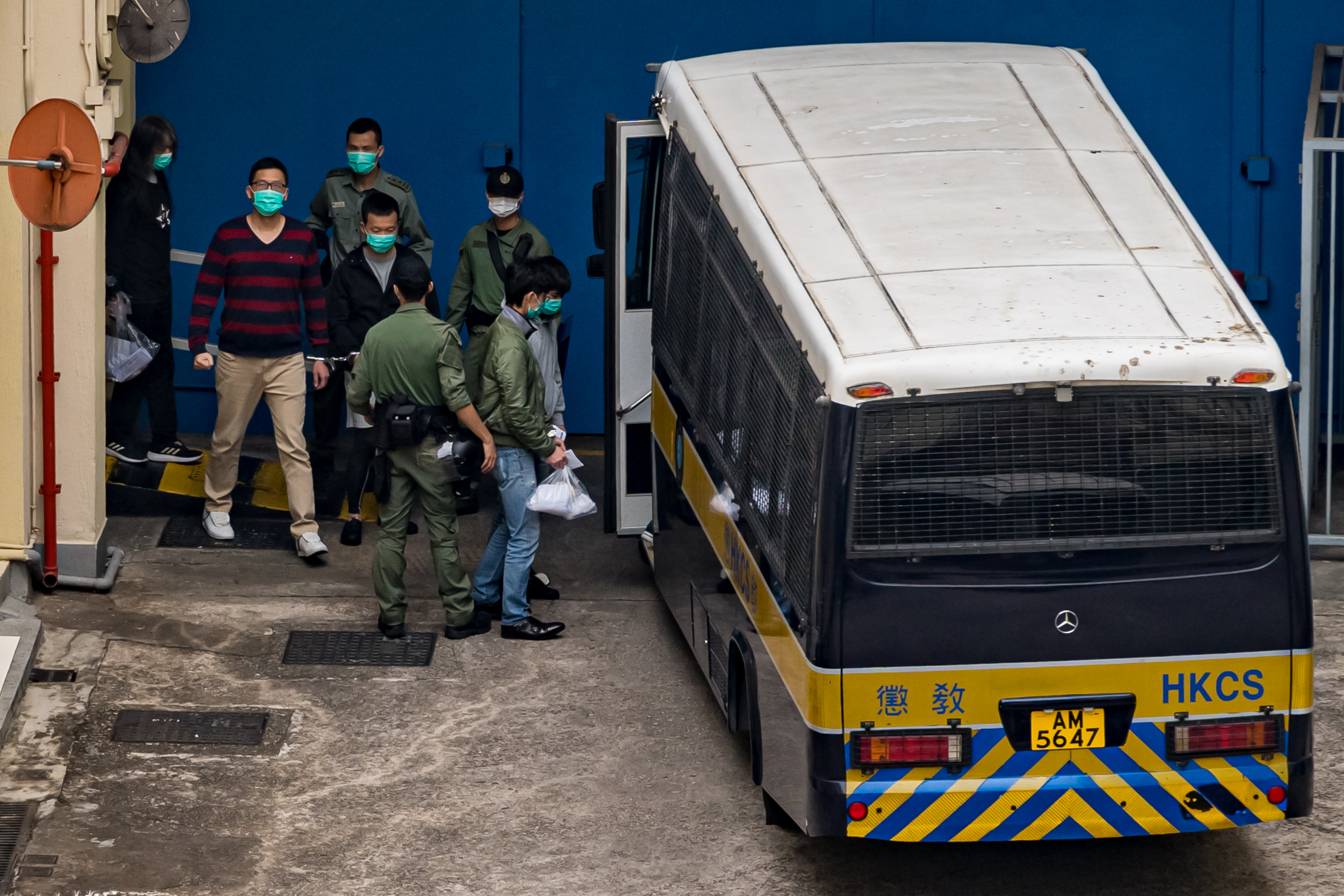
CSD guards escorting Lam Cheuk-ting and Raymond Chan Chi-chuen in Lai Chi Kok Reception Centre

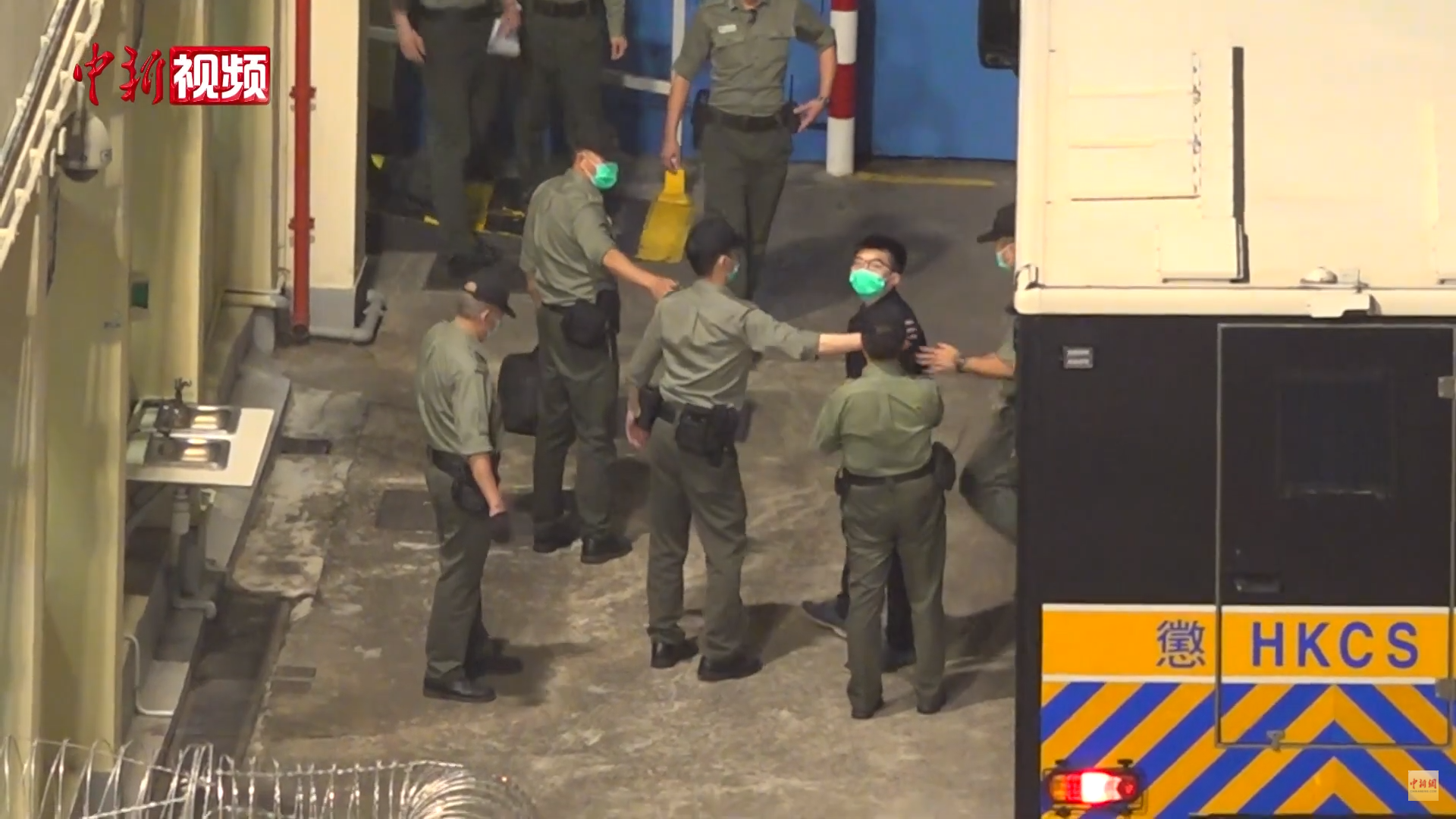
CSD guards escorting Joshua Wong in Lai Chi Kok Reception Centre

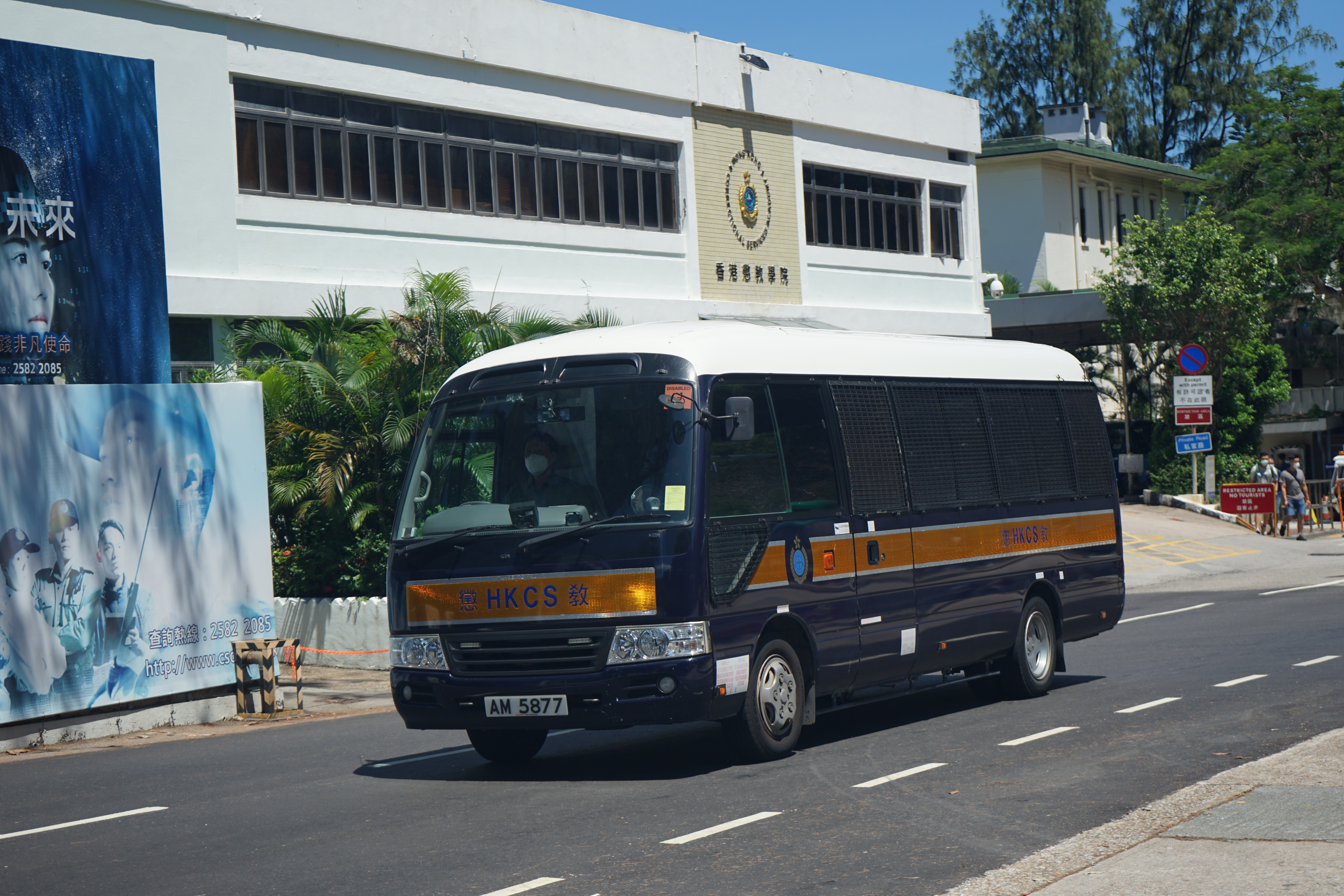

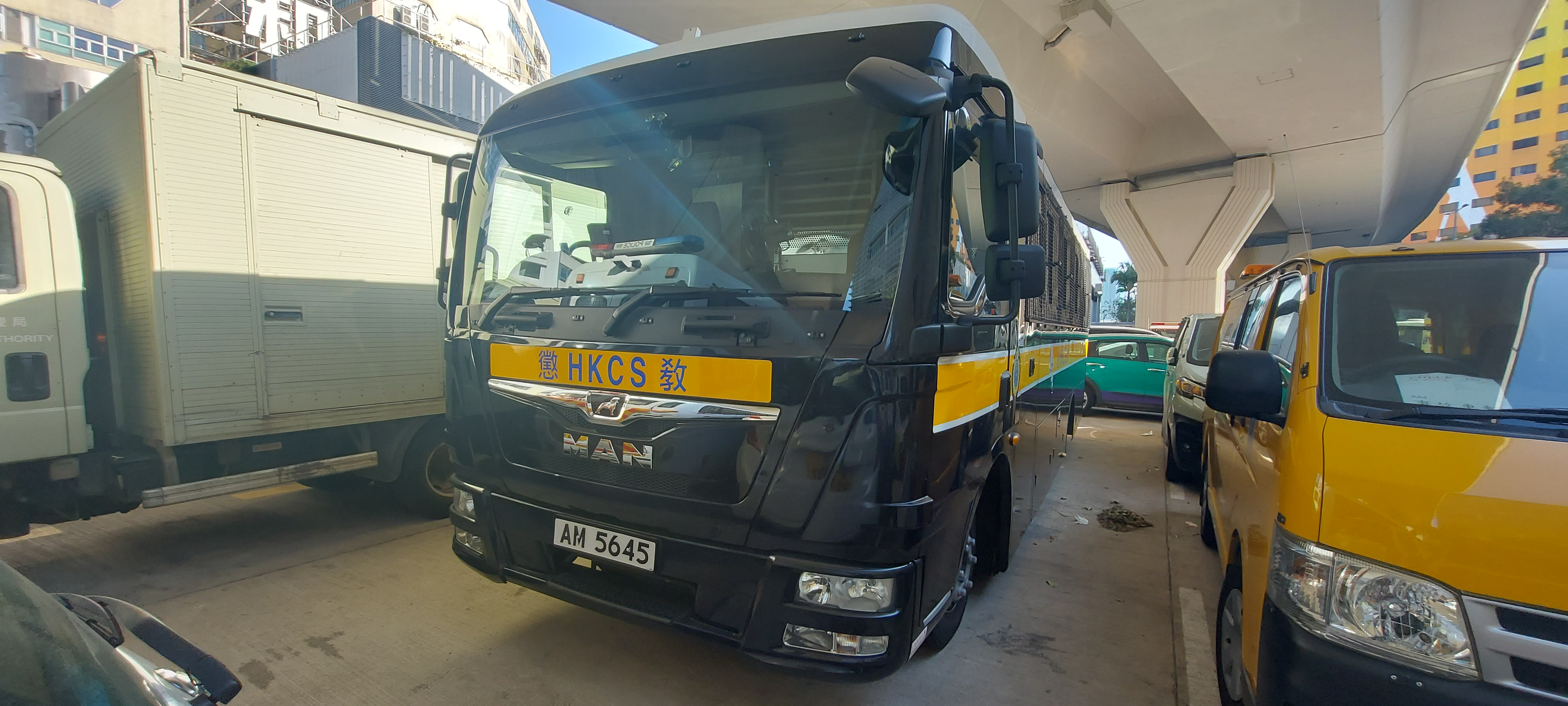

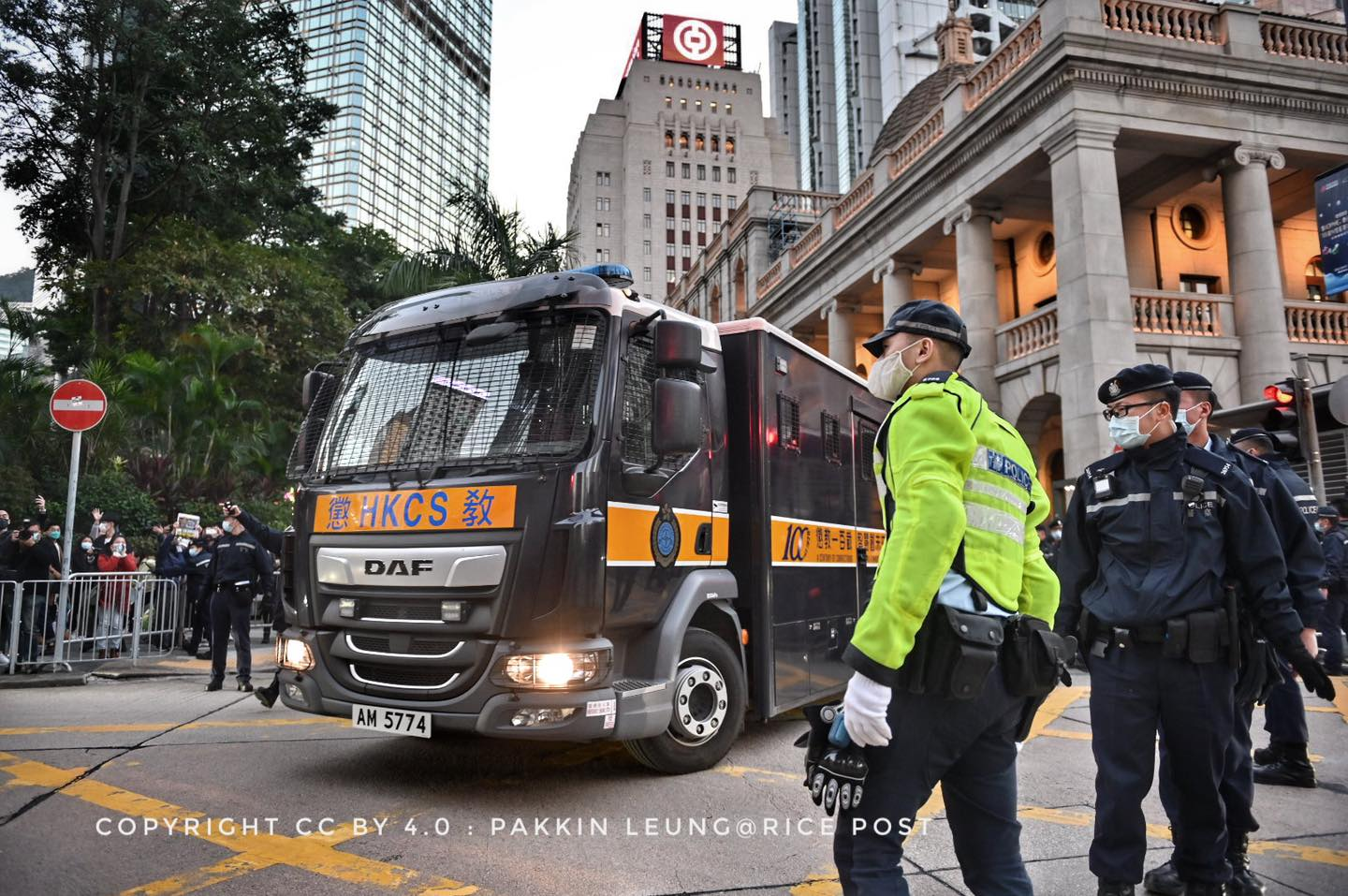

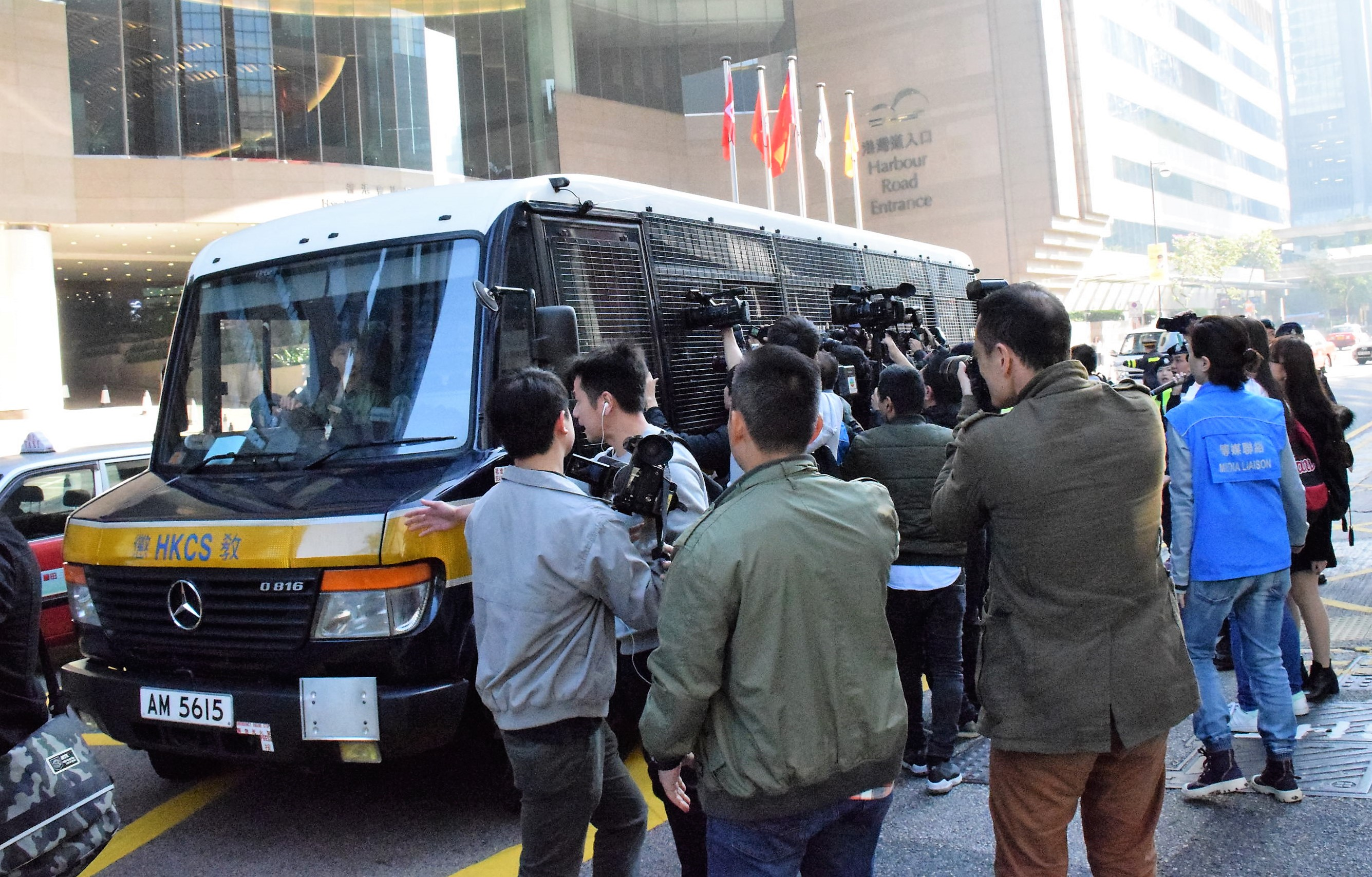

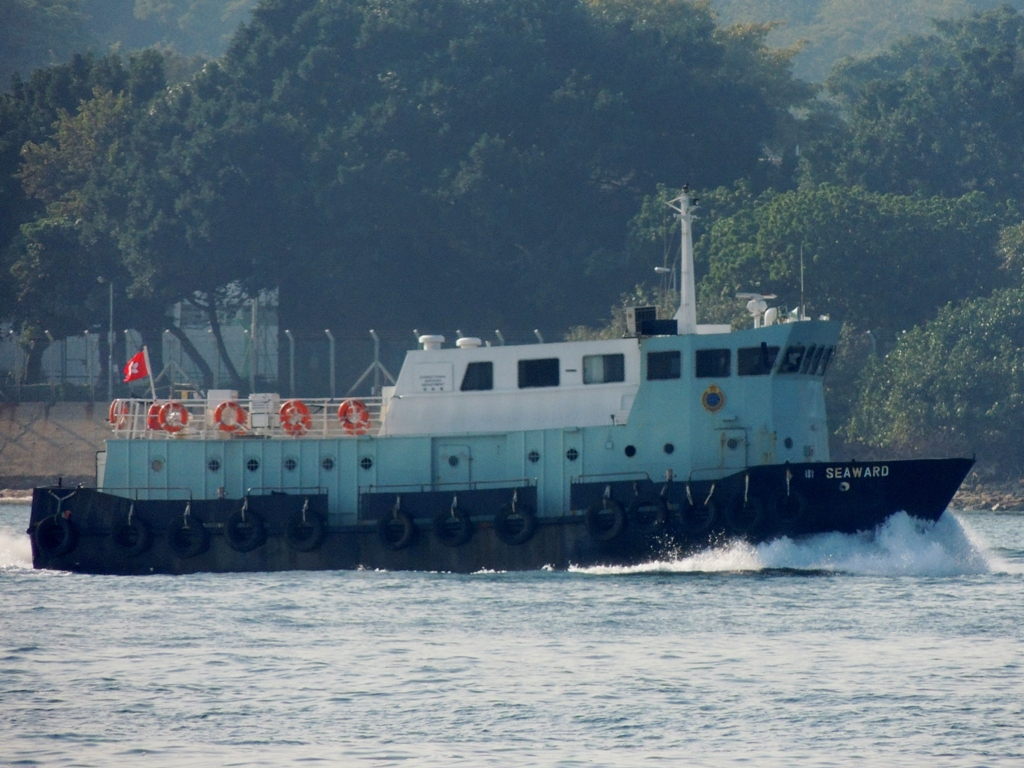
CSD ship
