= Doble Filo =

- Origin: Havana, Cuba
- Genres: Hip hop, Latin hip hop, alternative hip hop
- Years active: 1995–present
- Members: Yrak Saenz; Edgaro aka Edgar Gonzalez

Doble Filo is a Cuban hip-hop band formed in 1995 and composed of Yrak Saenz and Edgaro Gonzalez. The band, which is often compared to Dilated Peoples and The Amorphous, won the Alamar rap Festival's Grand Prize in 1996.

== History ==
Doble Filo is Spanish for “double-edged”, with reference to blades but also metaphors. Their sound is described as experimental hip-hop with a feel-good vibe. Although not all members originate from the Alamar area of La Havana, the epicentre of Cuban hip-hop, their presence there is significant. The group shares credit with fellow Cuban hip-hop artists Obsession for starting the multidisciplinary art collective La Fabrik.

They won the grand prize at the 1996 Alamar Rap Festival. Many of their songs are composed in an Alamar building called “Laboratorio 675”. Their main musical philosophy is avoiding negativity. Their most recent album is Despierta ("Wake Up"), not yet released by a record label. Gonzalez and Saenz will be making a record called Rayones de Mi Album. In 2008 Doble Filo released their first music video shot on location in Havana, for their song "Apenas Abro Los Ojos".

== Sources ==
- Video interview of Doble Filo on Havana-Cultura
- https://web.archive.org/web/20080611193425/http://cdbaby.com/cd/lafabrik
- https://www.youtube.com/watch?v=RYrTRXTcHiI
- https://www.cnn.com/2009/TRAVEL/04/01/cuba.rap/index.html
- https://web.archive.org/web/20080220011657/http://www.cubaabsolutely.com/music/hip_hop.htm
- https://web.archive.org/web/20110929113129/https://mywebspace.wisc.edu/anoguera/web/fest05/fab.htm
- http://www.film.com/movies/fabrik-cuban-hip-hop-factory/14721830
- https://www.walterlippmann.com/docs023.html
- https://web.archive.org/web/20120313203207/http://www.pr-inside.com/cuban-hip-hop-desde-el-principio-from-the-beginning-r14731.htm
- https://web.archive.org/web/20100426040522/http://hayden5media.com/music-video/apenas-abro-los-ojos
