= Obsesión (Daniela Castillo album) =

Studio album by Daniela Castillo
- Released: 2006
- Label: Universal

Obsesión is a 2006 album by the Chilean singer Daniela Castillo. The album had two singles; first in 2006 "Volar" which reached No. 10 in Chilean charts, and then 2007 "Obsesión" which peaked at 42.

== Track listing ==
1. Obsesión
2. Duele en el alma
3. Volar
4. En que lugar
5. Me robé un corazón
6. En carne viva
7. Sin ti
8. No me queda nada
9. Miénteme primero
10. Hoy
11. Estés donde estés
