= Grupo Uno =

Grupo Uno was a group of organizers from an East Havana district cultural center. They brainstormed the radical idea of a Cuban rap festival in 1995. One of the principal organizers, Rodolfo Rensoli, contributed largely to the event by anticipating the need for social and governmental support. Rensoli said that "There are a lot of people who don't understand people like me" as a reason for starting the festival in Cuba. While Grupo Uno gained official support, they had few resources at their disposal. Despite this setback, they were able to spread the word of the festival through the already existent Cuban rap scene. For the first time in Cuban history, moneros were able to express themselves publicly, mentioning many diverse cultural aspects such as race, baseball and the significance of their performance that day, all of which were in their native tongue, Spanish. The event took place in an open-air venue in Alamar, and would continue to occur there annually.

== See also ==
- Asociación Hermanos Saíz
