= Obsessed =

Obsessed may refer to:

== Film and television ==
- The Late Edwina Black (American title: Obsessed) a British murder/mystery film
- Obsessed (1977 film), an American pornographic film
- Obsessed (1987 film), a Canadian drama
- Obsessed (1992 film), an American made-for-TV drama
- Obsessed, a 2002 American TV film starring Jenna Elfman
- Obsessed (2009 film), an American thriller starring Idris Elba and Beyoncé
- Obsessed (2014 film), a South Korean erotic period thriller
- Obsessed (TV series), a documentary series

== Music ==
- The Obsessed, an American heavy metal band
  - The Obsessed (album), by the band of the same name
- Obsessed (Dan + Shay album), 2016
- Obsessed (EP), by Yahritza y Su Esencia, 2022
  - Obsessed Pt. 2, the 2023 sequel
- "Obsessed" (Mariah Carey song), 2009
- "Obsessed", a song from the 2009 EP The Time of Our Lives by Miley Cyrus
- "Obsessed", a song from the 2016 album This Is What the Truth Feels Like by Gwen Stefani
- "Obsessed", a 2017 song by Maggie Lindemann
- "Obsessed", a song from the 2020 album Leave It Beautiful by Astrid S
- "Obsessed" (Addison Rae song), 2021
- "Obsessed" (Calvin Harris song), 2022
- "Obsessed" (Olivia Rodrigo song), 2024

== Novels ==
- The Obsessed (novel), a 2001 novel by Shinji Ishii
- Obsessed (novel), a 2005 novel by Ted Dekker

== See also ==
- Obsession (disambiguation)
