= Asociación Hermanos Saíz =

The early/initial visible roots of hip hop in Cuba are believed to have emerged through break dance competitions or battles that were seen on the streets of Cuba. The continuous repetition of break dance battles were one of the strong channels or pioneers of the hip hop culture in Cuba. Some sources state that hip hop in Cuba strongly emerged in the early nineties as a way out due to the termination of the numerous subsidies that were received by the country through the Soviet. All the above-mentioned pertaining to Cuban hip hop is vital - however, none of it would have been successful without the presence of one of the two Cuban Institutions, namely Asociacion Hermanos Saiz and Agencia Cubana de Rap (Cuban Rap Agency). Asociacion Hermanos Saiz and the latter are the two initial Institutions that were funded by the Cuban Government with the major motive of promoting Rap/hip hop in Cuba more.

== See also ==
- Cuban Rap Agency
