= Obsession: The Sugar-Coated Trap =

2026 anti-drug video

- Screenshot of "Obsession: The Sugar-Coated Trap", depicting cannabis as "Cho Cho", cocaine as "Cola", methamphetamine as "Bing Yi", and etomidate as "Siu Jau" from left to right. The subtitle in the screenshot means "cocaine, methamphetamine, cannabis and etomidate"
- Produced by: Hong Kong Correctional Services Department
- Release date: June 27, 2026
- Running time: 63 seconds
- Country: Hong Kong
- Language: Cantonese

"Obsession: The Sugar-Coated Trap" (Chinese: Obsession糖衣陷阱) is an anti-drug promotional video released in 2026 by the Hong Kong Correctional Services Department (CSD). Produced by the department’s multimedia unit, it is presented in an AI-generated animation style and aims to raise awareness of drug resistance and mental health among young people. The video became controversial because its first half appeared to promote recreational drug use.

The original version was 63 seconds long. In the first 35 seconds, AI-generated female characters introduce the "benefits" of drugs, while the latter half features narration explaining their harms. The video was released on 26 June 2026 but was quickly withdrawn. A shortened "rapid reveal version" was uploaded at around 1:00 a.m. on 27 June, but was again removed within half a day due to an apparent narration error stating that "drug trafficking will not lead to imprisonment."

The incident continued to gain traction online, where the four AI characters were widely used in derivative works. Some users reimagined them as a real girl group named "Obsession," turning the campaign into an internet meme, particularly on Threads.

== Content ==
The video was released on 26 June 2026, coinciding with the International Day Against Drug Abuse and Illicit Trafficking. It was published on social media platforms to discourage drug use.

In the first half, cocaine, cannabis, methamphetamine, and etomidate (known locally as "space oil") are personified as four female pop idols performing as a girl group. They describe the supposed "benefits" of drug use and conclude with the Cantonese line "Who wants to join us?"

The second half of the video presents the harmful consequences of drug use.

== Characters ==
The four drugs are personified as follows: cocaine as "Cola," cannabis as "Cho Cho" (Chinese: 草草, "Cho" means grass in Cantonese, which is the nickname of cannabis in Hong Kong), methamphetamine as "Bing Yi," (Chinese: 冰兒, "Bing" means ice in Cantonese, which is the nickname of methamphetamine) and etomidate as "Siu Jau" (Chinese: 小悠, "Jau" is the homophones of "Oil" (Chinese: 油) in Cantonese, which is taken from the nickname of etomidate - Space Oil).

They are depicted performing at a concert, singing lyrics that promote the effects of the drugs, including phrases such as "guarantee you feel so good your soul leaves your body," "With a romantic puff of smoke [from cannabis], only one stick will help you forget all worries. Very chilled," and "super dope."

In the latter half, the four female characters transform into unattractive male figures, symbolizing the consequences of drug abuse. A narrator then warns viewers not to be deceived by the "sugar-coated trap" of drugs.

== Controversy ==
Many Hong Kong netizens criticized the original version for resembling a drug advertisement, arguing that viewers who only watched the first half might be encouraged to use drugs. The promotional tone of the early segment led some to question how such content was approved for release by a government department.

Veteran journalist Lam Miu Yan commented that most viewers would not watch the full video, and that the first 35 seconds were overly detailed and appealing in presenting drugs, effectively turning it into unintended promotion.

The video was subsequently taken down. The revised "rapid reveal version" was also removed shortly after release due to a narration error stating that drug traffickers would not be imprisoned.

== Official response ==
Following the controversy, the CSD withdrew the video and re-released an edited version early on 27 June under the title "Collective Ideas, Relaunch, Tear Off the Sugar-Coating of Drugs Immediately!" The revised version was shortened from 62 seconds to 39 seconds, removing the introductory segment featuring the AI girl group.

The department stated that the video was produced using AI technology to appeal to young audiences and convey that drugs are "poison wrapped in sugar coating." It also noted that the production was handled internally without additional public expenditure.

Later that day, the revised version was again withdrawn, and the CSD issued a public apology for the presentation and production of the video. On 28 June, Senior Superintendent Ng Kei-hang acknowledged shortcomings in the project and stated that future productions would be handled more rigorously.

== Internet memes and derivative works ==
Despite being withdrawn, the four AI characters gained significant popularity online. They spread rapidly across platforms such as Facebook, Instagram, and especially Threads, where derivative works were particularly active.

Some netizens described the campaign as unintentionally successful marketing, noting that the characters became widely recognized within a single day. Users created edited images, memes, character profiles, messaging stickers, fan clubs, and YouTube videos, treating the group "Obsession" as if it were a real debuting girl group.

There was speculation that the appearance of the character "Cho Cho" was based on Miss Hong Kong Pageant runner-up Celina Harto. Wordplay based on the character’s name also became popular in memes.

The strong contrast and absurdity of the campaign contributed to its viral spread, attracting coverage from international media outlets including Malay Mail.
