= Anónimo Consejo =

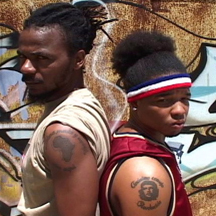
- Maigel Jaramillo and Yosmel Sarrias

Background information
- Origin: Cuba
- Genres: Hip hop

Anónimo Consejo was a Cuban rap duo whose name translates into English as Anonymous Advice. The group consisted of Maigel "MC Kokino" Entenza Jaramillo and Yosmel "MC Sekou" Sarrias, and was known for the social and political themes in their music. It was one of the most popular hip hop groups in Cuba during its prime. In 2011, the duo split to pursue individual interests.

Their material included some of the most politically edgy lyrics in all of Cuban music, but due to the Cuban government's unwillingness to support hip-hop the group was careful to restrain some of their lyrics. In fact, some of their songs were extremely pro-Cuban, a stance which got them a contract with a state run promotional company. Despite this, Jaramillo was once detained by Cuban police overnight shortly after a performance of their song "Las Apariencios Engañan'". Regardless of the groups’ criticisms of the Cuban government, Anónimo Consejo wished to gain success in Cuba without defecting and tried to remain true to their Cuban roots. Sarrias and Jaramillo were supporters of controversial men like Jose Marti and Che Guevara, both important figures in the Cuban Revolution.

Despite the recent influx of the reggaeton style in Cuba, the group remained strongly hip-hop in style, though collaborating with Puerto Rican reggaeton artist Tego Calderón on the song “Son Dos Alas”, appearing on the album The Underdog/El Subestimado, which emphasizes the connection between the two countries and the racial issues present in both nations.

The group was featured in Joshua Bee Alafia's 2004 documentary The Cuban Hip Hop All-Stars filmed in Havana, Cuba.
