= Abel Prieto =

Cuban politician

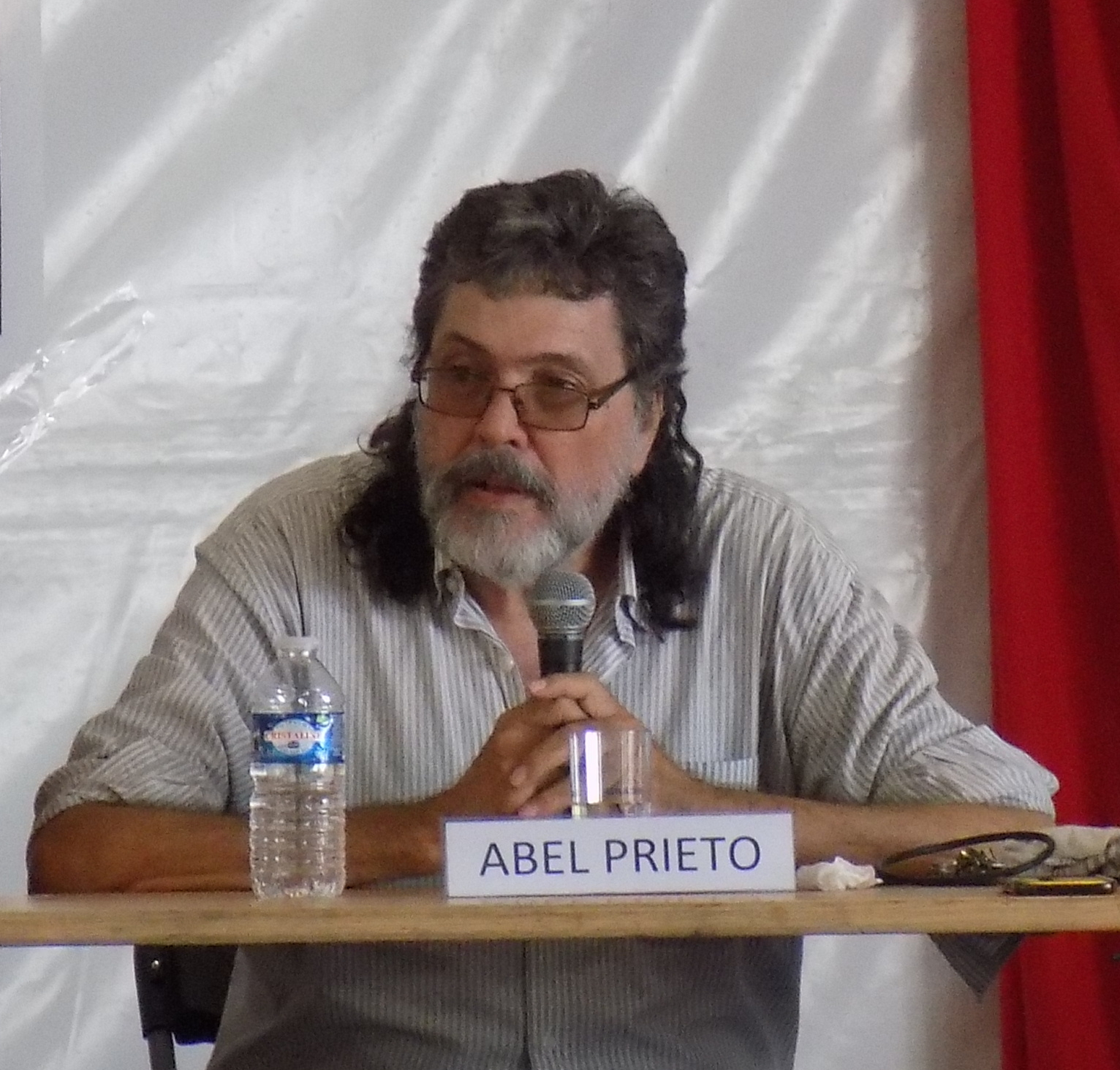

Abel Prieto Jiménez (born 11 November 1950) is a Cuban politician. Abelito, as he was called as a child, is the son of Abel Prieto, a Cuban educator who for several years pre and post Castro ran a preparatory school on Pinar Del Rio. From 1997 to 2012 and from 2016 to the present he has served as Minister of culture. In March 2012 he was appointed advisor to Cuban President Raúl Castro.

He is also a published author of fiction.

In his book Music and Revolution, Robin D. Moore says that, as minister of culture, Prieto "supported the greater international mobility of artists and extends them more autonomy in the licensing of their works abroad. He has stood up for the free circulation of controversial films such as Guantanamera and the creation of statues to figures such as John Lennon."

== See also ==
- Council of Ministers of Cuba
- Culture of Cuba

Political offices
Preceded by	Culture Minister of Cuba	Succeeded by incumbent
