= Obsession (book) =

1998 book by John E. Douglas and Mark Olshaker

- Author: John E. Douglas, Mark Olshaker
- Language: English
- Publisher: Scribner
- Publication date: 1998
- ISBN: 9780684845609

Obsession is a non-fiction book written by John E. Douglas and Mark Olshaker about the psyches of serial killers, serial rapists, mass murderers, stalkers, and their victims, as well as how to fight back.
