= Daniela Castillo =

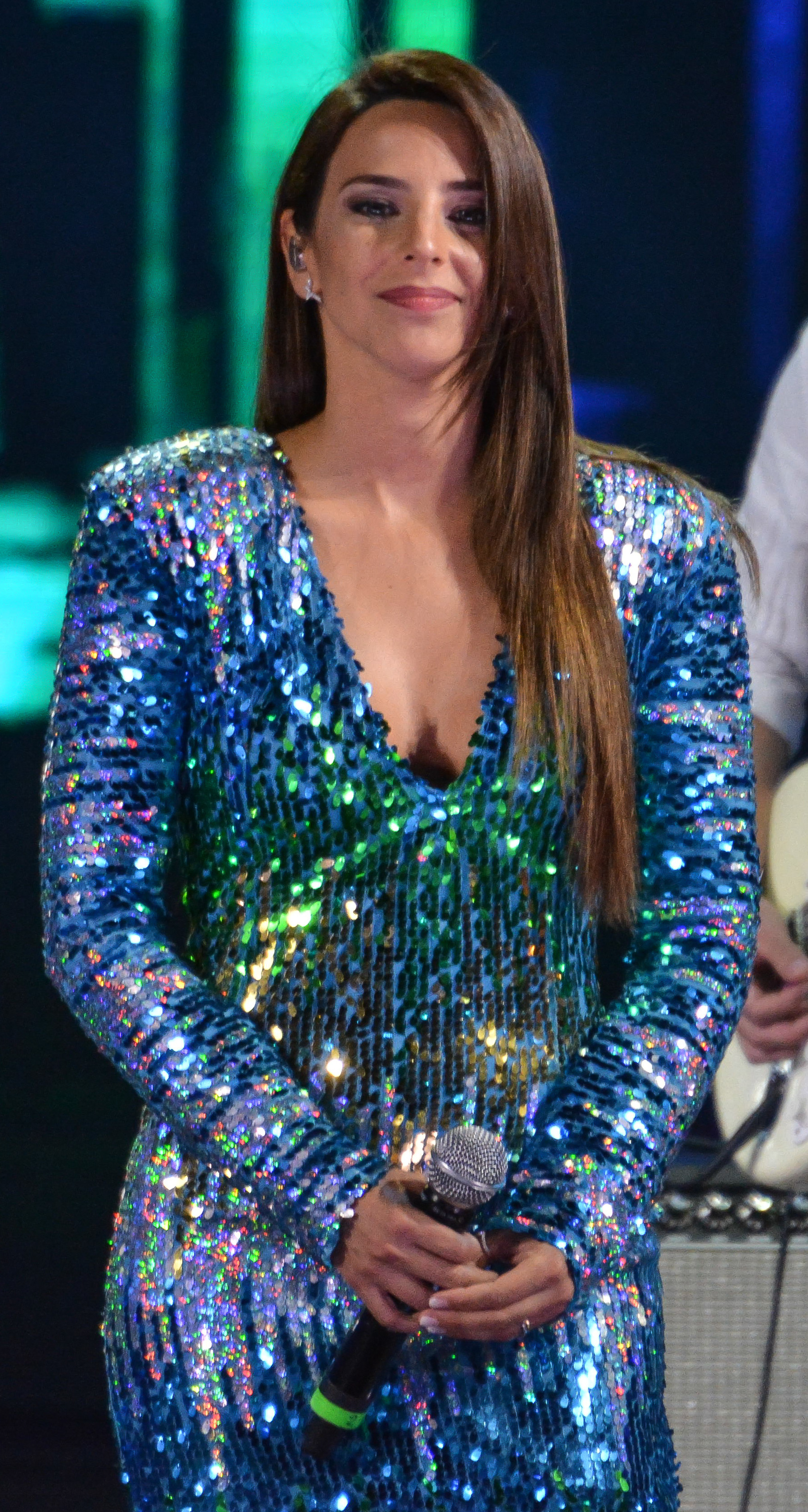

Background information
- Born: Daniela Paz Castillo Vicuña
- Origin: Santiago, Chile
- Genres: Pop, Rock
- Years active: 2002–present
- Label: Warner Music Group

Daniela Paz Castillo Vicuña (born September 26, 1984 in Santiago) is a Chilean female pop singer and actress born in Santiago. She debuted in 2002 as a solo artist on the Chilean TV show Rojo: Fama Contra Fama. She studied four years at the Alicia Puccio Academy where she met the casting crew for the TV show Rojo. Although she did not win first place in the singer talent contest, she became very popular due to her voice.

She released her first studio album on November 23, 2003 entitled Daniela Castillo under the Warner label. The album was a success, achieving triple Gold and double Platinum certification in Chile.

In July 2006, she starred in the movie Rojo: La Película, which was released in Chile. The movie follows characters played by her and other fellow members of the show, trying to achieve their dream in the music industry.

She released her second album Obsesión on November 28, 2006, which was certified Gold in Chile.

She participated in the second season of Estrellas en el Hielo in 2008.

== Discography ==
=== Albums ===
Year	Title	Chart		Certifications (sales thresholds)
Year	Title	CHL	MEX	Certifications (sales thresholds)
2003	Daniela Castillo: First studio album; Released: November 23, 2003	2	—	CHL: 3× Gold / 2× Platinum
2006	Obsesión: Second studio album; Released: November 28, 2006	12	—	CHL: Gold
2011	Invencible: Third studio album; Released: June, 2011	-	—	

=== Singles ===
- "Tú Volverás" (2003)
- "Trampa de Cristal" (2004)
- "Encontrarás" (2004)
- "Dueña de mi Corazón" (2005)
- "Volver a Respirar" (2005)
- "Volar" (2006)
- "Obsesión" (2007)
- "Invencible" (2011)
