= Krudas Cubensi =

Cuban activist hip-hop group

- Origin: Havana, Cuba
- Genres: Hip-hop music, dancehall, cumbia, funk, spoken word, rap
- Years active: 1999–present
- Members: Odaymar Cuesta (Pasa Kruda); Olikude Prendes (Pelusa Kruda)
- Website: Official website

Krudas Cubensi, also known as Las Krudas, is an activist hip-hop group with black feminist, queer and vegan politics. Born in Cuba in the 1990s, it is part of the Caribbean diaspora in the United States since 2006. They are now called Krudxs Cubensi, to reflect their non-binary identity.

== History ==
=== Group formation (1996-1999) ===
The three original members of Krudas Cubensi began working together in Havana in the 1990s. In 1996, before officially joining the Cuban hip hop scene, Odaymar Cuesta and Oli Prendes started the street theatre group Tropazancos Cubensi in collaboration with other Cuban artists. Odaymar’s sister, Odalys Cuesta, joined the collective in 1998. Mixing community theatre, rap, and visual arts, Tropazancos was an educational and experimental performance group.

=== Early work as Krudas Cubensi (1999-2006) ===
After performing at the annual rap festival of Alamar, a Havana district known for its importance in the Cuban hip-hop movement, Odaymar, Oli and Odalys decided to shift gear in their art activism. Krudas Cubensi emerged in 1999 as a response to what the group considered a huge lack of representation of women in the movement: The three artists wished to “incorporate a feminist discourse to the unrestrained posture of the masculine majority.”

Their first non-Tropazancos performance took place in 2000 at a Havana hip-hop festival. Because of their artistic work in the previous years, the members of Krudas Cubensi were already known by influential artists and producers in the underground hip-hop movement when they started rapping as Las Krudas.

In 2005, Krudas Cubensi participated in the birth of the female rap collective Omega Kilay with artists such as Danay Suarez, wishing again to circumvent the lack of representation of women inside Havana's music scene.

As their popularity grew, Krudas Cubensi members started receiving invitations to perform at music festivals abroad but their travel requests were always rejected by the Cuban government.

=== Immigration to the United States and touring (2006-present) ===
Wishing to share with activists outside of Cuba more freely, the group moved to the United States in 2006 by crossing the Mexico–United States border using the Wet feet, dry feet policy. The group's decision to leave Cuba was motivated by its desire to fight for social justice in other parts of the world, especially in terms of bringing awareness to the isolation of Black Latina and Caribbean lesbians.

Since 2006, Krudas Cubensi has toured the U.S. and Mexico, as well as other Latin American countries such as Colombia and Guatemala, performing and giving workshops in the different communities they visit. The Cuban musicians’ fans are spread out all over the world. In 2021 they began working with Grammy nominated producer, Greg Landau on a new project that combines their Hip Hop roots with Afro-Cuban rhythms and an all star crew of San Francisco Bay rea musicians, including Karl Perrazp, Santana timbalero and Cuban pianist Omar Sosa.

Odaymar and Olikude live in Oakland, California.

== Musical style and activism ==
The artists explain the name of the group by saying it means “the raw ones native from Cuba and the Caribbean representing in the world.” The trio formed with the goal of adding “rawness” to Cuban hip-hop, inspired by natural sounds more than refined and harmonious beats.

From the onset, Krudas Cubensi has tied activism to music and performance. Identifying as “Afro-Latin, queer, vegan, hip-hop artists in the U.S.,” the musicians root their work at the intersection of their identities, believing in the connection of art and activism in the struggle for social justice.

First in Cuba and now as part of the Cuban diaspora in the United States, the group puts social issues at the heart of all lyrics and performances, speaking of feminism, patriarchy and machismo, racism, homophobia and lesbophobia, classism, veganism, agism, etc. The duo of poets produces what they call “conscious music,” seeking to promote and defend the experiences of “womyn, immigrants, queers and people of color.”

Their work centers on music but is also about sharing knowledge with the different audiences, groups and individuals they encounter while touring, for example regarding the acceptance of body and gender nonconformity, and addresses topics such as body hair and menstruation, as in the song “120 horas rojas,” an ode to women's periods.

== Members ==
- Odaymar Cuesta (Pasa Kruda) — (1999–present)
- Olikrude/Oli Prendes (Pelusa Kruda) — (1999–present)
- Odalys Cuesta (Wanda Kruda) — (1999–2010)

== Discography ==
Krudas Cubensi albums

- Cubensi Hip Hop (2003)
- Kandela (2005)
- Resistiendo (2007)
- Krudas Compilación (2009)
- Levántate (2012)
- Poderosxs (2014)
- Highly Addictive (2016)
- "“They/them, les elles” (2023)

Outerspaces Crew

- Power in the Margins (2014)

== Other project: OREMI ==
In 2005, the Cuban National Center for Sex Education (CENESEX) asked the group members to be co-founders of the first lesbian group supported by the state, Grupo OREMI. They were approached because of their activism for LGBT rights in Cuba.
