= Obsesión (Cuban band) =

Obsesion
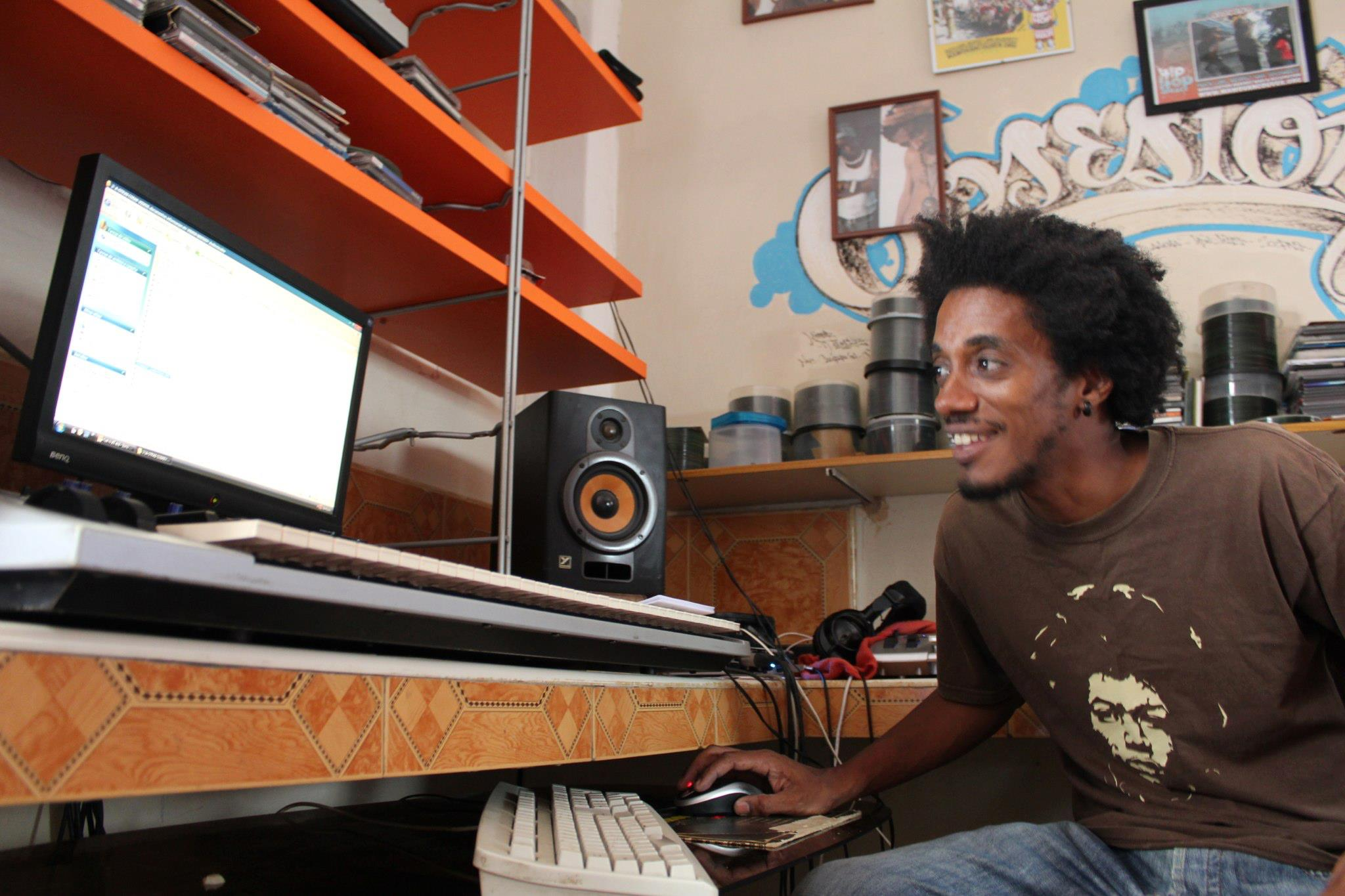

Background information
- Origin: Havana, Cuba
- Genres: Hip hop
- Years active: 1996–present

Obsesión is a hip-hop duo consisting of Alexey Rodriguez, Isnay Rodriguez, and Magia Lopez. They have been writing and playing music since 1996 and are considered to be one of the most notable groups of the hip hop movement in Cuba. They live and work in Regla, an industrial suburb east of Havana, Cuba.

== History ==
Alexey had been a breakdancer and a fan of U.S. hip-hop. He worked as a lathe operator and sculptor when, in 1993, he met Magia. She had spent four years performing with an Afro-Cuban dance troupe and had earned a communications degree before she too became a sculptor.

In 2003, they embarked on a month-long tour of the United States, culminating in a historical performance at the Apollo Theatre, sharing the stage with The Roots, with a fan base including Harry Belafonte, Afrika Bambaata and Mos Def.

In 2006, they attended the World Social Forum in Venezuela and performed at the Festival of Hip-Hop to Fight Against Aids. In 2011, the band released the album El Disco Negro de Obsesión, in MP3 format and in a singular and creative physical edition. In 2011 the group also won an award in the Cuban “Lucas” music video clip competition and another one at the Cubadisco awards in the category of rap music for their new recording El Disco Negro. This is the second year that they won in Cubadisco’s rap category.

== Members ==
- Alexey Rodriguez
- Magia Lopez
- Isnay Rodriguez (DJ El Jigue)
