= Women in the Caribbean =

Females from the Caribbean region

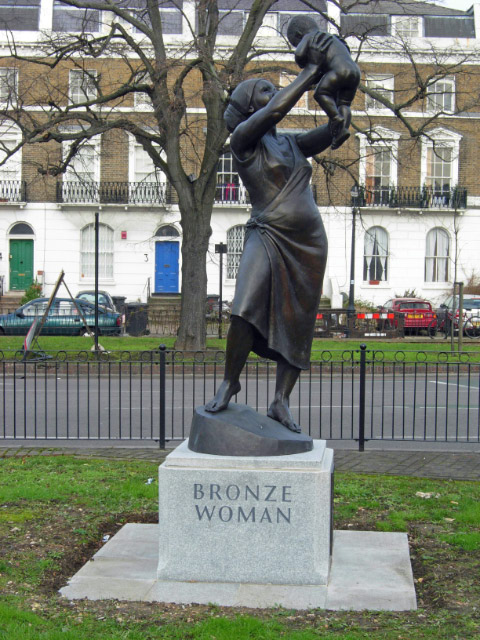
Bronze Woman, a statue in Stockwell Memorial Gardens in the London Borough of Lambeth. It was designed by Ian Walters and completed, following his death, by Aleix Barbat. It was inspired by a poem written by local resident Cecile Nobrega and honors women of the Caribbean community. It was unveiled in October 2008.

Women in the Caribbean are women who were born in, who live in, or are from the region of the Caribbean in the Americas. Historically, Caribbean women have been significant contributors to the economy and the "domestic sphere" of the Caribbean region since the time of slavery, during the time of "free labor forces" in the late 19th and 20th centuries, as well as during the time of "contemporary politics" and economics. Their position and status may vary "among Caribbean societies", cultural groups, and geographical locations, that have different language backgrounds which include English-, Spanish-, and French-speaking communities in the West Indies.

Women in The Caribbean Project (WICP) is a project that identifies personalized social realities that women are challenged with. The main focus is to analyze how these realities came to be and the consequences they have on the individual and community as social change occur (Massiah, 1986).

== Sex-role and Self-perception ==
Women in the Caribbean's role as child-bearer and nurture extended to the dual role. Women's role has resulted in the addition of instrumental tasks. Women were obligated to maintain the duties of the household due to the increase in male emigration towards the end of the century of slavery (Anderson 1986). Because of WWII, the economy had an unexpected change. During this time there was a need for more workers, specifically one who acquired a higher education. This resulted in an increase in female workers and the structure of class started making its way through the cohort gender. Women seek work outside of the household, but their obligation at home was still the main priority. It is still a women's responsibility to ensure that their husband and children are well established before work outside is done. A woman having a child sensed to be one's source of identity. Having children gives a woman a feeling of fulfillment. To bear and raise children fills the emotional gap. When one is not able to bear a child, she will assist other parenting mothers. Once a mother, she is considered to be to some degree independent and responsible. Before World War II the correlation of having children and being thought highly begins in their own families. It Is then strengthen by outside experiences such as school systems. The school systems were based on the idea that women are the intellectual antithesis to men. As women seek work their value in the labor market decreases. The male role includes authority and power due to the fact of being an economic provider. Even though males have this status, by Caribbean women actively being the decision-maker when it comes to familial roles and their income earned outside of the home, these women attribute to leadership. When male figures are absent, women are responsible for taking the full role of the household; including the roles assigned to the man.

== Haitian women in the Caribbean ==
The class structure in Haiti is divided into distinct castes rather than classes. The kinship system and its values differentiate depending on social class (Allman & Allman 1987). The urban, educated, French-speakers differ from the rural and newly arrived migrants living in Port-au-Prince. Family patterns differ between urban and rural areas. In rural areas, the patterns of families are related to lacou; meaning courtyard. Large groups of kins living together around a central court. Each extended family would live in their caille, but the compound was connected through communal working and under the authority of a patriarch. This system was the main structure until the 20th century. This was created when the socio-economic system was broken up after independence of 1804 and plantations were given to peasants. In urban areas, the families are of a small minority of upper-class Haitians. The middle and lower-middle-class Haitians have family patterns of French orientation. Haitian women play a large role in the economy. They are often running households without the help of a father. Many live alone without a husband with their children and other relatives. Peasant women are responsible for selling the produce of the land. They also buy items in urban areas for families. The women are constantly traveling to markets, at times the distances are far. and petty retailing. Urban Haitian women are workers in assembly factories. The economic responsibility gives high independence and sometimes can lead to them to be of equal power to the working men. Haitian women's status is higher in rural areas within the lower urban classes; whereas status is lower in the middle classes. In the Haitian society, men and women are relatively equal when it comes to earning money, economic activities and household duties. Haitian women are able to support and care for their children for a long period of time with very little help form men.

== See also ==
- Women in the Americas
- Women in Cuba
- Women in the Dominican Republic
- Women in Guyana
- Women in Haiti
- Women in Suriname
- Women in Trinidad and Tobago
- Women in the British Virgin Islands
- Women in Puerto Rico
- Women in the United States Virgin Islands
