= Women in the British Virgin Islands =

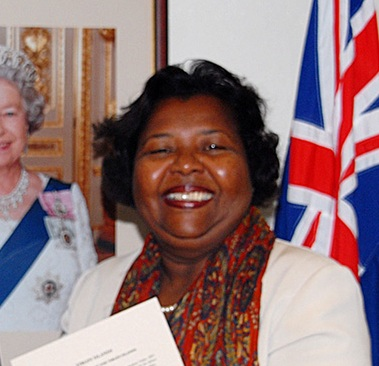
Dancia Penn, a female politician shown here when she was sworn in as Deputy Premier of the British Virgin Islands in 2007.

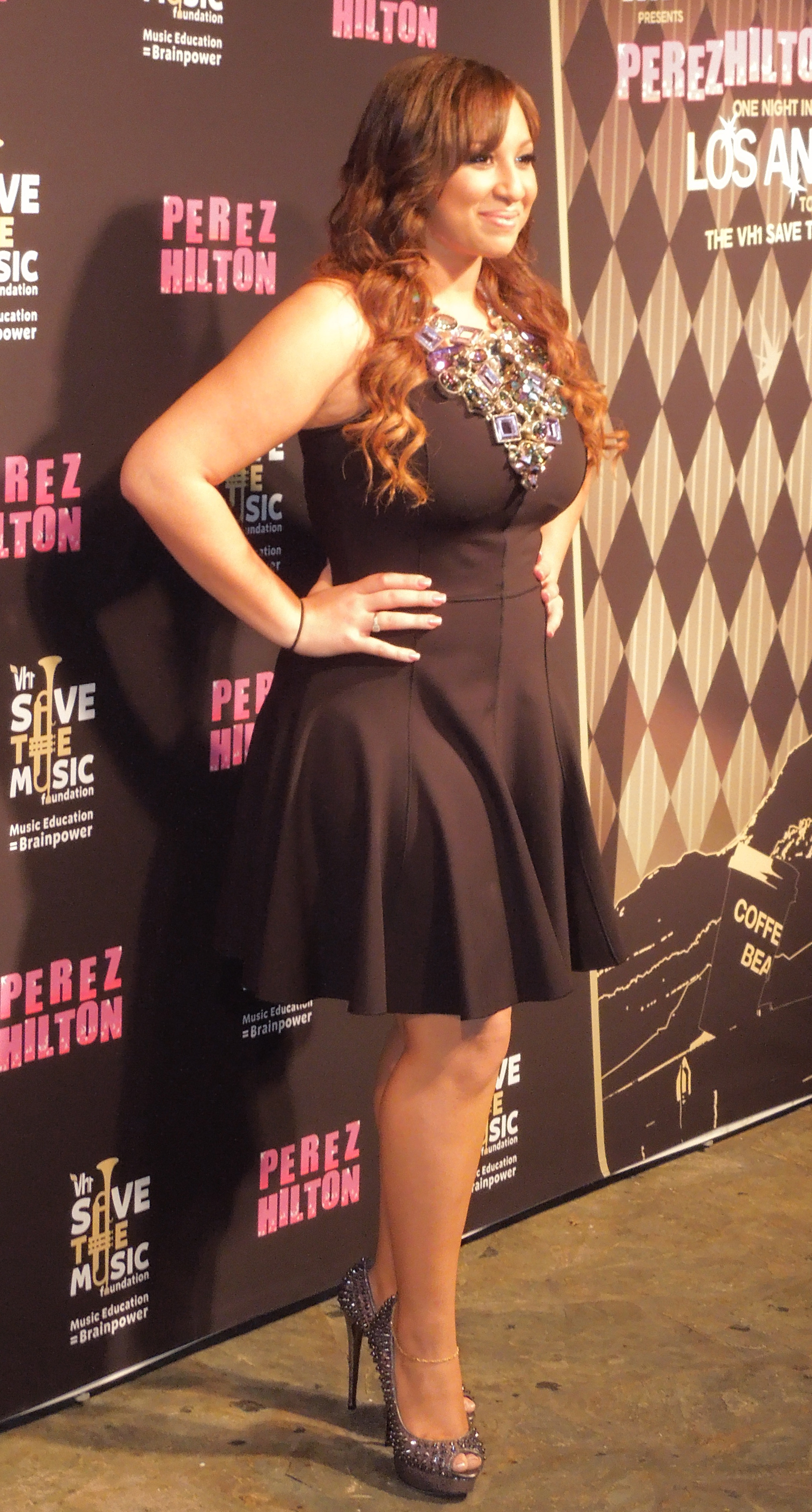
Melanie Amaro, a female vocalist from the British Virgin Islands, and winner of the first season of X-Factor, posing for press cameras in 2012.

Women in the British Virgin Islands are women who were born in, who live in, and are from the British Virgin Islands, a British overseas territory located in the Caribbean. According to Countries and Their Culture, women of the British Virgin Islands are characteristically with "strong independent and entrepreneurial spirit".

== Responsibilities ==
Traditionally, women share household responsibilities with their male counterparts. In general, BVI women take care of chores such as "gardening, cooking, sewing, and keeping household accounts". In modern-day British Virgin Islands, women occupy major positions in the fields of education and civil service. Some women from other regions of the Caribbean who live in the British Virgin Islands may be working as "service workers" and can be found occupying jobs such as "clerks, secretaries, housekeepers, and waitresses". Women participate in church activities. As part of their contribution to the community, women contribute their skills and knowledge in the fields of education and in community festivals. Women can vote when they reach 18 years old.

== Women's welfare ==
An office known as the Woman's Desk, a part of the Office of the Chief Minister, was established during the early part of the 1990s in order to provide "educational and intervention programs" that handle issues related to "women's health and domestic violence".

== See also ==
- List of British Virgin Islanders
- List of British Virgin Islands-related topics
- Culture of the Virgin Islands
- Human rights in the British Virgin Islands
- Women's suffrage in the United Kingdom
- Women in the Caribbean
- Women in the Americas
- Women in the United States Virgin Islands
