= Women in the Americas =

Women born in and living in North or South America

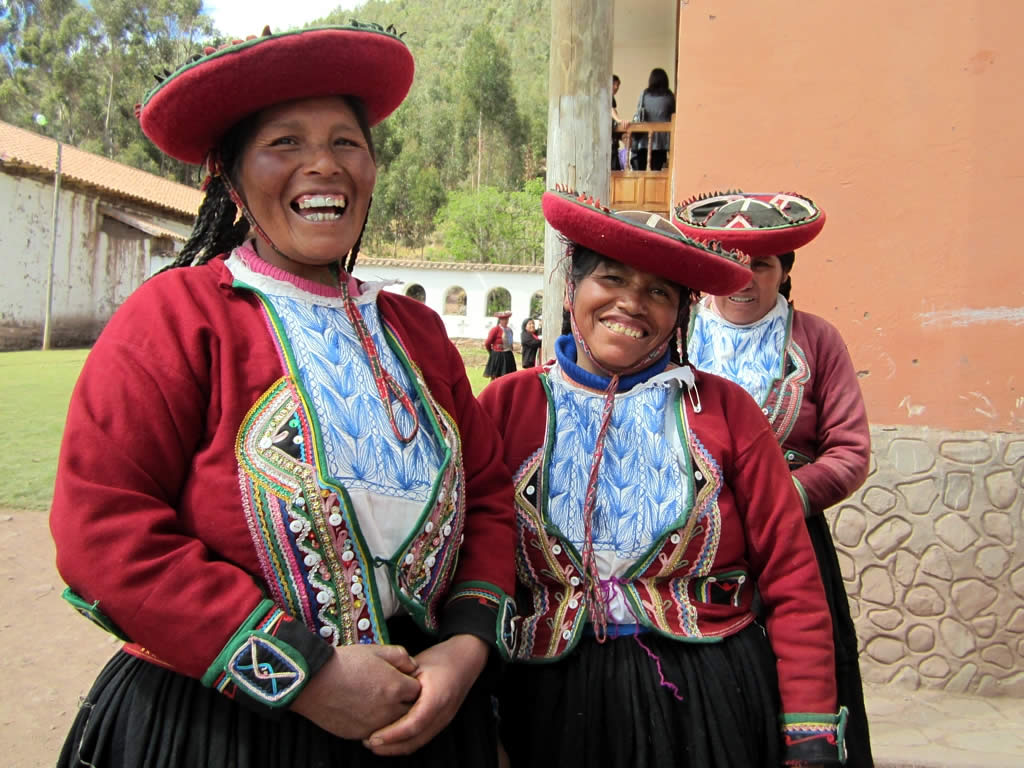
Local women at Umasbamba village, Chincheros District, Peru, in 2012

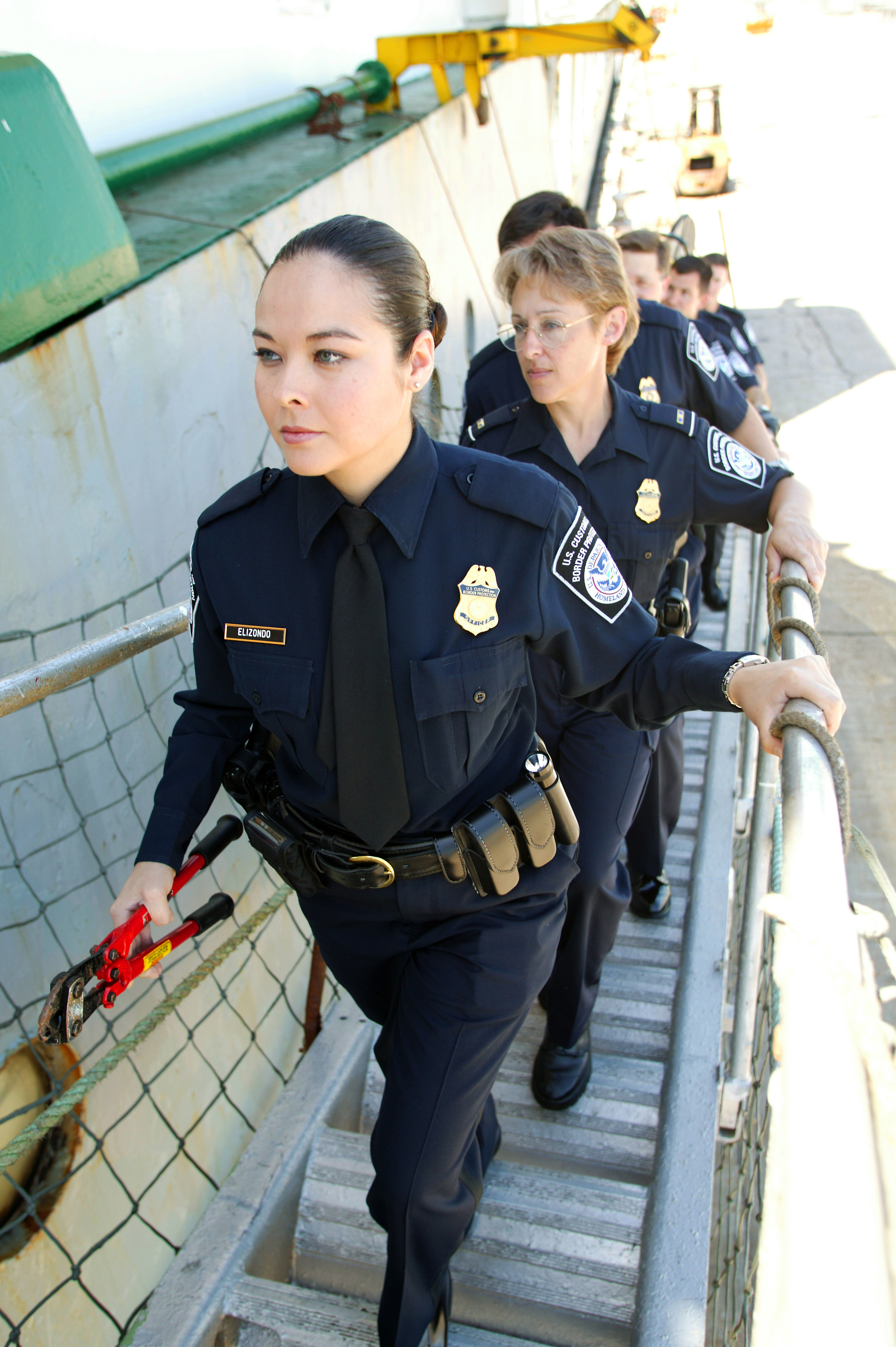
Female law enforcement officers in the United States of America.

Women in the Americas are women who were born in, who live in, and are from the Americas, a regional area which encompasses the Caribbean region, Central America or Middle America, North America and South America. Their evolution, culture and history coincide with the history of the Americas, though often the experiences of women were different than those of male members of society. The differences in women's experiences often had to do with division of labor or constraints placed on them due to traditional roles in society. The effects of slavery, bondage and colonization has had a profound effect on women in the Americas over time.

Society for the History of Women in the Americas (SHAW), is a British organization that studies women's history in context of their connection to the Americas. Studying women's history allows for the restoration of lost information about how women lived, worked and participated in their cultures. Looking at women's history through the lens of a shared geography and culture allows useful comparisons of women's lives in the Americas without nationalism clouding the narrative.

== History ==
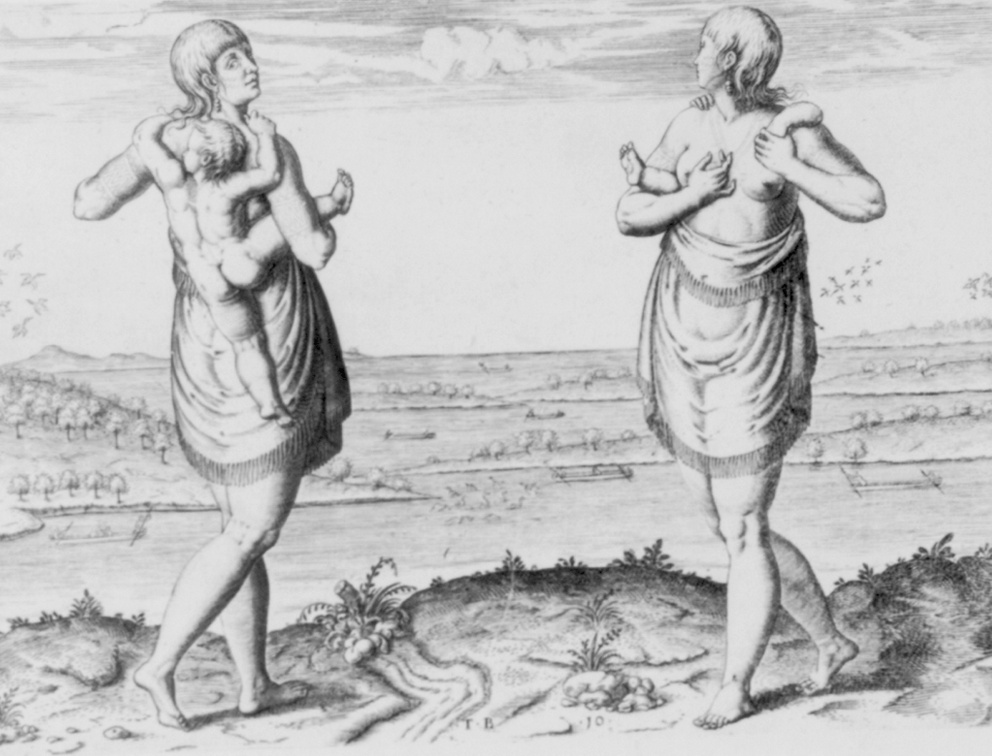
Full-length, front and back portraits of a native woman from Dasamonquepeio of the Americas showing manner of dress and way of carrying a child on her back; view of river and landscape in the background, (1590)

=== Prehistory ===
Women in the Americas or the women who now populate what is known as North America, Central America, the Caribbean and South America arrived via migration. Many origin stories of the Native peoples who populated the Americas contain themes of the people arriving via another place, whether that is from the ground or from waters, and journeying to their point of origin. The first historical evidence of people in the Americas from scientific study comes from mitochondrial DNA of Paleoindians who crossed the Bering Land Bridge from Beringia into the area now known as Alaska around 13,000 years ago. From the north, migrants from Beringia traveled to the south and from there branched from the west coast toward the east. Initially both men and women were involved in hunting and gathering, as survival depended on all members of society working together. Gathering and storing food, making shelter and clothing to survive harsh northern climates, required multiple skills. Though it is impossible to determine exactly what the division of labor was for early people, it is clear that adaptations were made by migrants to adjust to changing situations. Early archaeology focused on the importance of big game hunting as a survival strategy for Paleoindians, but newer research indicates that a more reliable strategy was more likely centered on gathering activities of women and children. As tools were developed, specific tasks may have taken on gendered aspects, possibly based upon negotiated roles, age, or preferences. When farming emerged in the Archaic period (8000 to 3000 B.C.E.), and a shift from procuring food from available sources was made, societies were transformed toward more settled communities often developing social classes, trade and economic specialization of labor. Archaeological records indicate that women "played a strong role in this transition" throughout the Americas and the activities of women in the creation and use of stone tools is evidenced in the period. Burial records during the archaic period do not reveal much about status differences between women and men but confirm that they performed separate tasks.

By the Formative stage, (sometimes called the Preclassic Era, which varies by region but typically spans from 3000 B.C.E. to 150 C.E.), women had become key figures in rituals and belief systems. Figurines from throughout the Americas, including the Caribbean region, depict women in postures of respect demonstrating power and prestige and participating in varied economic, political, religious and social activities. In the Classic stage and Post-Classic stage, the developmental eras between the Formative and Colonization, imagery on Mayan pottery reveals women were depicted as deities in ritual practices and that their primary roles revolved around cooking, food preparation and clothing manufacture. In South America, the Classic stage is used to describe the period of settled, urban dwelling similar in structure to those found in Mesoamerica. During the same time-frame, in North America, studies confirm that there was no uniform practice toward women or their place in society. In some matrilineal societies, women were assigned specific roles in the ceremonial, economic and political customs of their societies. In some patrilineal groups, women gained prestige from their relationships with men but were allowed to own their own property and were honored for their participation in crafts and ceremonial functions. In ambilineal societies, women were allowed to own property, be recognized in political roles, and act in both economic and ritual capacities. Most Native cultures did not have hierarchical power structures where influence or authority was held by only one gender. Women were active both creating society and in leadership roles in this period; however, that changed. As societies in the Americas developed, the commitment to maize growing expanded throughout the region. By the time of contact with Europeans, most North American women were farmers, and had accepted supporting roles to their men, who performed hunting, trade, and diplomatic functions.

=== European contact and colonization ===
Conquest by and contact with Europeans brought extreme changes to all of the inhabitants of the Americas. Disease and a lack of immunity to African and European diseases killed more than 80% of the Native population of the Americas within the first two centuries of the Colonial period. The main European groups which colonized and fought over control of the region included the Dutch, English, French, Portuguese, and Spanish. They established economic systems which benefited themselves, taking land and resources, as well as requiring labor from native peoples or importing slaves. Though bondage had existed among native cultures, captives or slaves were treated as pawns to be used in diplomatic relations, for resolving disputes, to right wrongs, or as punishment for crimes and often had multiple functions, as laborers, prisoners, or property. The majority of captives were women, as they could be used as negotiators and also to replenish declining populations of either their own culture or their captor's culture. Though the result of the conquest varied because both the native cultures and the various European groups differed, male-female relationships were significantly altered by contact. French, Portuguese and Spanish colonizers brought Catholic religious beliefs to Latin America and North America, which imposed the subordination of women to male authority and removed women from ceremonial rites. Dutch and English colonizers brought predominantly Protestant indoctrination to native peoples with its male-dominated views of both gender roles and sexuality.

Exploitation of South America and the Caribbean preceded that of the North American continent. In the earliest period, individuals were put ashore to explore areas, learn the language and customs and prepare to be translators and guides for later expeditioners. These explorers were encouraged to intermarry with indigenous women to strengthen and legitimize claims of power and territory. Violent contact followed, wherein indigenous people resisted and were either subjugated or brought to extinction by adventurers seeking riches and glory. Church functionaries were brought with troops to serve as administrators to the crown and serve as social control agents. Spanish and Portuguese missionaries strongly opposed sexual behaviors, including adultery, polygamy, premarital sex, as well as nudity, which were tolerated by some native populations. They sought to have women cover themselves, accept Christian marriage and become maternal, domestic caretakers and yet at the same time, the invading military forces sexually abused and seized women forcing them into concubinage. Equally, officially hostile to Two-Spirit sexual practices, Europeans used gender-variant native people to service their own needs. Violence was tolerated, and in some instances encouraged by priests, to tame women, keep them from sin, and to keep them obedient to their husbands. Iberian women did not arrive in the New World until battles had been won and towns and cities had been established. Thirty Spanish women were allowed to participate in Columbus' third voyage of 1498 if they were willing to become permanent inhabitants of the Spanish colony. The intent of allowing women passage was that they would marry and bring morality to the colonies, as well as being able to convince other high-born women of the wealth to be had by emigration. Spain's intent was to integrate the people they conquered into Spanish society and impose Iberian cultural and religious beliefs upon their new territories. Sometimes indigenous cultures would facilitate integration, such as the Inca in Peru who gave Incan women to the Spanish men as gifts and brides.

The entry of Europeans into North America followed a similar pattern to early exploration period in South America. Individuals or small bands of soldiers were sent to areas along the Gulf and southeastern coast of America on expeditions of discovery. The soldiers demanded food, laborers to help them carry their goods, and women, who they used for cooking and sex. To the north, solitary French explorers and trappers moved into Canada and were followed by missionaries. No large-scale colonization effort was made, as native women were exploited to increase the population, but in the 1660s France did send about 850 young women (single or widowed) called King's Daughters ("filles du roi") to Canada. They quickly found husbands among the predominantly male settlers, as well as a new life for themselves. They came mostly from poor families in the Paris area, Normandy and the central-western regions of France. A handful were ex-prostitutes, but only one is known to have practiced that trade in Canada.

The Dutch and English colonization efforts were begun as a marriage between settlement and commerce. Dutch exploration began when the Dutch East India Company hired Henry Hudson in 1609 to discover a shipping route to Asia. Though the Northwest Passage was not discovered, involvement in the fur trade soon commenced and the colony of New Netherland was established. As the colony was a business venture, the directors weighed the profitability of expanding settlement against possible returns to be gleaned from the commercial possibilities and sold provisional orders for colonization to families. The policy ensured that women were part of the colonizing effort from conception and that the company valued the complementary roles that men and women would provide to growth of the colony. The first English settlers were not farmers, or familiar with the woodlands, but rather primarily townsfolk and city dwellers. A year after the founding of Jamestown, the first two women arrived at the settlement in 1608 and were followed the next year with approximately 120 more women, who were either wives and fiancées of previous settlers or were hired by the Virginia Company to help establish the colony. With the establishment of settlements, the Atlantic slave trade was introduced and in fact, until 1800, the majority of women who arrived in the Americas were not free migrants, but rather arrived as slaves. Estimates are that four-fifths of all women who came to the Americas before 1800 were not European women.

=== Bondage and women in the Americas ===
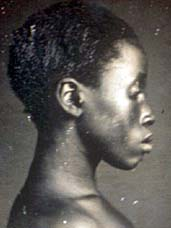
Daguerreotype of Delia, a slave woman on a plantation in Columbia, South Carolina. Delia was an American-born slave, daughter of Congo-born slave "Renty". (circa 1850–1853)

Africans, Native Americans and Europeans all were part of the slave trade in early modern North America. Throughout the Americas, bondage existed—in warmer climates, where plantation systems developed, or in the northern areas, where women were either transported as criminals or worked as indentured servants. As early as the 1530s, Portugal began using slave labor in Brazil to work sugarcane plantations. Initially, the Portuguese used indigenous people as slaves, but in 1574, the crown decreed that unless the native people were cannibals, already slaves, or were spoils of a "just war", they could not be enslaved. The Spanish also used native people as forced labor, but because under the encomienda system, neither the estate nor the indios were an inheritable asset, it differed from slavery, which was abolished in Spanish colonies in 1542. When the Dutch took over Brazilian sugar concerns in the early 17th century, they not only continued importing Africans for slave labor, but became instrumental in spreading sugar production throughout the Caribbean. A Dutch-trained Englishman, John Drax, modified farming methods used in Brazil to fit a small island model in Barbados in the mid-1650s, establishing that the Caribbean islands could supply sufficient goods for Amsterdam's refineries. During the same time frame, both France and England began using slavery in the West Indies. By the 1620s, the British began to expand into the Caribbean, taking former Spanish holdings. Initially the islands were planned to be settled by small farmers growing crops for export to England. Fairly quickly, as sugar was more profitable, small farmers were pushed out and plantation economies were developed.

As indigenous labor on haciendas and ranches in the Spanish territories encompassed all of the indios within the confines of the estate, native women worked tending to children, the sick, and as cooks, but gendered tasks were often blurred and they worked in fields and tended to livestock as well. In areas in which the encomendero used his indios for mining, entire families participated. Church authorities in areas in which indigenous people and non-natives mingled, were prone to accuse natives of practicing witchcraft and Inquisitional auto-da-fés or torture were used to spur conversion to Catholicism. Women and children made up the majority of African slaves sent to the Americas, regardless of whether their labor was as northern domestics or southern field labor Slave women made up a large percentage of the workers on Caribbean sugarcane, indigo and coffee farms and were employed in all tasks not deemed as "skilled labor", including working as house servants, preparing fields for planting, planting indigo or coffee seeds, cutting cane and feeding the cuttings into the mill, or performing corvée labor. Women were also highly valued for their reproductive ability. African women who were enslaved and brought to the Americas were used to produce more slaves and were also exploited as sexual objects. In popular culture, they were depicted as monstrosities. Such depictions led Europeans to falsely assume that they could not feel pain, even in childbirth. After 1650, slavery in the Americas was increasingly tied to one's race, with women of color being defined as slaves who would have an indefinite period of service. Though initially indigenous people used female slaves as manual laborer, currency in diplomatic alliances and as sexual objects, as the plantation economy grew, tribes in the southeastern United States adapted the way they used slavery to fit the European model. Emulating and competing in the commerce systems of the white settlers, the Five Civilized Tribes not only used slave labor on their plantations in the South, but also transported the practice to the plains in the 1830s, when they were removed to Indian Territory, in present-day Oklahoma.

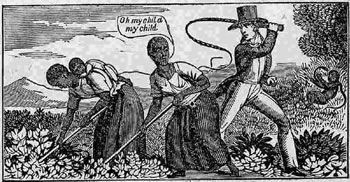
Anti-slavery engraving from the American Anti-Slavery Almanac, 1840

Beginning in the late 16th century, Britain used its New World colonies as a place to transport criminals. Few systematic studies have been done on women who were transported; however, records on overall transports reveal that in the early period of the practice, many prisoners were political dissidents. They may have been shipped to Barbados, Jamaica, the Leeward Islands or to the continent. The practice increased after the passage of the Transportation Act 1717, and estimates are that somewhere between 5,000 and 10,000 women were sent between 1718 and 1776 to the Americas. Transports' sentences could range from seven years for committing petty crimes, usually thefts of under one shilling, to fourteen years for felonies to life for pardoned felons, who had been convicted of capital crimes. In popular culture, which early historians repeated as fact, many female transports were thought to be prostitutes. While there may have been commercial sex workers among transportees, since if charged with multiple crimes women were rarely tried for solicitation, there were no convictions for prostitution at Old Bailey during the period. As young women moved to English cities to find work, prosecutions of women surged, as authorities feared that women living alone would abandon their feminine natures and their families and take up unnatural behaviors, including cross-dressing and other immoral acts. Records from Old Bailey indicate that women made up the majority of prosecutions in London and that the majority of their convictions were from theft of household goods or clothing and typically items were stolen from an employer. The profile of women transportees was a young woman between 15 and 30 years old, who was employed in domestic work. Rarely did they steal at the direction of men, as was formerly assumed, but rather acted as independent agents or if their actions were group activities, the group was made up of other women. After waiting for months, or even years in a British prison, transportees were loaded onto convict ships and sent abroad, often becoming mistresses or unwilling sexual partners to sailors during the voyage. Their labor was sold to cover the cost of their passage. In most instances, convict laborers were treated equally to slaves, but fear of contracting venereal diseases may have led convict women to be less sexually exploited than their African counterparts. Because of the social stigma of being a criminal, many convicted women returned to England after their sentences expired. The practice ended on continental North America with the outbreak of the American Revolution and a failed attempt at transporting convicts in 1789 to Newfoundland.

Indentured servitude was another form of bonded labor, in which the laborer could agree to work for a specified period in exchange for payment by the employer to the ship captain who had transported the worker. During the early part of the 17th century, women made up 1/6th of migrant contractors; by the 18th century, their numbers surged to between 33% and 50% of indentures. Typical women indentured servants were unmarried, orphaned girls, between fifteen and twenty-four years old. They were unable to marry without the consent of their employers and many times could not leave or purchase goods without their employer's approval. Often, women's compensation was poor and they could be punished by whippings, fines, or even branding for laziness, theft or escape attempts. Unlike slaves, indentured servants' period of labor ended at termination of their contracts. They were also allowed to sue employers for mistreatment and were required to be provided with a minimum level of food and clothing. Most women indentured servants during the colonial period were domestic workers and after completing their contracts, many married, though having lost up to eight years in servitude, they tended to have fewer children than other women in the period. Indentures declined during the period when convict labor surged, as transported convicts were paid lower wages, but indentures, particularly among Asian workers increased in the Caribbean after the abolition of slavery. Part of the decline might also be attributed to the shift to a redemptioner system in which instead of selling their labor to a guaranteed employment before they embarked, ship captains agreed to transport laborers and be reimbursed after arrival, selling contracts to the highest bidder. Change to the redemptioner system meant that families could immigrate together and increased German and Scotch-Irish immigration.

When slavery was abolished and new means of cheap labor were sought, crimping inducements soared in Chinese ports and officials were loath to allow females to emigrate. Similarly, Japanese influence in Korea, and the desire of the Japanese to keep Korean labor out of U.S. markets in Hawaii, spurred labor recruiters acting in Korea to contract with more than 1000 Korean laborers—196 single men and 257 families—to work in the henequen industry in Mexico's Yucatán Peninsula. Though some women were tricked into indenture agreements in the Caribbean, most voluntarily went because of poverty or social conditions. The numbers of Chinese women who migrated to Peru and Cuba remained relatively small, but some 250,000 Indian women agreed to indenture contracts, making up 40% of the Indian indentured laborers transported to the Caribbean. They encountered societal and family oppression, poverty, lack of power, sexual abuse and violence during their indenture, but most remained after their contracts were completed. Indentured labor in the Americas did not cease until well into the 20th century with India ending the practice in 1916, Britain prohibiting its debt contracts the following year, Mexico terminating its hacienda system in 1917, and agrarian reform and revolution, which ended Peru's hacienda system in 1952 and Bolivia's in 1969.

=== Women and social movements in the Americas ===
Women in the United States were extremely active in the abolition movement. Women "were on the front lines, traveling the countryside--speaking on the issue of slavery" and were considered the "backbone" of the anti-slavery movement. Lucretia Mott and William Lloyd Garrison eventually founded the American Anti-Slavery Society and both were supportive of women being equal voices in the fight against slavery. Women such as Sarah McKim and Susanna Wright, were active in the Underground Railroad, helping slaves escape into freedom in the North. Involvement wasn't limited to white women, as black women and Native American women were also involved in helping slaves escape, speaking out about slavery, and protecting them. Christiana Carteaux Bannister helped shelter around one hundred slaves who came through Boston, and Harriet Tubman was well known for her involvement in the Underground Railroad, Sojourner Truth gave speeches about the ills of slavery, and women such as Cherokee Sally Johnson, tried to protect her husband who was an escaped slave by deeding him part of her land. The Tuscarora, Iroquois and Seminole were known to assist fugitives. For many women, the struggle for abolishing slavery brought about a desire to fight for their own rights. Recognition that they were unable to participate at the London Anti-Slavery Convention in a forum trying to promote rights for another group of people, led Elizabeth Cady Stanton and Lucretia Mott to hold the Seneca Falls Convention for women's rights in 1848.

In Latin America, the 19th century was a time of revolution with Nationalist movements and Independence Wars erupting throughout the Spanish colonies, many led by Simón Bolívar. Women were not simply spectators or support for men in the wars of Latin America, but took up arms, acted as spies and informants, organizers and nurses. In the Spanish Caribbean, though no armed rebellion took place, women collaborated with separatist groups and pressed for an end to slavery. Women's participation in the push for nationalism led the way to replacing the former trend for women to lead a life secluded from society to one of involvement and a push for more voice in social and political movements. In particular, women began organizing secondary schools for young women.

Another press for societal improvement, the Temperance movement, shows a marked difference between the Americas. In the United States and Canada, women flocked to the Woman's Christian Temperance Union (WCTU). It was the largest non-denominational women's organization in Canada during the 19th century, as abuse of alcohol was widely credited as the cause of disease, immorality, poverty, prostitution, unemployment and violence. The WCTU also was the largest women's organization in the United States and seen as an organization that could help women gain protection for themselves and their children from the violence they experienced and achieve social reforms. Temperance did not receive such enthusiastic support in Latin America, though some countries, like Mexico, did attempt to curtail consumption. For many women who had been confined to their homes, producing and selling alcohol, had been a means of both economic support and a way to participate in business ventures in an environment where women were usually barred from participation.

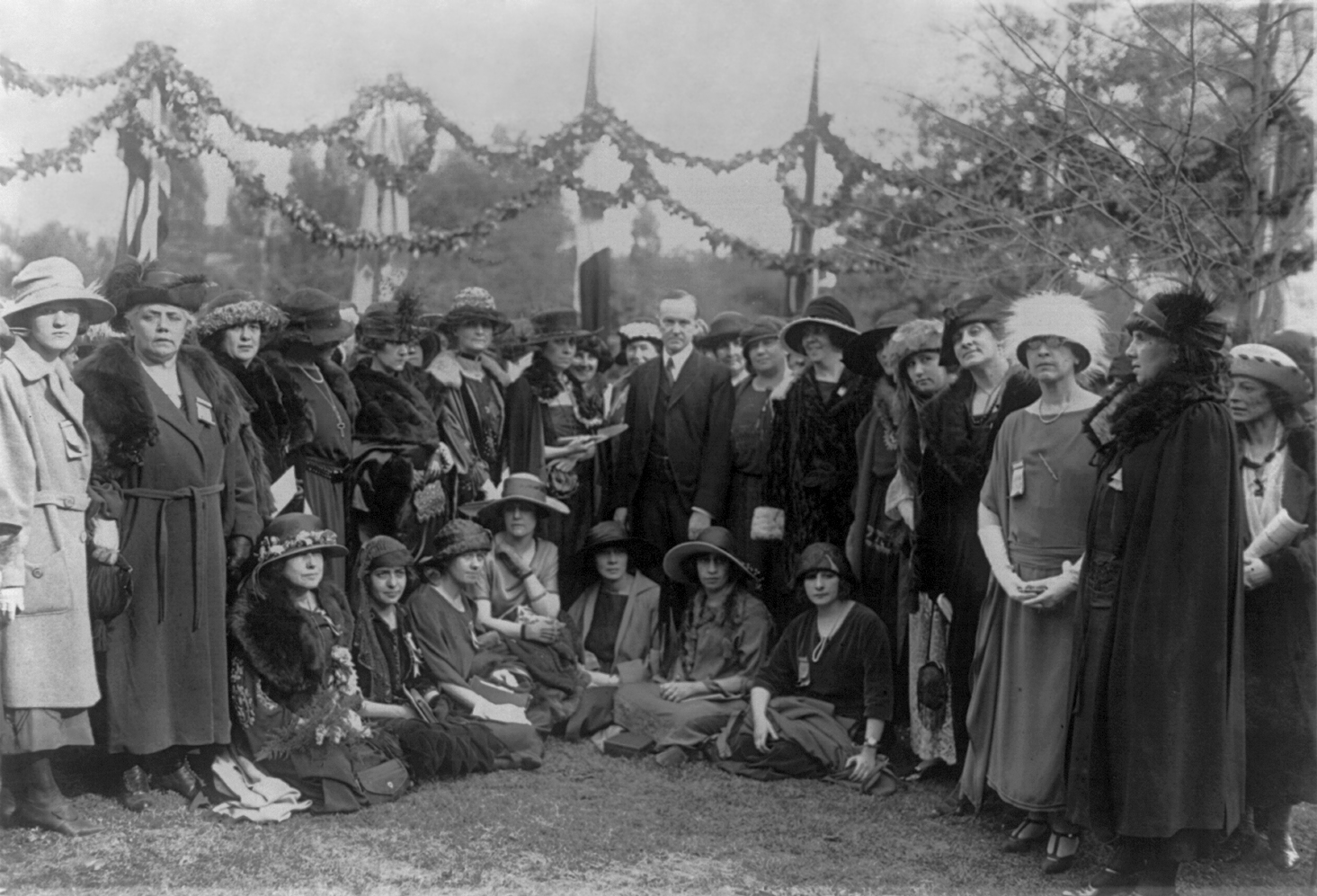
Pan-American women at the International Tree Planting – 1922

The burgeoning development to press for women's rights was somewhat different in Latin America than in North America. In the US-style model of individual freedom, rights for women meant women should have the same rights as men. The relational feminism which developed in Latin America was more geared to protect the rights that women gained as wives and mothers—rights that made them inherently different from men. Though different in some ways, in others, women's situation was the same, as 19th-century politicians believed that granting rights to minorities would undermine the authority of the state and threaten stability by overturning the social order. At the end of the century, women throughout the Americas began to participate in women's conferences and congresses as a way to discuss "scientific, economic, social and political issues". In Latin America, some of the important meetings were Latin American Scientific Congresses that met in various capitals: Buenos Aires (1898), Montevideo (1901), Rio de Janeiro (1905), and Santiago (1908). North American women participated in International Congresses of Women, including those held in Paris (1878), London (1899), Berlin (1904), Amsterdam (1908) and Stockholm (1911). U.S. interventionism, which had expanded during the end of the colonial era through World War I, increasingly brought criticism from Latin America and the Caribbean region. In an effort at reconciliation, diplomacy through Inter-American consultation rose and women formed regional networks to find regional solutions as well.

Early hemispherical conferences looked for ways and means to improve education for women, provide for children, and promote social welfare programs. The 1922 Pan-American Conference of Women held in Baltimore, addressed those issues as well as peace throughout the region, socio-economic and political opportunities for women, and an end to trafficking of women. The Inter-American Commission of Women was established as part of the Pan-American Movement in 1928. It was the first body solely dedicated to women's issues involving governments of multiple states. One of the first goals set out by the organization was to address disparities in women's legal status in varying countries. Besides the issue of suffrage, women looked at whether their nationality was effected if they married, whether they maintained control of their assets upon marriage, whether they had equal custody over their children, if they could serve on juries, and many other issues. Their regional efforts resulted in passage of the first international agreement, the Convention on the Nationality of Women, ever adopted to protect women's rights.

=== Women in the Americas during wartime ===
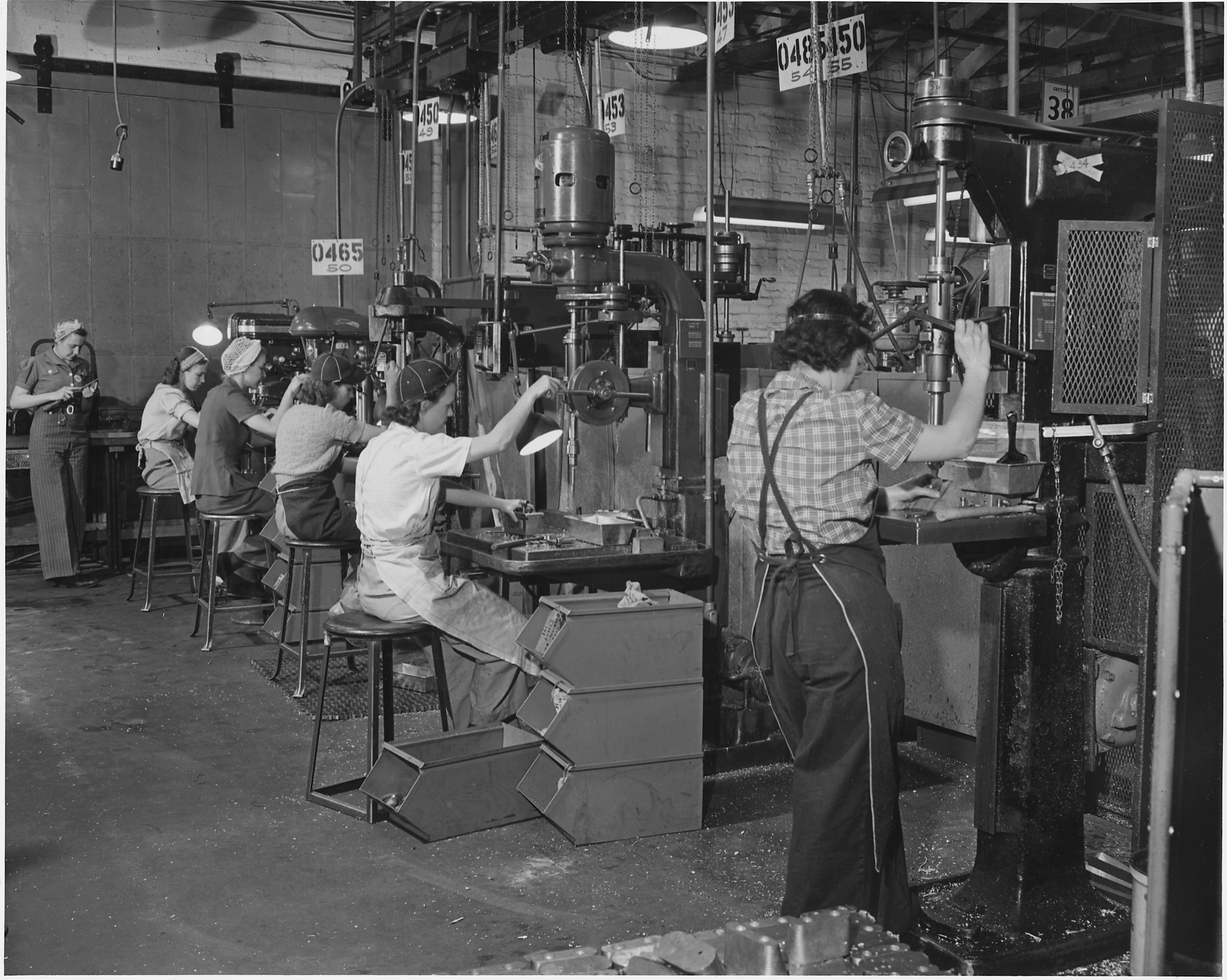
Women work in a west coast United States airplane factory on drill presses in 1942.

In Canada, women were first officially admitted to the military in 1885, where they worked as nurses in the North-West Resistance.

During World War I, in the United States, as many men left to fight the war, women took over many jobs. The Woman's Land Army of America (WLA) helped women take over farming work, especially in California. Canadian women also worked in an organized fashion on home defense during World War I. Women in the United States were unable to join the military officially, but could work as civilian volunteers.

In the United States, during World War II, "more than 310,000 women worked in the U.S. aircraft industry" and also contributed to the munitions industry.

Women in Canada could join the auxiliary air force and army organizations in 1941 and approximately 50,000 women eventually joined.

== Women and culture ==
Traditional roles === After the European colonization of Canada, women played different traditional roles. Besides household duties, some women participated in the fur trade, the major source of cash in New France. They worked at home alongside their husbands or fathers as merchants, clerks and provisioners. Some were widowed, and took over their husbands' roles. A handful were active entrepreneurs in their own right. Similarly, in the United States, women had more influence in the "domestic" sphere, even though they often worked along with their husbands in colonial society.

According to Tuñón Pablos, the women of Mexico had been "exalted in myth" but had remained "subordinated in their (...) role" in Mexican society throughout Mexico's history.

As mentioned above, women's influence in the “domestic sphere” depended on financial and social class. Especially in Latin America as the New World, the colonies were in development. Honor was crucial to women and society. In order to maintain honor, “women had to remain virgins until marriage and thereafter remain faithful to their husbands”. As a practical matter, the “honor code” required that women be sheltered and under the eye and protection of a male family member at all times; being alone was not an option. A popular saying during that time went as such is, “a lady left her house only three times in her life in her life: for her baptism, for her marriage, and for her funeral”. A woman's life during the 1800s did not leave room for freedom or self expression.

Elite women could live these rigid life rules. For women born into a poor financial household, her reality would be completely different. For poor women, not only did they face setbacks from a male dominated world but also setbacks from patriarchy in having to work to contribute to their family's livelihood, shared bustling streets, job sites and marketplaces with male strangers. If the woman was single, the money she earned would go to her family or herself at the highest discretion. In the event the woman was married, either in rich or poor financial standing, her husband “earned” everything. Everything was under a man's control, besides his own holdings. A husband gained access to his bride's dowry, a wedding gift from the bride's parents, viewed as a down payment for the bride's future inheritance. In addition, the husband would also manage the couple's property. The only thing a woman truly owned was her jewelry and clothing- a very unfortunate circumstance. If the husband died, whatever the cause, the widow would manage extensive real estate holdings after the husband's death. Many widows did this as an act of control and independence to have in their life, as they did not get the option to do so.

In contrast to European women, specifically Anglo-Saxons, Latin American women fared better. In an Anglo Saxon reality, the husband owned everything- dowry, inheritance, earned income, and real estate.

In opposition to influence in the “domestic sphere” for women, those who were elite and the daughters of merchants and professional men received excellent education opportunities. Which is a much better reality than most women who received no education in that time period. However, the intention behind schooling was to further traditional patriarchal social goals, a “republican motherhood.” Even in urban areas, new primary schools for girls provided instruction in reading, writing, arithmetic, national history and religion, as well as cooking and sewing. The primary intent of this education was to provide the girl with the tools necessary for being an excellent mother and wife. That was it. The education was not to prepare women to work outside the home. The education was specific for future mothers to tutor their children in desirable civic values.

=== Early leadership roles for women in the Americas ===
Incan society had the concept of duality in gender parallelism during the pre-Columbian period. This allowed Incan women in the Andes of South America to have assertive roles in society.

The country of Peru saw European women from Spain who were early conquistadores and encomenderas between the years of 1534 and 1620. There were at least 102 of these women who were political agents, had access to large amounts of wealth, had been granted hundreds or thousands of Native people to work for them as slaves.

== Promoting gender equality for women in the Americas ==
Many countries in the Americas have provided legal frameworks for women to achieve equality with men. Constitutionally, the modern-day women of the Dominican Republic are equal to men in terms of rights and property ownership. Argentine women have attained a relatively high level of equality by Latin American standards, and in the Global Gender Gap Report prepared by the World Economic Forum in 2009, Argentine women ranked 24th among 134 countries studied in terms of their access to resources and opportunities relative to men. Women in Brazil enjoy the same legal rights and duties as men, which are clearly expressed in the 5th article of Brazil's 1988 Constitution. A cabinet-level office, the Secretariat for Women's Affairs, oversees a special secretariat that has responsibility to ensure the legal rights of women. Although the law prohibits discrimination based on gender in employment and wages, there were significant wage disparities between men and women. Women's educational attainment, workforce participation, and rights have improved, especially since Chile became a democracy again in 1990. Chile legalized divorce in 2004 and is also one of the few countries to have elected a female president.

According to Countries and Their Cultures, there is a "very high proportion" of Uruguayan women participating in the labor force of the South American country. And that Uruguayan legislation maintains that the women of Uruguay have equal rights to power, authority, and privileges". In reality however women are still not occupying "higher economic, professional, political, social, and religious positions". In relation to the political arena, UN Women reported that a 2012 study made by the Inter-Parliamentary Union (IPU) ranked Uruguay as being "103rd out of 189 countries in terms of representation of women in Parliament" and that "only 12 per cent of the current members of the Chamber of Senators and Chamber of Deputies in Uruguay are women".

Culturally, the women of the Dominican Republic have an attitude that is known as machista behavior, where women understood and to a certain degree accepted the machismo nature of Dominican Republic men. By tradition, Dominican Republic women are expected to be submissive housewives. Similarly, women in Haiti have equal constitutional rights as men in the economic, political, cultural and social fields, as well as in the family. However, the reality in Haiti is quite far from the law: "political, economic and social features of Haiti negatively affect most Haitians, but Haitian women experience additional barriers to the full enjoyment of their basic rights due to predominant social beliefs that they are inferior to men and a historical pattern of discrimination and violence against them based on their sex. Discrimination against women is a structural feature in Haitian society and culture that has subsisted throughout its history, both in times of peace and unrest."

Gender inequality can be found in various areas of Salvadoran life such as employment, health, education, political participation, and family life. Although women in El Salvador enjoy equal protection under the law, they are often at a disadvantage relative to their male counterparts. Honduras's ranking specific to gender inequality is 105th out of 146 countries, with an overall value of 0.511 out of 1 in terms of HDI (with 1 representing perfect inequality). After the 1979 Nicaraguan Revolution in which the Sandinistas led by Daniel Ortega deposed the dictatorial president Anastasio Somoza Debayle, they implemented a number of social reforms, including trying to eliminate gender inequality and improve female literacy rates. They also encouraged women to participate in the fight for social justice and equality.

According to the Human Development Report Office of the United Nations Development Programme, in Bolivia "men receive more and better education than women, receive increased and better health assistance than women, and have the possibility to generate greater income while working less...if we consider that women, as opposed to men, also have...the almost exclusive responsibility for domestic work". Maternal mortality and illiteracy among women rate as some of the highest in the world. Bolivian women are also exposed to excessive machismo, being utilized as promotional tools in popular advertising which solidifies stereotypes and assumptions about women.

=== Cultural gains ===
Around the time of the American Revolution, women in the colonies gained greater access to the right to divorce.

Women of Afro-Trinidadian mix commonly become "heads of households", thus with acquired "autonomy and power". By participating in Trinidad and Tobago's version of the Carnival, Trinidadian and Tobagonian women demonstrate their "assertive sexuality". Some of them have also been active in so-called Afro-Christian sects and in running the "sou-sou informal rotating credit associations".

Polls conducted by Gallup in nine South American countries in 2007 found that attitudes about women's roles in those countries had shifted. Women were seen as being better able to cope with family and work demands than men and 69% of men felt that women should manage a household's money.

=== Women in government ===
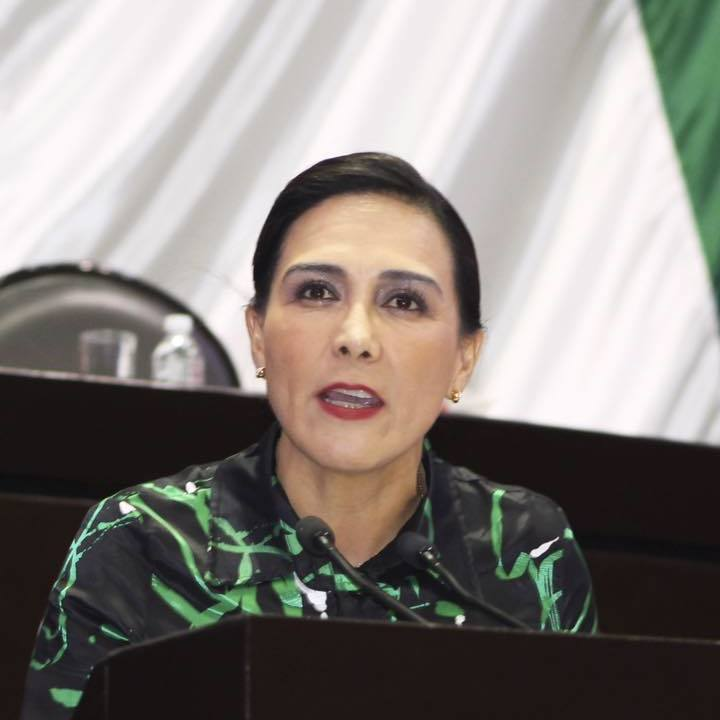
Erika Araceli Rodriguez Hernández, Federal Deputy for the fifth constituency in Mexico, 2016

Women hold 48.9% of the parliamentary seats in the Cuban National Assembly ranking sixth of 162 countries on issues of female participation in political life. Panama had a female president as their national leader, in the person of Mireya Moscoso, who was Panama's first female president, serving from 1999 to 2004.

Many Brazilian women have been elected mayors and many women have been federal judges. The first female assumed office in the Senate in 1979. Women became candidates for vice president for the first time in 1994. As of 2009, only 9% of the seats in the national parliament were held by women.

=== Women and the workplace ===
Women in the Americas have increasingly contributed to the workplace, gaining jobs that were once closed to women. In the book Successful Professional Women in the Americas: From Polar Winds to Tropical Breezes, the authors identify qualities that women who have succeeded in various professional endeavors in the Americas share alike. These characteristics were "high levels of self-efficacy," "an internal locus of control believing that success results from one's own behaviour" and "a need for achievement and a preference for challenging tasks."

In the United States, women have been extremely successful in employment relating to the pre-college and university education of children.

Some women in Trinidad and Tobago now excel in occupations such as being microenterprise owners, "lawyers, judges, politicians, civil servants, journalists, and calypsonians". Other women dominate in the fields of "domestic service, sales, and some light manufacturing". The women of the U.S. Virgin Islands are participating increasingly in the fields of economics, business, and politics. Argentine women have an economic clout in relation to men that is higher than in most Latin American countries, and numerous Argentine women hold top posts in the Argentine corporate world; among the best known are Cris Morena, owner of the television production company by the same name, María Amalia Lacroze de Fortabat, former CEO and majority stakeholder of Loma Negra, the nation's largest cement manufacturer, and Ernestina Herrera de Noble, director of Grupo Clarín, the premier media group in Argentina.

In some countries, there is more work to be done for there to be equality in the workplace based on gender. In 2009, the female labor force participation rate in El Salvador was 45.9 percent, compared to the male rate of 76.7 percent.

Women have also been very influential in labor movements in the Americas. Puerto Rican women became citizens of the U.S.A. in 1917. Before that year – in 1898 – women form Puerto Rico were already active participants in the labor movement and agricultural economy in the island. During the period of industrialization, Puerto Rican women took jobs in the so-called "needle industry", working as seamstresses in garment factories.

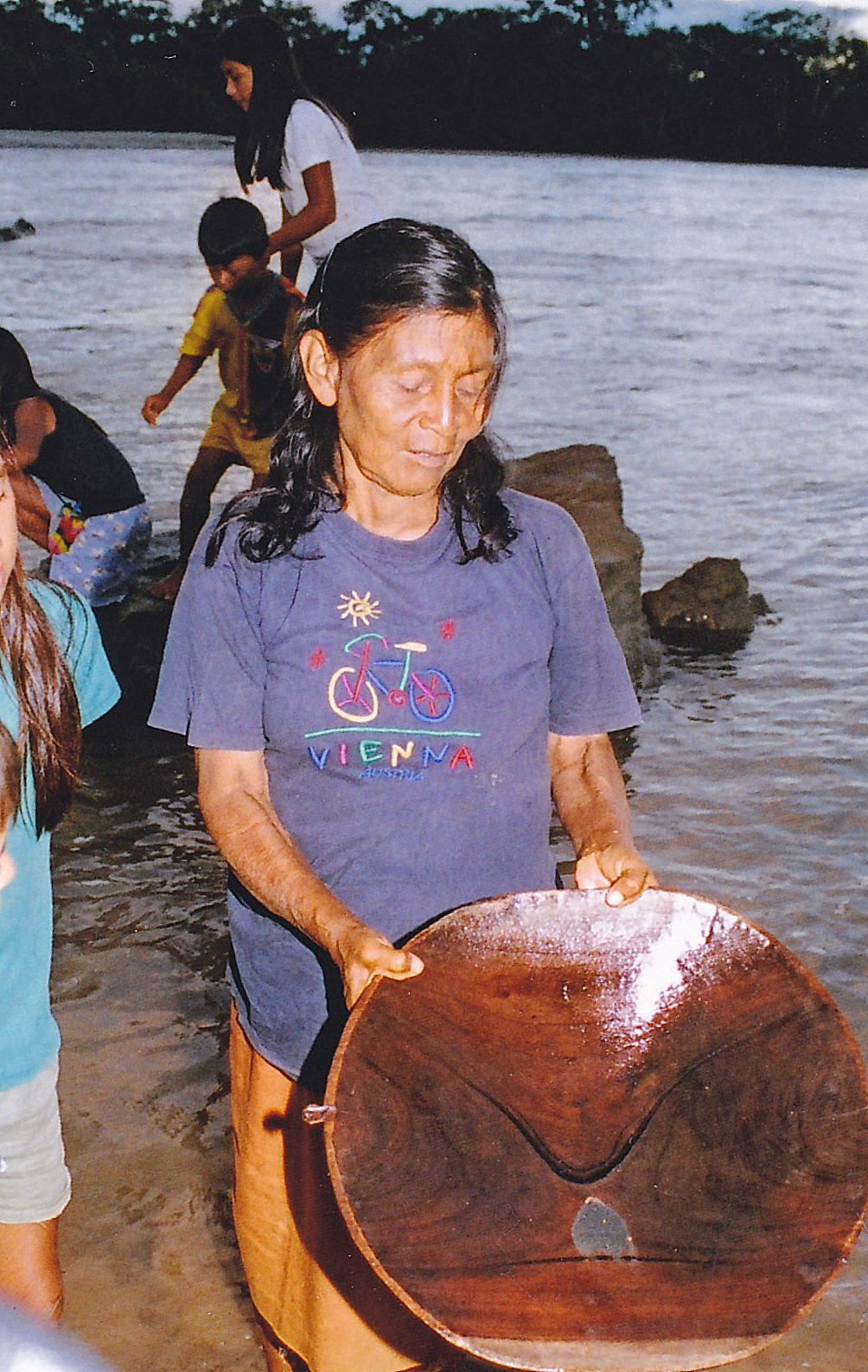
Woman mining gold in the Amazon river in Ecuador, 2014

Many women in the Americas still make a living in subsistence professions. In Bolivia and Brazil, women practice gold mining on a small-scale basis. Many women of Suriname work in the informal sector and in subsistence agriculture. Some women living in French Guiana are from the Maroon society. Although matrilineal in nature, some Maroon women in French Guiana once acted only as assistants or basia to the kabiten or male leader. A common job for the Maroon women in French Guiana include cleaning work in coastal areas, particularly in the markets of Saint-Laurent and Cayenne to earn income that would support their children.

=== Education ===
Education-wise, women in Guyana have outperformed male Guyanese in regional examinations. There are currently more women in Guyana who attend education in universities than do men. Argentine women enjoy comparable levels of education with men, and somewhat higher school enrollment ratios than their male counterparts. They are well integrated in the nation's cultural and intellectual life.

In El Salvador, the percentage of males with at least a secondary education in 2010 was 47.5, compared to females at 40.5 percent.

=== Feminism ===
The legal and government institutions that currently exist in Paraguay were developed in part through the efforts of feminist organizations in the country that held significant awareness-raising campaigns during the 1990s to formalize the guarantees of women's rights.

== Sexual harassment and violence ==
During the times when slavery was legal in the Americas, enslaved women were often used as sexual objects and "had no recourse for sexual harm."

In Latin America, often those who commit acts of violence against women go "unpunished by legal systems that are ill-equipped to prosecute offenders or that sometimes show little interest in doing so."

Violence against women in Guatemala reached severe levels during the long-running Guatemalan Civil War (1960–1996), and the continuing impact of that conflict has contributed to the present high levels of violence against women in that nation. The total occurrences of femicide in Guatemala by the end of November 2011 were around 650 women killed; in 2010 the murder rate was 9 per 100,000 women, vice 41 per 100,000 for males. Claudia Paz y Paz, the attorney general in Guatemala has made violent crimes against women a priority and created a Criminal Court for Crimes of Femicide and Violence against Women.

Violence against women has "been prevalent" in Haiti, especially after the 2010 earthquake.

== See also ==
=== North America ===
- Women in Canada
- Women in Canadian politics
- Women in Mexico
- Gender inequality in Mexico
- Women in Maya society
- Women in Aztec civilization
- Women in the United States
- Native American women in the arts

=== Caribbean ===
- Women in the Caribbean
- Women in Cuba
- Women in the Dominican Republic
- Women in Haiti
- Women in Puerto Rico
- Women in Trinidad and Tobago
- Women in the United States Virgin Islands

=== Central America ===
- Women in El Salvador
- Violence against women in Guatemala
- Women in Honduras
- Women in Panama

=== South America ===
- Women in Argentina
- Women in Bolivia
- Women in Brazil
- Women's rights in Brazil
- Women in Chile
- Women in Colombia
- Women's rights in Colombia
- Women in Ecuador
- Women in French Guiana
- Women in Guyana
- Women in Paraguay
- Women in Peru
- Women in Suriname
- Women in Uruguay
- Women in Venezuela
