= Women in the United States Virgin Islands =

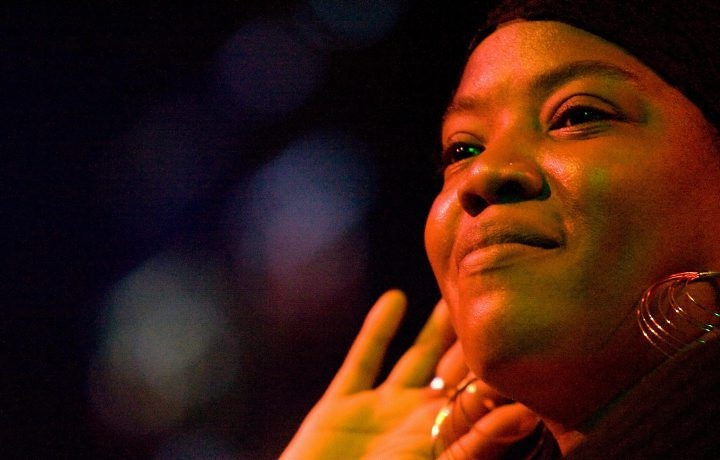
Dezarie, a female vocalist and Reggae musician from the United States Virgin Islands.

Women in the United States Virgin Islands are women who were born in, who live in, and are from the Virgin Islands of the United States, a group of islands in the Caribbean that are an insular area of the United States, and is composed of the islands of St. Croix, St. John, and St. Thomas. According to Countries and Their Culture, the women of the U.S. Virgin Islands are participating increasingly in the fields of economics, business, and politics.

== Labor and business ==
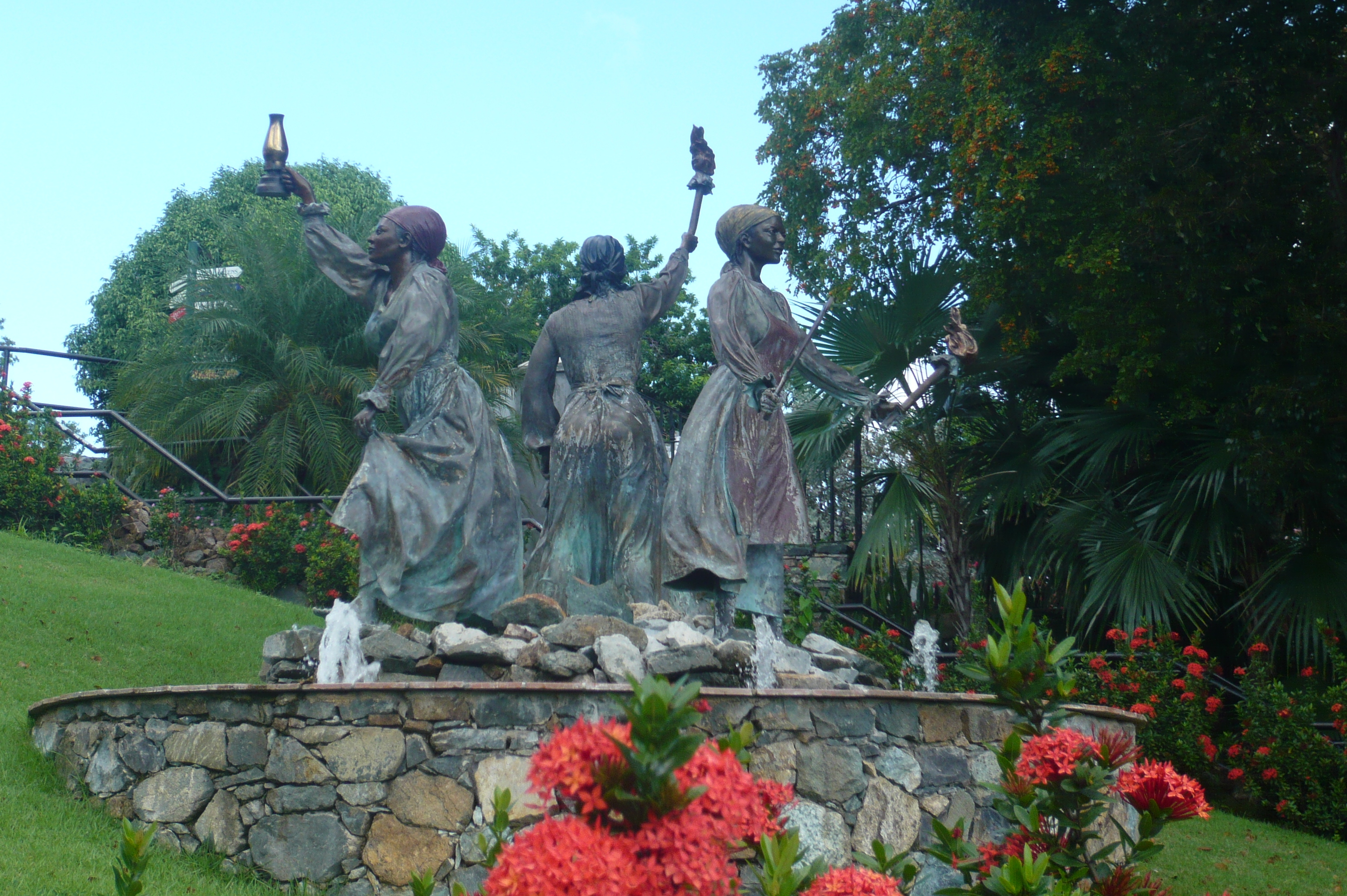
The Three Queens Fountain at Blackbeard's Castle honors the Fireburn rebellion organizers: Queens Mary, Agnes, and Mathilda

On October 1, 1878 the Fireburn rebellion in Saint Croix was led by the canefield worker heroine known as "Queen Mary".

In 1999, the Virgin Islands Women's Business Center was established by the United States Small Business Administration in order to "encourage and train" female business entrepreneurs.

== Politics ==
There is a female Senate president and a female presiding judge of the Territorial Court.

== Family life ==
According to Countries and Their Culture there was a ratio of 1 in 3 households where the head of the family is a "single female parent", which is perhaps to an increasing rate of "unmarried teenage" pregnancies. In 1995, census data showed that there were 34% of "unmarried females" with at least an average of 2 children per family. Caring for infants is traditionally the responsibility of U.S. Virgin Islands women, which involves providing breastfeeding "supplemented by formula given in bottles"; and - in traditional households that hold on to folk beliefs - the mother would usually give the infant "bush tea" to induce sleep.

In 1981, feminist Audre Lorde was among the founders of the Women’s Coalition of St. Croix, which supports survivors of domestic violence and sexual assault.

== Education ==
In terms of educational attainment, compared to males, there is a "higher percentage of females" who finish high school.

== See also ==
- List of people from the United States Virgin Islands
- Demographics of the United States Virgin Islands
- History of women in the United States
- Women in the Caribbean
- Women in the Americas
- Culture of the Virgin Islands
- Women in the British Virgin Islands
- Women in the Americas
