= Koto (traditional clothing) =

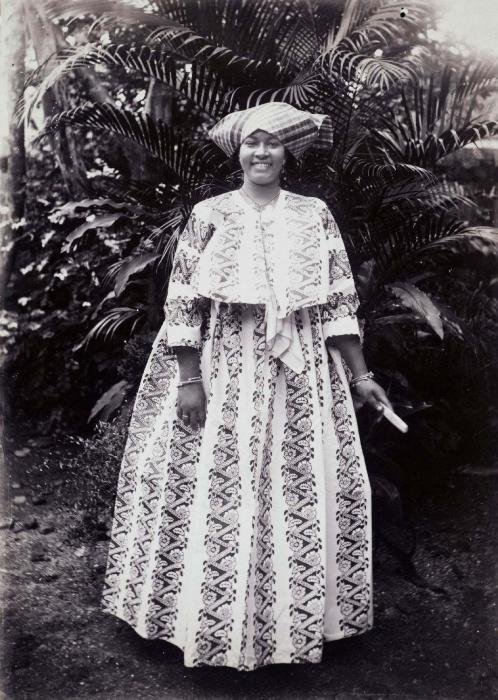
A Surinamese woman wearing the Koto.

The koto is a traditional dress from the Afro-Surinamese or Creole women in Suriname. Women who wear the dress are called kotomisi (misi means miss in Sranan Tongo).

Different kotos exist for various occasions like weddings or funerals. The development of the koto as regular dress is not complete but it is still used in special occasions like the koto-dansi.

With the koto, women wear a head or body covering called an angisa or anisa. The folding of the angisa sends a social message, for example “Let them talk.”

For men the traditional clothing is the pangani.

== Gallery ==
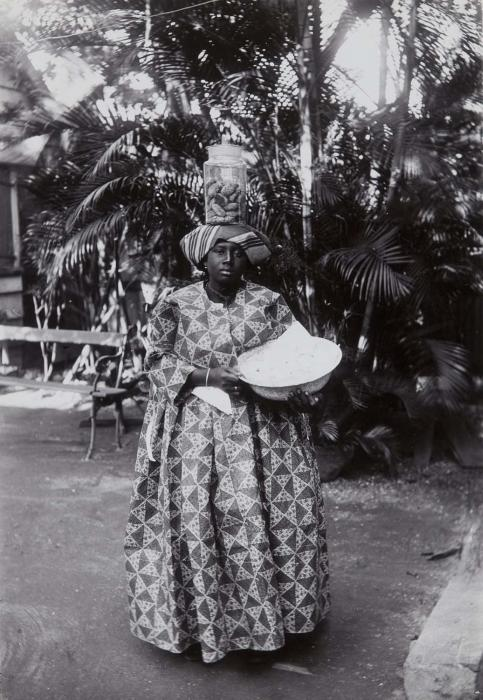
1904-1933

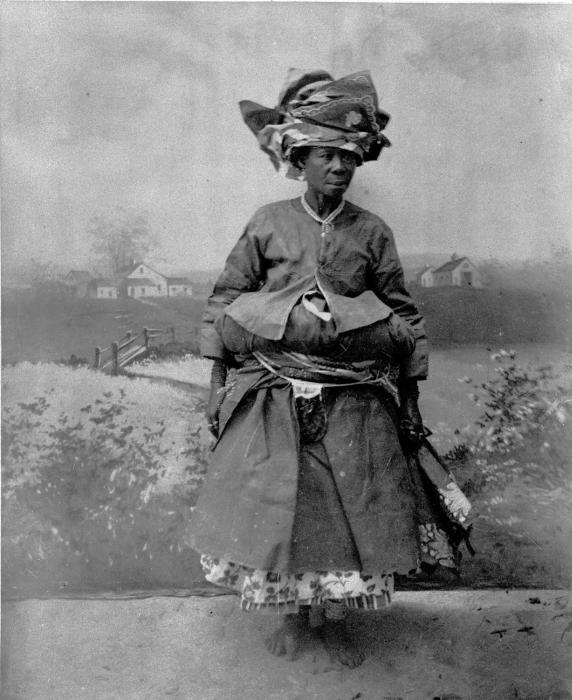
Koto, 1885

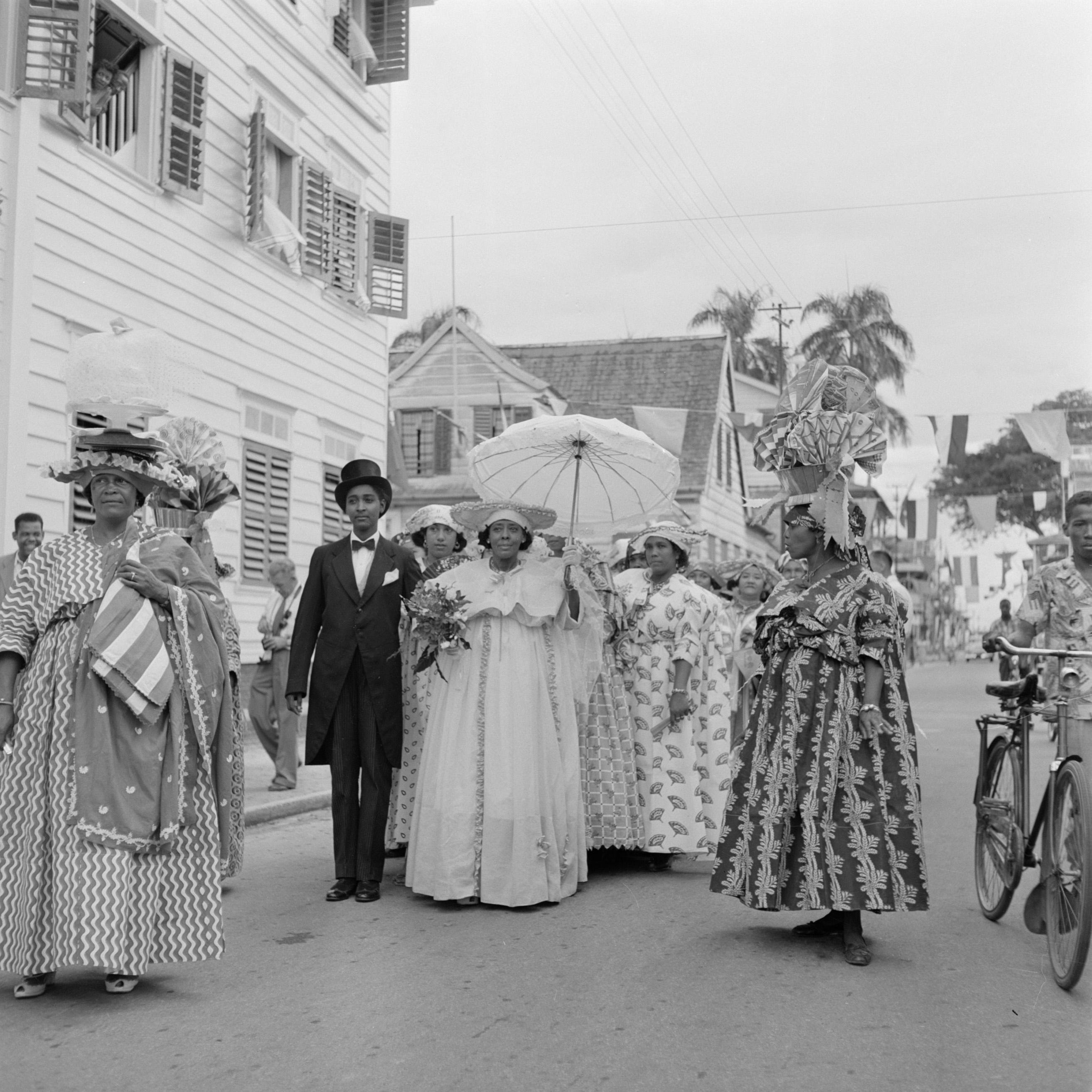
For the Royal Visit to Suriname, 1955

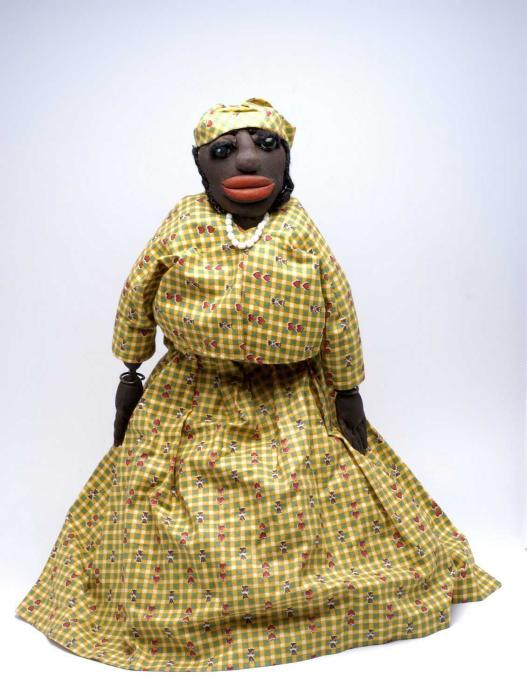
Doll in koto

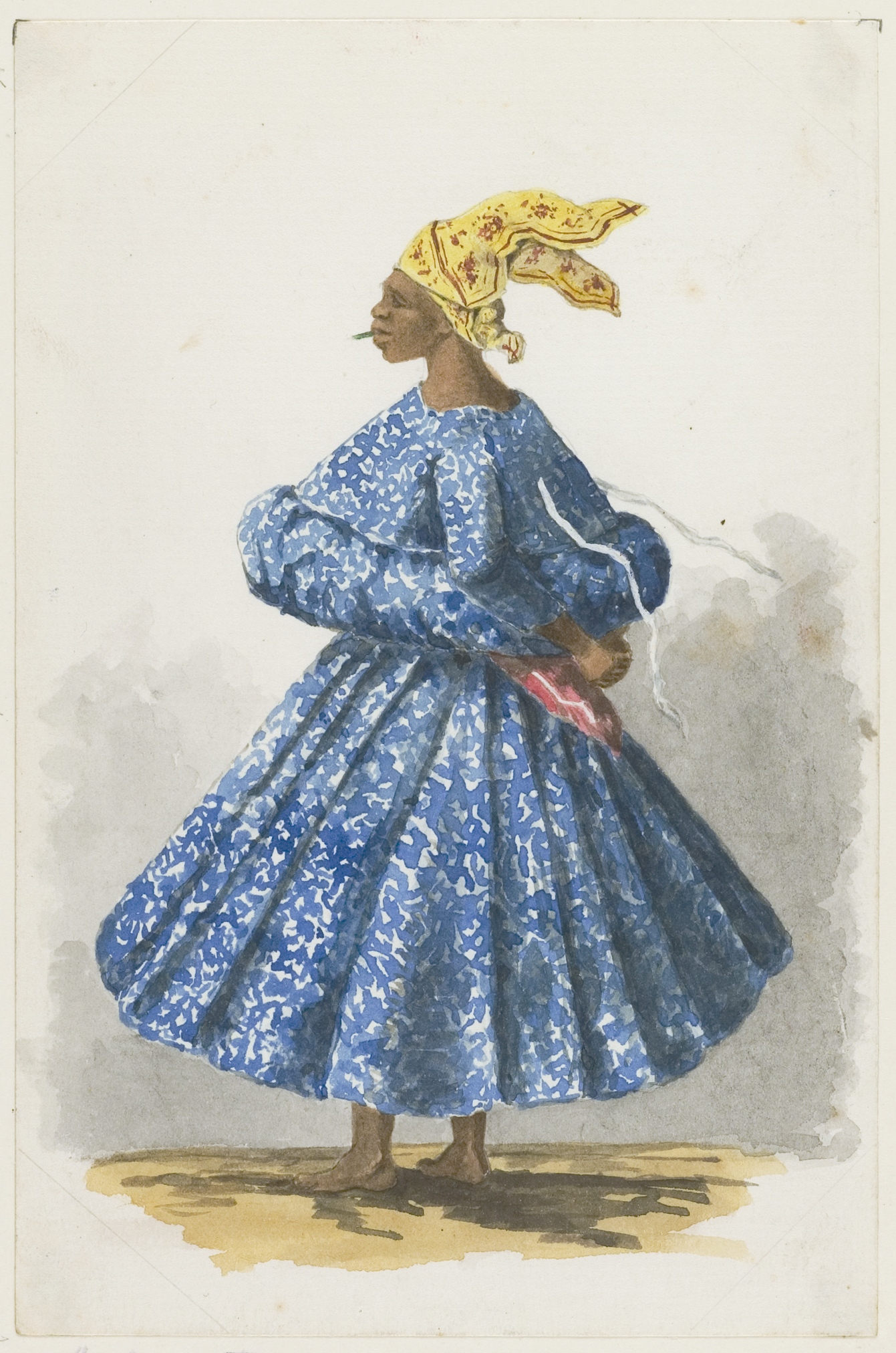
Arnoldus Borret - Kotomisi with orange twig, ca. 1880
