= Women in French Guiana =

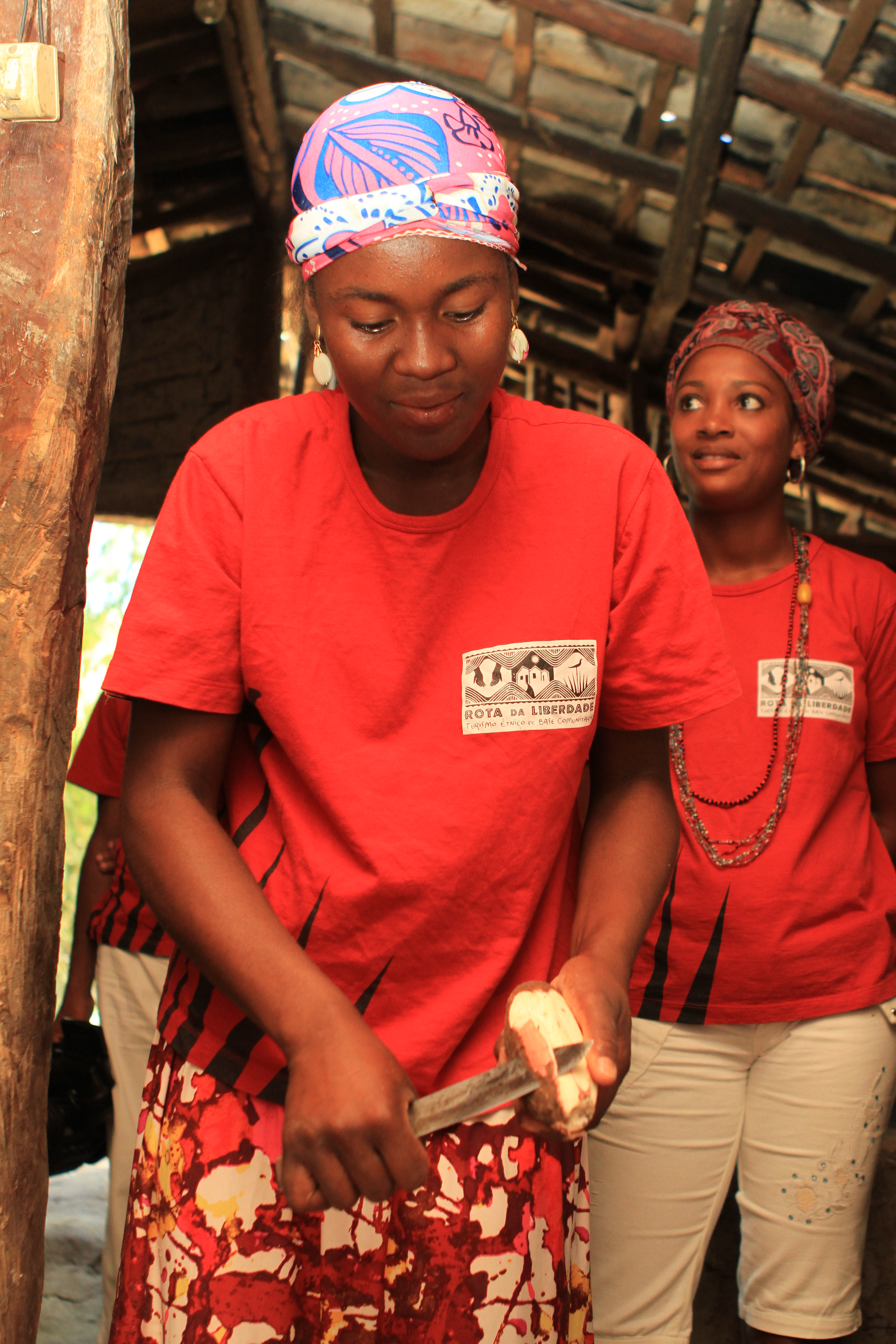
Two modern-day women from French Guiana. The woman in front is peeling manioc (cassava, Manihot esculenta).

Women in French Guiana are women living in or are from French Guiana. Some of these women are from the Maroon society of French Guiana. Although matrilineal in nature, some Maroon women in French Guiana once acted only as assistants or basia to the kabiten or male leader. A common job for the Maroon women in French Guiana include cleaning work in coastal areas, particularly in the markets of Saint-Laurent and Cayenne to earn income that would support their children.

Other women from French Guiana also come from other ethnic groups such as the Kali'na, the Oyaricoulet, and the Wayana peoples.

== History ==
Maroon women in French Guiana led agriculture, specifically cultivation of rice, from the 18th century onwards, and it was generally understood that farming was the domain of women.

== Social role of women ==
=== Maroons ===
Until the 1960's, women of the Maroon societies did not have a great amount of freedom of movement, and when married, had to largely remain subservient to their husbands - they were not allowed to travel without him, nor associate with other male non-relatives, and generally questioning one's husband or the rules set down by the men of the village by women was frowned upon. Though women have greater freedom of movement today, there is still an expectation for them to take a maternal role, and a woman's status often depends on the quality of her homemaking, and the quantity of children she bears. Elder, menopausal women are seen with greater respect than women of childbearing age, and are more consulted on community matters than younger women.

=== Administrative ===
Maroon women in French Guiana and Suriname have historically not held positions of power, though that has been changing in recent decades. For example, the first female Kabiten (head of a village) was elected in 1995 in Ndjuka region, and in 1998 in Paramaka region. This was on the back of an inter-tribal meeting of various village leaders in Grand-Santi in 1994, where it was agreed to pave the way for the appointment of local female leaders. They were not originally granted as much power as the male katiben however, as though they were empowered to resolve local disputes and represent their village in local discussions, they were also primarily helpers to the male leaders, and further were not permitted to carry out libations in memory of the dead (possibly due to the taboo of menstruation).

In the national government, people such as Christiane Taubira have represented Guianese women in French politics, and she served as French Minister of Justice from 2012 to 2016, and was involved with the recognition by France of slavery as a crime against humanity and the legalisation of same-sex marriage.

== Social issues ==
=== Health ===
According to a 2023 study, people living in French Guiana have a lower life expectancy than those living in Metropolitan France, and the gulf for women's life expectancy is especially pronounced. This is correlated with the unusually high prevalence of obesity and diabetes in French Guiana, as well as HIV.

Believed to be exacerbated by a lack of widespread educational facilities leading people to believe folk myth over health science, clay-eating by pregnant women is common in French Guiana despite it being considered harmful to the baby by health professionals.

=== Domestic violence ===
In 2021, it was reported that French Guiana has the highest rate of domestic violence out of all the departments, with 10.4 women aged 20 or older per 1,000 inhabitants having reported violence. This has been exacerbated by poverty and many societies being far away from relevant facilities.
