= Women in Trinidad and Tobago =

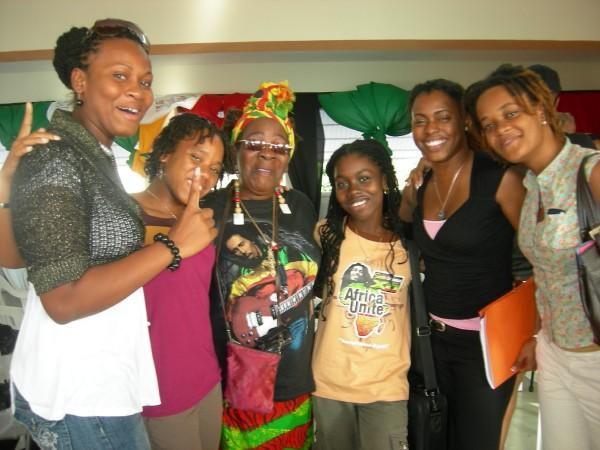
- Trinidadian and Tobagonian women during an "Africa Unite" symposium

General statistics
- Maternal mortality (per 100,000): 46
- Women in parliament: 27.4%
- Women over 25 with secondary education: 59.4%
- Women in labour force: 54.9%

Gender Inequality Index
- Value: 0.344 (2021)
- Rank: 81st out of 191

Global Gender Gap Index
- Value: 0.749 (2021)
- Rank: 37th out of 156

Women in Trinidad and Tobago are women who were born in, who live in, or are from Trinidad and Tobago. Depending from which island the women came, they may also be called Trinidadian women or Tobagonian women respectively. Women in Trinidad and Tobago excel in various industries and occupations, including micro-enterprise owners, "lawyers, judges, politicians, civil servants, journalists, and calypsonians." Women still dominate the fields of "domestic service, sales, and some light manufacturing."

By participating in Trinidad and Tobago's version of the Carnival, Trinidadian and Tobagonian women demonstrate their "assertive sexuality." Some of them have also been active in so-called Afro-Christian sects and in running the "sou-sou informal rotating credit associations."

Gender roles in Trinidad and Tobago are influenced primarily by legacies of patriarchy and colonialism. Baptiste asserts that historical views of race and colonialism impact Trinidadian culture in such a way that are often excluded from Western feminist studies. "Caribbean gender theory has to wrangle with the boundedness of patriarchy at the same time as it tussles with the barnacles of colonialism and imperialism." Gender performances in Trinidad and Tobago occupy three distinct spaces: physical, social, and cultural. Baptiste argues that the physical, public spaces represent a "postcolonial essentialist collage" in which performances are gendered by the socialization of gender roles according to very essentialist views of men and women. Many public spaces display African imagery, primarily from Nigeria and Ghana because these nations are still Trinidad and Tobago's closest political allies and cultural beacons. These social spaces provide an outlet in the face of a country struggling with increasing crime rates against women.

== Education ==
As of 1997 on average, from primary to tertiary levels of schooling, girls were outperforming or had higher enrollment levels than boys in Trinidad and Tobago. This pattern had been observed for the preceding 20 years or so.

In primary schools, girls showed a lower drop-out rate and repeater rate, and score higher than boys on the SEA examination in 1997. In 2015, girls constituted of approximately two-thirds of the top students in the Second Entrance Assessment (SEA) examination and CAPE.

In secondary schools, despite the fact that most secondary schools are structured based on a stratified system of prestige, girls consistently outperformed boys in within-school and national testing as of 1997. In particular, girls were more likely to take the examination and across the Caribbean, girls achieved higher CXC results in English, history and social studies.

There is a high enrollment rate of females in tertiary learning institutions—about 65 percent of total students enrolled at University of the West Indies, St. Augustine campus in 2009/2010 were female.

== Economy ==
Women generally enjoyed the same legal rights as men, including employment, education, and inheritance rights. No laws or regulations require equal pay for equal work. While equal pay for men and women in public service was the rule rather than the exception, both the government and NGOs noted considerable disparities in pay between men and women in the private sector, particularly in agriculture.

=== Workforce participation ===
As of 2016, 60% of Trinidadian women participate in the labour to force, compared to 81% participation from the male population. Historically, female labour force participation rates in Trinidad and Tobago are lower than male participation rates. Over the past two decades (1990–2010), this disparity between these rates has been decreasing. Following the recession of the 1980s when the labour force participation rate dipped to 55.6 percent, the rate has hovered around 62 percent over the last decade. The size of the labour force has increased over the years, moving from 480,000 persons in 1987 to 619,000 persons in 2010—an annual average growth rate of 1.1 percent. Even though males continue to be predominant, the share of females in the labour force has steadily increased moving from 31.8 percent in 1980 to 41.4 percent in 2010.

Generally, women are dominant in the service industry and as clerks and associate professionals. There is some level of equality at the professional level, however men have a greater presence at senior levels. Women whose highest level of education attained was primary were 13% more likely to participate, while those with secondary level attainment were 14% more likely to participate. Women with tertiary level education had a probability of participation of 8%.

Trinidad and Tobago's female labour is also lower than some of its (commonly compared to) neighbouring countries. From 2000 to 2009, Barbados and Jamaica's rates averaged 65.1 percent and 57.4 percent, respectively.

According to the 2012 National Gender Policy, despite high levels of education and employment, women are still the primary care-givers in the society with the majority of the responsibility for raising children, performing housework, taking care of the sick, the aging and elderly, and the disabled, and managing many of community-based organizations.

=== Gender wage gap ===
In 2016, Trinidad and Tobago ranked 91st in the world (out of 114 countries) in wage equality between men and women for similar work. Research shows that there are substantial wage differences between men and women in Trinidad and Tobago. While women account for the largest entry into both the workforce and education, a 2015 study shows that their wages are still less than men. On average, women earn US$22,656 a year, while for that same period, men earn US$41,527. In the private sector, it appears that female workers, regardless of their position along the wage distribution, face a similar degree of discrimination. At the aggregate level, there is a significant difference between male and female wages. Investigation showed that the demographics with the highest levels of discrimination were in the age groups 35–44, income levels $3,000–$5,999 and private sector employment vs public sector. As of 2015, the wage gap is found to be larger in the private sector than the public sector, and the gap is larger at the lower end of the wage distribution. In the private sector, at the 10th percentile the gender wage gap is 25.9 percent compared to 12.0 percent at the 90th percentile.

Trinidad and Tobago has ratified several conventions related to labour and workforce standards including the International Labour Organisation (ILO) Conventions including the Tripartite Consultation (International Labour Standards) Convention, 1976 (No. 144), the Industrial Relations Act (1972), the Retrenchment and Severance Payments Act (1985), the Minimum Wage Act (1976), and most recently, the Equal Opportunity Act (2000). In particular, the Equal Opportunity Act (EOA) prohibits an employer or prospective employer from discriminating against an employee or a prospective employee because of their status (race, disability, ethnicity, marital status, religion, sex, or geographical origin). However, currently, Trinidad and Tobago does not have any legislation pertaining to equal pay for work of equal value.

According to the National Council of State Administration Secretaries Research Corporation, there are six key factors that influence this wage gap: occupation, human capital, work experience, career interruption, motherhood and industry sector. Even with these in mind, Mahabir & Ramrattan assert that discrimination based on sex is apparent when critically examining similar scenarios affecting both men and women. The greatest disparity comes from the fact that married women or those in common law marriages still earn disproportiante wages compared to men in the same scenario. While Trinidad and Tobago is ranked 50 out of 148 countries by the Gender Inequality Index, the major factors that influence workplace disparities are inherently gendered. This is generally thought to be due to a combination of a strong patriarchal "old boys" network which favors each other regarding employment and wages, and a historical and cultural background that does not place as much value on women's work as it does men's.

=== Property rights ===
The Constitution of Trinidad and Tobago prohibits all forms of discrimination on the grounds of gender. The Trinidad and Tobago Succession Act was passed by Parliament in 1981 and Legislation on Property Rights was also passed, revising provisions on real property and women's property rights. As such, the Government of Trinidad and Tobago affirms women's rights to property ownership. Although there exists no legal restrictions to women's access to land tenure, Trinidad and Tobago still has a gender disparity of distribution of land ownership, with some studies indicating that only 14% of private land owners are female. It is suggested that this is predominantly male dominated due to the customary regimes like patriarchal inheritance practices.

=== Prostitution and sex workers' rights ===
Under the Sexual Offences Act, prostitution is illegal in Trinidad and Tobago, and those found guilty of an offence are liable of up to five years imprisonment. This includes person that "lives wholly or in part on the earnings of prostitution" and those who are "aiding, abetting or compelling the prostitution". Authorities continue to monitor, investigate, and prosecute major operators believed to be engaged in soliciting for prostitution.

== Family ==
=== Cohabitation/common-law relationships ===
Cohabitation is legal, and common-law relationships can be found to be legally protected under the Cohabitational Relationship Act of 2000. The Act empowers the court to make orders for maintenance for a common-law spouse as well orders in respect of their rights to property provided that the common-law relationship has lasted for at least five years; or there is a child or children of the relationship; or the party has made substantial contributions to the common-law relationship.

Under the Cohabitational Relationship Act of 2000, after the death of a common-law spouse who has left no valid will, the surviving common-law spouse or cohabitant is entitled to benefit from the estate of deceased once they lived with that person in a common-law relationship for at least five years immediately before the deceased died. The surviving common-law spouse is entitled to benefit from the estate of the deceased in the following ways:

- where there are no children and no surviving legally married spouse, the common-law spouse is entitled to the whole estate, or;
- where the deceased has a child or children and no surviving legally-married spouse, the surviving common-law spouse is entitled to half of the estate, or;
- where the deceased has a surviving legally-married spouse, the surviving common-law spouse is only entitled to a portion of the deceased's estate acquired during the common-law relationship

=== Marriage ===
As of June 2017, the legal age of marriage in Trinidad and Tobago is 18. Prior to 2017, four Acts regulated the age of marriage in Trinidad and Tobago, leading to a number of inconsistencies:

- The Marriage Act of 1923, which governs Christian and civil marriages, set the minimum age of marriage at 18 years but allowed exceptions on religious grounds.
- The Muslim Marriage and Divorce Act set the minimum age of marriage at 12 for girls and 16 for boys.
- The Hindu Marriage Act set the minimum age of marriage at 14 for girls and 18 for boys,
- The Orisha Marriage Act set the minimum age of marriage at 16 for girls and 18 for boys.

In May 2016, child marriage was the subject of heated debate after the Inter-Religious Organisation (IRO) suggested that the country's marriage laws should not be amended, despite allowing girls as young as 12 to get married. In January 2017, the Attorney General Faris Al-Rawi announced a bill to harmonize the country's marriage laws and raise the legal minimum age of marriage to 18 years old, without exception. On 18 January 2017 this bill passed through the Senate and moved to be debated by members of parliament in the Lower House.

According to the then Attorney General Faris Al-Rawi, in the past 20 years, the country had recorded 3,478 child marriages, and of this figure, a mere 74 were males under the age of 18, meaning that 97% of child marriages were girls. In June 2017, The Miscellaneous Provisions (Marriage) Bill 2016 was passed, setting the legal age of marriage to 18. In addition, the bill provides for a new offence where there is conviction on indictment for solemnising the marriage of persons under the age of 18 years, so marriage officers will be penalised if he/she conducts a marriage on a minor.

=== Divorce ===
Divorce is able to be granted to couples after at least one year of marriage, though there are exceptional circumstances under which the court would entertain a petition within a year of the marriage. Either spouse may file a petition for divorce. Either spouse must either be a permanent resident of Trinidad and Tobago, or must have been a resident for at least one year immediately before the divorce petition is filed.

There is currently only one "ground" for divorce—that is the marriage has broken down irretrievably. Generally, to satisfy the court that the marriage is beyond repair, at least one of five circumstances must be proven to exist in the relationship: adultery, irreconcilable behaviour, desertion of a continuous period of at least two years immediately before the petition is filed; separation of a continuous period of at least two years immediately before the petition is filed and your spouse agrees to get a divorce; and separation of a continuous period of at least two years immediately before the petition is filed. Spousal agreement is not necessary in this final instance.

=== Parental rights/family law ===
Research from the University of the West Indies Cave Hill Campus indicated that in contested custody cases, fathers were granted custody roughly 50% of the time. It was found that the maintenance of the status quo was an important consideration as whoever had the children, kept them, even when the mother left because of violence. Gender stereotyping was evident; the mother's moral conduct falling short of an acceptable standard—which was usually higher than for fathers—seemed to influence the courts. In awarding fathers custody, courts invariably found a mother figure—a sister, mother, wife or girlfriend of the paternal figure—to assist with childcare.

=== Parental leave ===
Currently, the only parental leave supported by the government is maternity leave, as stipulated under The Maternity Protection Act, 1998 of Trinidad and Tobago. To qualify for parental leave, an employee must be employed full-time for at least 12 months. An employee is entitled to thirteen weeks maternity leave and may proceed on such leave six weeks prior to the probable date of confinement, i.e. the expected due date. During the period of maternity leave, an employee is entitled to receive pay from their employer to an amount equivalent to one month's leave with full pay and two months' leave with half pay.

In May 2012, while the Maternity Protection Amendment Bill was in the Senate, there was a strong call for paternity leave from Senators on all sides of the political divide, citing the importance of father-child bonds made during early child development, single-father provisions. The bill also raised considerations for parental leave for people who adopt children, as well as issues regarding sexism in the workplace, with allegations of women being demoted or fired once they returned from maternity leave. The bill sought to increase maternity leave from 13 weeks to 14 weeks.

== Politics ==
Trinidad and Tobago is a parliamentary democracy governed by a prime minister and a bicameral legislature. Anyone over the age of 18 is eligible to vote. Roughly 31% of parliament are female and 10% of ministerials position are held by women.

In 2010, Kamla Persad-Bissessar became the first woman in history to become the Prime Minister, Leader of the Opposition, and Attorney General of the Republic of Trinidad and Tobago. She was born in April 1952 and later went on to attend University of the West Indies, Norwood Technical College (England,) and the Hugh Wooding Law School. She was awarded a B.A. (Hons.), a Diploma in Education, a B.A. of Laws (Hons.) and a Legal Education Certificate. In 2006 she obtained an Executive Masters in Business Administration (EMBA) from the Arthur Lok Jack Graduate School of Business, Trinidad. Persad-Bissessar went on to teach; after six years of lecturing she moved on to become a full-time Attorney-at-Law and later in 1987 she entered political scene. Her positions in the political scene are many and range from the years 1987–2016. The positions that she has served include alderman for St. Patrick County Council, Member of Parliament for Siparia, serving as Attorney General, Minister of Legal Affairs and Minister of Education. In 2006 she was appointed Leader of the Opposition becoming the first woman to hold that position from Trinidad and Tobago and as of August 2017, continues to serve in this capacity. She served as the Prime Minister of the Republic of Trinidad and Tobago from 2010 to 2015.

== Reproductive rights ==
=== Contraception ===
Contraception is legal in Trinidad and Tobago, and varying contraception methods for both men and women are widely available throughout the country either through the government-run clinics under the Ministry of Health, organisations such as the Family Planning Association of Trinidad and Tobago and private medical practitioners.

=== Abortion ===
Under the Offences Against the Person Act, abortion in Trinidad and Tobago is illegal except in case of threat to the life or health of the pregnant woman. The punishment for a woman who has an abortion is four years in prison and the punishment for a doctor or other person who performs the procedure is the same. Aiding in the process of finding someone to perform an abortion or other preliminary steps is also illegal and subject to a two-year prison sentence. Although statistics on abortion in Trinidad and Tobago are not accurate, the practice is believed to be widespread. As for most of its Caribbean neighbours, unsafe abortion is the country's leading cause of maternal mortality, and a major cause of maternal hospital admissions.

However, abortion-rights activism generally leads to public opposition. The Catholic Church, the largest denomination in the country with 24% of the population as of the 2011 census, is strongly anti-abortion, and uses its power to stop policy change. The Catholic Church is also supported by other church-based anti-abortion groups. Some Hindu and Muslim leaders also oppose abortion, though others make exceptions to their opposition for incest, rape, and threats to the mother's life.

A 2007 national survey found that although almost half of respondents had an unfavourable perception of abortion, more than half of them were in favour of broadening the legal grounds for accessing terminations. Incest, rape and danger to a woman's life were cited as the most significant circumstances under which abortions should be permitted. The vast majority of respondents agreed that voting on abortion law reform by members of the legislature should not be based on personal beliefs. Notably, 74% of Catholic respondents were in favour of liberalising the abortion law. Also significant is that the proportion of respondents expressing an "anti-choice" point of view rose with age.

== Violence against women ==
=== Age of consent ===
As of May 2017, under the Children's Act, the age of consent for sexual intercourse in Trinidad and Tobago is 18. Prior to May 2017, a child was defined as persons under the age of 16 years and the Sexual Offences Act listed various offences for engaging in activities with persons under 16. Anyone who sexually touches a child under 16 can be liable, on summary conviction, to a fine of $50,000 and to imprisonment for ten years; or (b) on conviction on indictment to imprisonment for 20 years.

As a result, Trinidad And Tobago had a close-in-age exemption. "A close in age exemption, commonly known as 'Romeo and Juliet law' in the United States, is a law designed to prevent the prosecution of underage couples who engage in consensual sex when both participants are significantly close in age to each other, and one or both are below the age of consent. Depending on the situation, the Trinidad And Tobago close-in-age exemption may have completely exempted qualifying close-in-age couples from the age of consent law, or merely provided a legal defence that could have been used in the event of prosecution". The change in the age of consent from 16 to 18 created a need for the government to re-examine and change the laws related to the various Marriage Acts of the country.

=== Rape ===
Rape, including spousal rape, is illegal and punishable by up to life imprisonment, but the courts often hand down considerably shorter sentences. The government and nongovernmental organizations (NGOs) report that many incidents of rape and other sexual crimes were unreported, partly due to perceived insensitivity on the part of the police. One group, the Rape Crisis Society, stated that there were 229 new cases of rape reported during the year, in addition to 615 continuing investigations. Over 60 percent of its clients were between 12 and 26 years of age.

Many community leaders asserted that abuse of women, particularly in the form of domestic violence, continued to be a significant problem. The law provides for protection orders separating perpetrators of domestic violence, including abusive spouses, from their victims, as well as for penalties that include fines and imprisonment. While reliable national statistics were not available, women's groups estimated that from 20 to 25 percent of all women suffered abuse. Citing a 10 percent increase in the number of domestic violence cases filed in the magistrate's court during the previous year's law term, outgoing Chief Justice Sharma asserted that domestic abuse was a detriment to the country's peace and security. In January the Attorney General's Office provided a domestic violence manual to law enforcement officials. NGOs charged that police were often lax in enforcing the law. The Division of Gender Affairs (DGA) in the Ministry of Community Development, Culture, and Gender Affairs operated a 24-hour hotline for victims of rape, spousal abuse, and other violence against women, referring callers to eight shelters for battered women, a rape crisis center, counseling services, support groups, and other assistance.

=== Sexual harassment ===
Although related statutes could be used to prosecute perpetrators of sexual harassment, and some trade unions incorporated anti-harassment provisions in their contracts, no laws specifically prohibit sexual harassment. Furthermore, both the government and NGOs suspect that many incidents of sexual harassment go unreported.

=== Domestic violence and sexual assault ===
In Trinidad and Tobago, women and girls experience domestic violence, incest, rape and other forms of sexual violence and abuse to a degree that is staggering and almost common-place. Domestic violence-related homicide are second only to gang murders as the leading non-medical-related cause of death for women. In 2010, 940 reports of domestic violence were made to the Police, 68.2% of which were for "assault by beating". That same year, the Police received 215 reports of rape, 22 reports of incest, 158 reports of grievous sexual assaults, and 278 reports of sex with minor females 14–16 years of age (Crime and Problem Analysis Branch, TTPS). The degree of sexual assault and harassment suspected to be higher as many incidents of gender-based violence are not reported.

==== #LifeInLeggings ====
Near the end of November 2016, the hashtag "#LifeInLeggings" began circulating on Caribbean social media. Within the thread were countless tales of the sexual harassment and sexual and domestic violence that women in the Caribbean experience on a daily basis; from casual everyday street harassment, workplace sexual harassment, to explicit accounts of sexual abuse of girls, victim-shaming and protection of male abusers through a conspiracy of silence. The anecdotes reveal that even though many T&T/Caribbean women may live independently, and may have a good education and a job, in the transactions of daily living they must still deal with pervasive sexism, gender prejudice entrenched deep within the culture, and active ill treatment from many men. Such men may routinely demean women, see women as inferior, and feel they have the right to control them, use them or abuse them. The heartfelt nature of the negative experiences shared with the hashtag triggered much heated public discussions in reaction to issues raised.

== Religion and spirituality ==
=== Cultural spaces and Islam ===
As far as cultural spaces are produced, Trinidad and Tobago has a large interconnected Muslim population that showcases the duality of public/private spaces. Scholars point to the contrast in which Muslim women within the country perform gender in order to express self-empowerment. Many of these women do not identify as feminist due to the conflicting nature of Western feminism in relation to the historic patriarchal influence of Islam. Baptiste and other scholars point to expressions of piety from Muslim women to expose the monolithic narrative that all Muslim women—even those living within the Western world—experience oppression due to Islam. In fact, Baptiste argues that "an uncritical adoption of hegemonic feminist theory leads to the reproduction of somatic norms" within the culture. Public education within Muslim communities in Trinidadian culture does not require Islamic schools to adhere to any state curriculum; these cultural spaces operate in a unique, interconnected space. Here women can remain devout in their Islamic faith while simultaneously maintaining their social membership to a larger Trinidadian culture. Baptiste explores how Muslim women in Trinidad and Tobago "possess as much or as little spatial autonomy as any other woman in Trinidad. If there are constraints on the woman’s mobility, it is more gender than religiosity."

== Music and gender ==
In an analysis of music and its influence in Trinidad and Tobago, Hope Munro Smith investigated the nuances of calypso music with respect to gender performance. She discovered that representation in calypso music was gendered by a large margin that favored male performers over females. Smith presents the historical context of public ordinances that forced the female influences on the culture underground. This resulted in public performances of calypso being co-opted by "middle-class businessmen who charged a set admission price." Public performances by women were seen as uncivilized and Smith asserts social workers saw it as their duty to subdue the performances of these lower-class women. While male calypso performers were revered, the female performers were mocked and given names not unlike Jezebel that roused suspicion of the female's character. Calypso scholars point to the fact that the genre "became increasingly and almost exclusively a forum for the fiercely competing [male] egos".

By the end of the twentieth century, female performers in Trinidad and Tobago had been socialized to be inferior and ultimately invisible. Smith believes they had all but disappeared entirely. This was a means of social control over women who saw the male performers of calypso as idea caricatures of men; "the ultimate sweet man" who has sex with anyone woman he wants because he is so desirable. Possession of women is seen as the ultimate reward both in bed and in society. Smith presents this "I'll do what the hell I like" as an attitude that is gendered to favour males and sexist against females. The performances are socialized in such a way that woman will fawn over male singers and present him with sexual favors and anything else that will keep him around.

Smith's final assessment is that "music in Trinidadian context takes a very significant place alongside larger political projects and concerns." The performances of male dominate the culture creating a narrative that man's rightful place is to dominate this and other arenas. Just like in calypso music, man's domination of women is a cultural experience that socially controls woman's position in bed, in family, and ultimately within Trinidadian society.

== Notable women of Trinidad and Tobago ==
Paula Mae-Weekes became Trinidad and Tobago's first female president in 2018. She served one term as President from 19 March 2018 – 20 March 2023. She was called to the Bar in 1982 and in 1996 became the fifth female judge in the High Court. In 2017 she was sworn in as a justice of appeal in the Turks and Caicos Islands where she serve until her resignation to take up the post of President.

Audrey Layne Jeffers CM, OBE (12 February 1898 – 24 June 1968) was a Trinidadian social worker and the first female member of the Legislative Council of Trinidad and Tobago. The Audrey Jeffers highway, which runs from Downtown Port of Spain to Cocorite, is named in her honour. She died on June 24, 1968.

Jean Pierre (26 March 1944 – 2 December 2002), was a former Trinidad and Tobago netball international and politician. Between 1963 and 1979, she represented Trinidad and Tobago at five World Netball Tournaments. She captained Trinidad and Tobago at the 1975 World Netball Tournament. In 1979 she was a member of the Trinidad and Tobago team that shared the gold medal with Australia and New Zealand. She was subsequently awarded the Hummingbird Medal, Trinity Cross and Chaconia Medals. Between 1991 and 1995, she served in the House of Representatives and served as Trinidad and Tobago's Minister of Sport and Youth Affairs.

Janelle Penny Commissiong, TC born in 1953, was the first woman of African descent and the first woman from Trinidad and Tobago to win the Miss Universe competition, which was held in 1977. She was awarded the Trinity Cross, the nation’s highest award in 1977 and on September 22, 2017, a street in Port of Spain, the capital of Trinidad and Tobago was renamed in her honour called Queen Janelle Commissiong Street.

== See also ==
- Women in the Americas
