= Women in Suriname =

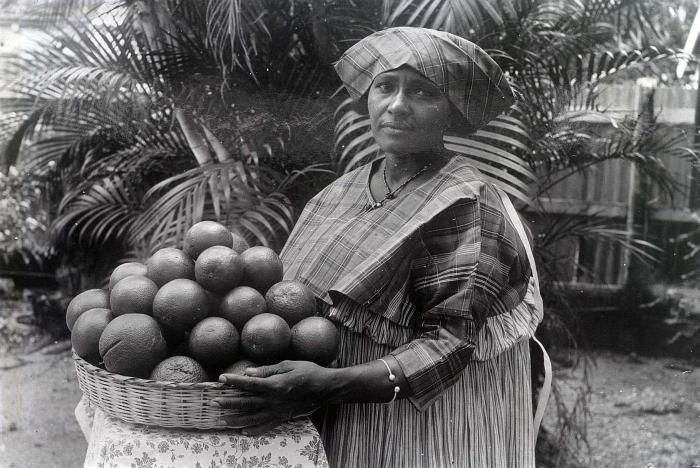
- A Surinamese woman holding a basket full of fruits. Picture taken sometime within 1904–1937.

General statistics
- Maternal mortality (per 100,000): 130 (2010)
- Women in parliament: 11.8% (2012)
- Women over 25 with secondary education: 40.5% (2010)
- Women in labour force: 40.5% (2011)

Gender Inequality Index
- Value: 0.427 (2021)
- Rank: 105th out of 191

Global Gender Gap Index
- Value: 0.737 (2022)
- Rank: 44th out of 146

Women in Suriname are women who were born in, live in, or are from Suriname. Surinamese women may be ethnically East Indian, Afro-Surinamese (Creole) and Maroon), Javanese, Amerindian, Mixed, or of other ancestry. Many women of Suriname work in the informal sector and in subsistence agriculture.

Surinamese women have been described as the "emotional and economic center" of the household (see matrifocality), particularly in Creole family groups. However, in traditionally patriarchal East Indian family groups, they have been described to act as subordinates, expected to obey cultural norms, such as not to practice living together with a partner without being married first and that the bride should maintain her virginity until consummation after marriage.

In relation to caring for infants, Suriname's mothers place their babies inside cribs near them, particularly for sleeping, but they are separated into another room if already at the right age. Other child rearing practices of women in Suriname include mothers carrying their babies during the day until night time, when mothers place their babies in hammocks to sleep. Child care is different in Maroon women and Amerindian women, because they are "reluctant to let anybody touch their babies". In general, Surinamese women allow their children to spend the first five to six years with them.

There are Surinamese proverbs that describe women in Suriname. The saying "An old woman's soup tastes better than a young woman's breast" is an example of those proverbs.

== Clothing ==
According to Country Reports, every ethnic groups of women in Suriname may differ in terms of clothing practices. Women of Suriname with Javanese heritage wear sarongs. The women with Creole ancestry or are Afro-Surinamese wear the koto that is accompanied by a handkerchief or with head or body covering called as the angisa (also known as the anisa.

== Surinamese women ==
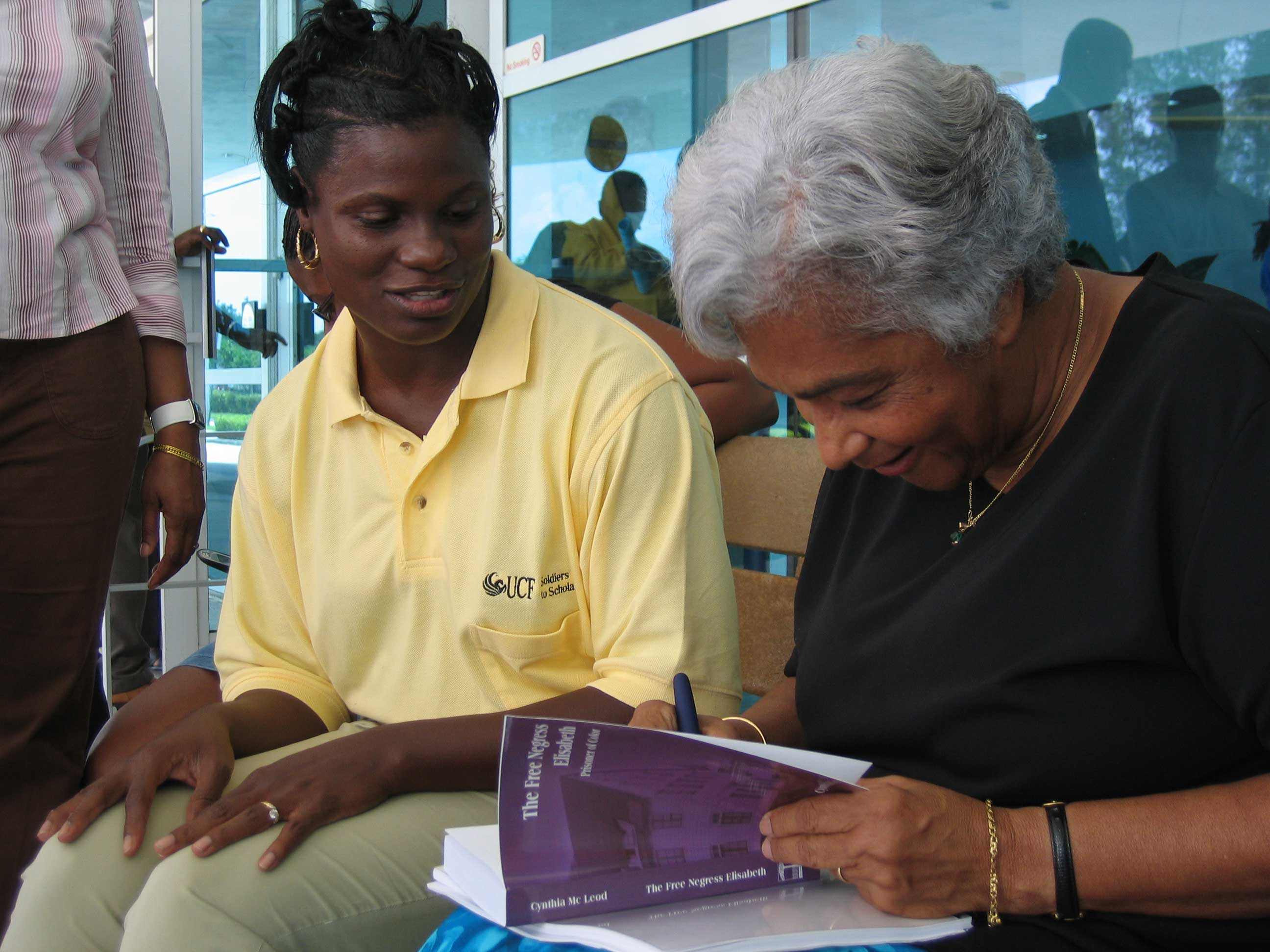
Cynthia McLeod (right) signing a copy of her novel in Miami, Florida, United States in 2005

Women have played prominent roles in Surinamese political, cultural and economic life. In the 18th century, Elisabeth Samson, a free Black woman, became a wealthy businesswoman and property owner in colonial Suriname. Her life, including her efforts to obtain permission to marry a white man at a time when interracial marriage was restricted by colonial law, later became the subject of historical research and of a novel by Surinamese writer Cynthia McLeod.

Women became increasingly represented in Surinamese public and political life during the 20th century. Grace Schneiders-Howard was one of the country's early female politicians. Marijke Djwalapersad became the first woman to serve as chairperson of the National Assembly in 1996, followed by Jennifer Simons, who held the position from 2010 to 2020. Ruth Wijdenbosch was the first woman to serve as vice-chairperson of the National Assembly. In 2025, Jennifer Simons was elected President of Suriname, becoming the first woman to hold the presidency.

== See also ==
- List of Surinamese people
- Human trafficking in Suriname
