= Alfred's blind skink =

Conservation status
- Data Deficient (IUCN 3.1)

Scientific classification
- Kingdom: Animalia
- Phylum: Chordata
- Class: Reptilia
- Order: Squamata
- Suborder: Dibamia
- Family: Dibamidae
- Genus: Dibamus
- Species: D. alfredi

Binomial name
- Dibamus alfredi Taylor, 1962

Species of lizard

Alfred's blind skink (Dibamus alfredi), also known commonly as Alfred's dibamid lizard, Alfred's limbless skink, and Taylor's limbless skink, is a species of blind lizard in the family Dibamidae. The species is endemic to Southeast Asia.

== Related species ==
Another species of Dibamus once had been referred to as Alfred's blind skink, but is now a separate species, Dibamus dezwaani.

== Geographic range ==
Alfred's blind skink is known with certainty only from Peninsular Thailand. Records from Sabah in Malaysian Borneo represent Dibamus vorisi. The Nias (Indonesia) record represents Dibamus dezwaani.

== Habitat ==
The preferred natural habitats of D. alfredi are monsoonal evergreen forests and mixed dipterocarp forests, where it lives in humus or leaf litter.

== Reproduction ==
D. alfredi is oviparous.

== Naming ==
D. alfredi is named after ichthyologist Eric R. Alfred, who was the director of the Raffles Museum in Singapore (1967–1972).
