= Hoeckosaurus =

Hoeckosaurus Temporal range: Early Oligocene

Scientific classification
- Kingdom: Animalia
- Phylum: Chordata
- Class: Reptilia
- Order: Squamata
- Suborder: Dibamia
- Family: Dibamidae
- Genus: †Hoeckosaurus; Čerňanský, 2019
- Species: †H. mongoliensis

Binomial name
- †Hoeckosaurus mongoliensis Čerňanský, 2019

Extinct genus of reptiles

Hoeckosaurus is an extinct genus of lizard from the Oligocene of Mongolia. It contains a single species, H. mongoliensis. The genus name commemorates Austrian paleontologist Gudrun Höck, who collected the type material.

Hoeckosaurus was a member of the Dibamidae (a family of primitive legless squamates), and represents the only known fossil record of the Dibamidae, despite the presumed ancient origins of the group. Despite the close resemblance of the fossils to extant dibamids in the genera Dibamus and Anelytropsis, some distinguishing features such as an open Meckelian groove suggests that Hoeckosaurus is basal to both.

The remains of Hoeckosaurus consist of some jawbones, and were collected in 1995-1997 from the Valley of the Lakes in central Mongolia. The sediments they were collected from are thought to be Early Oligocene in age. Previous studies postulated the jaws as belonging to an arretosaurid (an extinct family of Asian iguanians) or an amphisbaenian. However, a 2019 study identified the jaws as most closely resembling those of a dibamid, and assigned them to a new genus, Hoeckosaurus.
