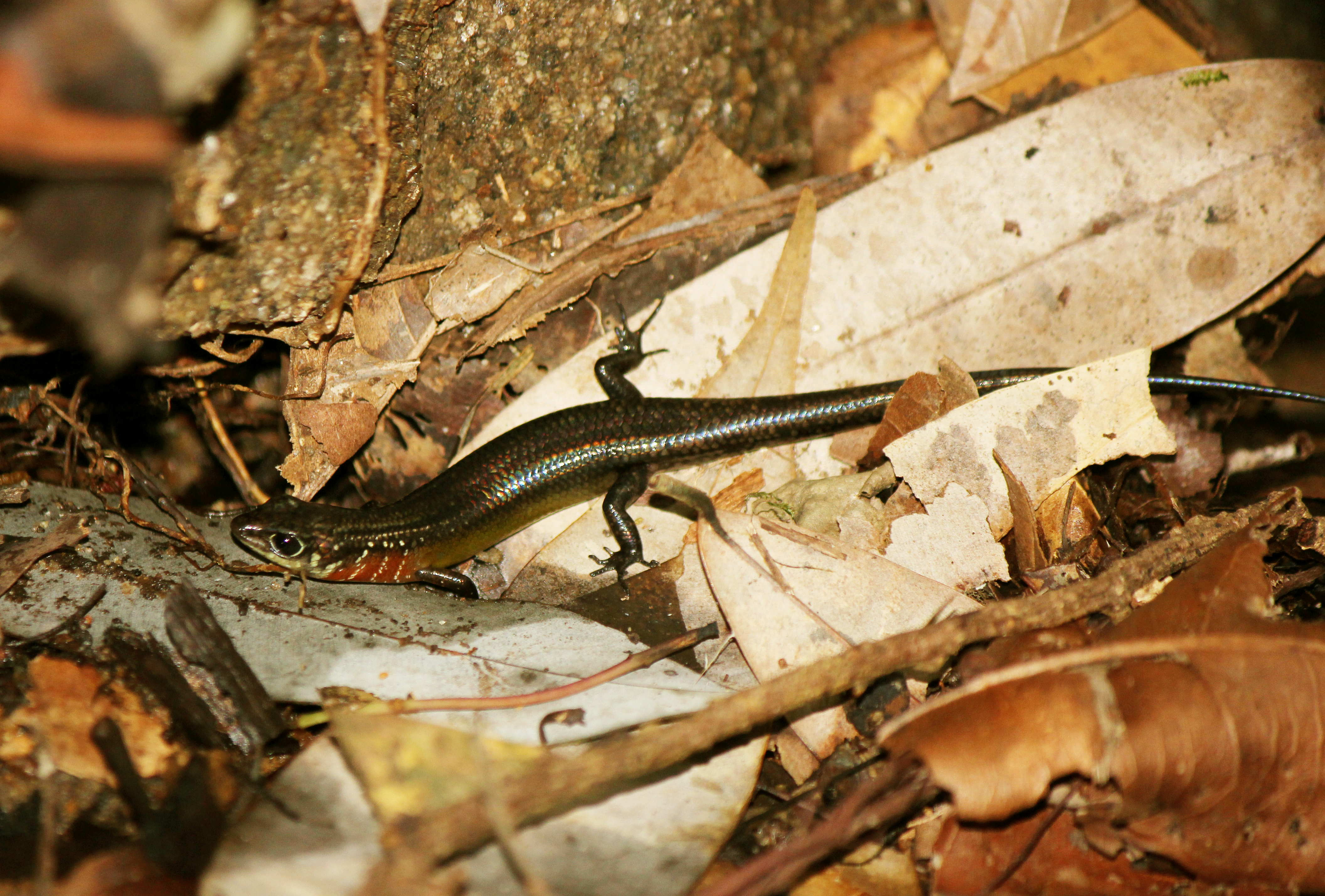
- Lankascincus gansi

Scientific classification
- Kingdom: Animalia
- Phylum: Chordata
- Class: Reptilia
- Order: Squamata
- Family: Scincidae
- Subfamily: Sphenomorphinae
- Genus: Lankascincus; Greer, 1991

= Lankascincus =

Genus of lizards

Lankascincus is a genus of lizards, commonly known as lanka skinks and tree skinks, in the subfamily Sphenomorphinae of the family Scincidae. The genus is endemic to Sri Lanka.

== Species ==
The genus Lankascincus comprises nine species.

- Lankascincus deignani (Taylor, 1950) – Deignan's tree skink
- Lankascincus dorsicatenatus (Deraniyagala, 1953)
- Lankascincus fallax (W. Peters, 1860) – Peters's tree skink
- Lankascincus gansi Greer, 1991 – Gans's tree skink, Gans's lankaskink
- Lankascincus merrill L. Wickramasinghe, Vidanapathirana & N. Wickramasinghe, 2020 – Merrill's lanka skink
- Lankascincus sameerai Kanishka, Danushka & Amarasinghe, 2020 – Sameera's lanka skink
- Lankascincus sripadensis L. Wickramasinghe, Rodrigo, Dayawansa & Jayantha, 2007 – Sripada forest skink
- Lankascincus taprobanensis (Kelaart, 1854) – Ceylon tree skink
- Lankascincus taylori Greer, 1991 – Taylor's tree skink

Nota bene: A binomial authority in parentheses indicates that the species was originally described in a genus other than Lankascincus.
