= Dibamus manadotuaensis =

Scientific classification
- Kingdom: Animalia
- Phylum: Chordata
- Class: Reptilia
- Order: Squamata
- Suborder: Dibamia
- Family: Dibamidae
- Genus: Dibamus
- Species: D. manadotuaensis

Binomial name
- Dibamus manadotuaensis Koppetsch, Böhme & Koch, 2019

Species of lizard

Dibamus manadotuaensis is a legless lizard in the family Dibamidae. It is endemic to Manado Tua island off the coast of Sulawesi.
