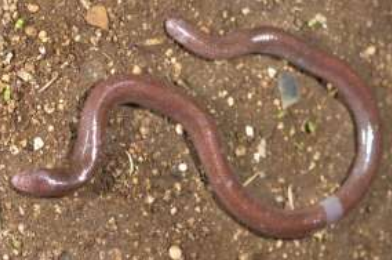
- Adult male of Dibamus oetamai Lambusango Forest Protected Area, Buton Island

Scientific classification
- Domain: Eukaryota
- Kingdom: Animalia
- Phylum: Chordata
- Class: Reptilia
- Order: Squamata
- Family: Dibamidae
- Genus: Dibamus
- Species: D. oetamai

Binomial name
- Dibamus oetamai Prasetyo et al., 2025

= Dibamus oetamai =

Species of reptile

Dibamus oetamai, also known as the Buton blind skink, is a species of blind lizard (Dibamus) endemic to Buton Island, Southeast Sulawesi. This blind lizard lives hidden beneath the ground surface, especially in the moist leaf litter layer of forests.

== Morphology ==
This species has a maximum body length of 145.7 millimetres (5.74 in) and a short tail ranging from 12–14 percent of the body length. The females are completely limbless, while the males possess small, fin-shaped hind limbs. One of the distinctive features of this species, not found in other Dibamus species, is the presence of two to three light bands across the body. Additionally, there are no medial (mid-snout) or lateral (side-snout) rostral sutures (the joining lines of bones at the front of the skull), and it has a unique number and arrangement of head and chin scales. These head scales serve as one of the key diagnostic characteristics for this species.

== Identification ==
The species was identified by researchers from Gadjah Mada University, the National Research and Innovation Agency of Indonesia, the French Institut de Systématique, Évolution et Biodiversité (ISYEB), and the University of Melbourne, Victoria, Australia. The species identification report was published in the Journal of Asian Biodiversity Taprobanica, edition April 25, 2025.

The process of identifying this new species began when Maximilianus Dwi Prasetyo, then an undergraduate student at UGM, brought a blind skink sample from Buton Island to Awal Riyanto, a herpetology expert and UGM supervisor. Awal recommended Prasetyo evaluate all Dibamus species in Indonesia based on museum collections. The results revealed that the Buton Island sample belonged to a new species. After Prasetyo graduated in 2022, he and Awal continued collaborating to write the research report. However, due to a lack of museum data, they involved foreign researchers who had access to relevant Dibamusdata.

The research team studied the taxonomy of Dibamus novaeguineae sensu lato in Indonesia by examining all specimens from the Wallacea and mainland West Papua regions stored in the Bogor Zoological Museum. They also evaluated morphological and biogeographic evidence of the species. By comparing Dibamus novaeguineae sensu stricto from Papua and Dibamus novaeguineae sensu lato from the Lesser Sunda Islands, the analysis showed that the Dibamus novaeguineae population on Buton Island is a distinct endemic phenotype.

The holotype is an adult male, specimen number MZB 4273, with a snout-vent length (SVL) of 103.4 mm. This specimen was collected from Kakenauwe, Lasalimu District, Buton Island, Southeast Sulawesi, Indonesia (5°10'59.10 S, 122°54'59.65 E; datum = WGS84; 14 meters above sea level) by G.R. Gillespie on July 21, 2002. The paratypes consist of five specimens, all collected at the same time and location as the holotype:

- Adult males: MZB 4276 (Snout-Vent Length (SVL): 145.7 mm), MZB 4278 (SVL 117.0 mm)
- Juvenile male: MZB 4272 (SVL 62.4 mm)
- Adult females: MZB 4274 (SVL 138.6 mm), MZB 4279 (SVL 117.2 mm)

== Etymology ==
The name "oetamai" was chosen to honor Jakob Oetama, a prominent press figure and founder of Kompas. The name was proposed by two researchers from the BRIN Center for Biosystematics and Evolutionary Research who served as corresponding authors, namely Thasun Amarasinghe and Awal Riyanto. According to Awal, journalists and researchers share a philosophical similarity: both uncover facts to seek truth through validated processes. "We had some debates about naming this new species. But eventually, Dibamus oetamai was agreed upon because the specimen is from Indonesia. There’s also no prohibition under the species naming rules. We submitted the name to the journal last year, and it was only published this year," Awal said.
