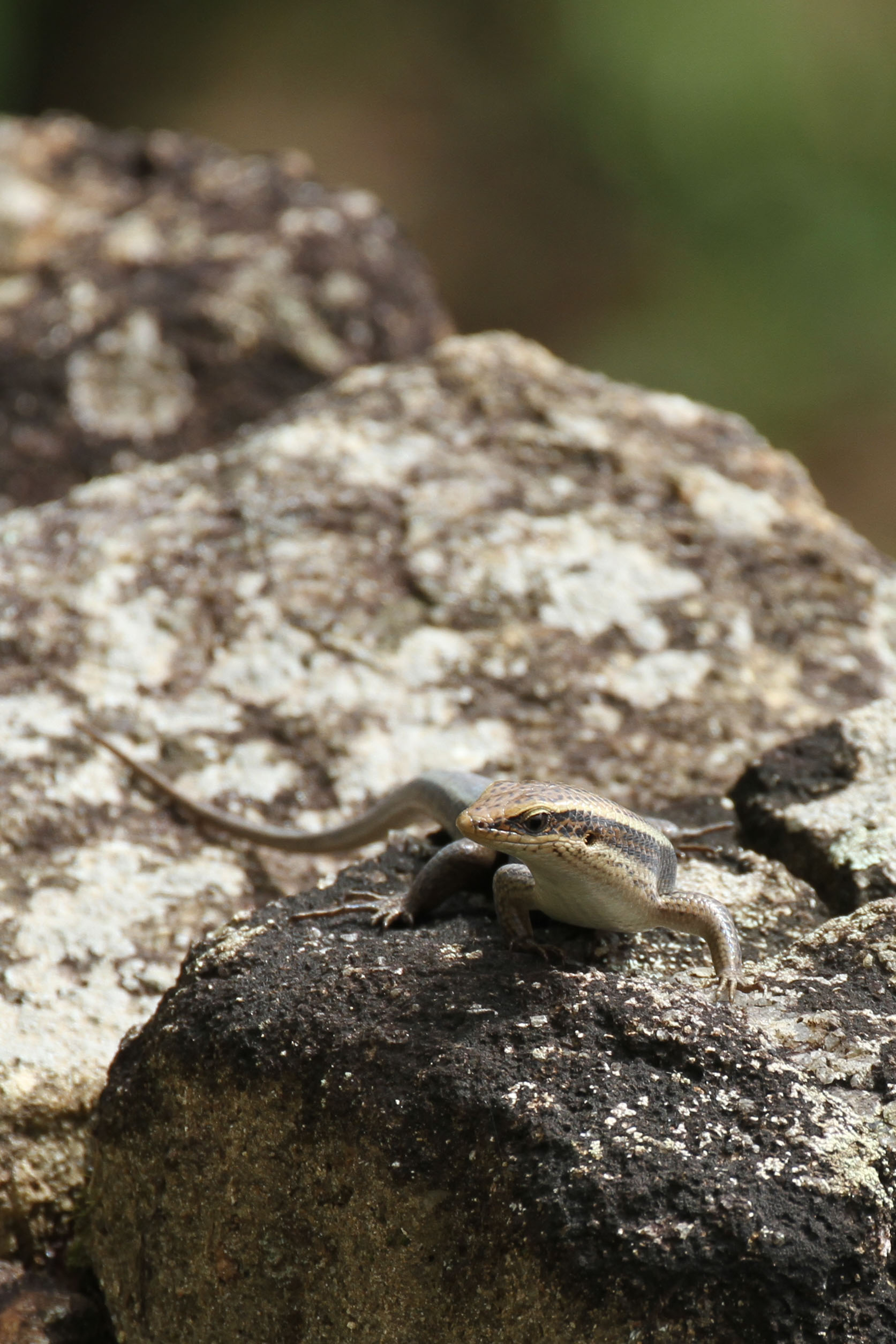

Scientific classification
- Kingdom: Animalia
- Phylum: Chordata
- Class: Reptilia
- Order: Squamata
- Family: Scincidae
- Genus: Lankascincus
- Species: L. fallax

Binomial name
- Lankascincus fallax W. Peters, 1860

Synonyms
- Lygosoma fallax W. Peters, 1860; Lygosoma megalops Annandale, 1906; Lygosoma (Sphenomorphus) fallax — Deraniyagala, 1931; Sphenomorphus rufogulus Taylor, 1950; Sphenomorphus fallax — Taylor, 1953; Lankascincus fallax — Greer, 1991; Lankascincus deraniyagalae Greer, 1991; Lankascincus fallax — Austin, Das & de Silva, 2004

= Lankascincus fallax =

Common Supple Skink

Species of lizard

Lankascincus fallax, also known commonly as the common supple skink and Peters's tree skink, is a species of lizard in the family Scincidae. The species is found in Sri Lanka and Western Ghats (India).

== Description ==
Fronto-parietal is fused, unlike in all other Lanka skinks (where it is divided on others). Midbody scales rows 24–28. Lamellae under fourth toe are 13–18. Males are distinguish with red-throat. Dorsum pale to dark brown each dorsal scale with a pale stripe joining to form longitudinal line on dorsum. A yellowish brown stripe running from posterior edge of the eye to beyond middle of the tail. Throat color varies from red, blue or cream, with white spots, presumably depending on the reproductive status. Venter unpatterned creamy. Ventral scales with a frosted pattern, forming longitudinal lines. Iris yellow in female and bright red in males.

== Reproduction ==
Lay 1 egg laid per clutch in loose soil.
