= Arretosauridae =

Arretosauridae Temporal range: Late Eocene to Late Oligocene, 37.2–28.4 Ma

Scientific classification
- Kingdom: Animalia
- Phylum: Chordata
- Class: Reptilia
- Order: Squamata
- Suborder: Iguania
- Family: †Arretosauridae; Gilmore, 1943

Genera
- †Arretosaurus; †Dornosaurus; †Ergiliinsaurus; †Hemishinisaurus; †Khaichinguana

Extinct family of reptiles

The Arretosauridae are an extinct family of iguanian lizards from the Paleogene of east-central Asia.

Long represented only by a single genus (Arretosaurus), more recent studies indicate that they were far more diverse than previously assumed, with at least five different genera now known. Given their apparent diversity and abundance, they are thought to have been an important component of Paleogene Asian herpetofauna.

Their exact taxonomic classification is debated; they are alternatively classified in either the Pleurodonta as a sister group to the North American Crotaphytidae (based on similar jaw features), or in the Acrodonta with the other Old World iguanians.

The following genera are known:

- †Arretosaurus Gilmore, 1943
- †Dornosaurus Alifanov 2012
- †Ergiliinsaurus Alifanov 2012
- †Hemishinisaurus Li, 1991
- †Khaichinguana Alifanov 2012

Fossils of the lizard Hoeckosaurus were previously thought to belong to arretosaurids, but more recent studies have assigned it to the Dibamidae.
