= Dibamus somsaki =

Conservation status
- Data Deficient (IUCN 3.1)

Scientific classification
- Kingdom: Animalia
- Phylum: Chordata
- Class: Reptilia
- Order: Squamata
- Suborder: Dibamia
- Family: Dibamidae
- Genus: Dibamus
- Species: D. somsaki

Binomial name
- Dibamus somsaki Honda, Nabhitabhata, Ota & Hikida, 1997

Species of lizard

Dibamus somsaki, also known commonly as Somsak's blind lizard and Somsak's dibamid lizard, is a species of legless lizard in the family Dibamidae. The species is endemic to Thailand.

== Etymology ==
The specific name, somsaki, is in honor of Thai zoologist Somsak Panha.

== Habitat ==
The preferred natural habitat of D. somsaki is forest.

== Reproduction ==
D. somsaki is oviparous.
