= Lankascincus deignani =

Conservation status
- Critically Endangered (IUCN 3.1)

Scientific classification
- Kingdom: Animalia
- Phylum: Chordata
- Class: Reptilia
- Order: Squamata
- Family: Scincidae
- Genus: Lankascincus
- Species: L. deignani

Binomial name
- Lankascincus deignani (Taylor, 1950)
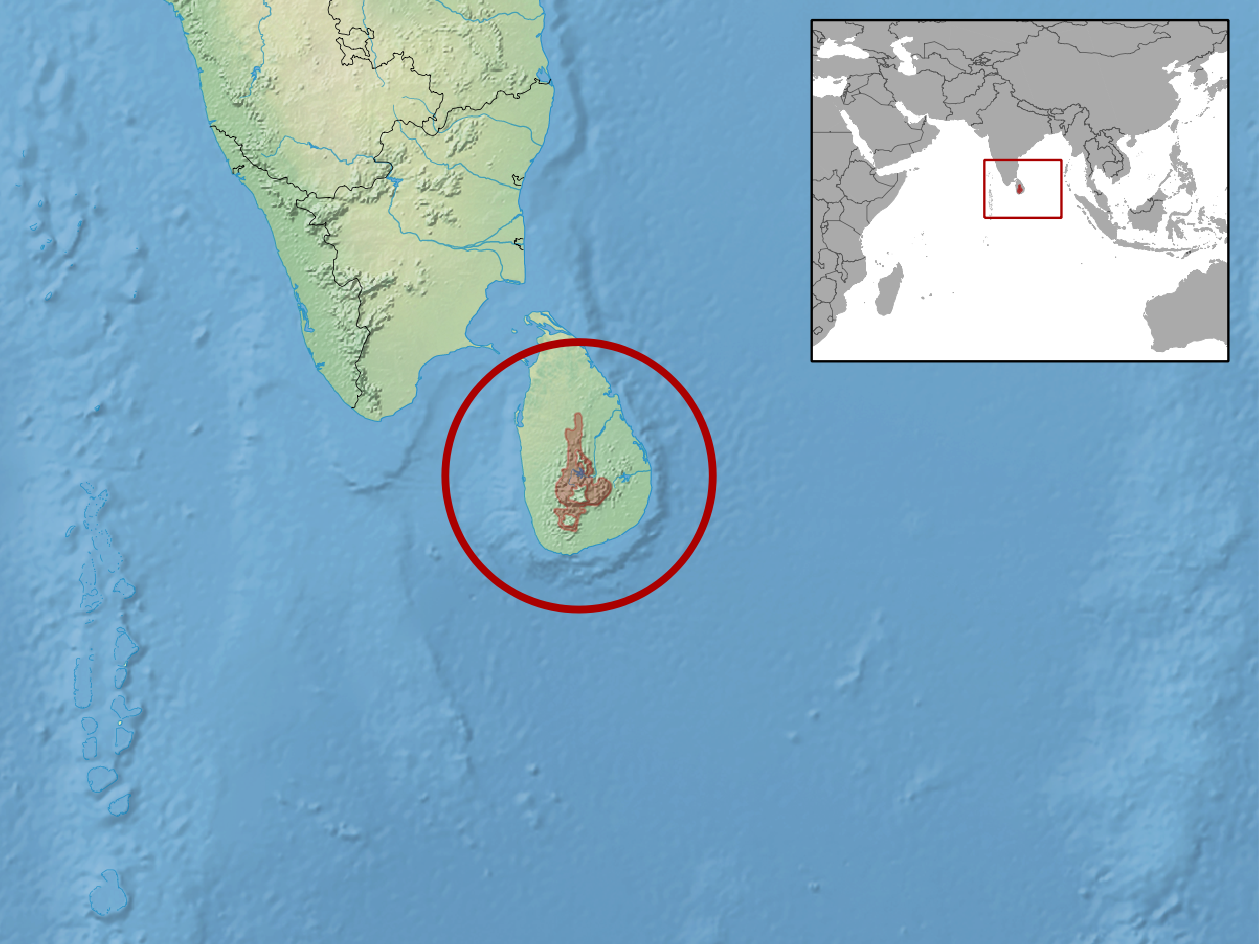

Synonyms
- Sphenomorphus deignani Taylor, 1950; Lankascincus deignani — Greer, 1991; Lankascincus greeri Batuwita & Pethiyagoda, 2007; Lankascincus deignani — Batuwita, 2019

Species of lizard

Lankascincus deignani, commonly known as Deignan's tree skink and the Deignan tree skink, is a species of lizard in the family Scincidae. The species is endemic to the island of Sri Lanka.

== Etymology and taxonomy ==
L. deignani is named after American ornithologist Herbert Girton Deignan, being originally named Sphenomorphus deignani by Kansas University's Edward H. Taylor, based on a specimen collected by Deignan from Gannoruwa Mountain on November 12, 1944. The synonym, L. greeri, was named in honour of Australian herpetologist Allen Eddy Greer.

== Habitat and distribution ==
Deignan's Lanka skink is confined to the midhills, submontane and montane forests, at 600 to 1,700 m (2,000 to 5,600 ft) of elevation.

== Description ==
L. deignani is a rather large and robust Lanka skink. The midbody scale rows number 28. The lamellae under the fourth toe number 19–20.

The dorsum is olive brown. There is a thick dark lateral stripe, edged above by a brownish yellow stripe, and below by 3–4 gray stripes extending from edge of the orbit to the tail-tip. The venter is cream white or pale pink. There are black spots on the upper jaw.

== Ecology and diet ==
L. deignani is found in moist leaf litter, under stones and logs in forests.

Its diet comprises insects.

== Reproduction ==
L. deignani is oviparous. Typically two eggs are laid per one time.
