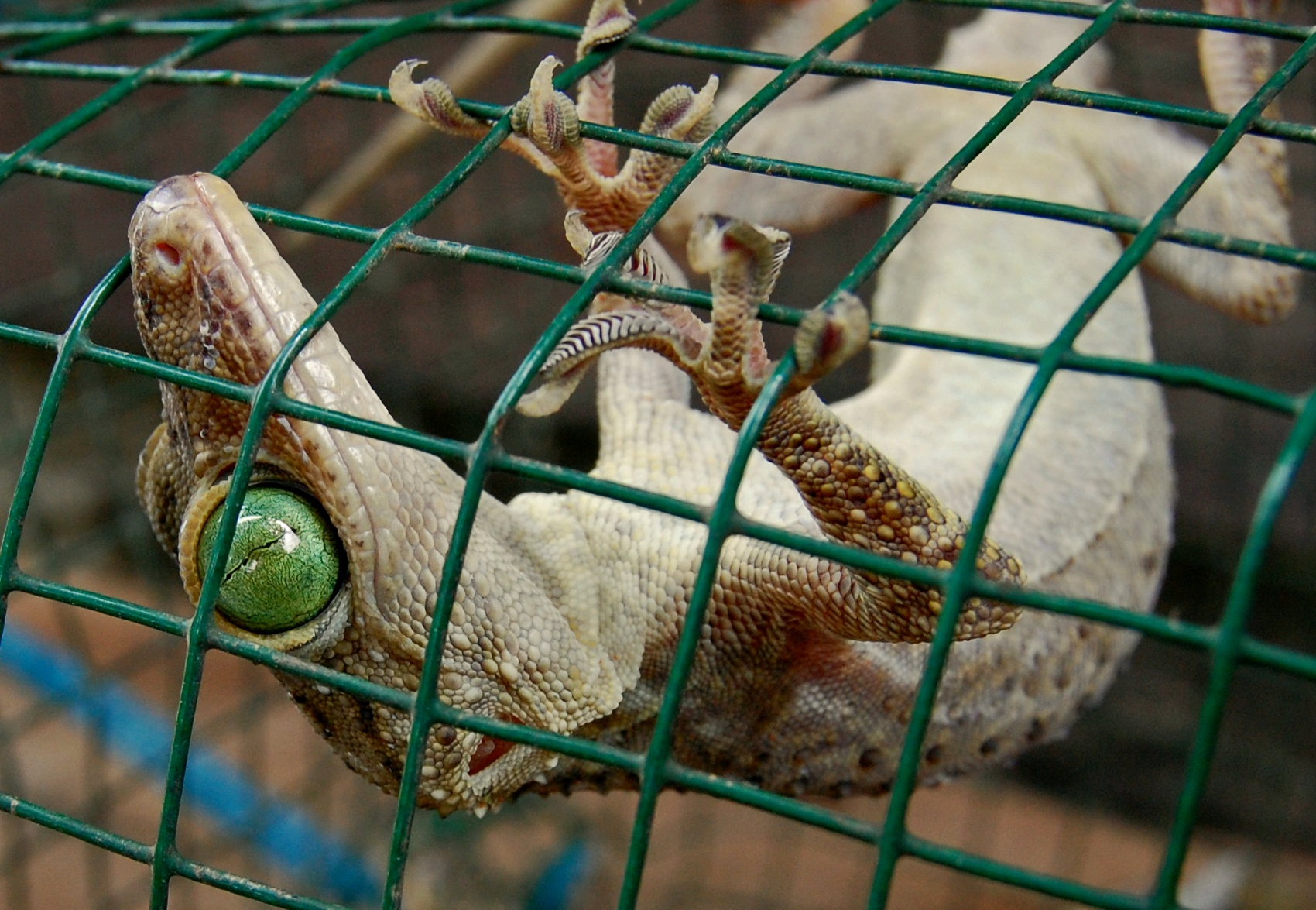
- in hunter's cage from Upper Seruyan, Central Kalimantan

Conservation status
- Least Concern (IUCN 3.1)

Scientific classification
- Kingdom: Animalia
- Phylum: Chordata
- Class: Reptilia
- Order: Squamata
- Suborder: Gekkota
- Family: Gekkonidae
- Genus: Gekko
- Species: G. smithii

Binomial name
- Gekko smithii Gray, 1842
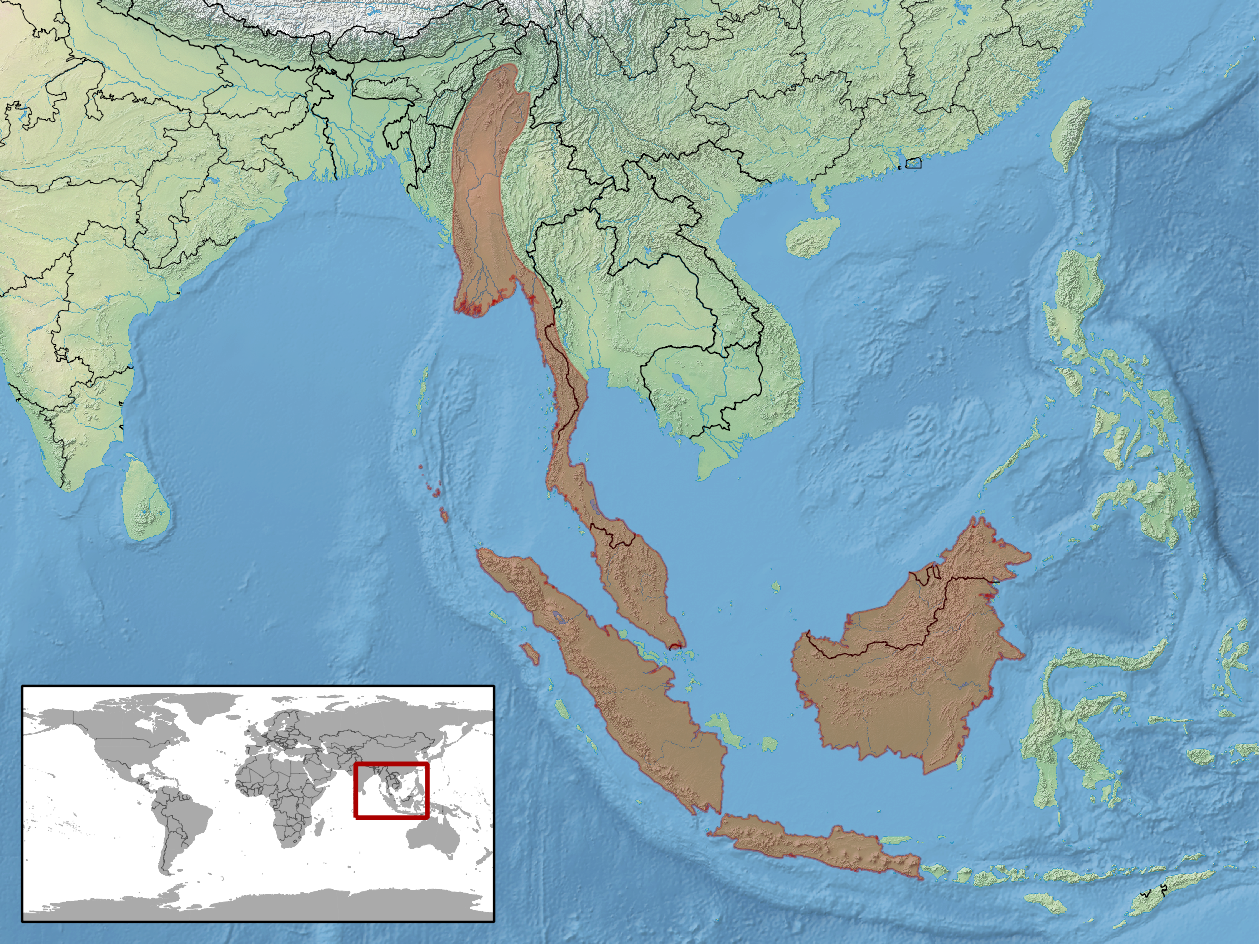

Synonyms
- Gekko smithii Gray, 1842; Platydactylus stentor Cantor, 1847; Platydactylus albomaculatus Giebel, 1861; Gecko stentor — Günther, 1864; Gecko smithii — Stoliczka, 1870; Gekko smithi — M.A. Smith, 1935; Gekko smithii — Manthey & Grossman, 1997

= Gekko smithii =

Species of lizard

Gekko smithii, commonly known as Smith's green-eyed gecko or the large forest gecko, is a species of lizard in the family Gekkonidae. The species is native to mainland Southeast Asia and Indonesia.

== Description ==
G. smithii is one of the biggest geckos, reaching a total length (including tail) of 35 cm (14 in) with a SVL of 19 cm (7.5 in)

== Etymology ==
The specific name, smithii, is in honor of Scottish zoologist Andrew Smith (1797–1872), who was the founder of the South African Museum.

== Similar species ==
Species of similar appearance include Gekko taylori and Gekko gecko, as well as Gekko verreauxii (from the Andaman and Nicobar Islands) and Gekko siamensis (from central Thailand).

== Geographic range ==
G. smithii is found in southern Thailand (Satun, Narathiwatk Pattani), Singapore, western Malaysia (Pulau Pinang, Perak, Pahang, Selangor, Pulau Tioman), Myanmar (Burma), India (Nicobar Islands), and Indonesia (Borneo, Sumatra, Pulau Nias, Java).

The type locality is "Prince of Wales' Island" (= Pulau Pinang, West Malaysia).

== Habitat ==
The preferred natural habitat of G. smithii is forest.

== Diet ==
G. smithii preys on insects, especially grasshoppers.

== Reproduction ==
The sexually mature female G. smithii lays a clutch of two eggs. The eggs are almost spherical, the average egg measuring 20 x 19 mm (0.79 x 0.75 in).
