= Sunshine Island =

Sunshine Island may refer to:

- Sunshine Island, Hong Kong
- nickname for Usedom, a Baltic Sea island in Pomerania, divided between Germany and Poland
