= Dibamus tropcentr =

Scientific classification
- Kingdom: Animalia
- Phylum: Chordata
- Class: Reptilia
- Order: Squamata
- Suborder: Dibamia
- Family: Dibamidae
- Genus: Dibamus
- Species: D. tropcentr

Binomial name
- Dibamus tropcentr Kliukin, Nguyen, Bragin ,Poyarkov, 2023

Species of reptile

Dibamus tropcentr, the Ninh Thuận blind lizard, is a species of legless lizard in the family Dibamidae and the genus Dibamus. It was discovered in 2023 in Vietnam. It is suggested to be classified as vulnerable by the IUCN.
