= Taylor's blind skink =

Scientific classification
- Kingdom: Animalia
- Phylum: Chordata
- Class: Reptilia
- Order: Squamata
- Suborder: Dibamia
- Family: Dibamidae
- Genus: Dibamus
- Species: D. taylori

Binomial name
- Dibamus taylori Greer, 1985

Species of lizard

Taylor's blind skink (Dibamus taylori), also known commonly as the Lesser Sunda blind lizard, is a species of legless lizard in the family Dibamidae. The species is endemic to the Lesser Sunda Islands.

== Etymology ==
The specific name, taylori, is in honor of American herpetologist Edward Harrison Taylor.

== Reproduction ==
D. taylori is oviparous.
