= Dibamus nicobaricum =

Scientific classification
- Kingdom: Animalia
- Phylum: Chordata
- Class: Reptilia
- Order: Squamata
- Suborder: Dibamia
- Family: Dibamidae
- Genus: Dibamus
- Species: D. nicobaricum

Binomial name
- Dibamus nicobaricum (Steindachner, 1867)

Species of lizard

Dibamus nicobaricum is a species of lizard found in the Nicobar Islands of India.

== Description ==
The snout of this lizard is conical, obtuse, and slightly projecting. It has four enlarged shields on the head besides the rostral and labial scales - a frontal, an interparietal, and an ocular on each side; the interparietal shield is the largest. The eyes are scarcely distinguishable through the ocular scale. It has a narrow, elongate, trapezoidal mental, and a very large sublabial on each side. Scales equal, 22 to 26 round the middle of the body. The preanal scales very small. Its tail is very short and obtuse. Its body is a uniform purplish-brown color.

Total body and tail length is five to eight inches.

== Distribution ==
D. nicobaricum is found on Great Nicobar Island, and probably Little Nicobar Island. The type locality is given as "Nicobar Islands".
