= Lankascincus taylori =

Conservation status
- Vulnerable (IUCN 3.1)

Scientific classification
- Kingdom: Animalia
- Phylum: Chordata
- Class: Reptilia
- Order: Squamata
- Family: Scincidae
- Genus: Lankascincus
- Species: L. taylori

Binomial name
- Lankascincus taylori Greer, 1991

Species of lizard

Lankascincus taylori, commonly known as Taylor's tree skink, is a species of lizard in the family Scincidae. The species is endemic to the island of Sri Lanka.

== Etymology ==
The specific name, taylori, is in honor of American herpetologist Edward Harrison Taylor.

== Habitat and geographic range ==
A montane representative of Lanka skinks, L. taylori is found in moist leaf litter, under stones and logs in forests, at elevations from 470–1,350 m (1,540–4,430 ft) above sea level, at Sinharaja, Knuckles Mountain Range, Gampola, Hantana, and Udawatta Kele.

== Description ==
The head, body, and tail of L. taylori are long and slender. The midbody scales are in 24-26 rows. The lamellae under the fourth toe number 12-18. The dorsum is chocolate brown. Each dorsal scale has a dark gray horseshoe mark, which is open-ended posteriorly. A dark brown flank band can be seen with blue spots. The throat is grayish with blue spots. The venter is yellow.

== Diet ==
The diet of L. taylori includes insects.

== Reproduction ==
Sexually mature females of L. taylori usually lay 2 eggs at a time.
