= Cyrtodactylus edwardtaylori =

Conservation status
- Endangered (IUCN 3.1)

Scientific classification
- Kingdom: Animalia
- Phylum: Chordata
- Class: Reptilia
- Order: Squamata
- Suborder: Gekkota
- Family: Gekkonidae
- Genus: Cyrtodactylus
- Species: C. edwardtaylori

Binomial name
- Cyrtodactylus edwardtaylori Batuwita & Bahir, 2005

Species of lizard

Cyrtodactylus edwardtaylori is a species of Asian bent-toed gecko, a lizard in the family Gekkonidae. The species, which is endemic to Sri Lanka, was originally described by Sri Lankan herpetologists Sudesh Batuwita and Mohomed M. Bahir in 2005.

== Etymology ==
The specific name, edwardtaylori, is in honor of American herpetologist Edward Harrison Taylor.

== Description ==
Cyrtodactylus edwardtaylori can grow to a snout–vent length of at least 96 mm (3.8 in). The number of scales under the fourth toe of C. edwardtaylori range from 7–8. The claws are short. The mental is subpentagonal. Midbody scales are in 29–30 rows. The head is not depressed. A preanal groove is absent.

The dorsum is light brown with dark-brown bands. There is a pale canthal stripe.

== Geographic range ==
C. edwardtaylori is known only from Badulla District at elevations of 1,000–1,800 m (3,300–5,900 ft) above sea level.

== Habitat ==
The preferred natural habitat of C. edwardtaylori is forest, but it has also been found in artificial habitats such as cardamom plantations, tea plantations, house interiors, and under bridges.

== Behavior ==
C. edwardtaylori is nocturnal and arboreal, usually found on tree trunks at heights of 2–4 m (6.6–13.1 ft) above the ground.

== Reproduction ==
C. edwardtaylori is oviparous.
