= Tsing Chau Tsai Peninsula =

- Traditional Chinese: 青洲仔半島
- Simplified Chinese: 青洲仔半岛
- Cantonese Yale: tsīng jāu dzái bun dóu
Transcriptions
Standard Mandarin
- Hanyu Pinyin: Qīng Zhōu Zǎi Bàndǎo
Yue: Cantonese
- Yale Romanization: tsīng jāu dzái bun dóu
- Jyutping: ceng1 zau1 zai2 bun3 dou2

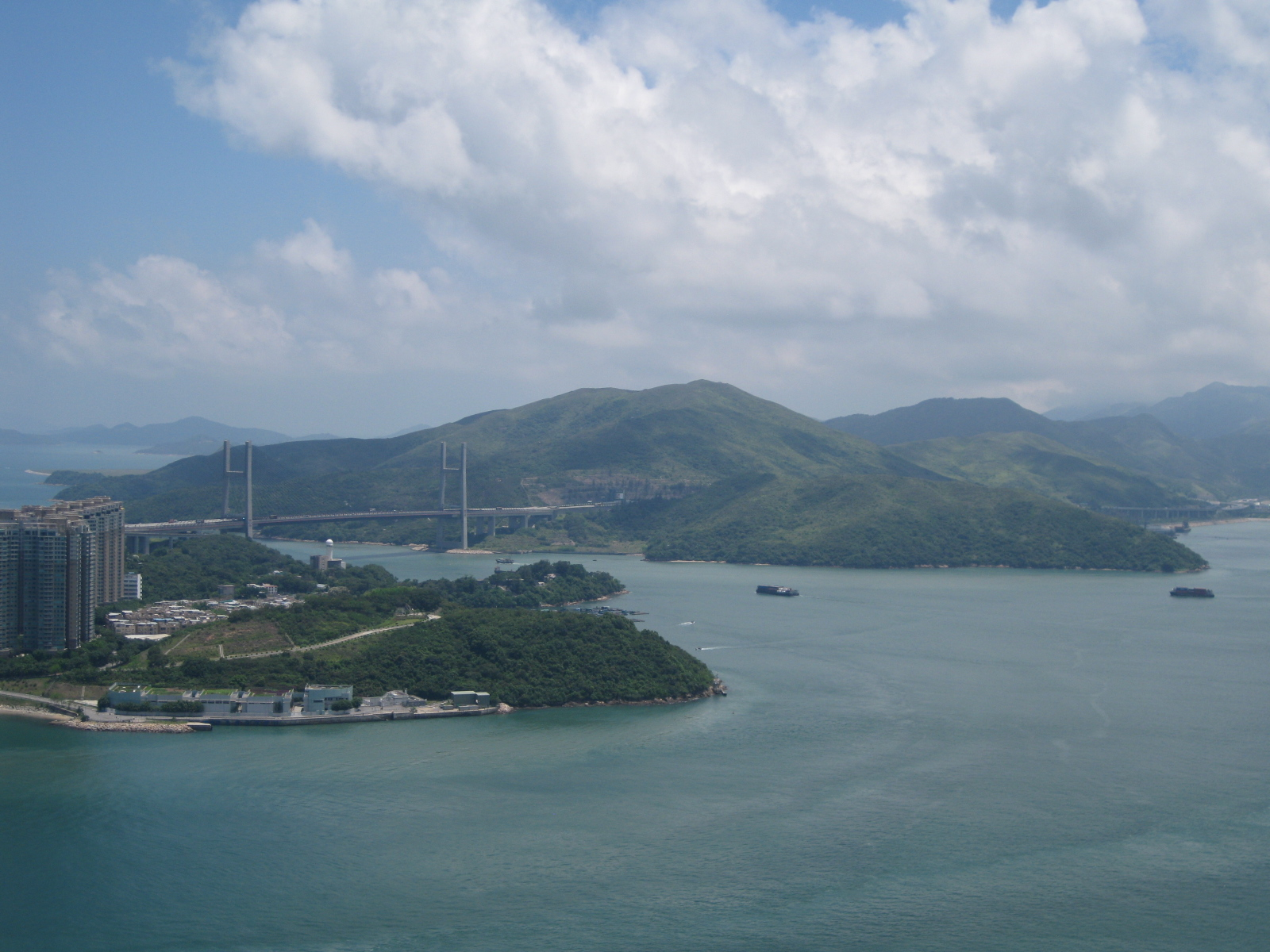
Ma Wan (foreground left) connected to the Tsing Chau Tsai Peninsula by the Kap Shui Mun Bridge across Kap Shui Mun.

Tsing Chau Tsai Peninsula (Chinese: 青洲仔半島; Jyutping: ceng1 zau1 zai2 bun3 dou2) is a peninsula located at the northeast of Lantau Island, New Territories, Hong Kong, including Yam O, To Kau Wan, Tai Tsing Chau, Tsing Chau Tsai and Penny's Bay.

== Administration ==
Tsing Chau Tsai Peninsula administratively belongs to Tsuen Wan District, while the remaining areas of Lantau Island belong to Islands District. It is an exclave and it is only connected by Kap Shui Mun Bridge with other part of Tsuen Wan District, like Ma Wan.

== Features ==
A few areas in there have been developed. Sunny Bay station is constructed at the reclaimed land of Yam O to act as an interchange between Tung Chung line and Disneyland Resort line of MTR. Hong Kong Disneyland Resort is built at the reclaimed land of Penny's Bay, formerly the shipyard area. According to the Northeast Lantau Outline Zoning Plan issued by the Hong Kong SAR Government, Container Terminal 10 and 11 may be built in the south of the peninsula.

== Villages ==
Tsing Chau Tsai Peninsula is or was the location of several villages, including:

- Fa Peng
- Luk Keng Village
- Pa Tau Kwu
- Ta Pang Po
- Tai Chuen
- Tso Wan (草灣)
