= Lankascincus sameerai =

Scientific classification
- Kingdom: Animalia
- Phylum: Chordata
- Class: Reptilia
- Order: Squamata
- Family: Scincidae
- Genus: Lankascincus
- Species: L. sameerai

Binomial name
- Lankascincus sameerai Kanishka, Danushka & Amarasinghe, 2020

Species of lizard

Lankascincus sameerai, commonly known as Sameera's lanka skink, is a species of lizard in the family Scincidae. The species is endemic to the island of Sri Lanka.

== Taxonomy ==
L. sameerai most closely resembles L. gansi and L. merrill.

== Habitat and ecology ==
L. sameerai was first discovered from submontane forest patches in Morningside, Matara. It is a diurnal skink commonly found under leaf litter on the forest floor.
