= Lankascincus merrill =

Scientific classification
- Kingdom: Animalia
- Phylum: Chordata
- Class: Reptilia
- Order: Squamata
- Family: Scincidae
- Genus: Lankascincus
- Species: L. merrill

Binomial name
- Lankascincus merrill L. Wickramasinghe, Vidanapathirana & N. Wickramasinghe, 2020

Species of lizard

Lankascincus merrill, also known commonly as Merrill's lanka skink, is a species of lizard in the family Scincidae. The species is endemic to Sri Lanka.

== Etymology ==
The specific name, merrill, is in honor of Sri Lankan tea executive Merrill J. Fernando for his support of biodiversity conservation.
