= Dibamus novaeguineae =

Conservation status
- Least Concern (IUCN 3.1)

Scientific classification
- Kingdom: Animalia
- Phylum: Chordata
- Class: Reptilia
- Order: Squamata
- Suborder: Dibamia
- Family: Dibamidae
- Genus: Dibamus
- Species: D. novaeguineae

Binomial name
- Dibamus novaeguineae A.M.C. Duméril and Bibron, 1839

Synonyms
- Acontias subcaecus Duméril & Bibron, 1839; Typhlina ludekingi Bleeker, 1860; Thyphloscincus martensii Peters, 1864; Dibamus novae-guineae Boulenger, 1897

Species of lizard

Dibamus novaeguineae, is a legless lizard found in the Philippines, Indonesia, and Malaysia.

== Distribution and habitat ==
Dibamus novaeguineae exhibits a broad insular distribution across maritime Southeast Asia. In the Philippines, its range includes several islands in the southern region of the archipelago, notably Basilan, Cebu, Negros, Palawan, Camiguin, and Mindanao—where it has been specifically documented on Mount Malindang—as well as the Sulu Archipelago islands of Tawi-Tawi, Bongao, Papahag, and Inampulupan. In Indonesia, the species is known from the northern, central, and southwestern parts of Sulawesi, the Moluccan islands of Ternate, Halmahera, and Lembeh, and extends eastward into western New Guinea.

Dibamus novaeguineae is a fossorial legless lizard, and individuals are typically found under stones, within or beneath rotting logs, and in leaf litter of rainforest floors. This species inhabits a wide range of forested environments, including both primary and secondary rainforest, forest margins, dipterocarp forest, secondary growth forest, wooded grasslands, and agricultural landscapes such as abaca and coconut plantations.

It has been recorded at elevations ranging from 15 to 909 meters above sea level. In the Komodo Island, specimens are generally associated with moist forest habitats above 400 meters, though some individuals have been found at lower elevations in gallery forests that extend downward as cooler, moist extensions of higher-elevation rainforest.

== Description ==
Specimens of Dibamus novaeguineae from Flores and Sumbawa had 22 midbody scale rows, whereas specimens from Lombok exhibited 20–24 scale rows, indicating significant geographic variation. Among specimens collected from Komodo Island, two males had 24 midbody scale rows, while the third male and one female had 22. One male (snout–vent length [SVL] 129 mm, tail 21 mm) was uniformly brownish-purple dorsally and ventrally, with only the enlarged head scales and perianal region being slightly lighter. Another male (92 mm SVL, 18 mm tail) had a similar coloration but featured lighter spots on the belly. The third male (86 mm SVL, 13 mm tail) had a few scattered light spots over the body and a pale band around the midsection. The female (132 mm SVL, 16 mm tail) was similarly colored, but the belly was mottled with lighter tones, and two broad bands of this lighter shade encircled the anterior half of the body.
