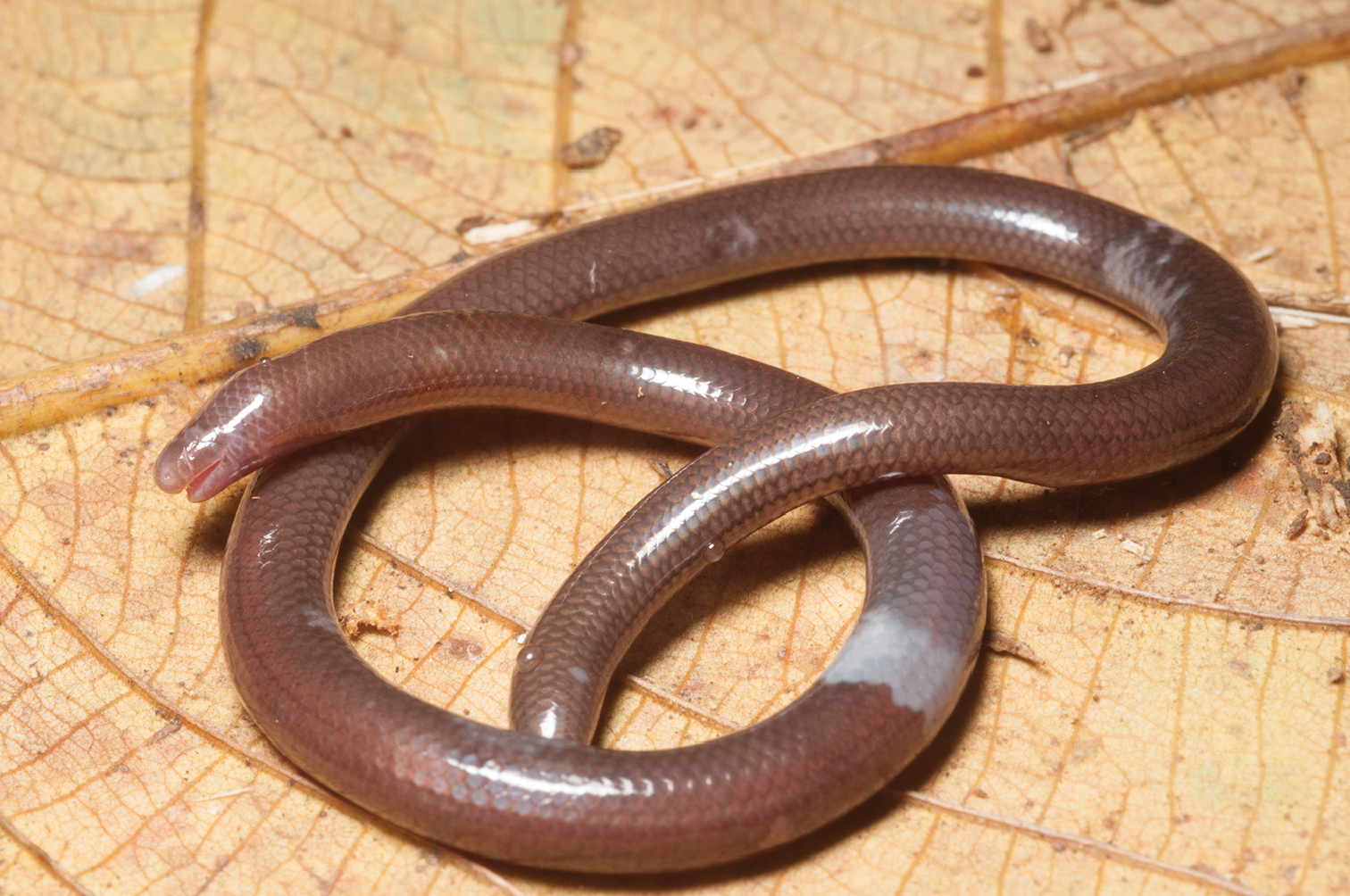

Scientific classification
- Kingdom: Animalia
- Phylum: Chordata
- Class: Reptilia
- Order: Squamata
- Suborder: Dibamia
- Family: Dibamidae
- Genus: Dibamus
- Species: D. leucurus

Binomial name
- Dibamus leucurus (Bleeker, 1860)

Synonyms
- Typhlina leucurus Bleeker, 1860; Dibamus argenteus Taylor, 1915

= White blind skink =

Species of lizard

The white blind skink (Dibamus leucurus) is a legless lizard found in Indonesia and the Philippines.
