= Sunshine Island, Hong Kong =

Island in Hong Kong

Sunshine Island
日光島
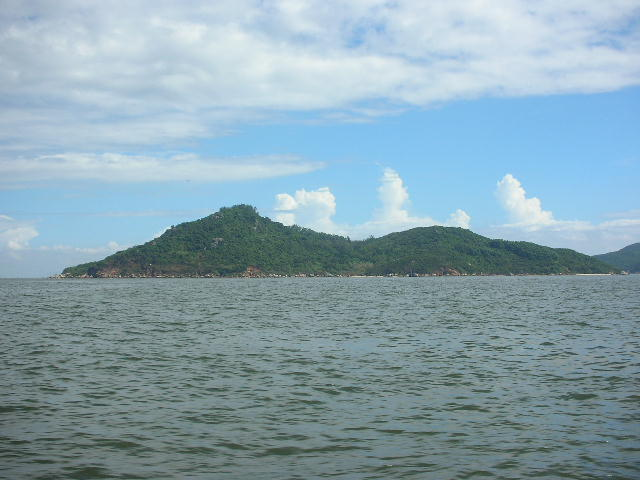

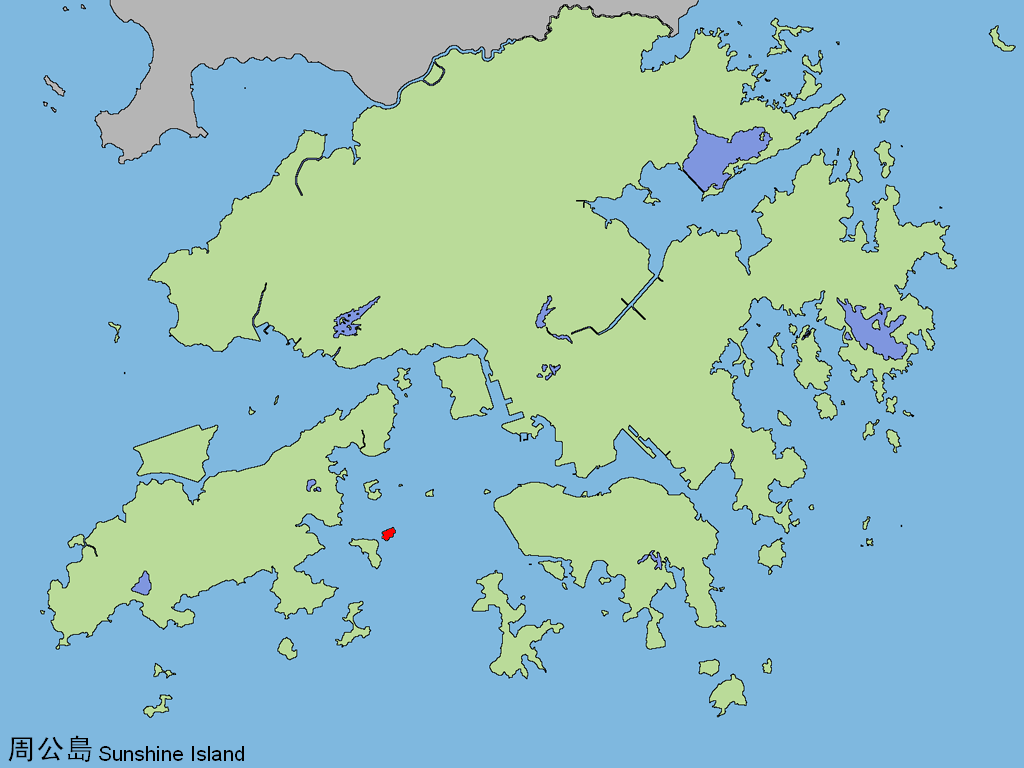
- Map showing the location of Sunshine Island in Hong Kong

Geography
- Coordinates: 22.261111°N 114.051389°E
- Area: 0.54 km^{2} (0.21 sq mi)
- Length: 3.1 km (1.93 mi)

Administration
- Hong Kong

Sunshine Island, Hong Kong
- Traditional Chinese: 日光島
- Simplified Chinese: 日光岛
Transcriptions
Standard Mandarin
- Hanyu Pinyin: Rìguāngdǎo
Yue: Cantonese
- Yale Romanization: Yaht gwōng dóu
- Jyutping: Jat^{6} gwong^{1} dou^{2}

Alternative Chinese name
- Traditional Chinese: 晨曦島
- Simplified Chinese: 晨曦岛
Transcriptions
Standard Mandarin
- Hanyu Pinyin: Chénxī
Yue: Cantonese
- Yale Romanization: Sàhn hēi dóu
- Jyutping: San^{4} hei^{1} dou^{2}

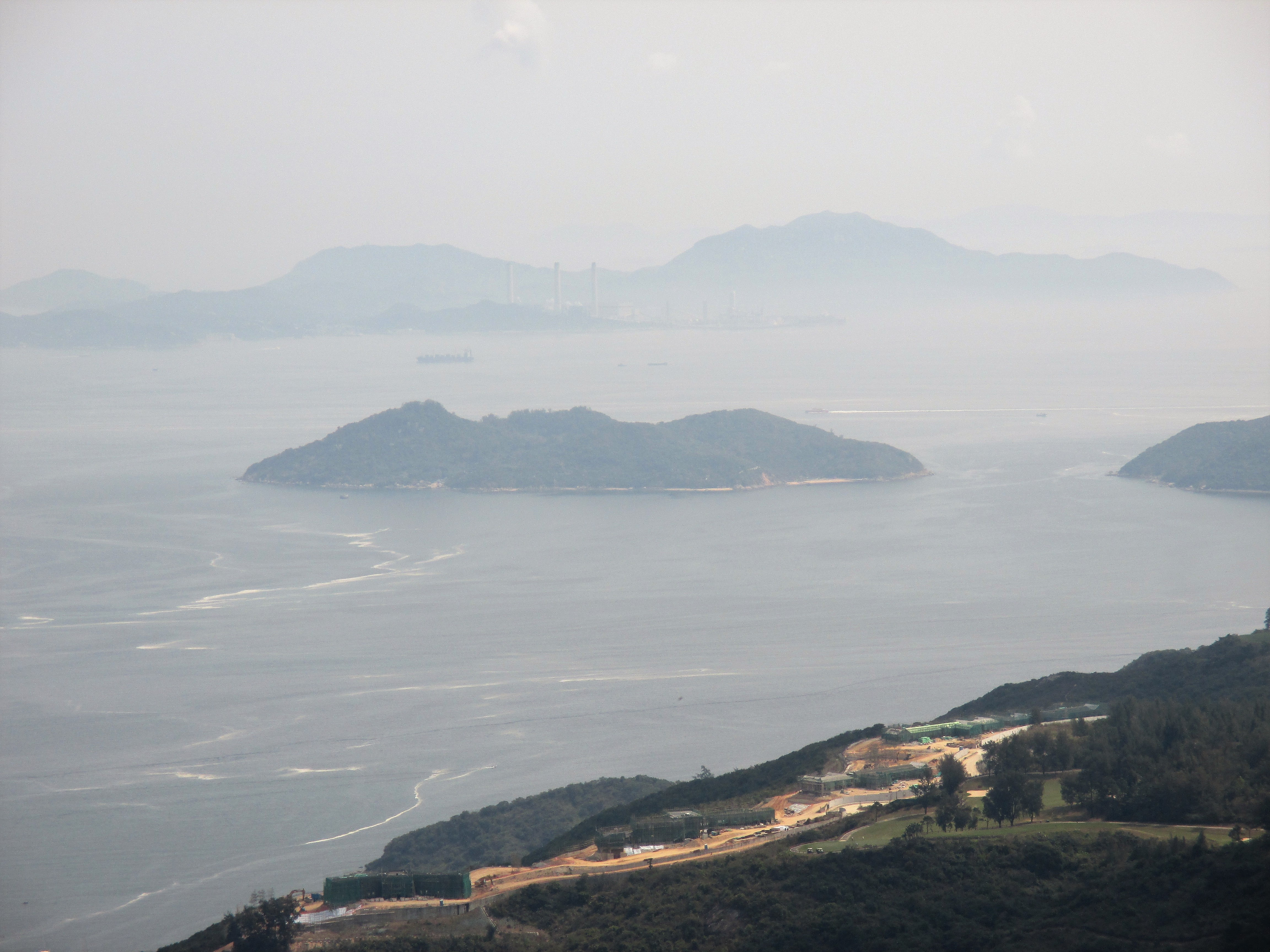
Sunshine Island viewed from Lantau Island

Sunshine Island (Chinese: 日光島), also known as Chau Kung To (周公島) indigenously, is a companion island of Hei Ling Chau in Hong Kong. Located northeast of Hei Ling Chau and south of Peng Chau, the island was once the site of a drug addiction treatment centre. The island features scenic rocks and some abandoned buildings. It has only one inhabitant, a 78-year-old named Lam Chi-ngai, and there is no public transport to the island.

== History ==
Friend (Quaker) Gus Borgeest, born in Ningbo in 1909, gave the island its English name and founded an audacious and successful resettlement and rehabilitation centre for Chinese refugees on Sunshine island in 1952. At the time opium addiction was endemic among many Chinese and the model farming community founded by Borgeest provided many mainland refugees and addicts in Hong Kong with a second chance. Borgeest's method was to provide land, housing, tools, seeds, training and assistance to refugees and give them the opportunity to each start a small farm on the island. The opportunity provided by Borgeest's project helped many refugee families re-establish themselves after the trauma of fleeing to Hong Kong. On a May 1956 visit to Sunshine Island one of the resettled refugees expressed the success of the project to then Hong Kong Governor Sir Alexander Grantham: "Sir, owning one's own land, managing one's own affairs, does something to a man. Such cannot be achieved, or even understood, by those who are content to let the government fill their rice bowls for them." For this work, Borgeest was awarded the 1961 Ramon Magsaysay Prize, also known colloquially as "Asia's Nobel Prize". The work of the Sunshine Island community was supported by The Religious Society of Friends (Quakers) in Hong Kong. Sunshine Island formed the basis of later drug rehabilitation settlements still existing in Hong Kong.

== Fauna ==
After the construction of Hong Kong Disneyland, white-bellied sea eagles moved from their habitat in Pa Tau Kwu (扒頭鼓) of Lantau Island to Sunshine Island. There is also an endemic species, the Bogadek's legless lizard (Dibamus bogadeki) living on the island.

== See also ==
- List of islands and peninsulas of Hong Kong
- Outlying Islands
