= Dibamus tiomanensis =

Scientific classification
- Kingdom: Animalia
- Phylum: Chordata
- Class: Reptilia
- Order: Squamata
- Suborder: Dibamia
- Family: Dibamidae
- Genus: Dibamus
- Species: D. tiomanensis

Binomial name
- Dibamus tiomanensis Diaz et al., 2004

Species of lizard

Dibamus tiomanensis, or the Tioman Island blind lizard, is a legless lizard endemic to Tioman Island in Malaysia. These lizards can reach 12.3 cm (4.8 in) in snout–vent length. A distinguishing characteristic of this species is that they are brown in color with a lighter brown/tan color on their snout and jaw.
