= Dibamus deharvengi =

Conservation status
- Data Deficient (IUCN 3.1)

Scientific classification
- Kingdom: Animalia
- Phylum: Chordata
- Class: Reptilia
- Order: Squamata
- Suborder: Dibamia
- Family: Dibamidae
- Genus: Dibamus
- Species: D. deharvengi

Binomial name
- Dibamus deharvengi Ineich, 1999

Species of lizard

Dibamus deharvengi is a legless lizard. It endemic to Vietnam and only known from its type locality in Binh Châu forest, Bà Rịa–Vũng Tàu province. The locality is a dipterocarp forest in the Binh Chau–Phuoc Buu Nature Reserve.

Dibamus deharvengi is named after the collector of the holotype. Louis Deharveng.
