= Gus Borgeest =

Gus Borgeest (born 1 October 1909) was a Chinese-born British resident of Hong Kong who established a camp for refugees on Sunshine Island. He was also winner of the Ramon Magsaysay Award in 1961.

Borgeest was born in Ningbo, China. In 1951 he fled the Communist Revolution to Hong Kong with his Chinese wife Mona and only two Hong Kong dollars.

== See also ==
- List of Ramon Magsaysay Award winners
