= To Kau Wan =

Industrial site on north shore of Lantau Island

Coordinates: 22.4942°N 114.1311°E

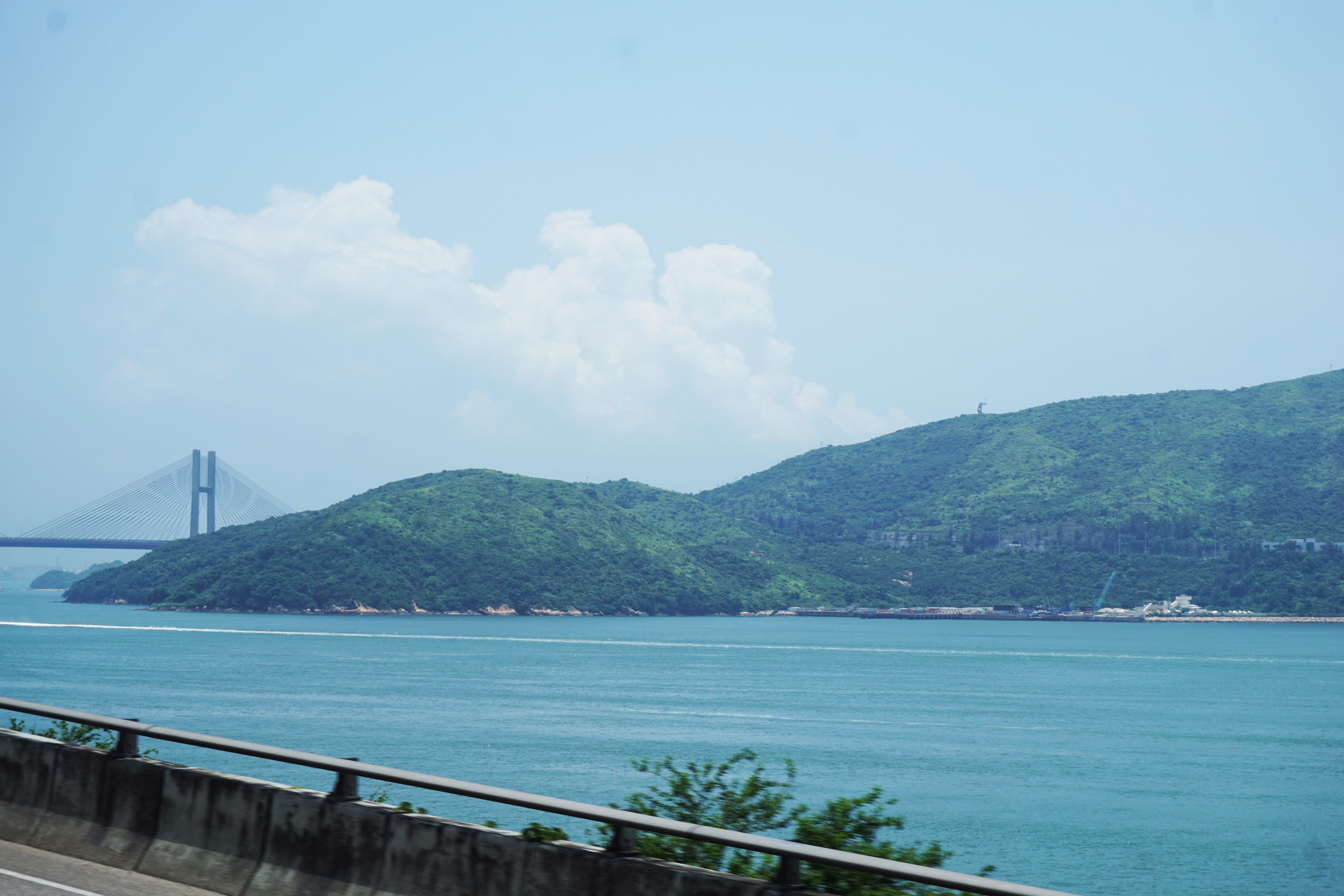
To Kau Wan

To Kau Wan (Chinese: 倒扣灣) is a site on the north shore of northeast Lantau Island, Hong Kong. It provides convenient access to Hong Kong International Airport, as well as a pier that accommodates barges.

In the early 21st century, To Kau Wan was used as a soil decontamination site. Contaminated soil from Cheoy Lee Shipyard at Penny's Bay was transported to a plant in To Kau Wan for cement solidification, a process which was completed in early 2003. From mid-2003, soil contaminated with total petroleum hydrocarbon (TPH) and semi-volatile organic compounds (SVOC) was treated there using microorganisms for biopiling.

In October 2025, the fuselage and tail section of the Boeing 747-400 freight airplane, which crashed while operating as Emirates SkyCargo Flight 9788, were transported to To Kau Wan.

== See also ==
- Tsing Chau Tsai Peninsula
