= Mountain blind skink =

Scientific classification
- Kingdom: Animalia
- Phylum: Chordata
- Class: Reptilia
- Order: Squamata
- Suborder: Dibamia
- Family: Dibamidae
- Genus: Dibamus
- Species: D. montanus

Binomial name
- Dibamus montanus M. A. Smith, 1921

Species of lizard

The mountain blind skink (Dibamus montanus) is a legless lizard endemic to Vietnam.
