= Fa Peng =

Coordinates: 22.330028°N 114.05588°E

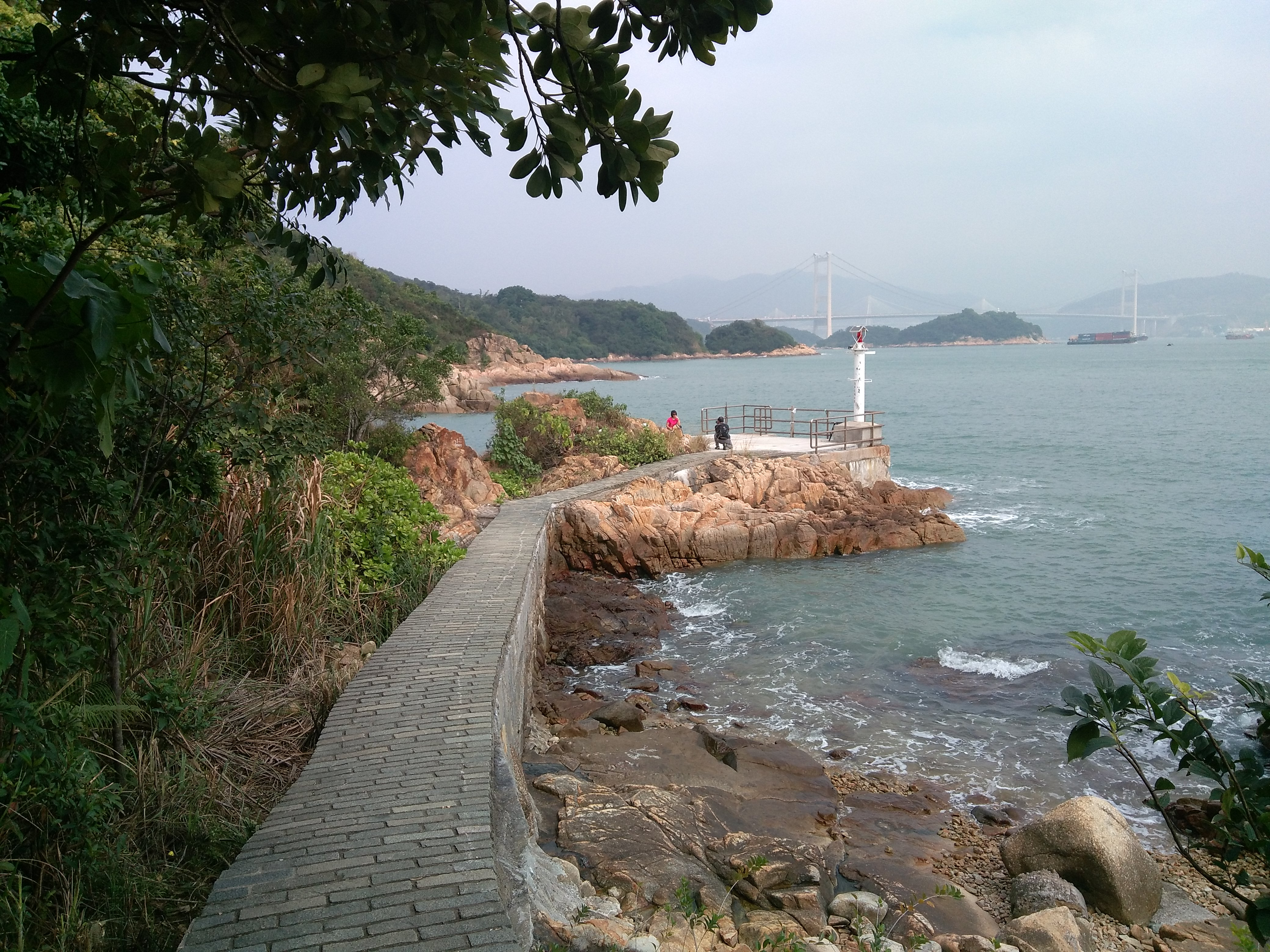
Pier at Fa Peng.

Fa Peng (Chinese: 花坪) is a village located on the Tsing Chau Tsai Peninsula of Lantau Island, in the Tsuen Wan District of Hong Kong. The village is below Fa Peng Teng (Fa Peng Peak), in Chinese meaning flower flask because of the rock formation that’s shaped like a flower flask. Climbing this via the Fa Peng Trail provides one of the best views of the Lantau Link bridges.

== Administration ==
Fa Peng is a recognized village under the New Territories Small House Policy.
