= Jarujin Nabhitabhata =

Thai zoologist and herpetologist

- จารุจินต์ นภีตะภัฏ
- Born: 22 January 1949; Bangkok, Thailand
- Died: 12 September 2008 (aged 59)
- Education: Kasetsart University
- Known for: Taxonomic research, discovery of new species
- Scientific career
- Fields: Biology, Zoology, Taxonomy
- Workplaces: National Science Museum, Thailand

Jarujin Nabhitabhata (22 January 1949 – 12 September 2008) was a Thai biologist, zoologist, and taxonomist. He served as director of the Natural History Museum under the National Science Museum (Thailand).

== Biography ==
Jarujin Nabhitabhata was born on 22 January 1949 along the Bang Sue Canal in Phra Nakhon Province. He graduated from Vajiravudh College and earned a master's degree in Entomology from Kasetsart University. He developed an early interest in living organisms. While studying for his master's, he worked with Dr. Bunsong Lekagul. After graduation, he joined the Thailand Institute of Scientific and Technological Research. Nabhitabhata conducted taxonomic research across various groups, including plants, insects, birds, fish, reptiles, and amphibians. He published research and compiled catalogs of Thailand’s biodiversity, discovering several new species, some of which were named in his honor. His final position was director of the Natural History Museum of the National Science Museum under the Ministry of Science and Technology (Thailand). His last project, unfinished due to his sudden death, was a book compiling all bird species of Thailand, titled Birds of Thailand.

He was married to Mrs. Jirapha Nabhitabhata, with one son and one daughter. Jarujin Nabhitabhata died suddenly on 12 September 2008 during eyelid surgery at a clinic on Phetchaburi Road; his heart stopped unexpectedly on the operating table despite anesthesia and sedatives.

== Species named in his honor ==
- Liphistius jarujini Ono, 1988 — a small spider found in southern Thailand
- Cyrtodactylus jarujini (Ulber, 1992) — a cave-dwelling gecko from Nong Khai Province
- Beccumon jarujini (Ng & Naiyanetr, 1993) — a freshwater crab from northern Thailand
- Paraboysidia nabhitabhatai Panha & Burch, 2001 — a small trumpet snail
- Coniocompsa nabhitabhatai Sziraki, 2002 — an earwig from the Sakaerat Environmental Research Station, Nakhon Ratchasima Province
- Platyroptilon jarujin Papp in Papp, Merz & M. Földvári, 2006 — a fly from Khao Chong Botanical Garden, Trang Province
- Rhacophorus jarujini Matsui & Panha, 2006 — a tree frog from northeastern Thailand
- Trichogalumna nabhitabhatai Mahunka, 2008 — a mite from Sakaerat Environmental Research Station, Nakhon Ratchasima Province
- Limnonectes jarujini Matsui, Panha, Khonsue & Kuraishi, 2010 — a southern Thai frog species
