= Dibamus greeri =

Conservation status
- Least Concern (IUCN 3.1)

Scientific classification
- Kingdom: Animalia
- Phylum: Chordata
- Class: Reptilia
- Order: Squamata
- Suborder: Dibamia
- Family: Dibamidae
- Genus: Dibamus
- Species: D. greeri

Binomial name
- Dibamus greeri Darevsky, 1992

Species of lizard

Dibamus greeri, also known commonly as Greer's blind skink, is a species of legless lizard in the family Dibamidae. The species is endemic to Vietnam.

== Etymology ==
The specific name, greeri, is in honor of Australian herpetologist Allen Eddy Greer.

== Ecology and reproduction ==
D. greeri is a fossorial species occurring in both primary and secondary forest. It is oviparous.
