= Flower's blind lizard =

Scientific classification
- Kingdom: Animalia
- Phylum: Chordata
- Class: Reptilia
- Order: Squamata
- Suborder: Dibamia
- Family: Dibamidae
- Genus: Dibamus
- Species: D. floweri

Binomial name
- Dibamus floweri Quah, Anuar, Grismer & Grassby-Lewis, 2017

Species of legless lizard

Flower's blind lizard (Dibamus floweri) is a legless lizard endemic to peninsular Malaysia. It is between 8–13 cm (3.1–5.1 in) long and is gray-brown in color with a lighter ventral surface and a silver-gray band. It burrows beneath rocks, leaf-litter and rotting logs.

== Description ==
Flowers's blind lizard is a legless lizard with a wormlike body and smooth scales. Its snout is rounded, the eyes are covered by scales, and it lacks external ear openings. It is gray-brown in color with a lighter ventral surface and a wide silver-gray band.

There are a few differences between the sexes, such as males being approximately 13 cm (5.1 in) long and females being approximately 8 cm (3.1 in) long and males having a larger number of scales. The main external difference is the absence of two short, flattened hindlimbs in females.

== Distribution and habitat ==
Flower's blind lizard has so far only been found on Mount Korbu, on Fraser's Hill, Malaysia between heights of 1,207 and 1,500m. It can be found burrowing beneath rotting logs, leaf-litter and rocks.

== Taxonomy and etymology ==
Flower's blind lizard was named in honour of Major Stanley Smyth Flower. It was first described in 2017. The holotype was discovered while digging through leaf litter. It was the 23rd species of Dibamus that was discovered, and the first montane species of Dibamus.

== Behavior ==
When threatened Flower's blind lizard will flare up the scales on its body, so it appears to be covered in bristles. This might be an attempt to look similar to inedible earthworms.
