= Dibamus booliati =

Conservation status
- Data Deficient (IUCN 3.1)

Scientific classification
- Kingdom: Animalia
- Phylum: Chordata
- Class: Reptilia
- Order: Squamata
- Suborder: Dibamia
- Family: Dibamidae
- Genus: Dibamus
- Species: D. booliati

Binomial name
- Dibamus booliati Das & Yaakob, 2003

Species of lizard

Dibamus booliati, sometimes known as Boo Liat's blind lizard, is a legless lizard endemic to Peninsular Malaysia.
