= Dibamus dalaiensis =

Scientific classification
- Kingdom: Animalia
- Phylum: Chordata
- Class: Reptilia
- Order: Squamata
- Suborder: Dibamia
- Family: Dibamidae
- Genus: Dibamus
- Species: D. dalaiensis

Binomial name
- Dibamus dalaiensis Neang et al., 2011

Species of lizard

Dibamus dalaiensis is a legless lizard endemic to Cambodia.
