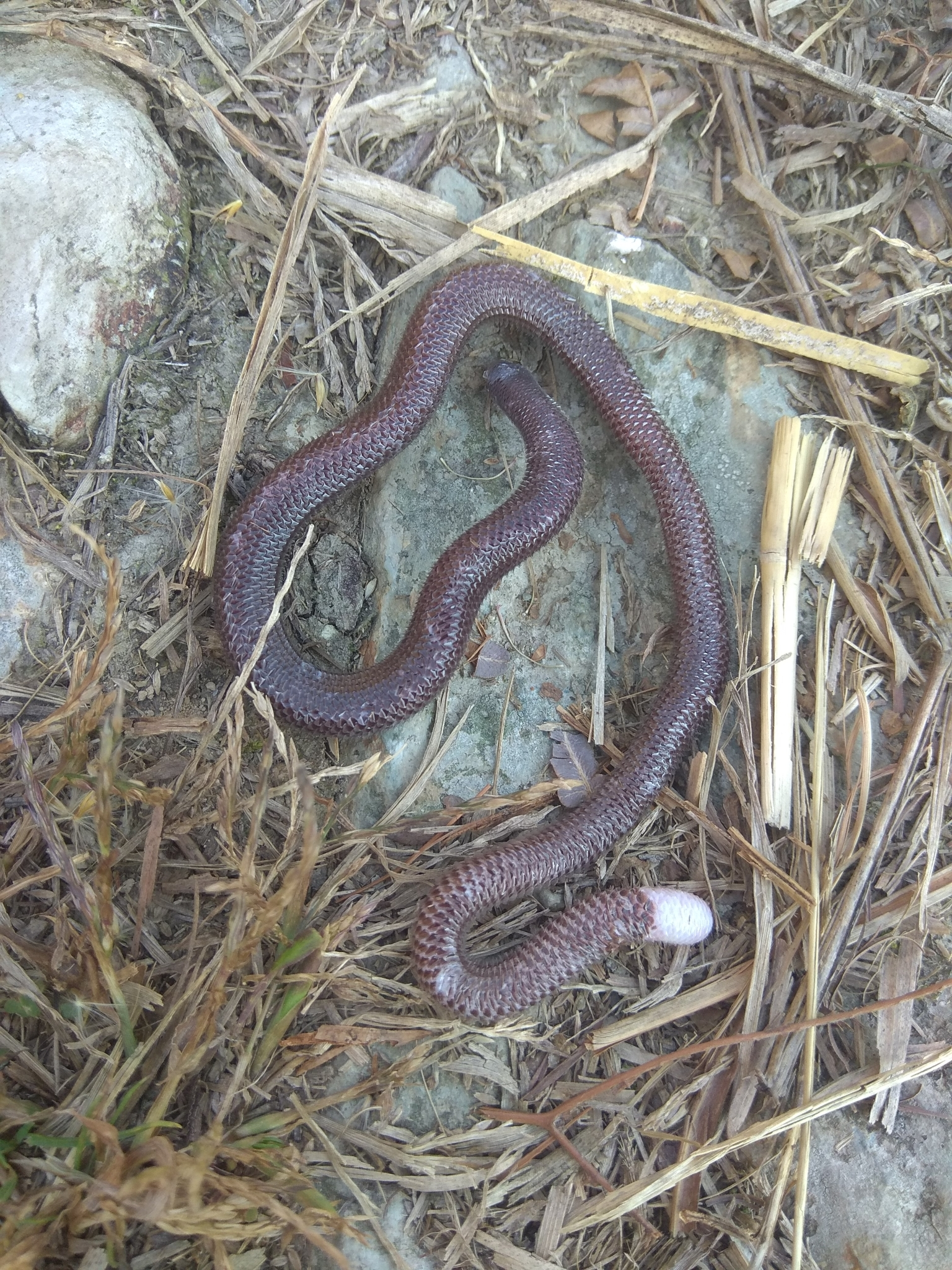

Conservation status
- Least Concern (IUCN 3.1)

Scientific classification
- Kingdom: Animalia
- Phylum: Chordata
- Class: Reptilia
- Order: Squamata
- Suborder: Dibamia
- Family: Dibamidae
- Genus: Dibamus
- Species: D. bourreti

Binomial name
- Dibamus bourreti Angel, 1935

= Dibamus bourreti =

Species of lizard

Dibamus bourreti, also known commonly as Bourret's blind skink, the white-tailed dibamid, or the white-tailed worm-like lizard, is a species of legless lizard in the family Dibamidae. The species is endemic to Asia.

== Etymology ==
The specific name, bourreti, is in honor of French herpetologist René Léon Bourret.

== Geographic range ==
D. bourreti is found in China and Vietnam.

== Habitat ==
The preferred natural habitat of D. bourreti is forest, at altitudes of 100–900 m (330–2,950 ft).

== Behavior ==
D. bourreti is terrestrial and fossorial.

== Reproduction ==
D. bourreti is oviparous.
