= Dibamus celebensis =

Scientific classification
- Kingdom: Animalia
- Phylum: Chordata
- Class: Reptilia
- Order: Squamata
- Suborder: Dibamia
- Family: Dibamidae
- Genus: Dibamus
- Species: D. celebensis

Binomial name
- Dibamus celebensis Schlegel, 1858

Species of lizard

Dibamus celebensis is a legless lizard endemic to Sulawesi.
