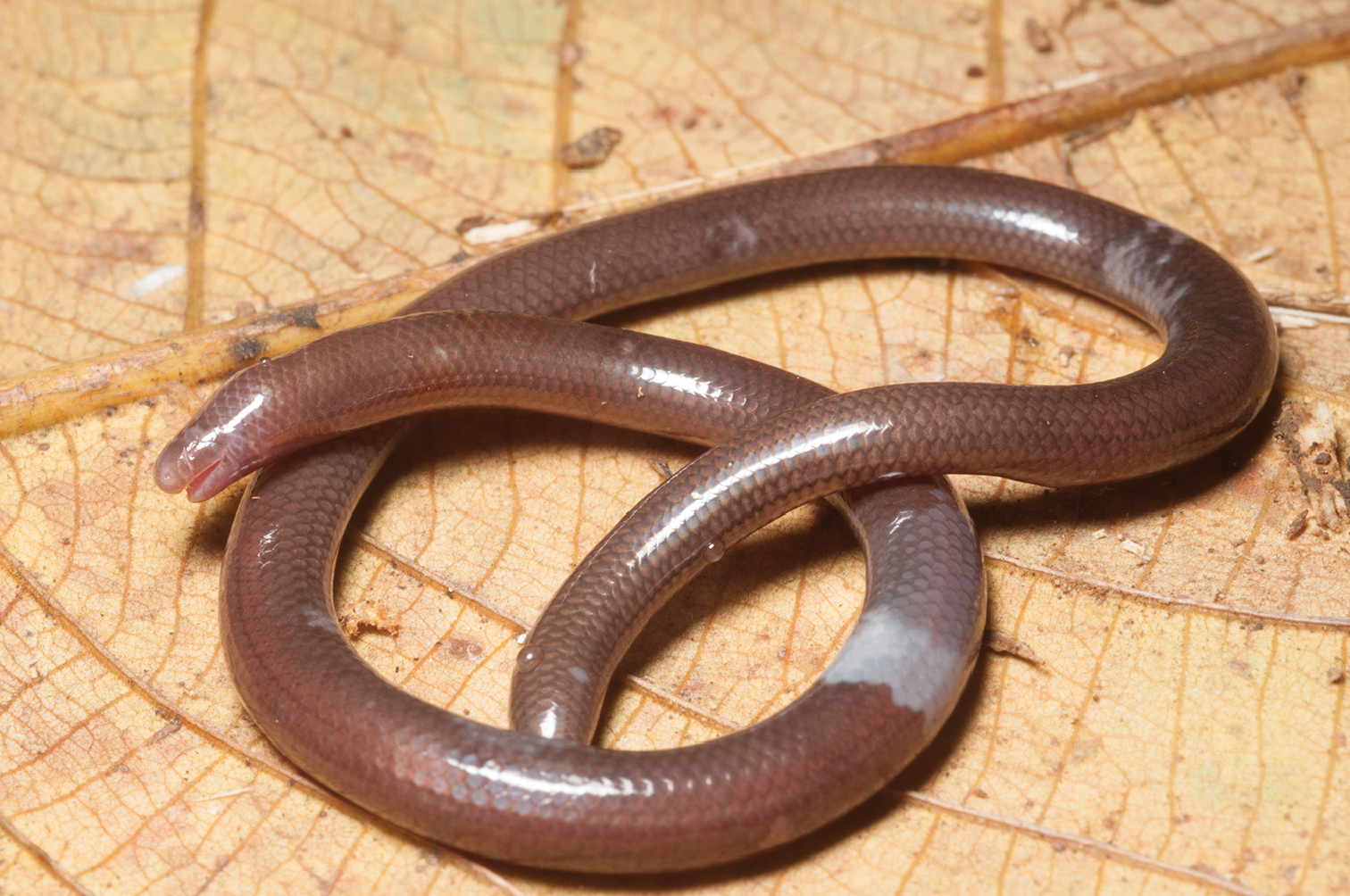
- Dibamus leucurus

Scientific classification
- Kingdom: Animalia
- Phylum: Chordata
- Class: Reptilia
- Order: Squamata
- Suborder: Dibamia
- Family: Dibamidae
- Genus: Dibamus; A.M.C. Duméril & Bibron, 1839

= Dibamus =

Genus of lizards

Dibamus is a genus of legless lizards in the family Dibamidae.

== Etymology ==
Greek δίβαμος dibamos "two-footed, on two legs".

== Species ==
The following 24 species are recognized as being valid.

- Dibamus alfredi Taylor, 1962 – Alfred's blind skink, Alfred's dibamid lizard, Alfred's limbless skink
- Dibamus bogadeki Darevsky, 1992
- Dibamus booliati Das & Yaakob, 2003 – Boo Liat's blind lizard
- Dibamus bourreti Angel, 1935 – Bourret's blind skink
- Dibamus celebensis Schlegel, 1858
- Dibamus dalaiensis Neang, Holden, Eastoe, Seng, Ith & L. Grismer, 2011
- Dibamus deharvengi Ineich, 1999
- Dibamus dezwaani Das & Lim, 2005
- Dibamus floweri Quah, Anuar, L. Grismer & Grassby-Lewis, 2017 – Flowers's blind lizard
- Dibamus greeri Darevsky, 1992 – Greer's blind skink
- Dibamus ingeri Das & Lim, 2003
- Dibamus kondaoensis Honda, Ota, Hikida & Darevsky, 2001
- Dibamus leucurus (Bleeker, 1860) – white blind skink
- Dibamus manadotuaensis Koppetsch, Böhme & Koch, 2019
- Dibamus montanus M.A. Smith, 1921 – mountain blind skink
- Dibamus nicobaricum Steindachner, 1867
- Dibamus novaeguineae A.M.C. Duméril & Bibron, 1839
- Dibamus oetamai Prasetyo et al., 2025 – Buton blind skink
- Dibamus seramensis Greer, 1985 – Seram blind skink
- Dibamus smithi Greer, 1985 – Smith's blind skink
- Dibamus somsaki Honda, Nabhitabhata, Ota & Hikida, 1997 – Somsak's blind lizard, Somsak's dibamid lizard
- Dibamus taylori Greer, 1985 – Lesser Sunda blind lizard, Taylor's blind skink
- Dibamus tebal Das & Lim, 2009
- Dibamus tiomanensis Díaz, Leong, L. Grismer & Yaakob, 2004 – Tioman Island blind lizard
- Dibamus tropcentr Kliukin, Nguyen, Bragin & Poyarkov in Kliukin et al., 2023 – Ninh Thuận blind lizard
- Dibamus vorisi Das & Lim, 2003

Note: A binomial authority in parentheses indicates that the species was originally described in a genus other than Dibamus.
