= Dibamus kondaoensis =

Scientific classification
- Kingdom: Animalia
- Phylum: Chordata
- Class: Reptilia
- Order: Squamata
- Suborder: Dibamia
- Family: Dibamidae
- Genus: Dibamus
- Species: D. kondaoensis

Binomial name
- Dibamus kondaoensis Honda et al., 2001

Species of lizard

Dibamus kondaoensis is a legless lizard endemic to Kondao Island in Vietnam.
