= Lankascincus sripadensis =

Sripada Lanka skink

Scientific classification
- Kingdom: Animalia
- Phylum: Chordata
- Class: Reptilia
- Order: Squamata
- Family: Scincidae
- Genus: Lankascincus
- Species: L. sripadensis

Binomial name
- Lankascincus sripadensis Wickramasinghe, Rodrigo, Dayawansa & Jayantha, 2007

Species of lizard

Lankascincus sripadensis, also commonly known as the Sripada forest skink, is a species of lizard in the family Scincidae. The species is endemic to the island of Sri Lanka.
