= Ta Pang Po =

Coordinates: 22.32593°N 114.012121°E

Ta Pang Po (Chinese: 打棚埔) is a village located on the Tsing Chau Tsai Peninsula of Lantau Island, in the Tsuen Wan District of Hong Kong.

== Administration ==
Ta Pang Po is a recognized village under the New Territories Small House Policy.
