= Dibamus ingeri =

Conservation status
- Data Deficient (IUCN 3.1)

Scientific classification
- Kingdom: Animalia
- Phylum: Chordata
- Class: Reptilia
- Order: Squamata
- Suborder: Dibamia
- Family: Dibamidae
- Genus: Dibamus
- Species: D. ingeri

Binomial name
- Dibamus ingeri Das & Lim, 2003

Species of lizard

Dibamus ingeri is a species of legless lizard in the family Dibamidae. The species is endemic to the island of Borneo.

== Etymology ==
The specific name, ingeri, is in honor of American herpetologist Robert F. Inger.

== Geographic range ==
D. ingeri is found in the northeastern portion of the island of Borneo, in Sipitang District, Sabah, East Malaysia.

== Habitat ==
The preferred natural habitat of D. ingeri, is forest, at an altitude of 1,180 m (3,870 ft).

== Description ==
D. ingeri may attain a snout-to-vent length (SVL) of 9.6 cm (3.8 in). The tail is relatively short, about 15% SVL.

== Reproduction ==
D. ingeri is oviparous.
