= Tai Tsing Chau =

Coordinates: 22.340349°N 114.041643°E

Tai Tsing Chau (Chinese: 大青洲) is a village located on the Tsing Chau Tsai Peninsula of Lantau Island, in the Tsuen Wan District of Hong Kong.

== Administration ==
Tai Tsing Chau is a recognized village under the New Territories Small House Policy.
