= Seram blind skink =

Scientific classification
- Kingdom: Animalia
- Phylum: Chordata
- Class: Reptilia
- Order: Squamata
- Suborder: Dibamia
- Family: Dibamidae
- Genus: Dibamus
- Species: D. seramensis

Binomial name
- Dibamus seramensis Greer, 1985

Species of lizard

The Seram blind skink (Dibamus seramensis) is a legless lizard endemic to Seram.
