= Dibamus tebal =

Conservation status
- Data Deficient (IUCN 3.1)

Scientific classification
- Kingdom: Animalia
- Phylum: Chordata
- Class: Reptilia
- Order: Squamata
- Suborder: Dibamia
- Family: Dibamidae
- Genus: Dibamus
- Species: D. tebal

Binomial name
- Dibamus tebal Das & Lim, 2009

Species of lizard

Dibamus tebal is a legless lizard in the family Dibamidae. It is endemic to Pulau Simeuleu in the Mentawai Archipelago, Indonesia. The holotype and the only known specimen is a robust-bodied lizard measuring 134 mm (5.3 in) in snout–vent length.
