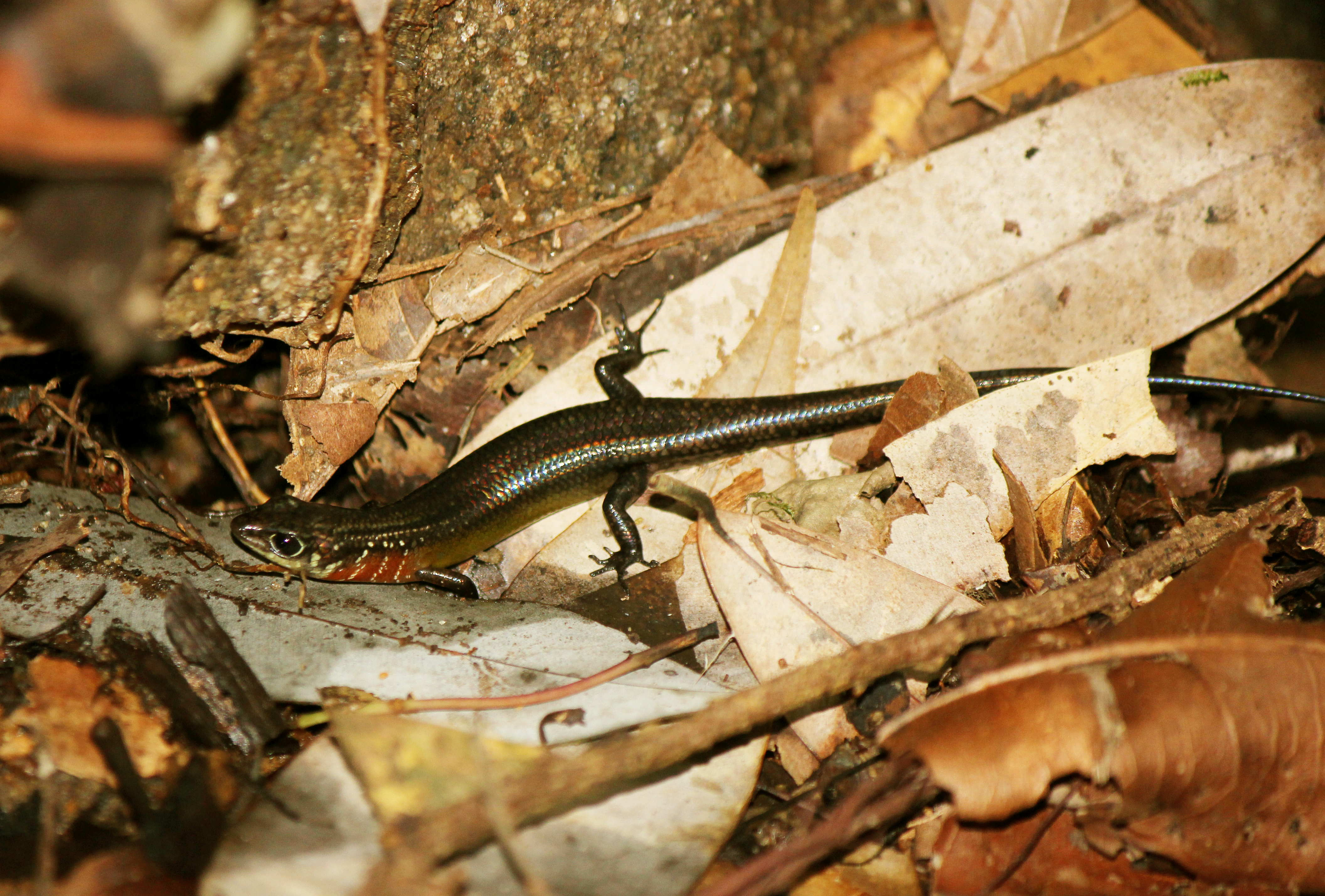

Conservation status
- Least Concern (IUCN 3.1)

Scientific classification
- Kingdom: Animalia
- Phylum: Chordata
- Class: Reptilia
- Order: Squamata
- Family: Scincidae
- Genus: Lankascincus
- Species: L. gansi

Binomial name
- Lankascincus gansi Greer, 1991

= Lankascincus gansi =

Species of lizard

Lankascincus gansi, also commonly known as Gans's lankaskink and Gans's tree skink, is a species of lizard in the family Scincidae. The species is endemic to the island of Sri Lanka.

== Etymology ==
The specific name, gansi, is in honor of German-born American herpetologist Carl Gans (1923–2009).

== Habitat ==
L. gansi is found commonly in home gardens and forests from sea level to 1,000 m (3,300 ft) in the wet climatic zones.

== Geographic range ==
Localities in Sri Lanka from which L. gansi has been recorded include Gampola, Deniyaya, Akuressa, Ratnapura, Sinharaja, Kuruwita, and Pallegama.

== Description ==
L. gansi has 23–28 scale rows at midbody. The lamellae under the fourth toe number 12–16. The dorsum is grayish brown, with brownish-black vertebral and flank stripes. The flanks are spotted with yellowish cream. The iris is yellowish brown in color. The venter is unpatterned grayish yellow. The throat of the male is dark.

== Behavior ==
L. gansi hides under logs, stones, leaf litter, becoming active and coming out for foraging in morning and at dusk.

== Diet ==
L. gansi preys on insects.

== Reproduction ==
A sexually mature female of L. gansi may lay a clutch of one to two eggs in loose soil.
