= Dibamus bogadeki =

Conservation status
- Endangered (IUCN 3.1)

Scientific classification
- Kingdom: Animalia
- Phylum: Chordata
- Class: Reptilia
- Order: Squamata
- Suborder: Dibamia
- Family: Dibamidae
- Genus: Dibamus
- Species: D. bogadeki

Binomial name
- Dibamus bogadeki Darevsky, 1992

Species of lizard

Dibamus bogadeki, or Bogadek's burrowing lizard (Chinese: 鮑氏雙足蜥), is a species of legless lizard in the family Dibamidae. The species is endemic to Hong Kong.

== Etymology ==
D. bogadeki is named after its first collector, Father Anthony Bogadek, a herpetologist and teacher at the St Louis School in Hong Kong, and a coauthor of the first major guide to Hong Kong Amphibians and Reptiles.

== Distribution and ecology ==
The species D. bogadeki can only be found on Hei Ling Chau, Shek Kwu Chau and Sunshine Island in Hong Kong. It was discovered in 1987 on the island of Hei Ling Chau, the species is also the only legless lizard that can be found in Hong Kong. It lives in soil or under stones or rotting wood lying on the forest floor. The first live specimen was discovered hiding under a mass of dead leaves and soil in a drain beside woodland. As a nocturnal and burrowing species it is practically blind, and its eyes are covered by scales.

== Reproduction ==
D. bogadeki is oviparous.
