= Tai Chuen =

Coordinates: 22.344759°N 114.051473°E

Tai Chuen (Chinese: 大轉) is a village located on the Tsing Chau Tsai Peninsula of Lantau Island, in the Tsuen Wan District of Hong Kong.

== Administration ==
Tai Chuen is a recognized village under the New Territories Small House Policy.
