= Smith's blind skink =

Conservation status
- Data Deficient (IUCN 3.1)

Scientific classification
- Kingdom: Animalia
- Phylum: Chordata
- Class: Reptilia
- Order: Squamata
- Suborder: Dibamia
- Family: Dibamidae
- Genus: Dibamus
- Species: D. smithi

Binomial name
- Dibamus smithi Greer, 1985

Species of lizard

Smith's blind skink (Dibamus smithi) is a species of legless lizard in the family Dibamidae. The species is endemic to Vietnam.

== Etymology ==
The specific name, smithi, is in honor of British herpetologist Malcolm Arthur Smith.

== Geographic range ==
Dibamus smithi is endemic to central Vietnam.

== Habitat ==
The preferred natural habitat of Dibamus smithi is forest, at altitudes of 1,212–1,515 m (3,976–4,970 ft).

== Behavior ==
Dibamus smithi is terrestrial and fossorial.

== Reproduction ==
Dibamus smithi is oviparous.
