= Jarujin's forest gecko =

Conservation status
- Least Concern (IUCN 3.1)

Scientific classification
- Kingdom: Animalia
- Phylum: Chordata
- Class: Reptilia
- Order: Squamata
- Suborder: Gekkota
- Family: Gekkonidae
- Genus: Cyrtodactylus
- Species: C. jarujini

Binomial name
- Cyrtodactylus jarujini Ulber, 1993

Species of lizard

Jarujin's forest gecko (Cyrtodactylus jarujini) is a species of lizard in the family Gekkonidae. The species is endemic to Southeast Asia.

== Etymology ==
The specific name, jarujini, is in honor of Thai herpetologist Jarujin Nabhitabhata (1950–2008).

== Geographic range ==
C. jarujini is found in Laos and northern Thailand.

== Habitat ==
The preferred natural habitat of C. jarujini is forest.

== Behavior ==
C. jarujini is strictly nocturnal.

== Reproduction ==
C. jarujini is oviparous.
