= Siamese green-eyed gecko =

Conservation status
- Least Concern (IUCN 3.1)

Scientific classification
- Kingdom: Animalia
- Phylum: Chordata
- Class: Reptilia
- Order: Squamata
- Suborder: Gekkota
- Family: Gekkonidae
- Genus: Gekko
- Species: G. siamensis

Binomial name
- Gekko siamensis W. Grossmann & Ulber, 1990

Synonyms
- Gekko siamensis W. Grossmann & Ulber, 1990; Gekko taylori Ota & Nabhitabhata, 1991; Gekko siamensis — Rösler, 1995; Gekko (Gekko) siamensis — Wood et al., 2019

Species of lizard

The Siamese green-eyed gecko (Gekko siamensis) is a species of lizard in the family Gekkonidae. The species is endemic to Thailand.

== Etymology ==
The specific name siamensis refers to the type locality. The specific name of the now-synonymized Gekko taylori honors Edward Harrison Taylor, an American herpetologist.

== Habitat ==
The preferred natural habitat of G. siamensis is forest.

== Reproduction ==
G. siamensis is oviparous.
