= Dibamus vorisi =

Conservation status
- Data Deficient (IUCN 3.1)

Scientific classification
- Kingdom: Animalia
- Phylum: Chordata
- Class: Reptilia
- Order: Squamata
- Suborder: Dibamia
- Family: Dibamidae
- Genus: Dibamus
- Species: D. vorisi

Binomial name
- Dibamus vorisi Das & Lim, 2003

Species of lizard

Dibamus vorisi is a species of legless lizard in the family Dibamidae. The species is endemic to Borneo.

== Etymology ==
The specific name, vorisi, is in honor of American herpetologist Harold Knight Voris (born 1940) of the Field Museum of Natural History.

== Habitat ==
The preferred natural habitat of D. vorisi is forest.

== Description ==
D. vorisi may attain a snout-to-vent length (SVL) of 9 cm (3.5 in). The tail is short, about 14% SVL in males, and only about 6% SVL in females.

== Reproduction ==
D. vorisi is oviparous.
