= Dibamus dezwaani =

Conservation status
- Data Deficient (IUCN 3.1)

Scientific classification
- Kingdom: Animalia
- Phylum: Chordata
- Class: Reptilia
- Order: Squamata
- Suborder: Dibamia
- Family: Dibamidae
- Genus: Dibamus
- Species: D. dezwaani

Binomial name
- Dibamus dezwaani Das & Lim, 2005

Species of lizard

Dibamus dezwaani is a species of legless lizard in the family Dibamidae. The species is endemic to the island of Nias, off Sumatra (Indonesia).

== Etymology ==
The specific name, dezwaani, is in honor of Dutch anthropologist Johannes Pieter Kleiweg de Zwaan.

== Habitat ==
The preferred natural habitat of D. dezwaani is forest.

== Description ==
Small for its genus, D. dezwaani may attain a snout-to-vent length (SVL) of about 12 cm (4.7 in), and a tail length of about 1.5 cm (0.59 in).

== Reproduction ==
D. dezwaani is oviparous.
