= Pa Tau Kwu =

Area in Hong Kong

Coordinates: 22.321654°N 114.052865°E

Pa Tau Kwu (Chinese: 扒頭鼓) is an area of Tsing Chau Tsai Peninsula, on Lantau Island in Hong Kong and the site of a former village. Administratively, it is part of Tsuen Wan District.

== Administration ==
Pa Tau Kwu is a recognized village under the New Territories Small House Policy.

== Geography ==
Pa Tau Kwu is located in the northeastern part of Lantau Island, northeast of Penny's Bay. The area includes two bays: Pa Tau Kwu Pak Wan (扒頭鼓北灣; 'north bay') and Pa Tau Kwu Nam Wan (扒頭鼓南灣; 'south bay'), separated by a small peninsula.

== Archaeology ==
Pa Tau Kwu has been listed as a Site of Archaeological Interest and archaeological excavations have been conducted in the area. The site is a headland site with coast on three sides that included the possible remains of up to twenty houses.
