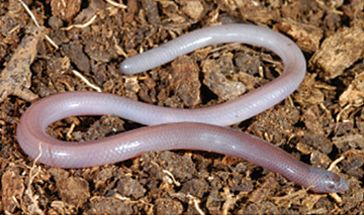

Conservation status
- Least Concern (IUCN 3.1)

Scientific classification
- Kingdom: Animalia
- Phylum: Chordata
- Class: Reptilia
- Order: Squamata
- Suborder: Dibamia
- Family: Dibamidae
- Genus: Anelytropsis; Cope, 1885
- Species: A. papillosus

Binomial name
- Anelytropsis papillosus Cope, 1885

= Mexican blind lizard =

Species of lizard

The Mexican blind lizard (Anelytropsis papillosus) is a species of legless lizard in the family Dibamidae, and the only species in the genus Anelytropsis. It is endemic to Mexico. They look like Amphisbaenia, but are in fact, only distantly related.

== Etymology ==
Although early authors did not discuss the etymology, the generic name, Anelytropsis, is presumed to be based on the Greek words: ana = up opon; elytron = shield; ops = eye, in reference to the eyes which are concealed by ocular scales. The trivial name or specific epithet, papillosus, is Latin and refers to the minute papillae present on the scales in the anterior areas of the mouth and nose (rostral scale, first labial scale, and loreal).

== Description ==
The Mexican blind lizard is a limbless lizard, adapted for burrowing. The head is discernible from the cylindrical body by only a slightly greater width. There are no ear openings and each eye is entirely concealed under a single ocular plate. There are three large plates on the top of the head. The scales on the body are "scincoid", smooth with rounded edges, and may occur in even or odd numbered rows. It is a small species, ranging 20 - 50 cm. in total length. The tail is about one fourth of the total length of the lizard. Anelytropsis are brownish to flesh-colored, with some individuals exhibiting patches of pale scales producing a faint piebald appearance.

== Distribution ==
Anelytropsis papillosus is endemic to Mexico. It is known from northeastern regions of the country at elevations from 300 to 2300 meters, including southern Tamaulipas, eastern San Luis Potosí, northern Hidalgo and Querétaro, northern and central Veracruz, and extreme northern Oaxaca. Considering the fact that several confirmed localities are extremely close to state boundaries, its rarity, and its fossorial and secretive behavior, some authors have speculated it should be anticipated in areas west of the confirmed distribution, specifically southern Nuevo Leon, extreme eastern Guanajuato, and eastern Puebla.

== Ecology and natural history ==
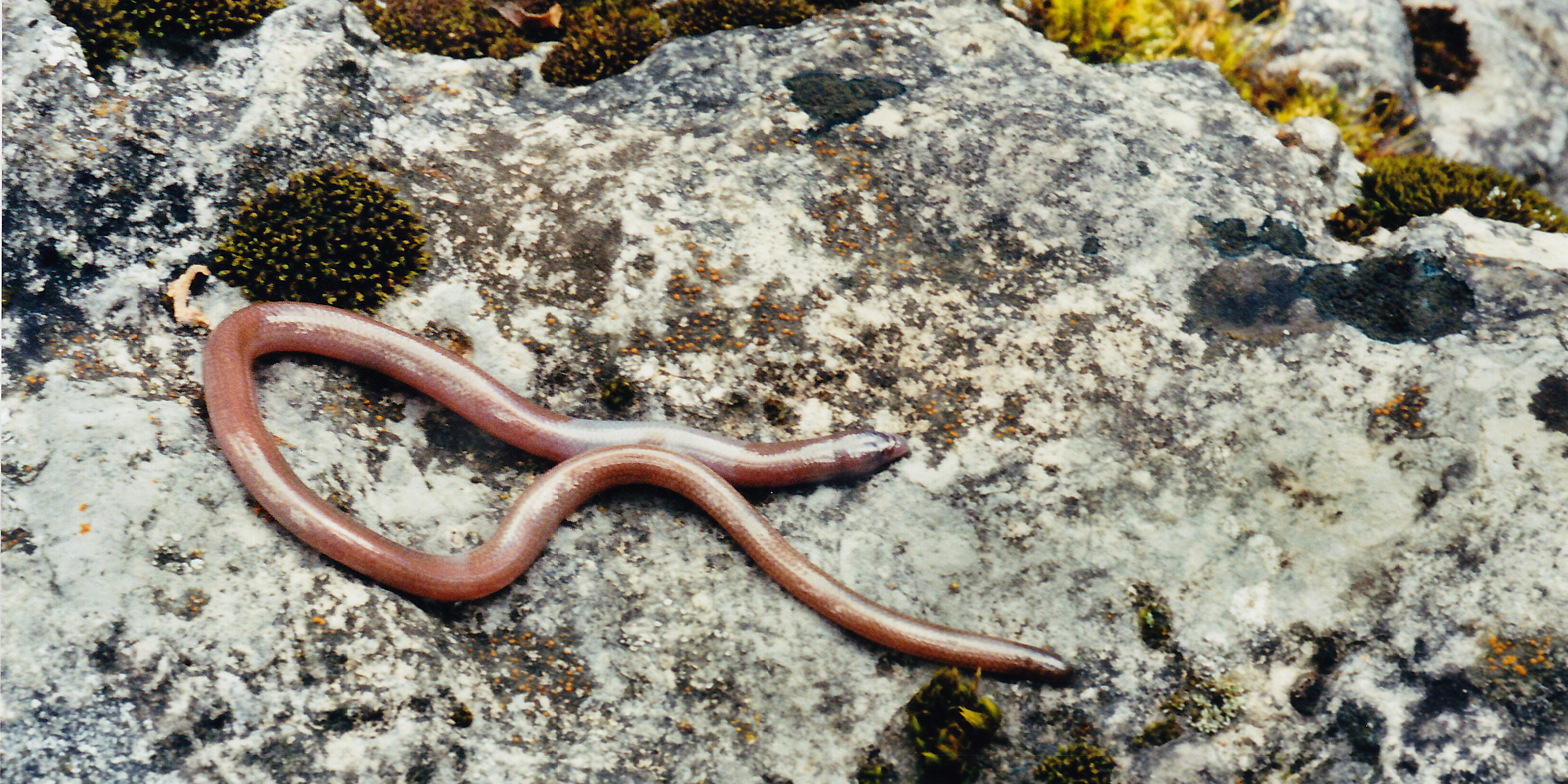
Anelytropsis papillosus, municipality of Tula, Tamaulipas (15 Aug 2004).

Very little information has been published on the ecology and natural history of this rare and enigmatic species. Hobart M. Smith reported finding two specimens in rotten logs near ant nests and noted they were "apparently" feeding on termites or ants in the logs.

Collector's accounts of finding two specimens in San Luis Potosí, on separate occasions, stated that both lizards intensely bit the collectors fingers continuously for about three or four minutes when first handled. Then each lizard engaged in thanatosis (death feigning behavior), at which time the lizards were relaxed but slightly rigid with their mouths half open, one for about two or three minutes, the other for a briefer length of time but subsequently, it suddenly lashed its body and autotomized about half of its tail.

=== Habitat ===
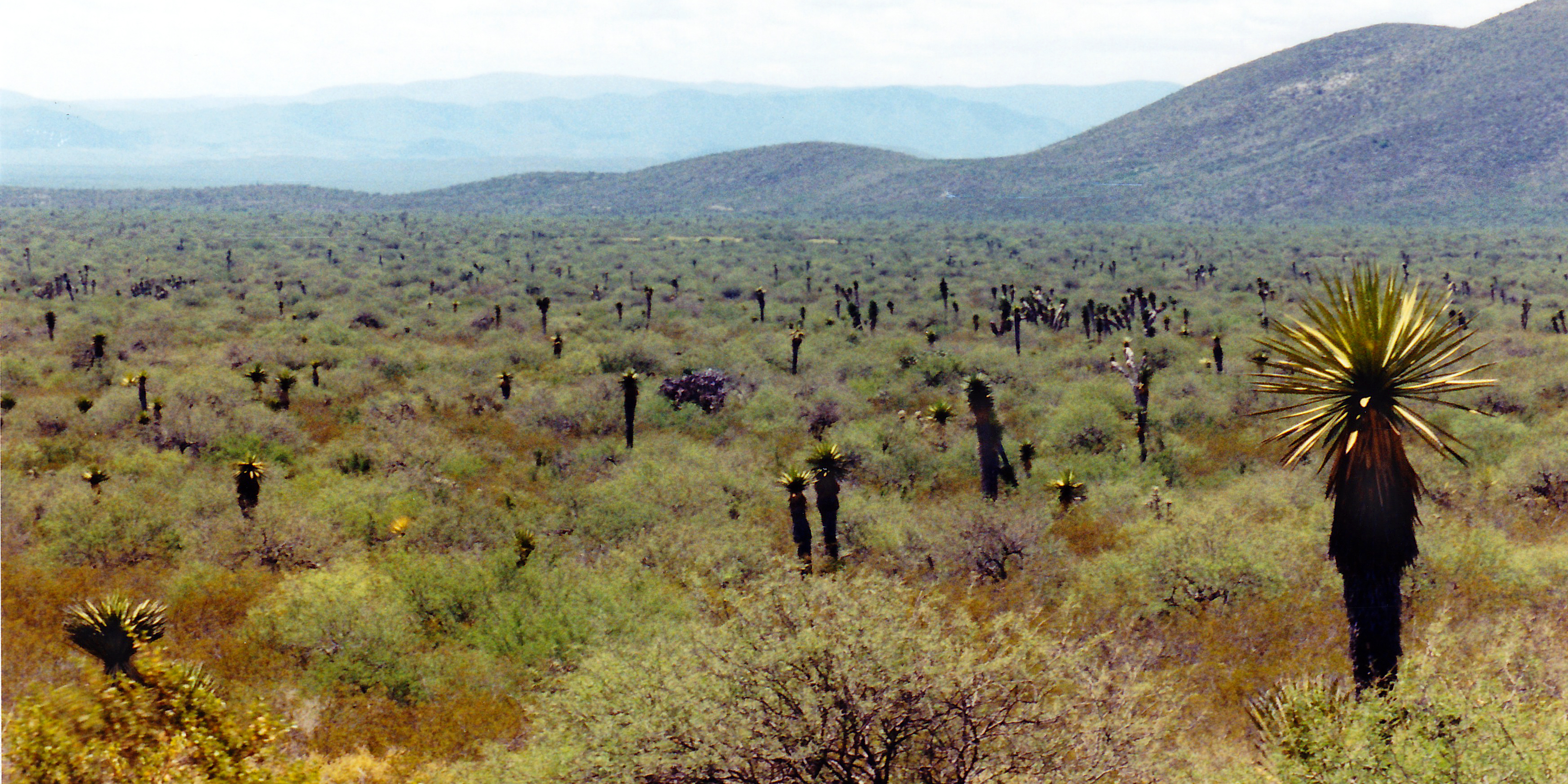
Chihuahua Desert scrub flats, Municipality of Tula, Tamaulipas (24 Sept 2003)

Locality records for the fossorial Anelytropsis papillosus do not correlate to surface vegetation communities or typical biogeographic patterns. It has been reported from a remarkably wide spectrum of habitats, from Chihuahuan Desert scrub flats on the Mexican Plateau, to cloud forest in the Sierra Madre Oriental (El Cielo Biosphere Reserve), and tropical deciduous forest on the coastal plain in Tamaulipas. Pine -oak forest, tropical thorn forest, and semiarid deciduous vegetation have also been identified as collecting sites. It has been found under boulders, rocks, and stones, under fallen logs, burrowing in rotten logs, and under dead yucca trees. The distribution of the species falls mostly within the Mexican ecoregions of the tropical Veracruz moist forests, the Sierra Madre Oriental pine–oak forests, and southwestern portions of the Meseta Central matorral.

== Conservation status ==
The Mexican Federal Government list Anelytropsis papillosus as a threatened species and it is protected by Mexican law. In a conservation evaluation using Environmental Vulnerability Scores (EVS) [low, 3–9; medium, 10–13; high, 14–20], Anelytropsis papillosus was rated 10, a species of medium vulnerability. Conversely, the IUCN Red List of Threatened Species ranked Anelytropsis papillosus as a species of least concern.
