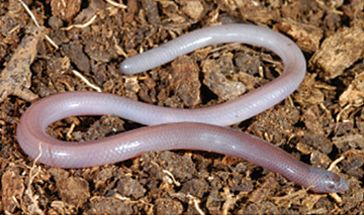
- Mexican blind lizard (Anelytropsis papillosus)

Scientific classification
- Kingdom: Animalia
- Phylum: Chordata
- Class: Reptilia
- Order: Squamata
- Suborder: Dibamia; Gasc, 1968
- Family: Dibamidae; Boulenger, 1884

Genera
- Anelytropsis; Dibamus; †Hoeckosaurus

Synonyms
- Anelytropidae Cope, 1885

= Dibamidae =

Dibamids Temporal range: Oligocene–Recent

Family of lizards

Dibamidae or blind skinks is a family of lizards characterized by their elongated cylindrical body and an apparent lack of limbs. Female dibamids are entirely limbless and the males retain small flap-like hind limbs, which they use to grip their partner during mating. They have a rigidly fused skull, lack pterygoid teeth and external ears. Their eyes are greatly reduced, and covered with a scale.

They are small insectivorous lizards, with long, slender bodies, adapted for burrowing into the soil. They usually lay one egg with a hard, calcified shell, rather than the leathery shells typical of many other reptile groups.

The family Dibamidae has two genera, Dibamus with 23 species native to Southeast Asia, Indonesia, the Philippines, and western New Guinea and the monotypic Anelytropsis native to Mexico. 21st-century phylogenetic analyses place the dibamids as the sister clade to all the other lizards and snakes or classify them as sharing a common ancestor with the infraorder Gekkota, with Dibamidae and Gekkota forming the sister clade to all other squamates. Hoeckosaurus from the Oligocene of Mongolia represents the only fossil record of the group.

== Characteristics ==
=== General appearance ===
Dibamids are burrower lizards characterized by their elongated bodies with blunt head and tail, and an apparent lack of limbs. Relatively small, blind skinks can reach a maximum length of 250 mm (9.8 in) from head to tail and the snout vent length (SVL) is variable between both genus Anelytropsis and Dibamus. In Anelytropsis, the tail is longer than in Dibamus and represents between 34 and the 38% of the snout vent length which can range from 77 to 180 mm (3 to 7 in). In Dibamus, the tail corresponds to 9 to 25% of the SVL that varies from 52 to 203 mm (2 to 8 in).

Usually dibamids are dark colored, from brown to dark purple, with little to no variation along their body and frequently lack elaborate patterns. It is common to find a color gradation from the darker back towards a lighter ventral side. Scales are shiny and smooth and very similar and overlapping along with some variation in number and shape in the head and anal regions where males usually have additional scales to cover anal pores. Scale row counts varies between both genera; Anelytropsis has 19 to 25 rows whereas Dibamus has 18 to 33. In both groups osteoderms are absent.

General characteristics of the soft tissue includes a tongue that is covered in lamellae except in the tip, heavily modified ears without external openings or middle ear cavity or eustachian tubes, and highly reduced eyes that are covered by a scale and lack internal structure, particularly in Dibamus.

=== Limbs ===
Dibamids are lizards with highly reduced limbs but they are not completely limbless. Males and females have rudimentary poorly developed hind limbs containing a femur, tibia and fibula in males, and distal cartilage cap. These elements are more developed on Dibamus than in Anelytropsis. Female Dibamus lack the tibia and the fibula.

=== Skull ===
The skull is approximately 5 – 7 mm in length with reduced kinesis and a more rigid skull for burrowing. The combination of fossorial habits and small size, contributes to the development of a skull configuration that is frequently found in other groups of burrowers and miniaturized species. Among those characteristics are the closure of the supratemporal fenestra and the post-temporal fenestra, the relative large braincase, tubular or scroll-like palatines and modified jaw suspension mechanism with the quadrate articulating with the lateral wall of the braincase.

Other characteristics of the skull of blind skinks include the absence of a parietal foramen, a well developed secondary palate formed by three different bones, the maxillae, vomers and palatines which are expanded ventromedially to form a scroll, and the lack of palatal teeth. Nasal and frontal bones are paired and contact each other in a W-shape suture with no overlap between the two bones, and several bones are lost (lacrimal, postorbital and jugal) or highly reduced (supratemporal and squamosal). The main cranial differences, besides sizes, between Anelytropsis and Dibamus is the presence of epipterygoid and postfrontal in the Central American genus.

The mandible of Dibamidae bears less than 10 teeth and is composed of only three bones, the dentary, the coronoid and the compound bone. A remnant of the splenial bone is only present in one species of Dibamus, Dibamus novaeguineae.

== Classification ==
The family Dibamidae contains two genera, Anelytropsis and Dibamus, and the close relationship of the genera was based on two morphological characteristics that are unique to these groups, the secondary palate and the lamellae covering the tongue, and additional cranial characteristics that can be shared with other groups of lizards.

The anatomical characteristics that dibamids share with other squamates contributed to the formulation of different taxonomic hypothesis. Dibamids, and particularly Dibamus was considered to be part of geckos and precisely the family of legless geckos; snakes, considering the organization of the skull and jaw muscles; or was proposed to be closely related to a group of fossorial skinks with elongated bodies and reduced limbs.

== Phylogeny ==
=== Relationships among Dibamidae ===
- - - Anelytropsis papillosus
    - - - Dibamus greeri
        - Dibamus montanus
      - - Dibamus bourreti
        - Dibamus bourreti
  - - Dibamus tiomanensis
    - - Dibamus novaeguineae
      - - Dibamus seramensis
        - Dibamus celebensis

Phylogeny of Dibamidae

By 2011, the relationships within Dibamidae were only assessed in a phylogenetic analysis that included DNA sequences from seven nuclear genes and one mitochondrial gene for 8 species, seven species of Dibamus and the one species of Anelytropsis. This analysis shows that there are two major clades within Dibamidae, one that includes the one species form the genus Anelytropsis, Analytropsis papillous, and the species of Dibamus that are distributed along continental Southeast Asia (Dibamus greeri, Dibamus montanus, and Dibamus bourreti). The other clade includes species that are currently distributed in the peninsular Southeast Asia and Islands (Dibamus tiomanensis, Dibamus novaeguineae, Dibamus seramensis, and Dibamus celebensis). These clades diverged 72 million years ago. Anelytropsis diverged from all mainland Dibamus at approximately 69.2 million years ago.

=== Dibamidae and its relationship with Squamata ===
The relationship of Dibamidae with other Squamata (lizards and snakes) has a long history of phylogenetic studies in which the morphological characteristics are used to determine those relationships. Those analyses found close relationships between Dibamidae and all other lizards with elongated bodies, limb reduction and usually, a fossorial habit like amphisbaenians, snakes or fossorial skinks. In morphology based phylogenies, dibamids are sister taxa to amphisbaenians and the clade that includes amphisbaenians and Dibamidae is sister to all snakes. The close relationships of this groups are the result of convergent evolution among these groups since some of the morphological traits have evolved independently in different groups.

Newer phylogenies from the 2010s, using DNA sequences of nuclear and mitochondrial genes, include a large taxonomic sample of squamates and place dibamids as the sister group to all other lizards and snakes, or with Gekkota as the sister group to all other squamates. Phylogenetic evidence supports dibamids being the most basal squamates, being sister to all other lizards and snakes, and indicates that they diverged during the late Triassic, around 210 million years ago.

== Biodiversity ==
There are two recognized genera within the family, Anelytropsis and Dibamus. According to The Reptile Database, Anelytropsis is monotypic and Dibamus includes 23 species:

Anelytropsis

- Anelytropsis papillosus

Dibamus

- Dibamus alfredi
- Dibamus bogadeki
- Dibamus booliati
- Dibamus bourreti
- Dibamus celebensis
- Dibamus dalaiensis
- Dibamus deharvengi
- Dibamus dezwaani
- Dibamus floweri
- Dibamus greeri
- Dibamus ingeri
- Dibamus kondaoensis
- Dibamus leucurus
- Dibamus montanus
- Dibamus nicobaricum
- Dibamus novaeguineae
- Dibamus seramensis
- Dibamus smithi
- Dibamus somsaki
- Dibamus taylori
- Dibamus tebal
- Dibamus tiomanensis
- Dibamus vorisi

In 2019, an extinct monotypic genus, Hoeckosaurus, was proposed from the description of fossil material from the early Oligocene of the Valley of Lakes in Central Mongolia.

- Hoeckosaurus mongoliensis sp. nov.

== Biogeography ==
Dibamids have a disjunct distribution with one genus living in Northern Mexico, Anelytropsis, and the other one, Dibamus, living in South East Asia. Biogeographical studies suggest that the separation between Anelytropsis and Dibamus, specifically the clade with species that are distributed in continental South East Asia, occurred approximately 69 million years ago during the late Cretaceous and the migration from Asia to North America took place during the Late Paleocene or Eocene through Beringia.

== Biology ==
Blind skinks are insectivorous and feed on arthropods and earthworms. Blind skinks are characterized by their fossorial or burrowing habits. They can dig their own burrows, use old burrows or other openings in the ground, or dwell under the leaf litter or logs.

Species of the genus Dibamus are frequently found in primary and secondary forests in a wide range of altitudinal variation (from the sea level to approximately 1300 meters above sea level). Anelytropsis is found in drier environments and is adapted to xeric conditions of different environments in northern Mexico.

Little is known about the reproduction of this group of lizards, but the inspection of female specimens from herpetological collections indicate that dibamids lays single egg with hardened shell, and eggs are laid frequently, at least in Dibamus.

== Conservation ==
None of the species of Dibamidae are listed as endangered species in the Convention on International Trade in Endangered Species of Wild Fauna and Flora CITES.

The International Union for Conservation of Nature (IUCN) include some of the species of the genus Dibamus and the single species of Anelytropsis in the red list of endangered species, most are in the category of least concern, and two species, Dibamus kondaoensis and Dibamus tiomanensis are listed as nearly threatened and endangered respectively.
