= Edward Harrison Taylor =

American herpetologist

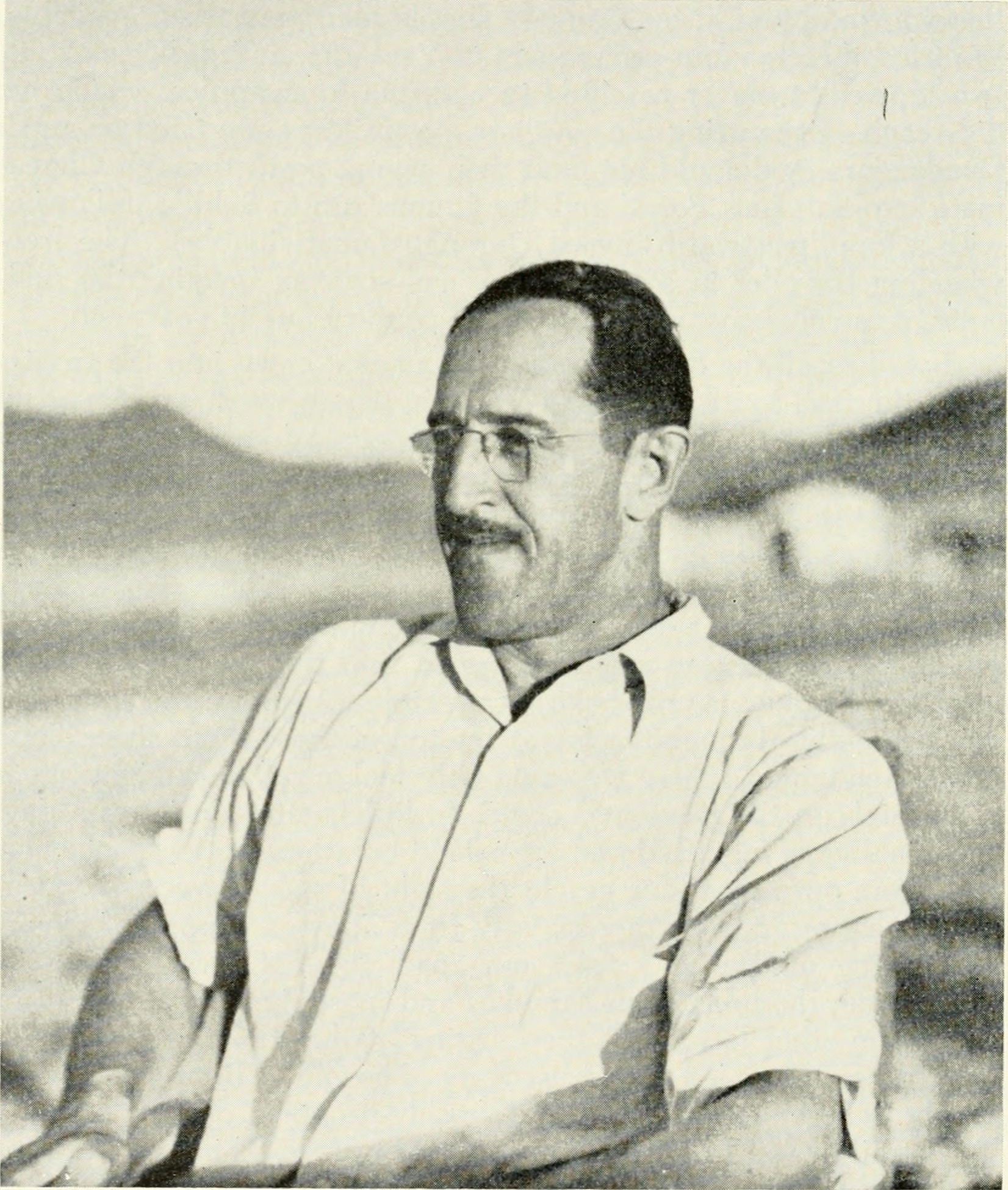
- Born: April 23, 1889; Maysville, Missouri
- Died: June 16, 1978 (aged 89)
- Citizenship: American
- Education: University of Kansas
- Scientific career
- Fields: Biology, herpetology
- Workplaces: University of Kansas
- Author abbrev. (zoology): E. H. Taylor

Edward Harrison Taylor (April 23, 1889 – June 16, 1978) was an American herpetologist from Missouri.

== Early life ==
Taylor was born in Maysville, Missouri, to George and Loretta Taylor. He had an older brother, Eugene.

Taylor studied at the University of Kansas in Lawrence, Kansas, graduating with a B.A. in 1912. Field trips during his time at the University of Kansas with Dr. Clarence McClung and Dr. Roy Moody helped prepare Taylor for his future endeavors. Between 1916 and 1920 he returned briefly to Kansas to finish his M.A.

== Career ==
Upon completing his bachelor's degree, Taylor went to the Philippines, where at first he held a teacher's post in a village in central Mindanao, in the Industrial School for Manobo now known as the Agusan del Sur State College of Agriculture and Technology (ASSCAT). He collected and studied the local herpetofauna extensively and published many papers. He returned to the Philippines after completing his master's degree and was appointed Chief of Fisheries in Manila. On his many survey trips he continued collecting and studying fishes and reptiles of the islands.

In 1927, back in the United States, he became the head of the zoology department of the University of Kansas at Lawrence. From 1929 to 1936, he studied the taxonomy of the genus Eumeces (some common skinks). Subsequently, he focused on Mexican herpetofauna, which he explored on many field trips from 1937 to 1948. In the following years, his explorations took him to Costa Rica, Sri Lanka and Thailand, and he published extensively on all these countries. In 1965, he turned his attention onto Caecilians after having discovered a new species on an island in the Sea of Celebes.

Along with his scientific career, Taylor was attached to intelligence operations. After World War I, he was sent to Siberia to follow the Russian Revolution under the cover of a Red Cross mission to stop a typhus epidemic. During World War II, the OSS employed Taylor to teach jungle survival in British Ceylon.

== Research ==
Taylor described about 150 species and subspecies of reptile that are still recognized today, which makes him one of the most prolific reptile taxonomists of all time. Most of them are from the Philippines, but many others are from Mexico and other parts of the world.

=== Eponymous taxa ===
Nine reptile species named in Taylor's honor are still recognized as valid: Trachemys taylori (Cuatrociénegas slider), Anolis taylori (Taylor's anole), Cyrtodactylus edwardtaylori (Badulla bow-fingered gecko), Dibamus taylori (Lesser Sunda blind lizard), Lankascincus taylori (Taylor's tree skink), Sceloporus edwardtaylori (Taylor's spiny lizard), Sphenomorphus taylori (Taylor's wedge skink), Agkistrodon taylori (ornate cantil), and Pseudorabdion taylori (Taylor's reedsnake). Gekko taylori (Taylor's gecko) has been synonymized with Gekko siamensis (Siamese green-eyed gecko).

Eleven subspecies of reptile named in Taylor's honor are still recognized as valid: Brachymeles boulengeri taylori (Negros short-legged skink), Gerrhonotus liocephalus taylori (Taylor's alligator lizard), Lipinia pulchella taylori (Negros beautiful lipinia), Sceloporus occidentalis taylori (Sierra fence lizard), Sphenomorphus assatus taylori (Taylor's forest skink), Uta stansburiana taylori (Taylor's side-blotched lizard); Snakes: Coniophanes picevittis taylori (Taylor's black-striped snake), Cyclocorus nuchalis taylori (Taylor's southern triangle-spotted snake), Lampropeltis triangulum taylori (Utah milksnake), and Micrurus browni taylori (Acapulco coralsnake).

Eight species of amphibian named in Taylor's honor are still recognized as valid: Hyalinobatrachium taylori (Taylor's glass frog), Platymantis taylori (Taylor's direct-breeding frog), Craugastor taylori (Taylor's robber frog), Lithobates taylori (Peralta frog), Ambystoma taylori (Taylor's salamander), Bolitoglossa taylori (Cerro Cituro salamander), Oedipina taylori (Taylor's worm salamander), and Microcaecilia taylori (Taylor's caecilian).

== Publications ==
Taylor's autobiographical memoir Edward H. Taylor: Recollection of an Herpetologist was published by the University of Kansas Museum of Natural History in 1975, with contributions from A. Byron Leonard, Hobart M. Smith, and George R. Pisani.

== See also ==
- Category:Taxa named by Edward Harrison Taylor
