= Penal system of Hong Kong =

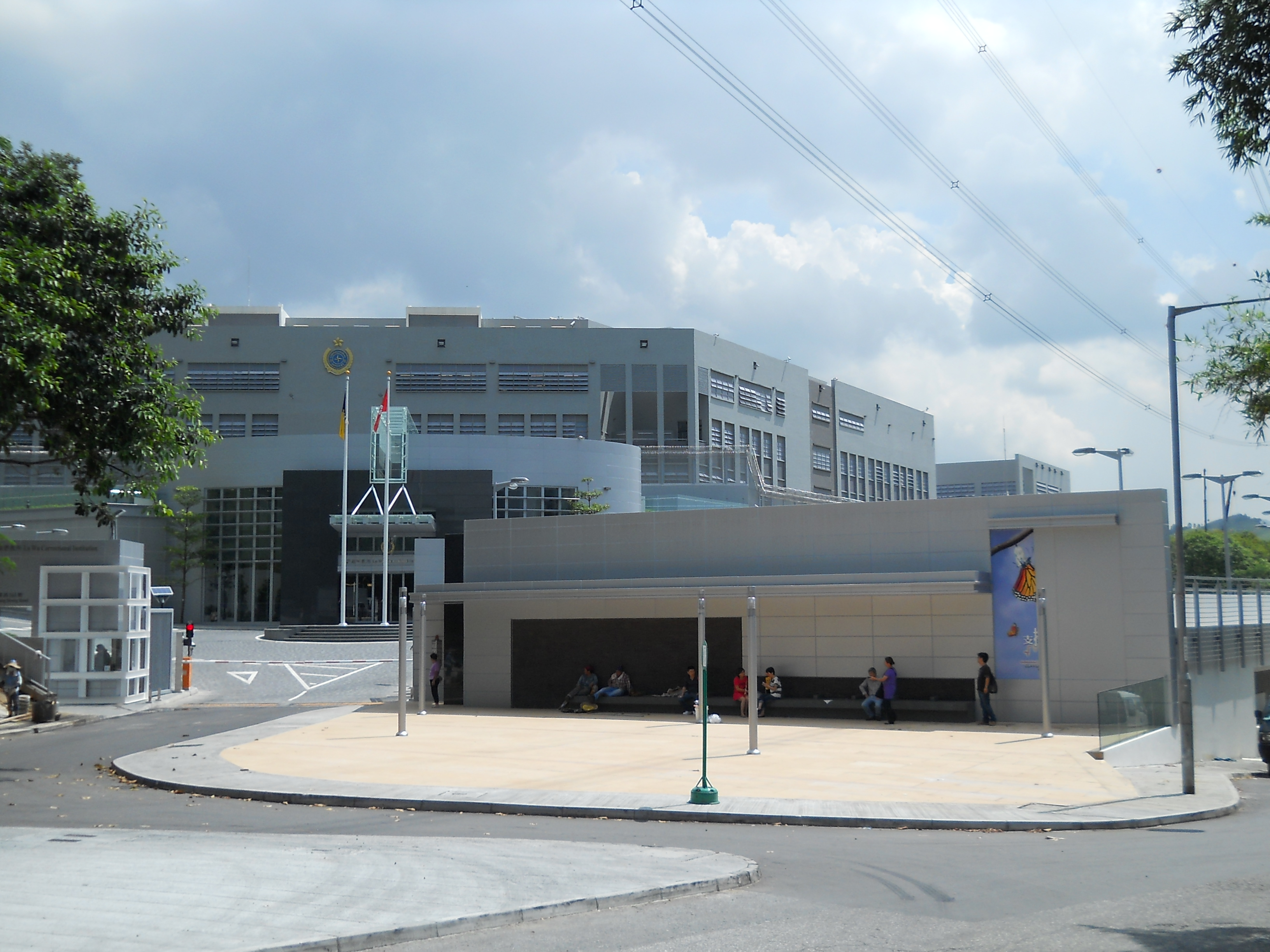
The Lo Wu Correctional Institution

The penal system of Hong Kong, with its colonial tradition, is responsible for carrying out criminal penalties and the supervision and rehabilitation of former prisoners.

Hong Kong's prisons meet basic international criteria and attract less criticism than those in mainland China. After Hong Kong's transition to Chinese control in 1997, its prison system retained the basic lines of the British system. The system's personnel is distinguished by its professionalism and the vast majority holds to high ethical and moral standards. The prisons do not have the crowding and insanitary conditions usual in Asia (in 2013 the average occupancy level was 80% of capacity, down from 96% in 2008), and the overall number of inmates is steadily falling (in 1997 - 12,300, 2013 - 9,200).

In 2014 Hong Kong's prisons had 8,906 inmates. 18.6% were in preliminary detention. Women made up 19.7%, adolescents of both sexes 3.4%, foreigners 26.4%. Of each 100,000 of Hong Kong's population, 123 were prisoners (by comparison: mainland China 172, Ukraine 213, Russia 470, USA 707).

== History ==
=== Until 1950 ===
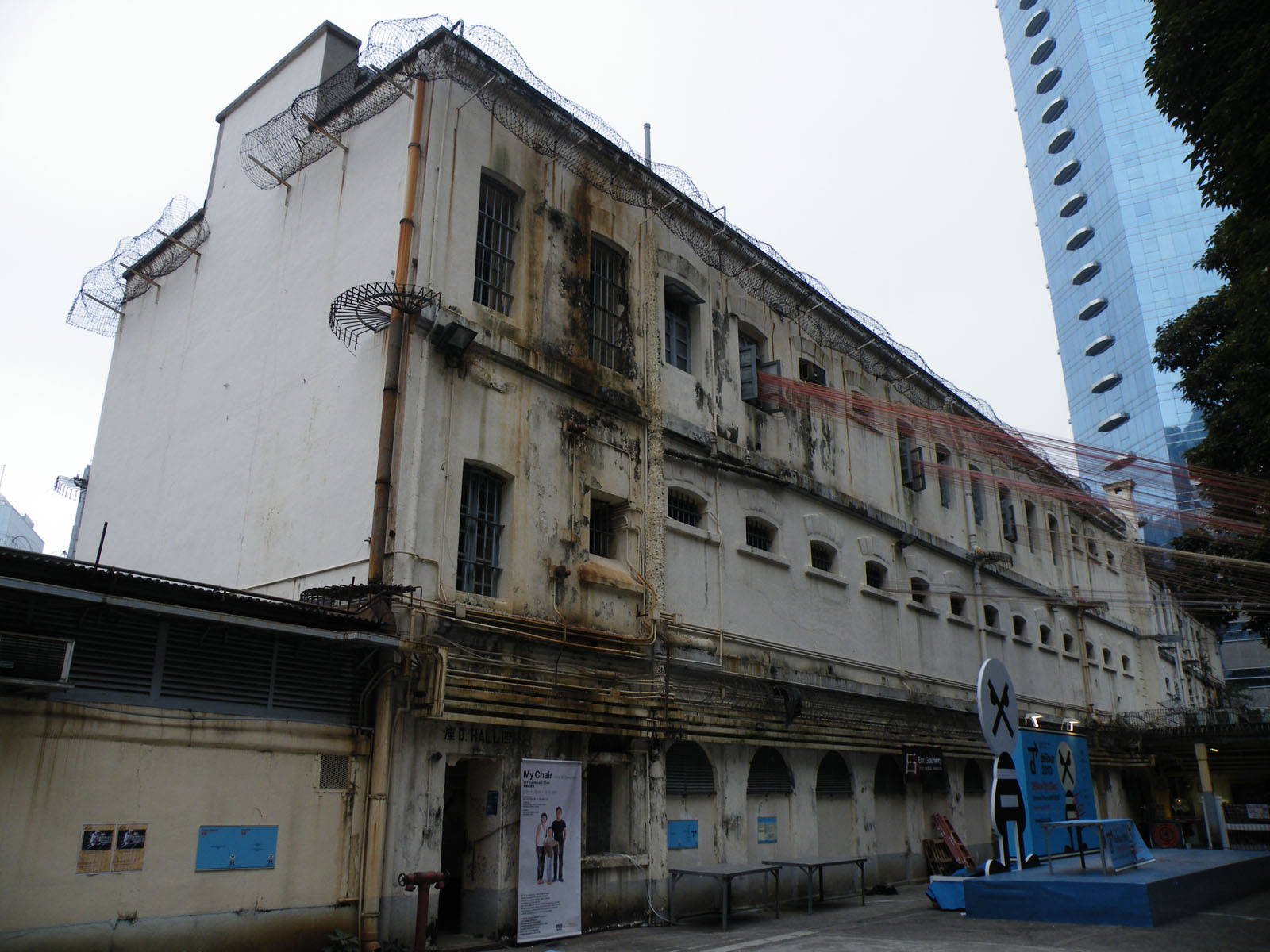
Victoria Jail

In April 1841, with the start of British rule in Hong Kong, Captain William Cane was appointed chief justice and given control of the police and prisons of the new colony. The first prison, named Victoria Prison, opened on the island in August 1841. September 1853 saw the first legislation about prisons in Hong Kong. Limitations on food were introduced as a form of punishment for prisoners in 1876 (Europeans got bread and water; Chinese got rice and water). Public executions were banned after the last took place in April 1894. The British transported some Chinese prisoners to do hard labour in Australia.

In December 1920 Hong Kong's places of detention were transferred to the responsibility of the newly created department of prisons. In April 1932 a new women's prison was opened in the Lai Chi area. In January 1937 work began on a prison in Stanley, at that time one of the best prisons in the British Empire, with six blocks, enough for 1,500 inmates. In 1938 the department began early release on parole for a trial period. In December 1946 a correctional institute was opened for boys aged between 8 and 16. In April 1948 matters of parole were transferred to a social security office, created by the Secretary for Chinese affairs (in 1958 it was renamed the Department for Social Security).

=== 1950s ===
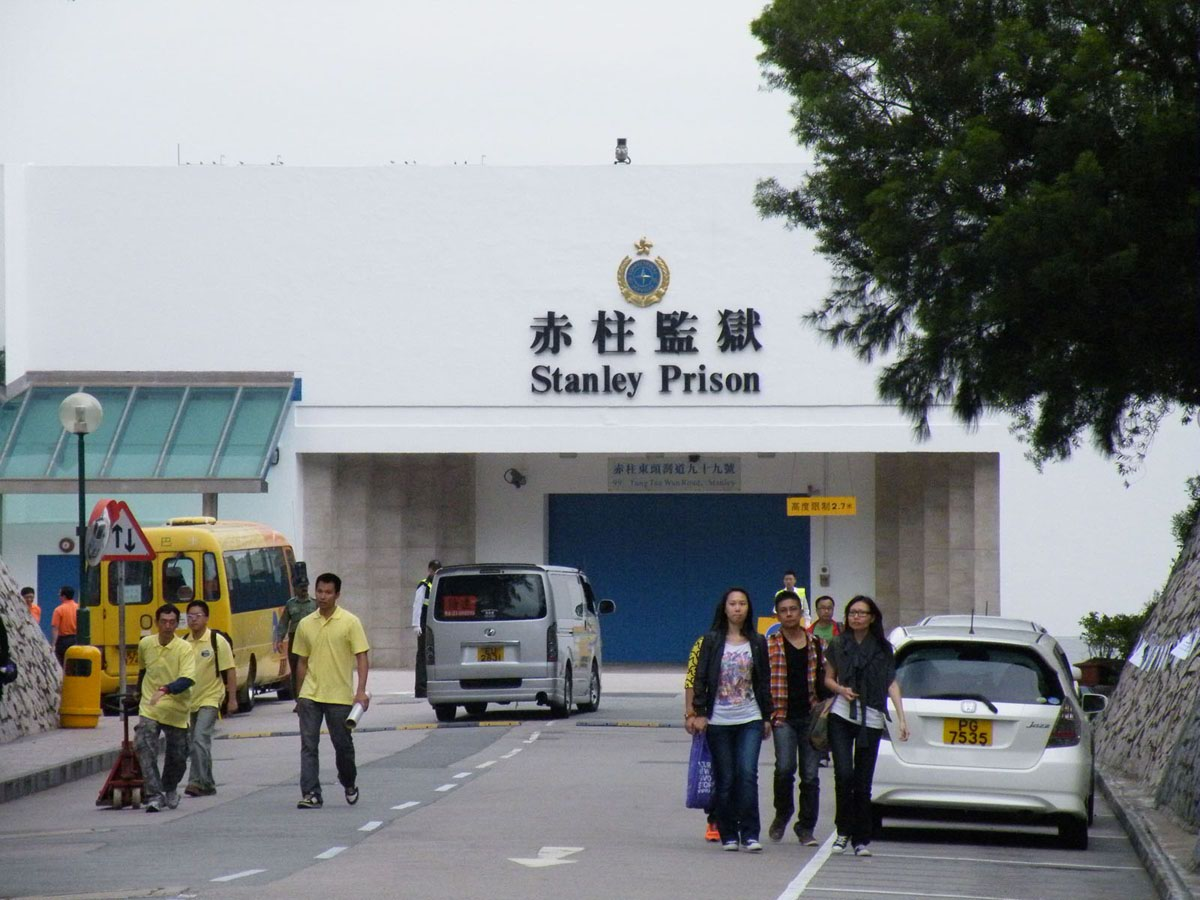
Stanley Prison

In March 1953, work began on the Stanley educational centre for young offenders. In May 1953, Hong Kong prisons started to operate a savings scheme, replacing the hand-outs previously paid to prisoners on their release. This system encouraged inmates to work. As an incentive to inmates in the Stanley and Lai Chi prisons, visits by relatives were introduced in 1955. (Previously prisoners had gone to a cage at the main gate and shouted to visitors through two mesh fences, between which guards patrolled.).

A prison opened at Chi Ma Wan on Lantau Island in 1956. In 1958 the first training school was opened for those working in the prison system. In the same year they introduced a voluntary supervision system for drug-users released from the Tai Lam prison.

=== 1960s ===
In 1960-61 prison officers stopped carrying firearms on duty.

In November 1966 after its last use, Hong Kong introduced a moratorium on the death penalty (From 1946 to 1966, 122 criminals sentenced to the maximum punishment were hanged in the prison at Stanley).

In August 1968 New Life House opened as the first communal dwelling for rehabilitation of formerly-imprisoned drug users. The relevant decision was signed to start a drug dependency treatment programme and open a treatment centre at Tai Lam in January 1969. A numbering system for the admission of criminal lawyers was introduced in January 1971. In March 1972 the imprisonment centre was opened at Sha Tsui, and in November, the Sui Lam psychiatric centre.

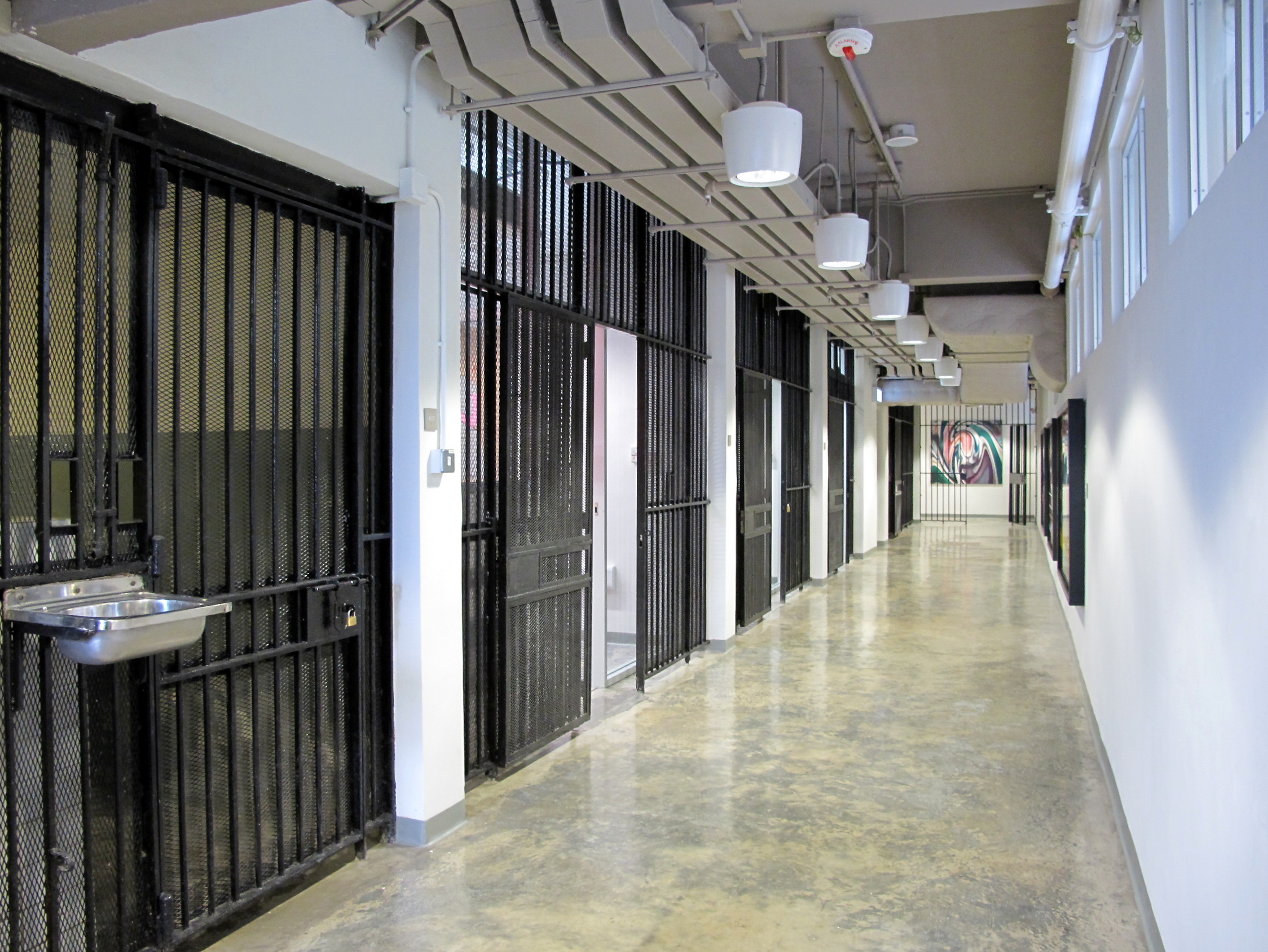
Investigative Prison, North Kowloon

=== 1970s ===
In 1974, physical punishment by caning was introduced for prisoners exhibiting disciplinary problems. In January 1975, a welfare programme for prisoners.In July 1976 the prison administration began to offer prisoners psychological help. After the conclusion of the Vietnam War a flood of Vietnamese refugees streamed into Hong Kong, for which the authorities had to open several camps. In January 1978 the prison department took over the refugee camp at Kai Tak. A department for investigating prisoner complaints opened in March 1979.

=== 1980s ===
In February 1980 the prison department organised the first Asia-Pacific conference for prison administrators. A correctional institute for female young offenders opened in May 1980. In 1981 corporal and dietary punishments were removed from the prison rules.

In February 1982 the Hong Kong Prison Department became the Correctional Services Department, in an attempt to emphasise its role in the rehabilitation of offenders.

In July 1983 Phoenix House opened, a communal halfway house to help put young offenders on the right path.

In August 1984 Bauhinia House opened, communal halfway house for the rehabilitation of women.

In March 1985 the first meeting of prison administrators from the Commonwealth of Nations took place in Hong Kong.

In 1986 the Pik Uk correctional institute for young prisoners administered school exams under supervision by government experts.

In February 1988 Hong Kong joined the agreement on the relocation of sentences developed in Strasbourg in 1983.

In July 1988 the first early-release schemes (the Supervision Scheme and the Pre-release Employment Scheme) came into force.

In December 1989 repatriation from Hong Kong started of the first parties of Vietnamese refugees. In November 1990 corporal punishment on Hong Kong prisons was finally forbidden.

=== 1990-97 ===
In February 1995 Pelican House opened - a communal halfway house for the rehabilitation of adult men.

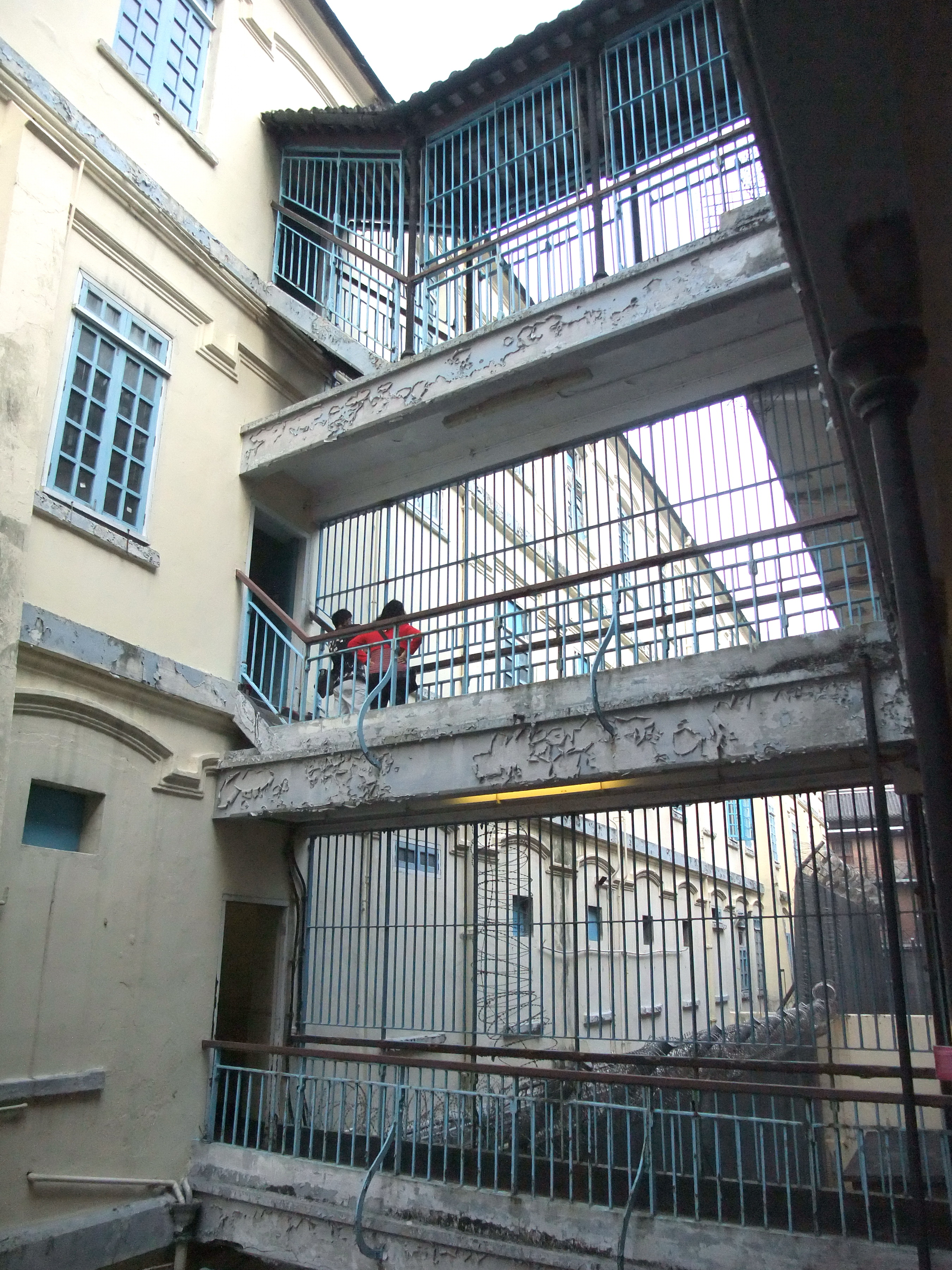
Walkway between Victoria Prison and central police station

In October 1995, the program of halfway houses (communal residences) for those on the path of correction was expanded to include young offenders convicted of drug trafficking.

In November 1996, the Post-Release Supervision of Prisoners Scheme was introduced.

In January 1997, a resolution on the review of long prison sentences was issued, according to which all ambiguous sentences and long sentences for many categories of prisoners were verified.

In May 1997, amendments were passed that significantly relaxed restrictions on prisoners' correspondence.

=== 1997-2000 ===
In July 1997, the new coat of arms of the Department of Correctional Services was approved.

In January 1998, a new unit dedicated to the rehabilitation of former prisoners was established.

In March 1998, an amendment to the Criminal Code came into force, by which prisoners who had committed murder as teenagers and been sentenced to life imprisonment could expect to have their sentences commuted by a special decision of the Supreme Court.

In September 1998, a unit for the evaluation and treatment of sex offenders was opened at the Siu Lam Psychiatric Center.

In April 1999, the Department of Correctional Services added a position in charge of environmental programs.

In June 1999, the Department of Correctional Services opened a new dog training facility on Hei Ling Chau Island.

In October 1999, the new Pak Sha Wan Correctional Facility opened. In the same month, a large-scale campaign was launched to encourage society to give rehabilitated criminals a second chance in life.

In November 1999, the Committee for Public Support of Rehabilitated Criminals was established.

In December 1999, the Hong Kong Correctional Services Industry received an ISO 9002 quality certificate.

=== Since 2000 ===
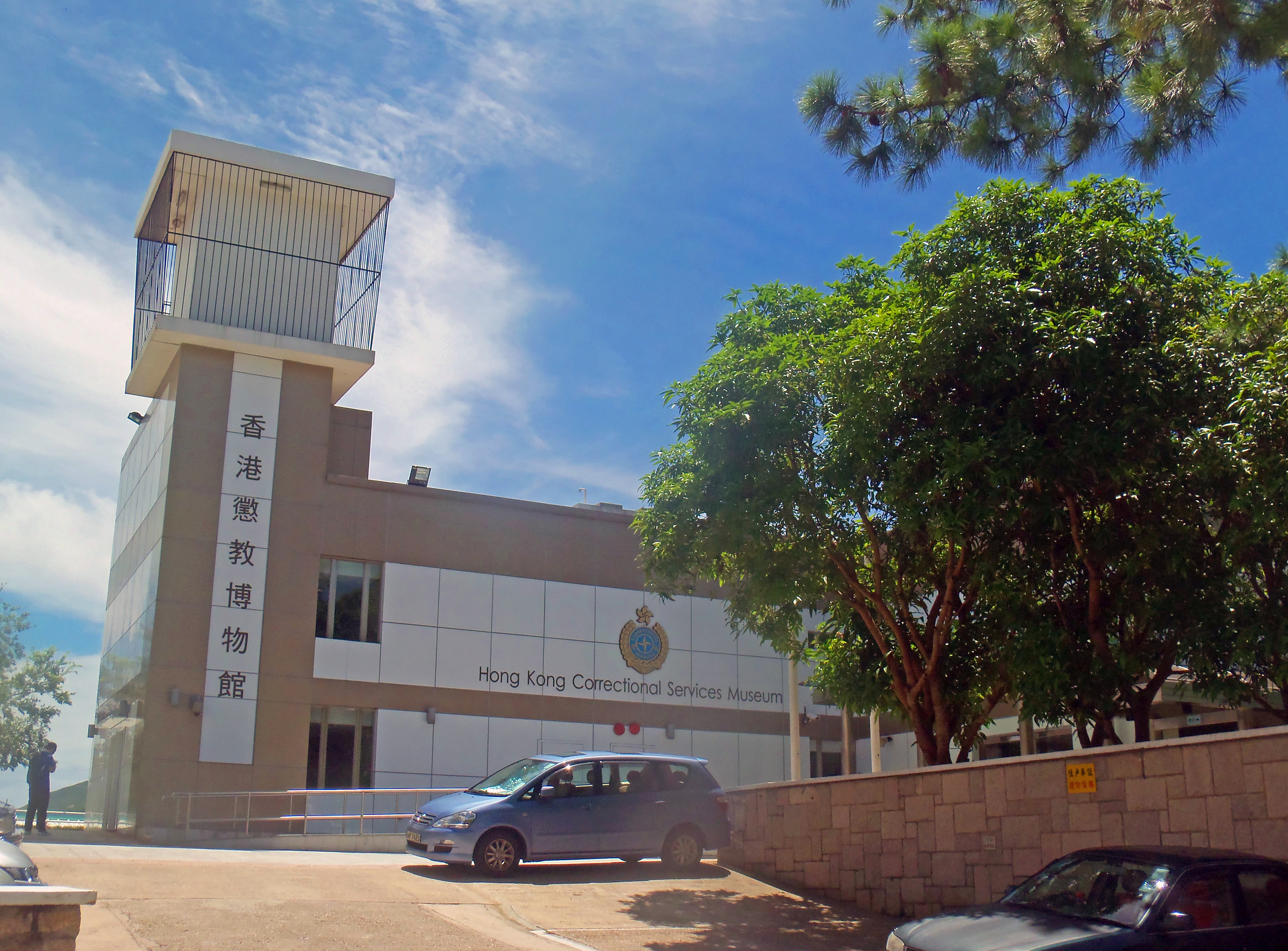
Correctional Services Department Museum

In August 2000, the Prisoner Complaints Investigation Department and the Inspection and Management Unit were awarded the ISO 9002 Quality Certificate. In February 2001, the Personnel and Training Division was reorganized and renamed the Human Resources Division, and in January 2002, the Inspection and Management Division was renamed the Quality Assurance Division. In July 2002, a decree was signed on the establishment of rehabilitation centers. At the same time, the first such center was established - Lai Chi on Lantau Island.

In the same month, the prison complex on the island of Hei Ling Chau received the ISO 14001 standard for its environmental control system.

In November 2002, the Department of Correctional Services Museum opened in Stanley, next to the prison of the same name and the Prison Staff Training Institute.

Also in November 2002, the charity organization "Association for the Care of Rehabilitated Criminals" was founded. Its main purposes were to publicise the problems and needs of former prisoners, and to organize assistance in adapting to life after release. In September 2003, the Hong Kong Correctional Services Department Training Institute signed a cooperation agreement with the Mainland Central Correctional Police Institute. In December 2003, the department hosted the 23rd Asia-Pacific Conference of Correctional Administrators in Hong Kong, which was attended by about 100 delegates from 25 countries.

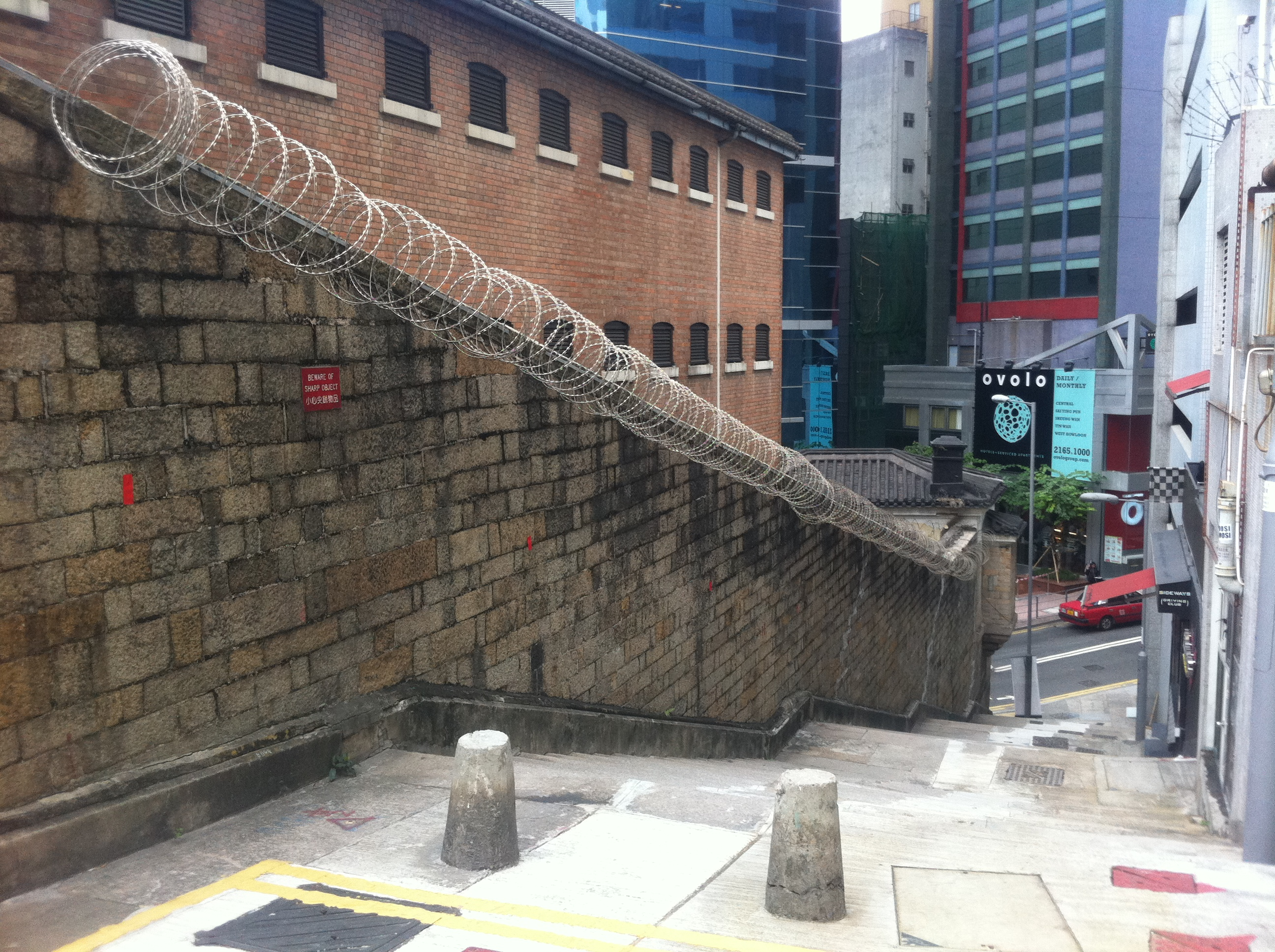
Victoria Prison

In February 2005, the drug storage and distribution system at the Siu Lam Psychiatric Center was certified conforming to ISO 9001.

In March 2005, the second Guangdong-Hong Kong Prison Forum was held in Hong Kong. In the same month, the Lo Wu Correctional Facility closed and was later moved to another location.

The Castle Peak Bay Immigration Center opened in August 2005.

In December 2005, the oldest penal institution in Hong Kong, Victoria Prison, was shut down.

In July 2006, the Lai Chi Kok Correctional Facility opened, and a vocational training center opened at the Lai San Correctional Facility. In May 2008, the Taitam Gap Correctional Facility closed, which was later moved to another location, and the Lai King Correctional Facility began operating. In February 2009, the industrial section of the department was reorganized into the Industrial and Vocational Training Section, subordinate to the rehabilitation division. In June 2009, the Sachey Detention Center was renamed a correctional facility. In October 2009, amendments to Hong Kong law were adopted, according to which prisoners with voting rights were allowed to vote in local government elections. The first elections in Hong Kong correctional institutions were held in 2013.

In January 2010 a modern production and educational complex opened at the ik Ukp rison. In February 2010 МMapoupinprison and the Tong Fuk Centre merged into the Tong Fuk Medium Security Correctional Facility, and a separate unit of the Hei Ling Chau Drug Treatment Center was converted into the Nei Kwu Women's Correctional Facility. In April 2010, the Castle Peak Bay Immigration Center came under the jurisdiction of the Hong Kong Immigration Department (however, employees of the Department of Correctional Services continue to work in the center, guarding blocks for detained illegal immigrants). The updated Lo Wu Correctional Institution opened in August 2010, after a major reconstruction, and in March 2011 a psychological gymnasium opened within it.

In April 2011, Hong Kong hosted the next prison forum of the penitentiary departments of Beijing, Guangdong, Hong Kong and Macau. In March 2012, a new detention block was opened at the Lai Chi Kok Reception Center. In January 2013, the Tung Tau Correctional Facility became the first "non-smoking" adult male prison in Hong Kong. In March 2013, Lai Chi Kok Prison opened Hong Kong's second psychological services center for staff and their families. In April 2013, the Lo Wu Correctional Facility launched a program to reduce food waste. In June 2013, the department opened its first collection center for prisoners ' urine samples.

== The Department of Correctional Services ==
The Department of Correctional Services of Hong Kong is the main agency of the Hong Kong Government that carries out criminal sentences, as well as rehabilitating former prisoners. It implements a wide range of programs aimed at the correction and rehabilitation of various types of prisoners: repeat offenders, first-time convicts, teenagers and drug addicts. As of 2013, the department employed more than 6,800 employees.

The department's headquarters are located in the Wan Chai Tower (Wan Chai District).

The department has signed memorandums of cooperation with the prison authorities of Canada (2001), Singapore (2003), Korea (2005), Macau (2006) and Guangdong (2014). It holds regular forums and seminars with the prison departments of Beijing, Guangdong, and Macau, as well as sports competitions between staff from Hong Kong, Macau, and Guangdong.

=== Structure ===
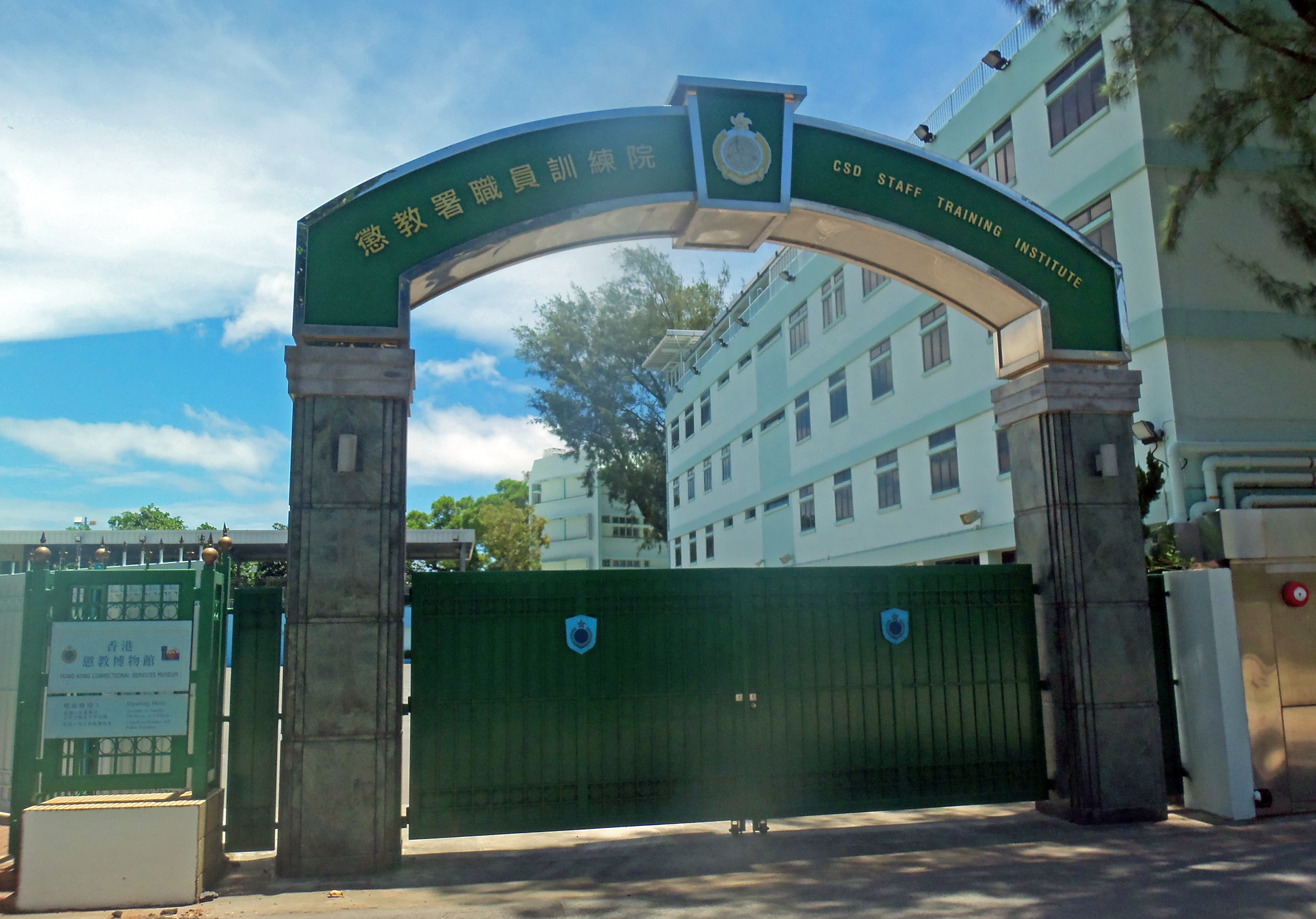
Staff Training Institute

The department is headed by the Commissioner and his Deputy, to whom report the Civil Secretary, and four Assistant Commissioners responsible for operations, prisoner rehabilitation, quality assurance and human resources, respectively.

The Public Relations and External Affairs Section, the Administrative Section, the Accounting Section, the Statistics and Research Section, the Work and Planning Section, and the Technology Implementation Section report to the Civil Secretary.

To the Assistant Commissioner for Operations report: the Criminal Administration Section, the Health Section, and the Criminal Operations Section (which covers all correctional facilities, as well as the escort and support unit).

To the Assistant Commissioner for Rehabilitation report: the Industry and Vocational Training Section, the Psychological Services Section, and the Rehabilitation Section (the latter covers three residential homes for former prisoners released under supervision and on the path of correction).

To the Assistant Commissioner for Quality Assurance report: the Inspection and Safety Division, the Complaints Investigation Division, and the Management Services Division.

To the Assistant Commissioner for Human Resources report the Staff Training Institute and the Human Resources and Social Policy Division (this division also provides psychological assistance to the Department's employees). The bulk of the staff consists of superintendents, officers, assistant officers, instructors, assistant education officers, and clinical psychologists. A newly recruited or assistant officer receives 26 or 23 weeks respectively of basic training, including internships in correctional facilities. After passing the exams and signing the contract, officers and their assistants regularly take advanced training courses, specialist training courses and command courses at the institute, or remotely using electronic programs.

The Escort and Support Team is responsible for transporting prisoners to courts, public hospitals, and between institutions. It also supports department officers during emergencies (riots, riots, fires, and escapes). In addition, the group guards prisoners in temporary detention cells in courts (in the Supreme Court of Appeal and District Courts), in the Kunton Transit Center, and in special units of the Queen Mary and Queen Elizabeth State Hospitals. The canine service of the department has more than 60 dogs, whose duties include patrolling the perimeter of institutions and detecting drugs.There are health centers for the staff of the department and their families in Lai Chi Kok and Stanley, where, among other things, they are provided with qualified psychological assistance. In the 2012-2013 fiscal year, the main items of expenditure of the department were the purchase of goods and equipment - $39.42 million, uniforms of prisoners - $10.56 million, uniforms of staff - $9.55 million. The department's revenue totaled $60 million, including $51 million in rent for the use of public housing.

The department's officers are armed with rubber batons, gas canisters, gas pistols, rifles with rubber bullets, as well as Smith & Wesson 10 revolvers, Remington 870 shotguns and Ruger Mini-14 rifles. (Lethal weapons can only be used by guards on towers in maximum security prisons, officers escorting prisoners to other institutions, and officers involved in the pursuit of a fugitive or riot suppression.)

The Commissioner of the Department of Correctional Services (along with the Chiefs of Police, Fire Department, Immigration Department, Customs and Excise Department, Civil Aid Service, and Medical Aid Service) reports to the Security Secretary of the Government of Hong Kong.

== Correctional Institutions ==
As of 2013, the Hong Kong Department of Correctional Services operated 25 minimum, medium, and maximum security facilities, including prisons, reception centers, a psychiatric center, and detention, training, rehabilitation, and drug treatment centers.

10 institutions are designed for adult men (3 maximum security level, 3 medium and 4 minimum),

6 institutions are for young male criminals (1- maximum security, 1-minimum, 1 detention center, 1-training center and 2-rehabilitation centers),

3 institutions are for young female criminals (1 training center and 2 rehabilitation centers),

2 institutions are for adult women.

Six of these correctional facilities also receive arrested men and women of various age groups awaiting trial. In addition, the department operates a mixed psychological center and three institutions that treat drug addiction (two for males, and one for females).

People sentenced to prison are assigned to correctional facilities by gender, age, and safety rating, which takes into account the severity of the crime committed, the degree of danger to others, whether the person is a repeat offender or a first-time convict. All adult prisoners deemed physically fit by the department are required to work six days a week. The distribution of jobs takes into account the availability of the specialty, the safety rating, the balance of offers and the personal preferences of the prisoner. For their work, prisoners receive income that can be used to buy government-approved products or additional food in the cafeteria (hygiene products, vitamins, writing materials, snacks and drinks).

Convicted young men and women are required to participate in a rehabilitation program consisting of education (half the day) and the development of working professions (half the day). In addition, sports, music and dance, reading, chess and theater performances are available to them.

Young offenders assigned to training centers stay there from 6 months to 3 years. After release, they are under mandatory supervision for 3 years.

Young offenders assigned to a detention center stay there from 1 to 6 months (ages 14 – 21) or from 3 to 12 months (ages 21 – 25), and after release, they are monitored for a year.

In rehabilitation centers, young offenders stay from 3 to 9 months, and after release, they are under supervision for a year.

Drug addicts sentenced to treatment by the courts undergo a course in a special center (from 2 to 12 months with annual supervision after release). The treatment program includes strict discipline, therapy, and physical labor. For drug addicts in regular institutions and prisoners suspected of drug addiction, regular urine tests are mandatory. In the psychiatric center, visiting psychiatrists working in public hospitals do the assessment and examination for the courts. The prisoner's diet is adjusted according to religious requirements and the norms established by the authorities. Prisoners awaiting trial can opt out of the prison canteen and order food at special restaurants licensed by the department, if they wish.

Prisoners have access to television, newspapers and library collections, they can participate in accessible religious ceremonies and send and receive an unlimited number of letters. They can apply to the administration for visits by relatives; those prisoners who are not visited by their families can be visited by members of volunteer organizations accredited by the authorities. Young offenders are provided with compulsory education and vocational training programs, while adult prisoners are trained in the evening on a voluntary basis. All prisoners can apply for educational grants and grants that cover the cost of tuition, books, and other educational materials. At the end of the course, those who wish to do so may take international exams.

Relatives and friends can visit those arrested on a daily basis. Each visit should not exceed 15 minutes, the number of visitors should not be more than two people (including infants and children). Relatives and friends can visit convicts twice a month. Each visit should not exceed 30 minutes, the number of visitors should not be more than three people (including infants and children). A visitor visiting an arrested person or a prisoner for the first time must pass the identification procedure. For relatives who have difficulty arriving at the correctional facility (for example, due to age, health condition, or pregnancy), the administration can arrange a video conference with the inmate. A prisoner who violates discipline and prison rules may be deprived of the right to visit relatives for a certain period of time.

Once every two weeks or monthly (depending on the type of institution), each prison is visited by two magistrates. They investigate complaints from prisoners and examine the living and eating conditions of prisoners for compliance with the standards. Visits are made at the discretion of the judges without prior notice to the prison administration. Throughout the facilities (including punishment cells), there are booths with instructions explaining the basic rights of prisoners and providing coordinates where the prisoner can complain. These instructions are printed in the main languages of communication of Hong Kong prisoners (Chinese, English and Vietnamese). All correspondence between prisoners and legislators, justices of the peace, and the Ombudsman cannot be read or even opened for contraband without the prisoner being present.

Usually, a correctional facility consists of a residential block( dormitory), kitchen, dining room, laundry, production workshops, recreation area, gym, medical unit, library, and staff offices (administration, psychologists, teachers, doctors, and security guards); some institutions have public gardens and outdoor landscaping areas.

All correctional facilities are divided geographically into five groups. An updated list may be found in the article on Hong Kong Correctional Services.

=== Closed camps and correctional facilities ===
The first Vietnamese refugee camp was opened in Hong Kong in 1973 near the Kaitak Airport, and in 1988 four more detention centers were opened-near the Saekkon Air Base, in the Moanson district, on the islands of Hai Island and Taiachau. In October 1991, there were more than 64,000 Vietnamese asylum seekers in the colony, prompting authorities to push for more extensive repatriation. The first camp to close was the center near the Saekkon base in 1992, then the one on Taiachau Island in 1996. The centres in Kaitak and Maonsan closed in early 1998. In May 1998, the last Vietnamese refugee detention center on Hai Island was closed.

In December 2005, the oldest penal institution in Hong Kong, Victoria Prison, ceased to operate (officially decommissioned in March 2006). It opened in August 1841, and until the construction of the Stanley Prison in 1937, all sentences for the punishment of criminals were carried out here. The prison was badly damaged in 1941 during the Japanese invasion, and reopened in 1946 after repairs. In the 1970s, Victoria Prison became a major transit and repatriation center for Vietnamese refugees. The prison complex included an administrative block, buildings with cells, a kitchen, dining rooms, a hospital, a laundry and a printing shop. In September 1995, it was declared a historical monument. The building still retains its Victorian era granite and brick facade.

The average daily population of correctional facilities in Hong Kong in 2013 (2004) was 9,240 (13,138), including 1,567 arrested (1,555), 6,492 incarcerated (10,119), 790 residents of drug treatment centers (702), 200 residents of training centers (283), 53 residents of detention centers (169), 105 residents of rehabilitation centers (128).

In 2013, 7,728 adult men, 3,405 adult women, 267 young men (under 21) and 87 young women (under 21) were sentenced to prison, 6,506 adult men, 1,957 adult women, 1,228 young men (under 21) and 202 young women (under 21) were arrested, 121 young men and 7 young women were assigned to training centers, 116 young men (under 25) were assigned to a detention center, 125 young men and 31 young women were assigned to rehabilitation centers, 1,030 adults and 193 young convicts (including 932 men and 291 women) were sent to treatment centers for drug addiction.

== Medical and Rehabilitation Institutions ==
Primary health and health care services are provided at all hours in all the Department's facilities (in close cooperation with the Hong Kong Department of Health). All new arrivals undergo a medical examination and quarantine. They are also checked for infectious diseases. Those suffering from withdrawal symptoms undergo detoxification in a special hospital. Prisoners who require intensive medical care (e.g. surgery, dental and orthopedic services) or consultation with a specialist who is not available in the correctional institution are escorted to special blocks of public hospitals. Pre- and post-natal care is provided to women in institutions, but infants are usually left in public hospitals until the mother is released.

In addition to correctional facilities, the Hong Kong Department of Correctional Services also operates three halfway houses, and two blocks for prisoners in public hospitals which provide services to a population of 9,200 people. The average daily population of the three houses in 2013 was 33 people (2009–53 people, 2004 - 47 people). Rehabilitated criminals released under surveillance from a detention center, training center or drug treatment center, as well as those with special needs, can be placed for a certain period of time in homes (dormitories) for those who are on the right path. Also, released prisoners who temporarily do not have housing can settle here. During the day, all the residents of the hostel go to work or study, and at night they return (on weekends and holidays, those without disciplinary infractions can stay with their families). After a certain period of time, the residents of the hostel are allowed to move home, but they remain under supervision by the authorities.

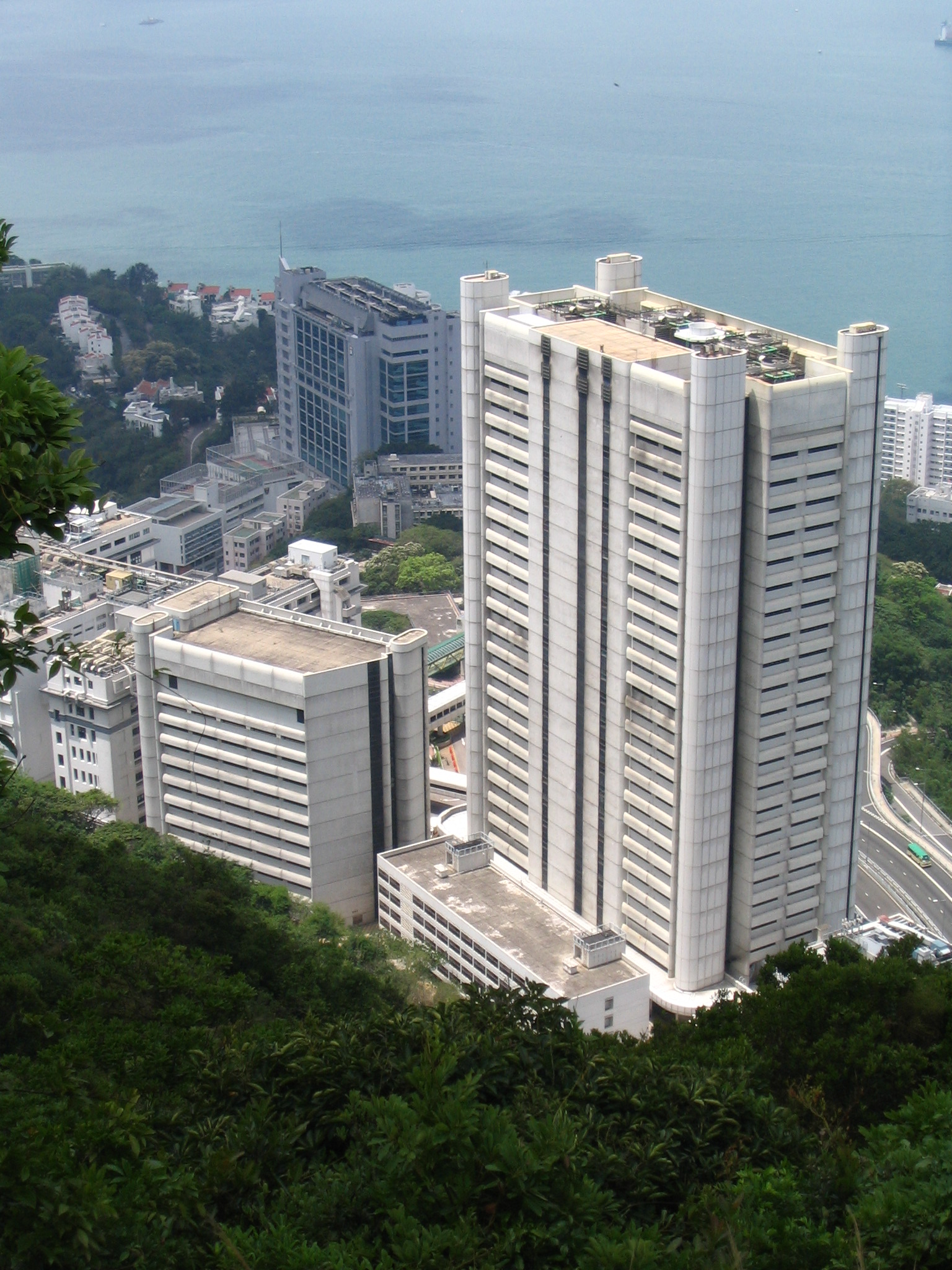
Queen Mary Hospital

- Pelican House is designed to accommodate adult men released under supervision from drug treatment centers, as well as from prisons under various early release programs. Founded in 1995, moved to its current location in 2004, located in Kowloon Thon. Capacity-40 people.
- Phoenix House is designed to house young men who have passed through detention centers, training centers, or drug treatment centers. Founded in 1983, it is located in Kowloon-Thon district. Capacity-30 people.
- Bauhinia House is designed to house women released under supervision from training centers or drug treatment centers, as well as from prisons under various early release programs. It was founded in 1984, moved to its current location in 2002, and is located in the Tailamchun district (on the territory of the Wailan Rehabilitation Center). Capacity-24 people[.
- The Queen Mary Hospital's custodial ward is designed to accommodate adult male prisoners. Founded in 1991, it is located in the Pok Fu Lam district. Capacity — 22 hospital beds.
- The Queen Elizabeth Hospital's custodial ward is designed to accommodate adult male and female prisoners. Founded in 1992, it is located in the Yaumatei district. Capacity-24 hospital beds.

== Other places of incarceration ==
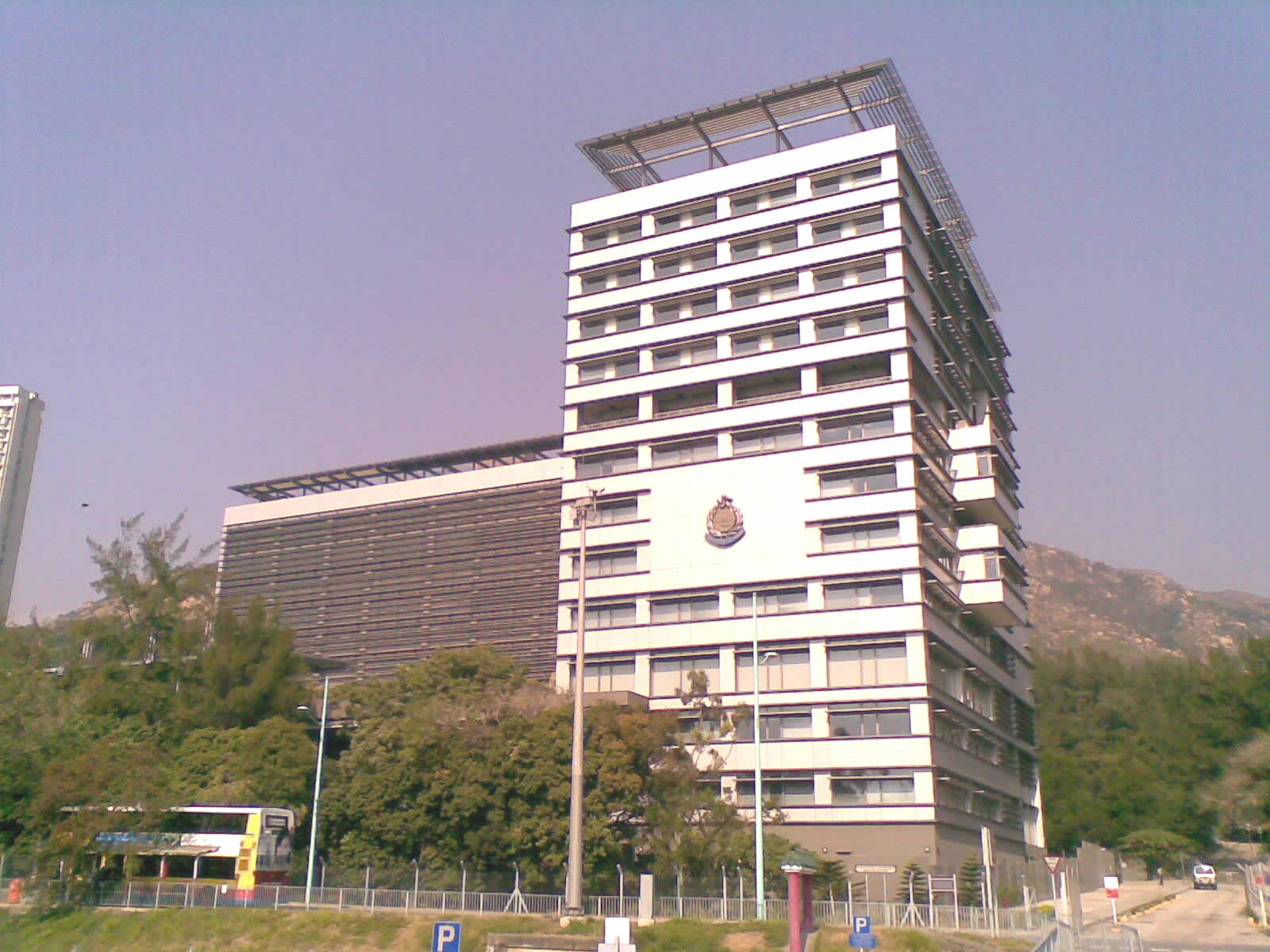
Castle Peak Bay Immigration Centre

Illegal immigrants or visa violators detained in Hong Kong are taken for screening and filtering to the Immigration Tower in the Wan Chai, area, where there are several pre-trial detention cells, or to the Ma Tau Kok Detention Center (open since February 1998, capacity-87 people). Illegal immigrants who have committed criminal offenses are transferred to the Lai Chi Kok Reception center, and those who are waiting for deportation outside Hong Kong or have filed an appeal are held in the Castle Peak Bay Immigration Center (open since August 2005, capacity-400 people, who are jointly cared for by employees of the Immigration Department and the Department of Correctional Services).

In addition, temporary detention cells are available in all district police stations and regional headquarters of the Hong Kong Police Force (regional offices of Hong Kong Island, West and East Kowloon, Northern and Southern New Territories, Maritime region), in some individual police units (for example, in the organized crime unit or Narcotics Bureau), as well as in the Supreme Court of Appeals and District Court. The Hong Kong garrison of the People's Liberation Army of China has its own separate pre-trial detention cells for violators of military discipline.

== Supervision system ==
Certain categories of criminals in the process of rehabilitation (both before and after release from prison) are monitored for various periods of time. As of 2013, with the help of community organizations and councils, the Hong Kong Department of Correctional Services was monitoring 2,300 former prisoners, trying to prevent them from reoffending. Inspectors visit homes and workplaces, monitor conditions of early release, and conduct drug tests. An indicator of the success of the surveillance program is the percentage of former criminals who have committed repeated crimes or started taking drugs again (on average, more than 1,100 people violate the conditions of supervision during the year).

Some young criminals held in a detention, training, rehabilitation or drug treatment center have the opportunity, under the supervision of the department, to visit their families or get a day job in the outside world. In the evening they are required to return to the institution and check in with the duty officer.

== Prison production ==
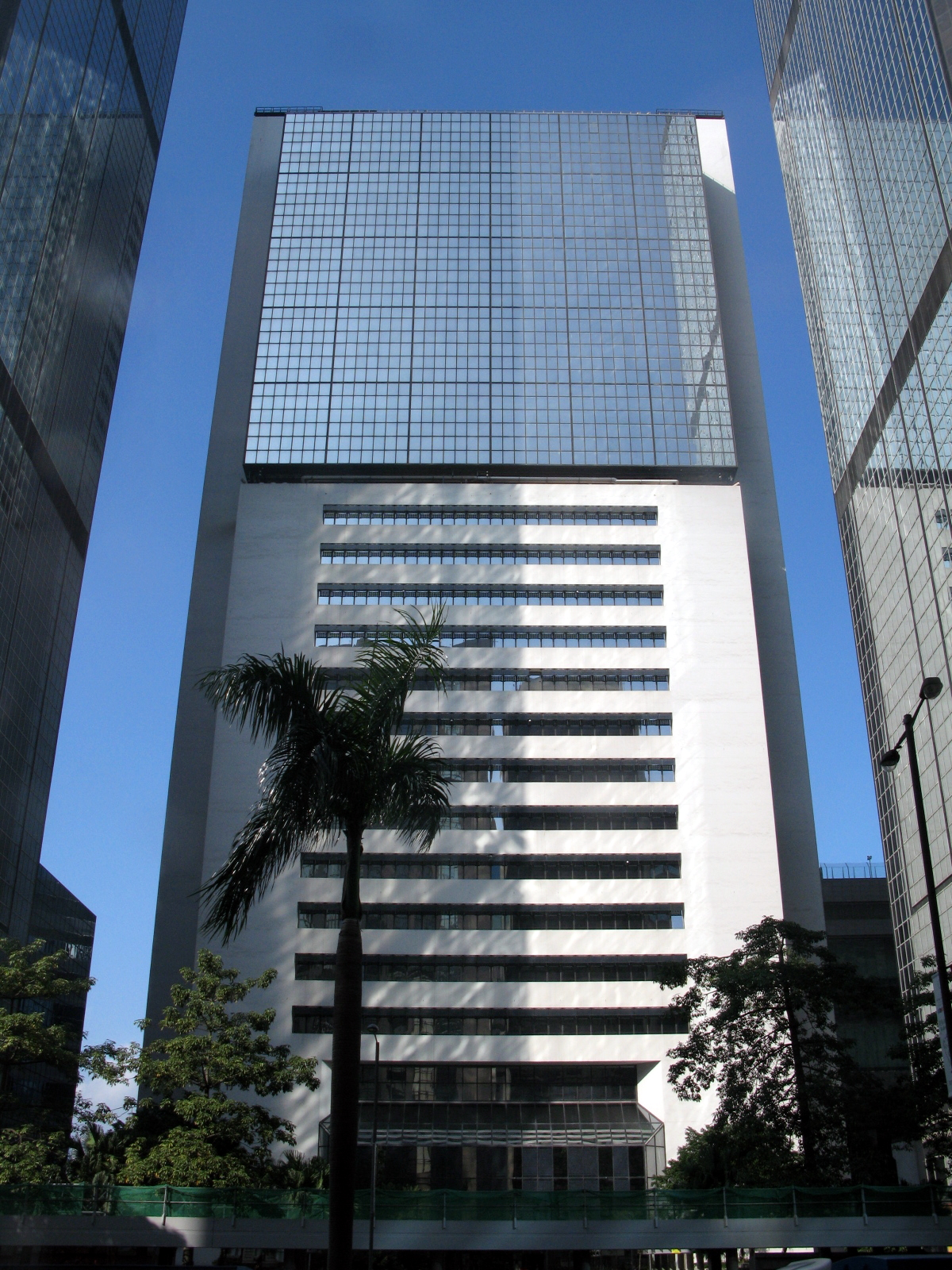
Ваньчай-тауэр — headquarters of the CSD

As of 2013, on average, more than 4,600 prisoners were employed daily in the Department of Correctional Services' manufacturing sector (all physically fit adult prisoners must work six days a week). More than 130 workshops in Hong Kong correctional institutions produce road signs, waterproof shoes and belts for prison staff, wooden furniture for government offices and schools, various protective clothing and uniforms (including for police, prison staff and prisoners), medical masks, bed linen and dressing gowns for public hospitals, plastic street bins and garbage containers, plastic tables and chairs, metal fences, road tiles and curbs, folders and envelopes for government departments. Prisoners also wash and iron the linen and uniforms of public hospitals and fire departments, bind and laminate old books from public libraries, schools and universities, and print books and magazines.

In 2013, the department produced $364 million worth of goods and services at market prices (including territory maintenance services, the total commercial value exceeded $379 million). Among the products — 14 million masks for the Department of Health, hospital Management, Fire Department, Department of Food Hygiene and the Environment, 400 sets of furniture for the North Lantau Hospital, more than 2,500 sets of metal fences, 30,000 street paving slabs and kerbs, 2,500 square meters of reflective signs and 7,500 road signs for roads and bike paths. Three commercial laundries and a road sign shop at Stanley Prison have received ISO 9001 certification, a leather goods shop there has a laboratory for water resistance tests, and graphic shops at Stanley and Lovu Prisons are equipped with state-of-the-art computer equipment. In 2013, new equipment was installed in the sewing workshops of the Lo Wu and Tun Tau Correctional Institutions, as well as in the metalworking workshop of the Tai Lam Correctional Institution.

In 1996, the department's almost 150 workshops produced goods and services worth $431 million (in 1995 - $398 million). Some workshops had simple operations that required a large number of employees (for example, manual production of cotton swabs), and some machines employed two or three people instead of the one needed. The prisoners' salary was minimal, and 10% of the income was withheld in favor of the state.

== Social programmes ==
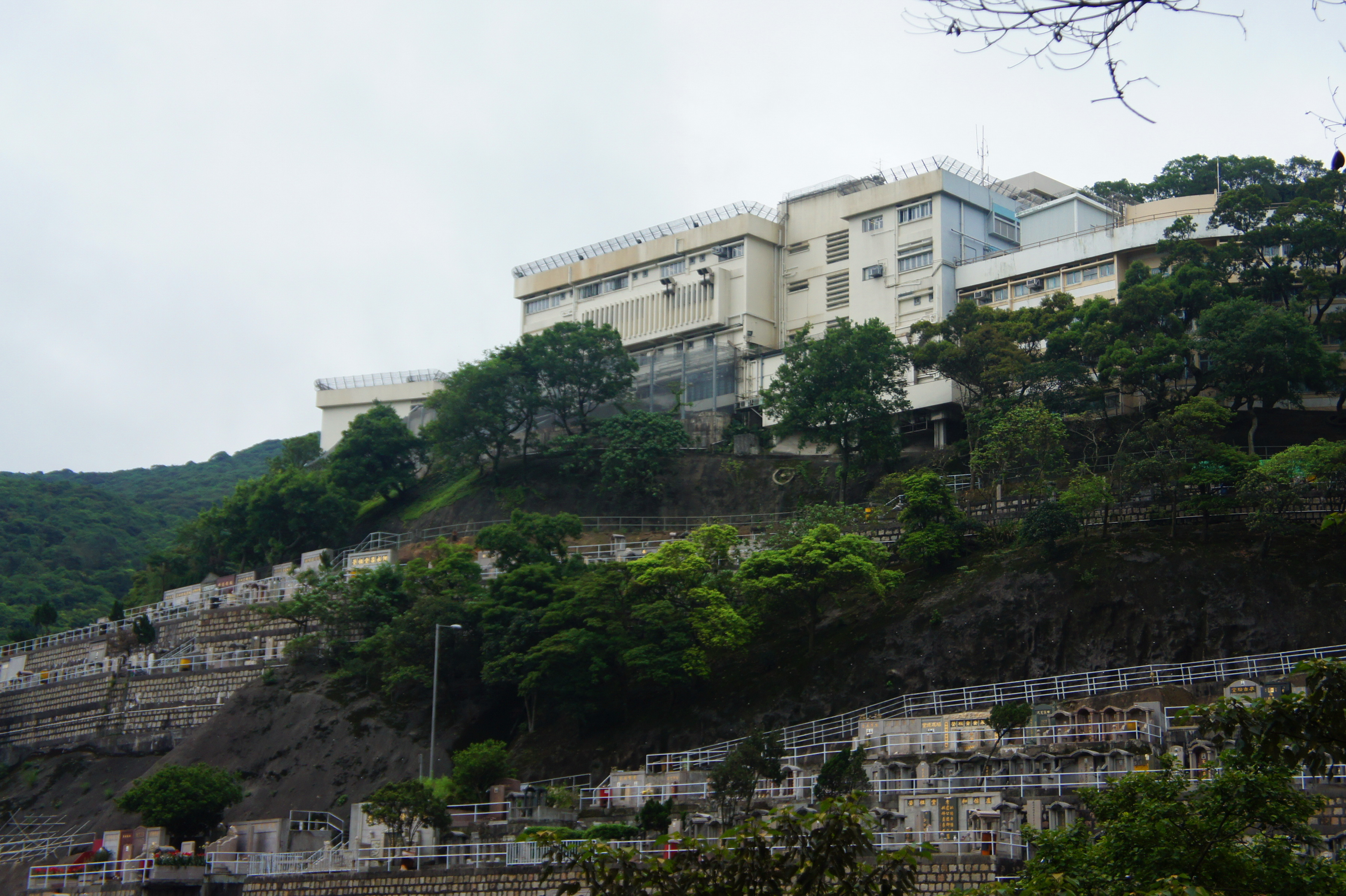
Tai Tam Gap Institution

The most important component of the rehabilitation of prisoners is their vocational training in skills and working specialties that will help them reintegrate into society with a better chance of employment. The department has prepared several accredited market-oriented training programs; the department's diplomas and certificates are recognized by all public and private organizations in Hong Kong. Vocational training is mandatory for young prisoners; they are also offered part-time work.

Professions for which training is offered in correctional institutions include locksmiths, carpenters, crane operators, builders, cashiers, salesmen, waiters, cooks and taxi drivers. Several trusts assist financially in obtaining vocational training: The Prisoners' Educational Trust Fund, founded in December 1995, the New Life Foundation, founded in February 2009, the Prisoners' Educational Grant Fund, founded in March 2009, the Association for the Care of Rehabilitated Criminals, founded in March 2011, and the Angel Educational Foundation, founded in January 2013. As well as vocational training, full-time secondary education is also mandatory for young prisoners, which helps to improve their academic standards and allows them to pass local or international public exams. For adult prisoners on a voluntary basis, there are numerous training groups, distance learning courses and interest groups run by accredited volunteers from public or religious organizations.

The Hong Kong Department of Correctional Services, through propaganda, educational lectures and courses, actively promotes the government's anti-smoking policy in correctional institutions, encouraging prisoners who quit smoking in every possible way. Since January 2013, the Tunthau Correctional Facility has been designated as a non-smoking prison.

The Department of Correctional Services also actively promotes environmental protection. For this purpose, a program is being implemented in correctional institutions to save food, reduce food waste and convert waste into organic fertilizers. Currently, a food waste reduction program has been implemented in Lovu, Mahan and Neiku prisons. In close cooperation with more than 80 non-governmental organizations, the department's staff implements a variety of rehabilitation programs, including cultural and entertainment, sports and religious programs, as well as providing legal advice and future employment opportunities to prisoners.

Much attention is paid to providing psychological assistance for prisoners. Staff and visiting psychologists and psychiatrists draw up psychological profiles of prisoners, which help courts, supervisory boards and the management of institutions to make decisions on early release, and distribute prisoners in groups, avoiding conflicts. So as to effectively develop rehabilitation programs and treat prisoners for drug addiction, the department has created an automated system to detect and identify the risks and needs of incarcerated people. Therapeutic and psychological programs include combating bouts of uncontrolled anger, correcting social misbehavior, preventing domestic violence, personal growth, developing a constructive lifestyle, encouraging family members to rehabilitate young criminals, and treating sex offenders and drug addicts.

Since March 2004, a special volunteer group of the department (CSD Rehabilitation Volunteer Group), consisting of teachers, social workers, accountants, pensioners and students, has been organizing courses on computer science, foreign languages and cultural traditions of other peoples in prisons on a regular basis, as well as conducting lessons in Tai chi, calligraphy, painting, cosmetology, crafts and rugby. Since August 2004, a campaign has been launched in Hong Kong to encourage private sector firms to hire former prisoners. As part of a juvenile delinquency prevention program, launched in January 2006, teenagers visit the Department of Correctional Services museum and some correctional facilities, where they learn about the lives of prisoners.

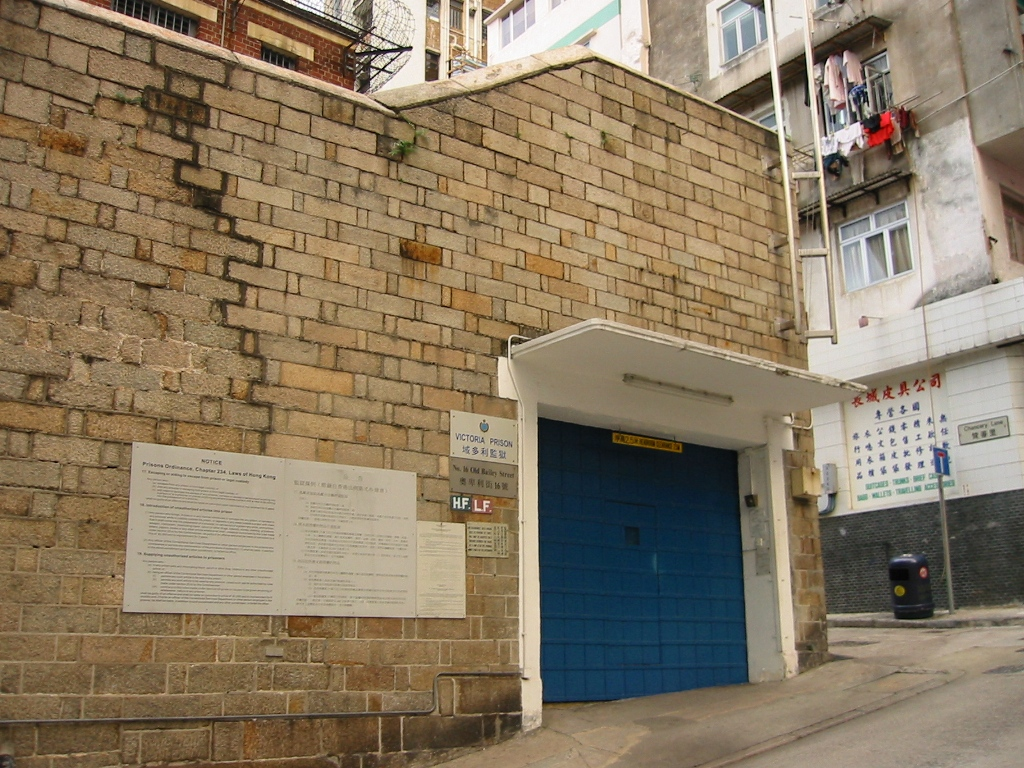
Victoria Prison

In February 2009, the sex offender rehabilitation program was launched as a joint campaign between the department and the Catholic charity Caritas. "Job fairs" are regularly held, where private entrepreneurs offer jobs to those waiting for release or former prisoners. The department, with the Hong Kong Education Bureau, has several programs to train incarcerated adolescents (they can receive both secondary and higher education, as well as various working specialties, ad computer and language skills). The department, together with the Hong Kong Broadcasting Company (RTHK), also produces a multi-part television documentary drama "The Road Back", the first part of which was released in 2001 (Seasons II-V in 2002, 2004, 2006 and 2008).

== Religion in prison ==
Staff chaplains coordinate religious services for prisoners. They are assisted by volunteer priests of various denominations who conduct rites and provide psychological assistance to the faithful, and by various religious organizations that provide a wide range of spiritual and social services in correctional institutions. Among the chaplains and volunteers, Christians predominate, while the bulk of the prisoners belong to traditional Chinese beliefs (Buddhism, Taoism and Confucianism). Only a few institutions have small Chinese altars. However, human rights activists did not in 1997 note any violations of religious freedom in Hong Kong institutions.

== Problems and incidents ==
Hong Kong's prisons have long had strong local triads and criminal traditions. Prisoners have in the past secretly made from improvised materials and kept in secret places shivs, knives and even machetes, as well as various devices for smoking opium, playing cards and dice, and pens adapted for tattooing.

In April 1973, there were large-scale riots in Stanley Prison, after which the entire prison system underwent reform and modernization. In August and September 1989, riots broke out in the Vietnamese refugee camps of Saekkon and Tai Chau, and required intervention by the British army. Many rioters were armed with machetes and even had homemade gas masks to protect them from tear gas. In 1997, people from mainland China made up about 20% of Hong Kong prison inmates (after serving their sentences, they were immediately sent back to the mainland). There were also more than 800 other foreign prisoners in Hong Kong, mostly Vietnamese, Filipinos, Pakistanis and Thais. In June 2000, a riot broke out at the Hei Lin Chau Drug treatment center.

Despite the efforts of the prison authorities (searches of cells and visitors, selective drug testing of prisoners, and strict sanctions for the possession and use of prohibited drugs), drugs continued to be a frequent occurrence in Hong Kong correctional institutions in the 1990s. However, the previously difficult situation with drug trafficking in prisons has been partially corrected. Gaming and betting (for money), on the contrary, were a problem that the prison authorities fought less successfully. Because of this, many prisoners in the cells under the protection of the administration had unpaid debts and interest on them. Another problem with the prison system was the large number of adult male triad members. In some prisons, they made up the majority of the population. Triad members accounted for a significant part of the intimidation and violence, including the use of offensive weapons. The most despised and consequently oppressed category of prisoners were those who gave evidence, giving away their accomplices under plea bargains, as well as those convicted of sexual crimes (especially rapists and paedophiles), former police officers and police informants.

There was some tension between local prisoners on the one hand and those from Vietnam and mainland China on the other, especially in maximum-security prisons. For example, in June 1995, three groups of local Chinese prisoners attacked several Vietnamese at the same time in different parts of the Shek Pik prison. In January 1997, eight Vietnamese prisoners were injured in a fight involving tables and chairs in a classroom at the Pik Uk Correctional Facility. In February 1997, a fight broke out in the Stanley Prison dining room between groups of local and Vietnamese prisoners. There were also frequent attacks on staff by prisoners, especially in Stanley, Shek Pik and Lai Chi Kok prisons (sometimes even using shivs, pieces of furniture or sharpened brush handles).

To punish prisoners who violated discipline, the administration widely used segregation in punishment cells and blocks (up to 28 days), deprivation of the right to timely release (up to one month), deprivation of privileges such as the ability to buy goods in the prison canteen (for up to three months), deprivation of prison income. Previously, punished prisoners were forbidden to send and receive letters, but this restriction was later lifted. Prisoners were confined in the punishment cells 23 hours each day, leaving under escort only for a walk and a shower. Meals were also taken in the cells. During disciplinary segregation, violators were forbidden to smoke, listen to a radio or music player, or read (except for textbooks and religious literature), but they were required to work.

In addition to disciplinary measures, many prisoners were subjected to administrative segregation (some even for the entire term of their imprisonment). First, there were those who needed protection from other prisoners, such as former police officers or prosecution witnesses. They were not deprived of privileges, often were outside the cell, but went out for exercise in a separate group. Second are those who, for some reason, have asked for protection themselves, for example, debtors in gambling or violators of unwritten prison rules. They were deprived of privileges for a year, then they were made some allowances (to have a radio, books, etc.). The third and most problematic category of prisoners in administrative segregation were criminal leaders and recidivists who were able to independently violate discipline or incite a group of prisoners to disobey. As a rule, they were isolated for three to four months.

One further punishment for breaches of discipline was to transfer the prisoner to a higher-security facility, with stricter conditions of detention. In higher-security prisons, there was also usually significant overcrowding of the accommodation, another factor with which the administration could influence a "difficult" prisoner. Prisoners whose behavior could not be corrected, who were in conflict with the staff or other prisoners, were transferred to the Siulam Psychiatric center, and held for six months under the special BAU (Behavior Adjustment Unit) program. Since these prisoners were not mentally ill, they were not subjected to psychiatric treatment, limited only to psychological recommendations.

The bulk of the prisoners were held in hostel type residential blocks for 10 to 60 people. Some men in maximum security facilities (Stanley and Shek Pik prisons, Lai Chi Kok reception center) were kept in cells (either single, for especially dangerous criminals, or shared). The administration made sure that the cells and dormitories were kept in order, so that prisoners did not keep prohibited items among their personal belongings. Radios and audio players were allowed in living areas, but computers, televisions, and posters on the walls were banned.

The dormitories had rows of metal bunk beds on wooden flooring, and the cells had single-tier plastic beds. (In the disciplinary and administrative segregation cells, the beds were removed for the day so that the prisoners did not lie on them. In the living areas there were bedside tables and shelves for personal belongings, triangular plastic tables and stools. The toilets were equipped with modern pans (in new facilities) or holes in the floor (in the old facilities). In Victoria and Stanley prisons, there were not enough toilets in the cells, so many prisoners had to use buckets (since the cells were locked from evening to morning, the prisoners were in close, fetid rooms). Hong Kong typically has cool winters and hot and humid summers, but with the exception of some hospital wards, most of the living quarters had no heating or air conditioning; at Stanley Prison, the cells did not even have fans.

The administration provided inmates with shoes, clothing, underwear, towels, blankets and pillows. All clothes and underwear were issued clean and regularly exchanged for washing. In prisons where different groups of prisoners were held, each group's clothing had a specific color and style. The beds had no mattresses, but thin reed mats were used. Every morning, the prisoners rolled up the mats, blankets, and pillows into a sort of cube and placed them at the head of the bed. According to the norms of personal hygiene, prisoners were allowed to wash every day, and their hair had to be short.

The prisoners' food, developed by dietitians, was varied and served in sufficient portions from kitchens that met sanitary standards. The diet included vegetables, fruits, meat and fish. Various ethnic and religious groups had their own menus — Asian (Chinese), European, Indo-Pakistani, vegetarian (for Buddhists), as well as a special menu for patients with diabetes or ulcers. The food was tested before serving, with the results recorded in the accounting log. Usually, meals were served in prison canteens, but for particularly dangerous criminals, meals were provided in the cells. Persons in pre-trial detention could order food from outside (even, in small amounts, beer and wine). Smoking was allowed, but restricted during the working day.

The medical staff of the correctional institutions had the necessary qualifications and equipment. In Hong Kong prisons, there was no mandatory testing for HIV infection, and only a small percentage of prisoners were identified as carriers of the human immunodeficiency virus. They were not separated from the general mass of prisoners and their diagnosis was kept secret from the staff. In prisons, the use of condoms was promoted, but the condoms themselves were not available to prisoners. The staff in every possible way suppressed and denied homosexual contacts between prisoners (in the second half of the 1990s, this topic was tacitly considered taboo).

The staff of the British Royal College of Psychiatrists, who inspected the Siulam Psychiatric Center in 1995, expressed concern in their report about outdated methods used in the institution and the lack of qualified nurses. An acute problem was the overcrowding of facilities for female prisoners, whose number tripled between 1985 and 1997. This influx was mainly driven by mainland Chinese women convicted of prostitution, working without a proper visa, and drug trafficking. There was also a shortage of female staff to work with female prisoners. Infants up to nine months old could stay with their incarcerated mothers in special units, but then children up to six years old could stay with their mothers only once a week. Foreign prisoners complained about problems with the language barrier and racial discrimination by the guards.

In 1999, there were 10,358 prisoners and detainees in Hong Kong prisons, an occupancy rate of 114.5%; in 2003, there were 11,682 prisoners and detainees, an occupancy rate of 122.6%. Only in 2008 did the situation return to normal: 9,343 prisoners and detainees were held in institutions, with an occupancy rate of 96.7%. Despite this, there was an acute shortage of places in maximum-security male and female correctional institutions and in detention blocks. After the Asian financial crisis, the government reduced the staff of the department from 1999 to 2008 by more than a thousand people. By Spring, 2009, the staff-to-prisoner ratio was close to one in three, a heavy workload for the department's employees.

In 1998, Hong Kong's correctional facilities held 2,363 illegal immigrants and 1,386 foreigners, representing 31.5% of the total number of prisoners; in 2004, 1,488 illegal immigrants and 1,262 foreigners (21.6% of the total number of prisoners); in 2008, 967 illegal immigrants and 1,447 foreigners (23% of the total number of prisoners). In part, the reduction of foreigners in Hong Kong's prisons was due to their deportation to continue serving their sentences at home.

Among the serious criminals sentenced to long terms, a significant proportion have been drug traffickers. Many are from mainland China and other countries; to work with them, the department's officers study the Punjabi, Urdu, Nepali, Vietnamese, Filipino and Indonesian languages. Among serious disciplinary violations, the most common are: gambling; fights between prisoners,; smuggling of drugs, banknotes and mobile phones; assaults on department employees; escape attempts. Homicides and suicides are rare in Hong Kong prisons, although suicide attempts occur fairly regularly. Most of the correctional institutions have been operating for more than 35 years and need to be updated and expanded; some institutions have been repurposed from buildings that were not adapted for places of detention at all.

To prevent the smuggling of drugs and other prohibited items hidden in the body, rather than using manual rectal search, X-ray scanners with low radiation levels have been installed in some institutions. Many institutions were already equipped with the latest video surveillance systems for detecting such objects, electronic lock systems and motion sensors, and laboratories to test for drugs in blood and urine.

== Human rights critique ==
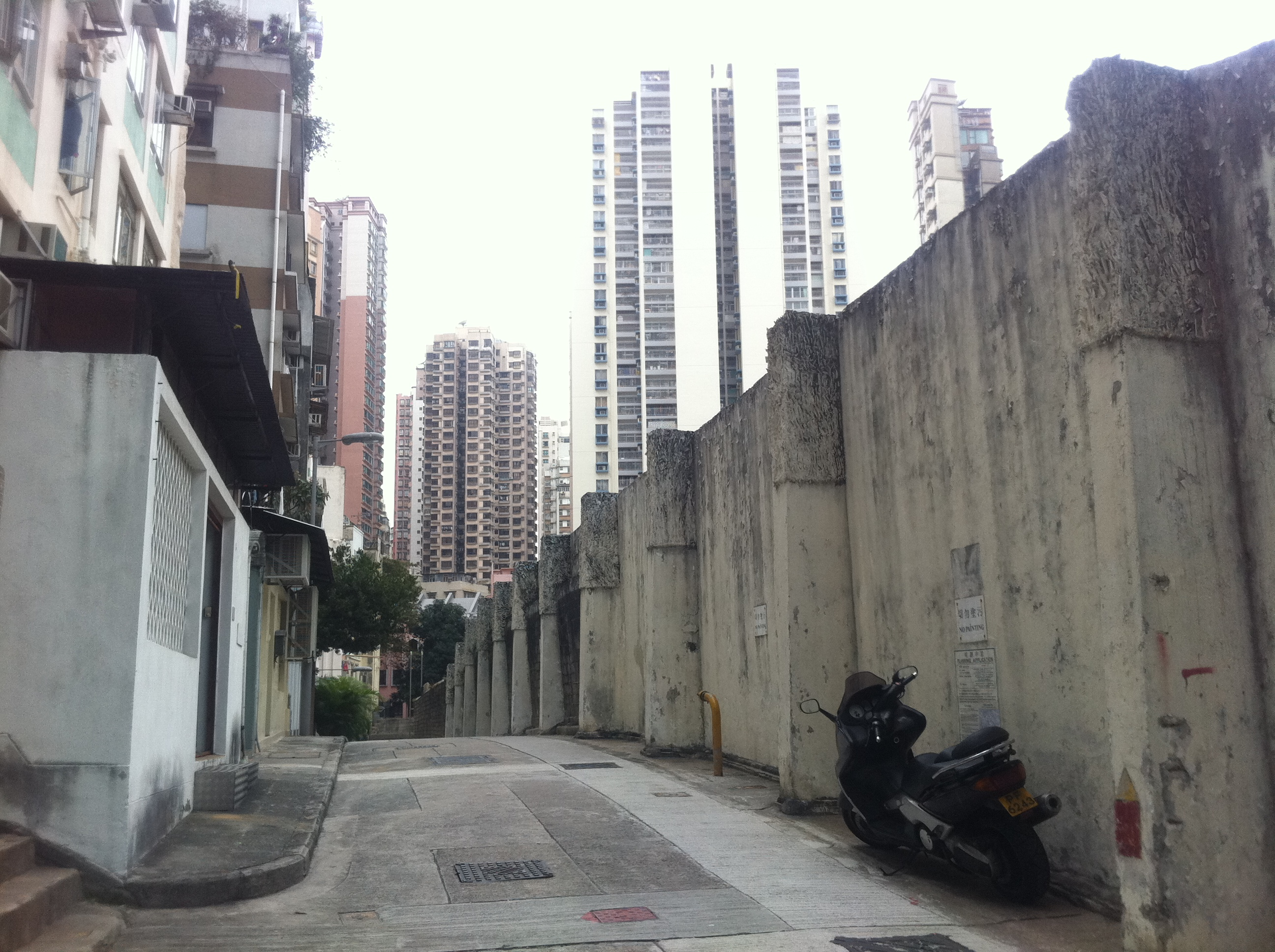
Exterior wall of Victoria Prison

In the early colonial period of Hong Kong's history, torture, beatings with canes and whips, and starvation were widely used in local prisons. Often, criminals were exposed by hanging wooden signs around their necks with a description of what they had done. The labor of prisoners was widely used in the heavy work of building roads, draining swamps, and quarrying stone. By the early 1970s, Hong Kong's prisons were effectively outside the control of the authorities, with violence, drug trafficking, gambling, and security corruption rampant, frequent prison riots and disturbances, and various triad groups being the real force.

=== Vietnamese refugees ===
The Vietnamese refugee camps that existed in Hong Kong from the 1970s to the 1990s were harshly criticized on human rights grounds. Thousands of people huddled in overcrowded tents, barracks and sheds without basic facilities. The camps lacked electricity and toilets, there were frequent outbreaks of cholera, interruptions in drinking water, medicines and garbage collection, rape, looting, drug trafficking and fights between refugee groups, murders and attacks on police officers. The food in the camps was much worse than in correctional facilities in Hong Kong. Food was distributed through barracks leaders (often the strongest and most violent men), chosen by the refugees themselves.

The mutually hostile natives of North and of South Vietnam were kept in separate camps. The refugees complained that the barracks were hot in summer and leaky during the rainy season, lacking hot water in winter, poorly provided with food and medicines, and that male guards saw women's showers from their towers; that the administration was very slow to make repairs; that the sanitary areas (washbasins, showers, toilets and laundries) were in very poor condition; that only a few of children and adolescents received schooling; and that people with infectious diseases (upper respiratory tract infections, gastroenteritis, skin diseases) were not separated from the bulk of the refugees. In Victoria Prison, Vietnamese refugees were kept in dark, damp basements and dimly lit, stuffy cells without toilets (those sent there, typically for a few months only, were mostly violators of discipline and fugitives).

=== Facilities ===
According to Human Rights Watch, the Hong Kong prison system was overcrowded in the second half of the 1990s, especially the pre-trial detention units. In March 1997, 22 institutions with a capacity of 10,400 were holding 12,300 people. There were inadequate medical services, poor sanitary conditions (especially acute was the problem of toilets and drinking water), serious under-staffing, a lack of proper independent monitoring of human rights. Facilities were inspected in the presence of administrators, and prisoners could not communicate with the inspectors in confidence. Many prisoners from mainland China were not eligible for alternative detention regimes available to local prisoners, for drug treatment, or for training programs. Under pressure from human rights defenders, amendments adopted in May 1997 somewhat relaxed the restrictions imposed on prisoners, especially as to their communication with the outside world.

Despite prison overcrowding, a high percentage of drug addicts and triad members, and a shortage of staff (especially on night shifts), Human Rights Watch found that as of 1997, Hong Kong's penitentiary facilities were under the full control of the department, with a low level of prison violence and abuse of prisoners by guards, and the department applied effective and adequate measures in response to discipline violations. However, according to human rights activists, staff of some prisons overemphasized strict discipline and total control over prisoners, which negatively affected them psychologically It was also quite difficult for the prisoners to challenge disciplinary punishment and regain the right to early release. Some prisoners who complained to justices of the peace and ombudsman, were segregated or transferred to higher-security institutions. Among the unsanctioned punishments, prisoners were more likely to complain of verbal abuse than of beatings.

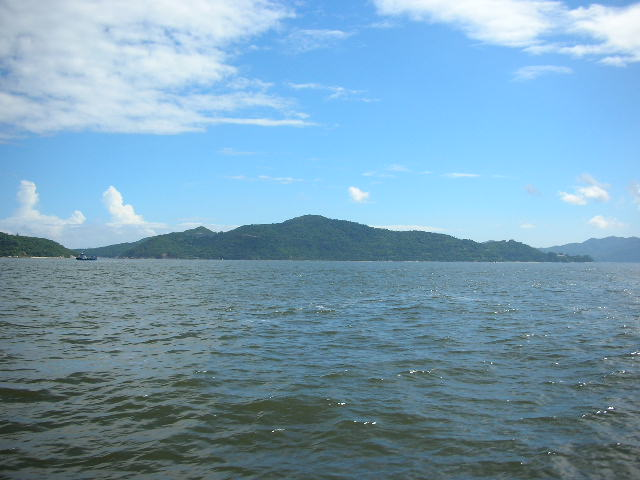
Hei Ling Chau Island

=== Visiting ===
The system for relatives and friends to visit prisoners was also criticized. Especially many complaints concerned limited-time visits at remote institutions requiring long travel times (for example to Hei Ling Chau Island, where more than 1,700 people were held in three institutions, two hours at sea for a half-hour meeting, not counting the trip to Hong Kong Island, from where the ferries departed). During so-called "closed" visits, the prisoner and his guests were separated by glass, with communication via a telephone (as a rule, "closed" visits were assigned to "difficult" prisoners who were dangerous, or those suspected of being involved in drug smuggling into the prison). During an "open " visit, the prisoner had direct contact with the visitors, and handshakes were allowed, but kissing was prohibited (sexual contact between the spouses was always strictly prohibited). In the visiting rooms, the prisoners were on one side of the long table, and their visitors on the other.

Recognizing that "closed" visits negatively affected the social ties of prisoners, the authorities launched a program of "open" visits for long-term prisoners in Shek Pik Prison (the pilot project was extended only to those who had not had disciplinary punishments in the last 12 months, and who were not found to have used drugs in custody). About a quarter of all Hong Kong prisoners were not visited at all (mostly foreigners or prisoners with whom their families and friends had broken off relations). For such people, visits were organized by volunteers from the Association of Friends of Prisoners (PFA), to interact with criminals as "pen pals". Since the volunteers were allowed to visit only those prisoners who had no other external contacts, if the prisoner was visited just once by one relative, communication with the volunteer was interrupted.

=== Censorship ===
The prison authorities had the right to censor prisoners' correspondence and often prohibited the sending of letters containing complaints about prison staff or conditions. In Hong Kong prisons, prisoners do not have access to phones and can only make a call through a request to the administration. The requirements for banned literature and the press (for example, describing sexual scenes, scenes of violence, methods of manufacturing weapons, explosives and drugs, radical political views) were also quite vague. Some institutions, on security grounds, did not accept hardcover books or newspapers that published the results of horse races, and some banned medical or legal books. Not all institutions adhered to the rule about the mandatory hour of walking for prisoners held in cells; due to overcrowding, walks were often reduced to 30–40 minutes.
