= Prisons in Hong Kong =

Prisons in Hong Kong are correctional facilities in Hong Kong, which are managed by the Correctional Services Department. Facilities have different purposes.

== Description ==
Prisons in Hong Kong comprise correctional facilities in Hong Kong, a city and special administrative region of China. They are managed by the Correctional Services Department. Facilities have different purposes, including training centres, detention centres, rehabilitation centres, and drug addiction treatment centres.

== Imprisonment rates ==
Hong Kong has one of the highest rates of imprisonment in the region at around 163 per 100,000. Imprisonment rates have declined from levels above 200 per 100,000 during 1991-1996 due to fluctuations in the numbers of illegal immigrants.

== List of prisons ==
This is a list of prisons in Hong Kong are managed (or previously managed) by the Correctional Services Department.

=== Hong Kong Island ===
- Cape Collinson Correctional Institution, Cape Collinson, Hong Kong Island
  (Male young offenders undergoing training under the Training Centres Ordinance)
- Chi Lan Rehabilitation Centre, Shek O, Hong Kong Island
  (Female young offenders undergoing Phase I training under the Rehabilitation Centres Ordinance)
- Ma Hang Prison, Ma Hang, Hong Kong Island
  (Male adult prisoners and clinically old prisoners of low security risk)
- Pak Sha Wan Correctional Institution, Stanley, Hong Kong Island
  (Male adult prisoners)
- Stanley Prison, Stanley, Hong Kong Island
  (Male adult convicted prisoners and male adult remand prisoners)
- Tung Tau Correctional Institution, Stanley, Hong Kong Island
  (Male adult prisoners of low security risk)
- Queen Mary Hospital Custodial Ward, Hong Kong Island
  (Male inmates who are suffering from illness and referred out by the Medical Officers of various penal institutions)
- Green Island Reception Centre, Green Island
  (Currently closed)
- Tai Tam Gap Correctional Institution, Tai Tam, Hong Kong Island
  (Currently closed)
- Victoria Prison, Central, Hong Kong Island
  (Closed Permanently in 2006. Now redeveloped into a cultural and shopping destination generally called Tai Kwun )

=== Kowloon ===
- Lai Chi Kok Reception Centre, Lai Chi Kok, New Kowloon
  (Male adult persons who are: (a) prisoner on remand in any category; (b) judgement respited prisoners; (c) detainees under the provisions of the Immigration Ordinance; (d) civil debtors; (e) appellants (except under life sentence); (f) Star and Ordinary Class adult prisoners (except under life sentence); or (g) persons remanded under the Drug Addiction Treatment Centres Ordinance)
- Lai Hang Rehabilitation Centre, Tai Wo Ping, New Kowloon
  (Male young offenders who completed Phase I training in Lai Chi Rehabilitation Centre under the Rehabilitation Centres Ordinance)
- Phoenix House, Tai Wo Ping, New Kowloon
  (Young male inmates discharged from Detention Centre, Training Centre & Drug Addiction Treatment Centre)
- Pelican House, Tai Wo Ping, New Kowloon
  (Male adult inmates released under supervision from Drug Addiction Treatment Centre, and male adult inmates under the Release Under Supervision Scheme, Pre-Release Employment Scheme, Conditional Release Scheme, Post-Release Supervision of Prisoners Scheme)
- Queen Elizabeth Hospital Custodial Ward, Kowloon
  (Male and female inmates who are suffering from illness and referred out by the Medical Officers of various penal institutions)

=== New Territories ===
- Bauhinia House, Tai Lam Chung, New Territories
  (Female inmates released under supervision from Training Centre or Drug Addiction Treatment Centre, and female adult inmates released under supervision of Release Under Supervision Scheme, the Pre-Release Employment Scheme or the Post-Release Supervision of Prisoners Scheme)
- Chi Lan Rehabilitation Centre, New Territories
  (Female young offenders undergoing Phase I training under the Rehabilitation Centres Ordinance)
- Lai King Training Centre, Lai King, New Territories
  (Young female prisoners, remand prisoners, training Centre inmates, drug addiction treatment centre inmates)
- Lo Wu Correctional Institution, Lo Wu, New Territories
  (Female adult prisoners)
- Pik Uk Correctional Institution, Pik Uk, New Territories
  (Male young remands and male young prisoners)
- Pik Uk Prison, Pik Uk, New Territories
  (Male Star Class adult prisoners)
- Siu Lam Psychiatric Centre, Siu Lam, New Territories
  (Male and female prisoners in all categories (sentenced or on remand) and detainees who require psychiatric observation, treatment, assessment or special psychological care)
- Tai Lam Centre for Women, Tai Lam, New Territories
  (Adult female prisoners, remands and inmates)
- Tai Lam Correctional Institution, Tai Lam, New Territories
  (Male adult recidivists with short term or balance of sentence)
- Wai Lan Rehabilitation Centre, Tai Lam, New Territories
  (Female young offenders who completed Phase I training in Chi Lan Rehabilitation Centre under the Rehabilitation Centres Ordinance)

=== Lantau Island ===
- Sha Tsui Detention Centre, Shek Pik, Lantau Island, New Territories
  (Young male offenders)
- Shek Pik Prison, Shek Pik, Lantau Island, New Territories
  (Adults serving medium to long-term sentences, including life imprisonment)
- Tong Fuk Correctional Institution, Lantau Island, New Territories
  (Male adult prisoners)
- Chi Sun Correctional Institution (Chi Ma Wan Drug Addiction Treatment Centre), Chi Ma Wan, Lantau Island, New Territories
  (Currently closed)
- Chi Ma Wan Correctional Institution, Chi Ma Wan, Lantau Island, New Territories
  (Currently closed)

=== Hei Ling Chau ===
- Hei Ling Chau Correctional Institution, Hei Ling Chau, New Territories
- Hei Ling Chau Addiction Treatment Centre, Hei Ling Chau, New Territories
- Lai Sun Correctional Institution, Hei Ling Chau, New Territories
- Nei Kwu Correctional Institution, Hei Ling Chau
