= Lai Chi Kok Reception Centre =

Prison in Lai Chi Kok, Kowloon, Hong Kong

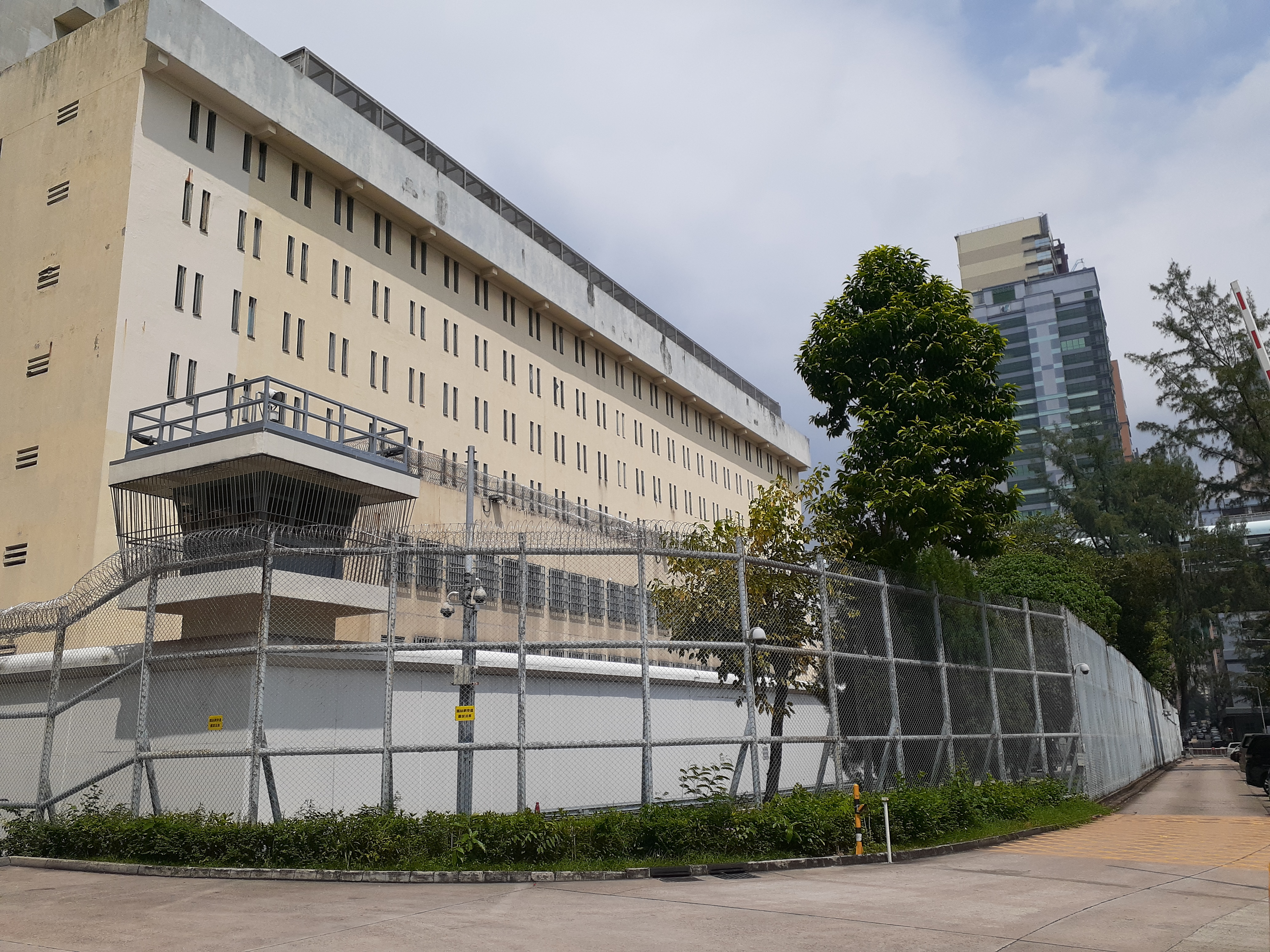
- Exterior view

- Location within Hong Kong
- Location: 3/5 Butterfly Valley Road Lai Chi Kok, Kowloon, Hong Kong; 22.3378°N 114.14359°E
- Status: Operational
- Security class: Maximum security
- Capacity: 1,484
- Opened: 1977; 49 years ago
- Managed by: Correctional Services Department
- Director: Leung Kin-ip, Chief Superintendent

Lai Chi Kok Reception Centre (Chinese: 荔枝角收押所) is a prison in Lai Chi Kok, Kowloon, Hong Kong. It is operated by the Correctional Services Department and is one of the largest prisons in the territory.

== History ==
The Lai Chi Kok Reception Centre was built to relieve overcrowding at the Victoria Remand Centre. Site formation work began in 1974.

On 21 November 1977, the HK$32-million prison was handed over from the Public Works Department to the Prisons Department (renamed Correctional Services Department in 1982). It began operating in December 1977.

In September 1997, Lai Chi Kok Reception Centre had a certified capacity of 960 but was overcrowded, housing a population of 1,293 at that time.

Secretary for Security Ambrose Lee formally opened the Lai Chi Kok Correctional Institution, located adjacent to Lai Chi Kok Reception Centre, on 20 July 2006. The medium-security facility had a capacity of 650 places for adult women prisoners. It closed in August 2010 after the inmates were relocated to the redeveloped Lo Wu Correctional Institution, and in 2011 it was merged into Lai Chi Kok Reception Centre to alleviate overcrowding, increasing the prison's capacity from 1,084 to 1,484.

== Description ==
The prison has a capacity of 1,484. It houses male adult remand prisoners and male detainees of other categories.

== Access ==
The prison is a 300-metre walk from Exit C of Lai Chi Kok station of the Mass Transit Railway (MTR). It is also served by numerous bus routes plying Cheung Sha Wan Road.

== See also ==
- Prisons in Hong Kong
