= Nadeem Razaq =

Hong Kong murderer

- Born: Pakistan
- Died: 3 November 2016; North Lantau Hospital, Hong Kong
- Conviction: Murder (3 counts)
- Penalty: Life imprisonment

Details
- Victims: 3
- Country: Hong Kong
- Date apprehended: 2008; 18 years ago

Nadeem Razaq (died 2016) was a Hong Kong resident of Pakistani origin who was convicted of the March 2008 murders of three prostitutes in Hong Kong.

== Biography ==
Razaq was born in Pakistan, and came to Hong Kong at a young age. He was one of five siblings and spoke fluent Cantonese. After his father died, he lived with his mother and elder brother in Tai Po. He had married two years prior to the crimes, but when his wife was seven months pregnant, he left home after accumulating gambling debts and repeatedly asked his family for money to repay them. He was unemployed at the time of his crime.

On 3 November 2016, Razaq died from suicide by hanging in Shek Pik Prison on Lantau Island.

== Murders and trial ==
Razaq initially began robbing sex workers, motivated by money and sexual gratification, but after killing CoCo in Yuen Long by strangulation, he reportedly experienced a sense of pleasure and began committing murders. He was arrested in Macau on 18 March 2008, just days after the murders.

At the trial, he stated that he was beaten by Macau police while in their custody. Razaq initially confessed to the murders, claiming he had committed them on the instruction of Macau loan sharks to whom he owed money; however, he later withdrew this confession. He came before Judge Clare-Marie Beeson of the High Court of Hong Kong, and pleaded not guilty to the murders; a seven-member jury found him guilty in July 2009, and Beeson sentenced him to life imprisonment.

== Victims ==
- Sze Ming-lan "CoCo", 35, found in Tung Lok Street, Yuen Long on 15 March 2008
- Sun Xiu-min "Salsa", 30, found in Tai Po at 10:15 PM on 16 March 2008
- Tse Hau-yuen "Qi-qi", 35, found at number 80 Kwong Fuk Road, Tai Po at 12:45 AM on 17 March 2008
