= Shek Pik Prison =

Prison on Lantau Island, Hong Kong

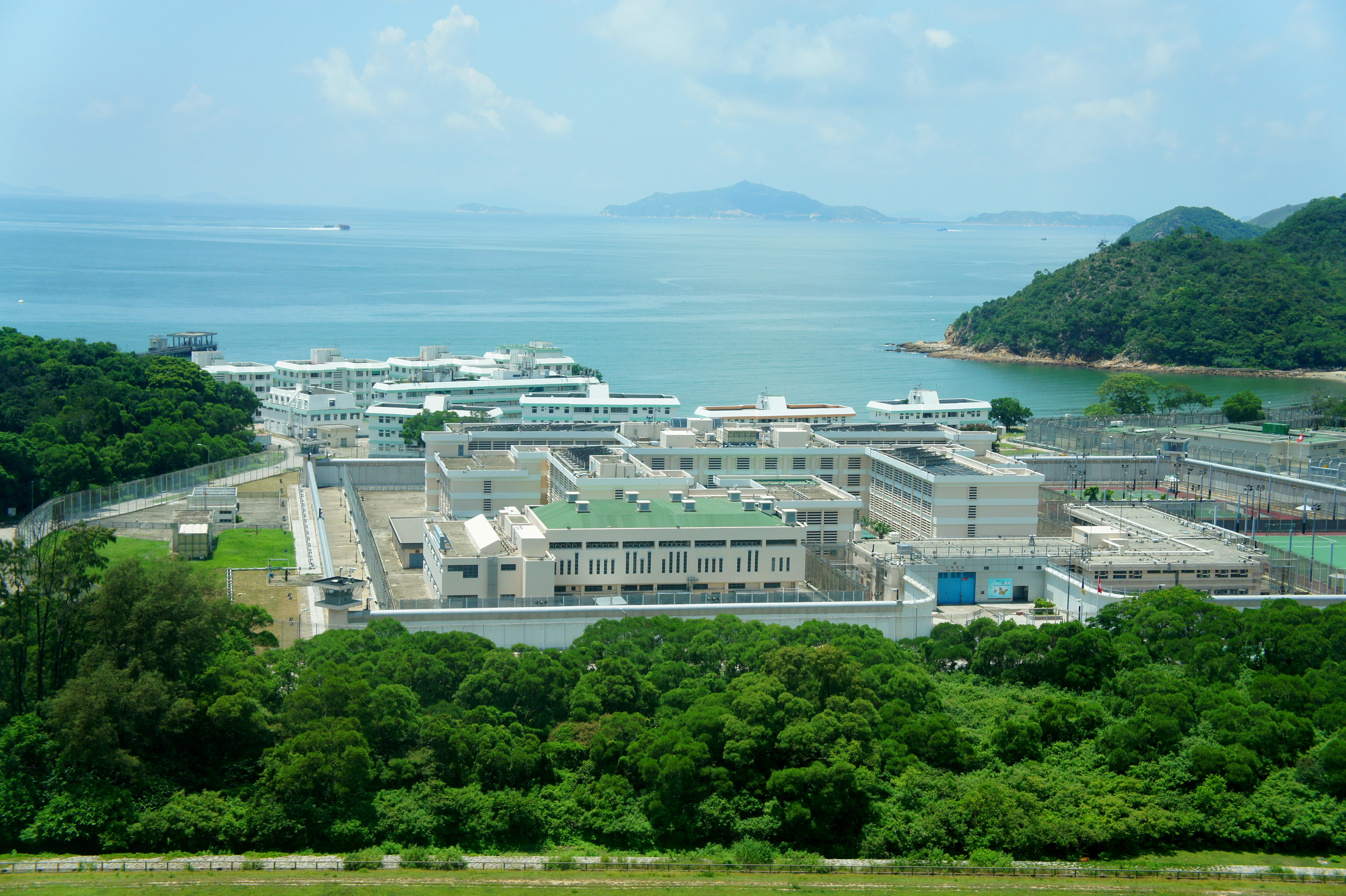
- Exterior view

- Location within Hong Kong
- Location: 47 Shek Pik Reservoir Road Lantau Island, Hong Kong; 22.2244°N 113.8949°E
- Status: Operational
- Security class: Maximum security
- Capacity: 426
- Opened: 1984
- Managed by: Correctional Services Department
- Director: Tse Kwok-wai, Senior Superintendent

Shek Pik Prison
- Traditional Chinese: 石壁監獄
- Simplified Chinese: 石壁监狱
- Cantonese Yale: sehk bīk gāam yuhk
Transcriptions
Standard Mandarin
- Hanyu Pinyin: Shí Bì Jiānyù
Yue: Cantonese
- Yale Romanization: sehk bīk gāam yuhk
- Jyutping: sek6 bik3 gaam1 juk6

Shek Pik Prison (Chinese: 石壁監獄) is a prison in Hong Kong, located at 47 Shek Pik Reservoir Road, Shek Pik, Lantau Island. It was built in 1984, and is managed by the Hong Kong Correctional Services. The prison is used to contain prisoners with medium to long sentences, as well as those sentenced to life imprisonment.

== History ==
Shek Pik Prison officially opened in 1984 as a maximum-security facility with a capacity of 466 prisoners, helping to relieve Stanley Prison. It cost approximately HK$135 million to construct. The prison was built with high-tech security features including a 160-camera video surveillance system and infrared perimeter alarm, as well as a solar energy water heating system, the government's largest such solar energy system at that time.

== Description ==
Located below the dam of the Shek Pik Reservoir, the prison remains a maximum-security institution. It now has an official capacity of 426.

As a well fortified prison, Shek Pik had advanced infrared perimeter alarm systems, wireless communication networks, and a closed-circuit television system worth over HK$4 million upon its initial operation, including over 160 surveillance cameras and 36 television monitors in the control room. The prison also had the second-largest solar energy system in Hong Kong at the time, covering an area of 480 square meters, primarily to provide hot water for the prison. Like other large correctional institutions, inmates are required to participate in "correctional industries" related work, and the prison has large-scale woodworking and laundry workshops, which are the largest among all correctional institutions in Hong Kong.

== Notable prisoners ==
- Lam Kor-wan – convicted serial killer
- Edward Leung – political activist
- Nadeem Razaq – convicted murderer, committed suicide on 3 November 2016
- Benny Tai – political activist
- Joshua Wong – political activist

== See also ==
- Prisons in Hong Kong
