= Hei Ling Chau Addiction Treatment Centre =

Drug rehabilitation centre in Hong Kong

- Location: Hei Ling Chau, Hong Kong
- Capacity: 672
- Opened: 1975; 51 years ago
- Managed by: Hong Kong Correctional Services
- Website: www.csd.gov.hk

The Hei Ling Chau Addiction Treatment Centre is a government-run drug rehabilitation centre located on the island of Hei Ling Chau in Hong Kong. The centre is operated by the Hong Kong Correctional Services Department and reserved for male detainees only. The current superintendent of the centre is Or Suen-wai, Timothy.

On 18 March 1994, the centre was granted the use of all structures on the island of Hei Ling Chau which were not already in use by the existing correctional centres by order of the Secretary for Security under the Drug Addiction Treatment Centre (Hei Ling Chau Addiction Treatment Centre) Order regulation.

The centre is part of the CSD's Compulsory Placement Programme, i.e. accepting detained persons convicted of offences under the Dangerous Drugs Ordinance. As part of the government's monitoring procedures, the centre receives fortnightly statutory visits from a Justice of the Peace. The visits, unannounced, are for the purpose of safeguarding the rights of inmates by receiving complaints and making comments or suggestions. In 2017, one complaint was received, no suggestion or comment was made and the JPs made no requests or enquiries of the institution.

== Social engagement ==
The Centre participates in educational programmes which aim to demonstrate the mechanisms of mandatory detention in Hong Kong, and issues involving substance abuse.

== Controversies ==
In 1997, a report published by Human Rights Watch cited the Hei Ling Chau Addiction Treatment Centre as being of a very low standard in terms of educational opportunities and resources available to its inmates.

In an article published in 2016, the Hei Ling Chau Addiction Treatment Centre was identified, among others, to be involved in a number of inmate abuse cases.
