= Lo Wu Correctional Institution =

Prison in Lo Wu, New Territories, Hong Kong

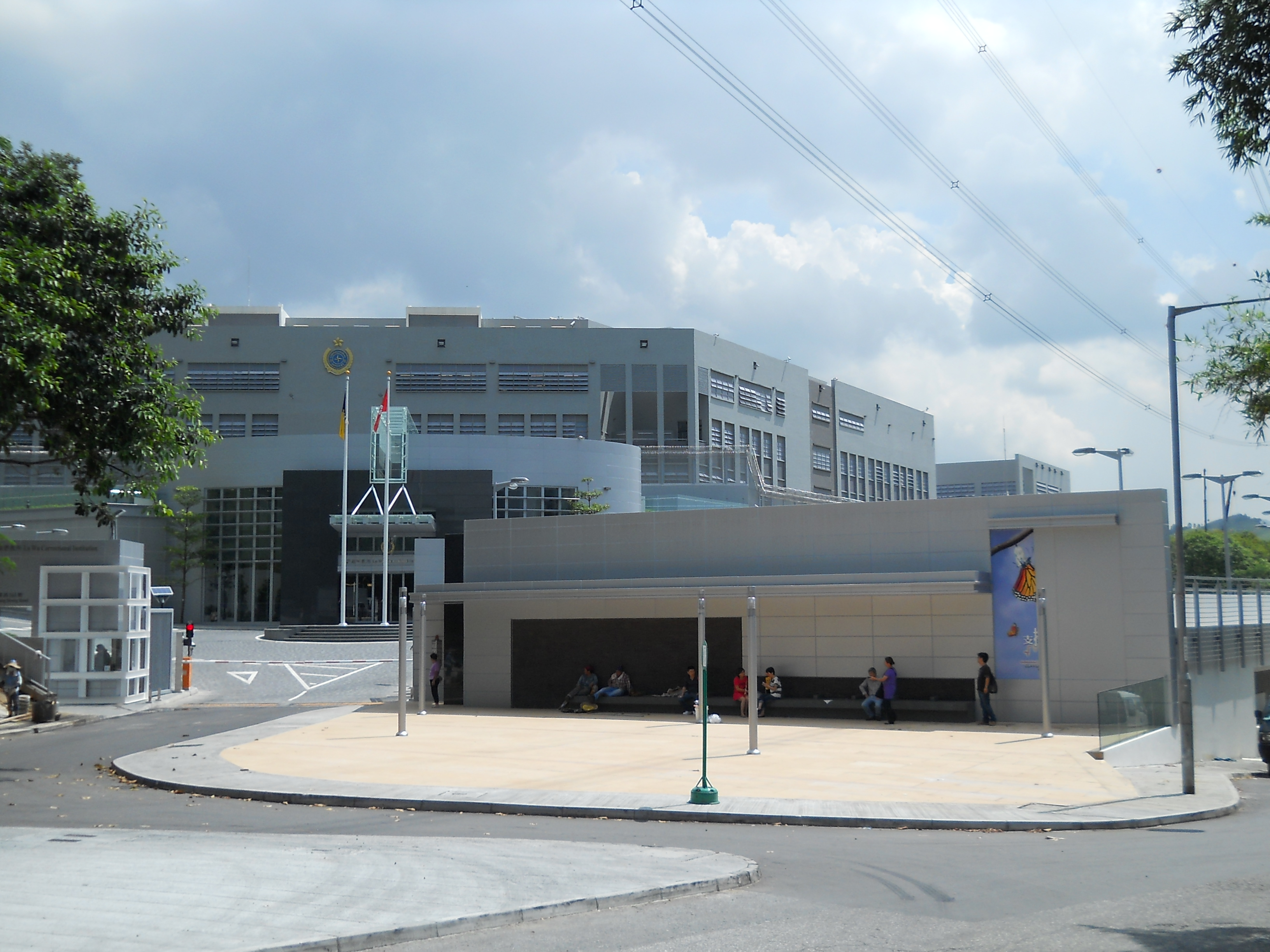
- Exterior view

- Location within Hong Kong
- Location: 163 Ho Sheung Heung Road Sheung Shui, New Territories; 22.5165°N 114.1110°E
- Status: Operational
- Security class: Medium security
- Capacity: 1,400
- Opened: August 1997; 28 years ago
- Managed by: Correctional Services Department
- Director: Tsung Chui-yee, Senior Superintendent

Lo Wu Correctional Institution (Chinese: 羅湖懲教所) is a medium-security prison in Lo Wu, New Territories, Hong Kong housing adult women prisoners and remands. It is the largest women's prison in Hong Kong.

== History ==
The site of the prison was formerly a British Forces base called Lo Wu Camp, which was later used to accommodate Vietnamese refugees. To help alleviate prison overcrowding, the military base was converted into the minimum-security Lo Wu Correctional Institution, which upon completion in August 1997 had a capacity of 208.

Overcrowding of the prison system remained a problem. Hence, the government developed plans to redevelop the Lo Wu Correctional Institution to provide a total of 1,400 penal places, an increase of nearly 1,200. In July 2006, the redevelopment plan was endorsed by the Finance Committee of the Legislative Council.

Work began in April 2007. Construction was carried out by contractor Yau Lee Group. The design-and-build contract was administered by the Architectural Services Department of the Hong Kong government. A topping-out ceremony was held on 11 August 2009.

The project was completed in April 2010. The new facility began operation on 2 July 2010, when the first 135 inmates arrived from Chi Ma Wan Correctional Institution, which was subsequently closed for redevelopment. Others came Lai Chi Kok Correctional Institution, which also closed and was later merged into Lai Chi Kok Reception Centre.

The chief executive of Hong Kong, Donald Tsang, formally opened the rebuilt Lo Wu Correctional Institution on 24 August 2010. The redevelopment project cost approximately HK$1.5 billion.

== Description ==
The prison has a capacity of 1,400. It houses adult women prisoners and remands. There are three wings. The minimum-security Main Wing has a capacity of 600. The medium-security East and West wings each provide 400 penal places.

Located in a rural area with no public sewer system, Lo Wu Correctional Institution was built with its own membrane bioreactor sewage treatment plant.

According to a 2020 news article, approximately 40 per cent of inmates were of non-Chinese ethnicity at that time.

== Notable inmates ==
- Agnes Chow – activist (until 31 December 2020)
- Cyd Ho – former lawmaker
- Yau Wai-ching – former lawmaker
- Tiffany Yuen – former district councillor

== See also ==
- Prisons in Hong Kong
