= Hei Ling Chau =

Island located east of Silver Mine Bay and Chi Ma Wan of Lantau Island

Coordinates: 22°15′9″N 114°2′25″E

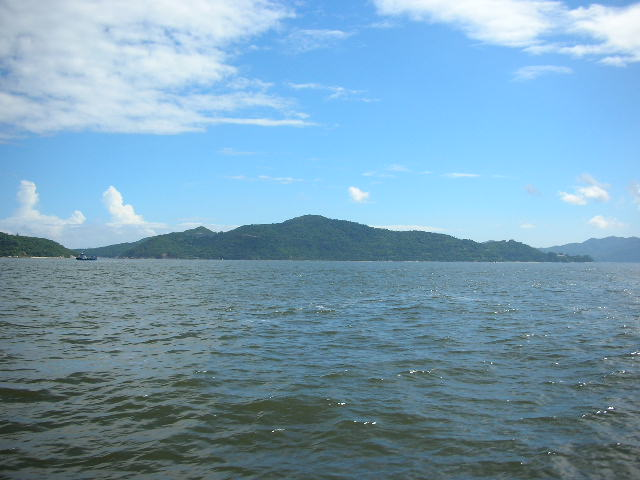
- Hei Ling Chau

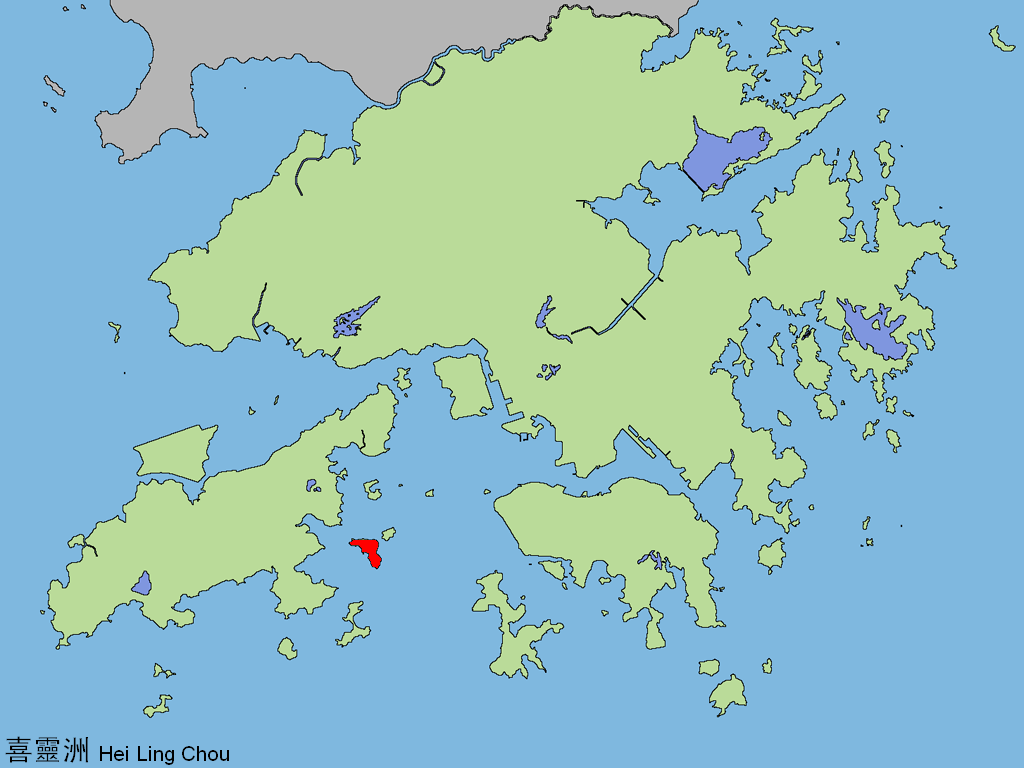

Geography
- Location: East of Lantau
- Area: 1.93 km^{2} (0.75 sq mi)
- Highest elevation: 187 m (614 ft)

Administration
- Hong Kong
- District: Islands District

Hei Ling Chau
- Traditional Chinese: 喜靈洲
- Simplified Chinese: 喜灵洲
- Literal meaning: Island of Happy Healing; Island of Joyful Soul
Transcriptions
Standard Mandarin
- Hanyu Pinyin: Xǐlíngzhōu
Yue: Cantonese
- Yale Romanization: Héi lìhng jāu
- Jyutping: Hei^{2} ling^{4} zau^{1}

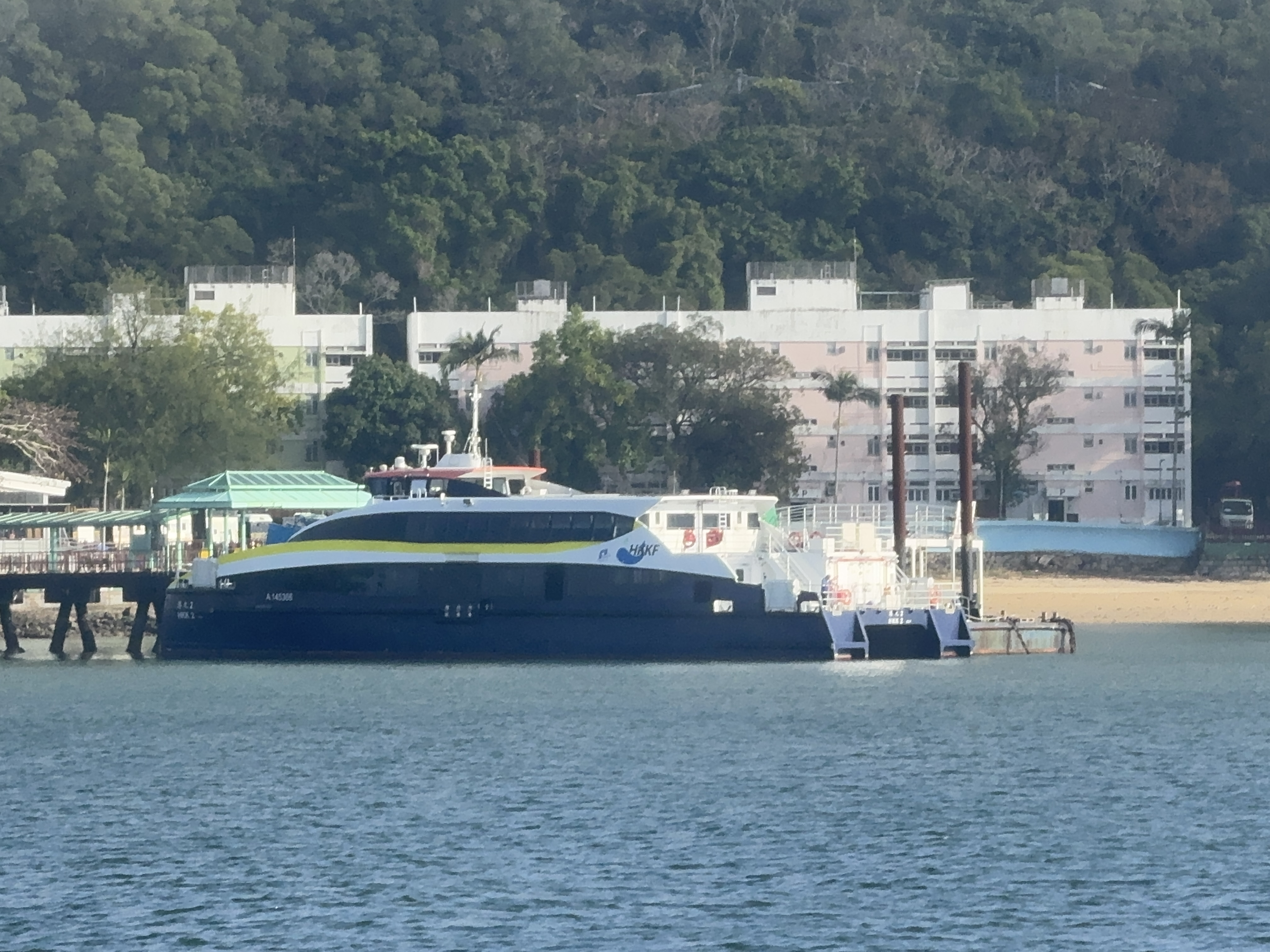
HKK 2 of Hong Kong & Kowloon Ferry at Hei Ling Chau Pier

Hei Ling Chau (Chinese: 喜靈洲), formerly Hayling Chau or Nai Gu Island, is an island of Hong Kong, located east of Silver Mine Bay and Chi Ma Wan of Lantau Island. Administratively, it is part of the Islands District.

== Geography ==
Hei Ling Chau is located south of Peng Chau and north of Cheung Chau. Its companion, Sunshine Island, is at its northeast. It has an area of 1.93 km^{2} (0.75 sq mi), and its highest hill is 187 m (614 ft). The island is L-shaped with its angle pointed northeast. The water southwest of the island is zoned as Hei Ling Chau Typhoon Shelter.

== History ==
The island was originally known as Nai Gu Island (尼姑洲). Settled at the end of the 19th century, it become home to about 100 people across 10 families by 1951. In 1950, it was designated as a leper colony, and the islanders were relocated to Tai Pak, Shap Long and Cheung Chau. In 1954, leprosarium was established through a collaboration between the Leprosy Mission London and the Hong Kong Government. The facility reach its peak in the early 1960s, housing as many as 540 patients. In 1974, the leper colony was closed, and the remaining patients were relocated to the newly established Lai Chi Kok Hospital. Following the closure of the colony, the island was repurposed by the Correctional Services Department.

In recognition of the island's new purpose, the island was renamed to Hei Ling Chau, which translates to "Island of Joyful Healing".

== Facilities ==
=== Rehabilitation ===
The Hei Ling Chau Addiction Treatment Centre occupies the north-western part of the island and students often get a chance to visit the island by joining preventive drug education programmes. The Centre Annex is located at the southeastern end of the Island.

=== Correctional services ===
The Hei Ling Chau Correctional Institute is located on the eastern part of the island. The Lai Sun Correctional Institution is located on the northern side of the island. The Lai Sun Correctional Institution is the first Vocational Training Centre operated by the Correctional Services Department which aims to train inmates to develop useful and market-oriented vocational skills before re-integrated into society.

=== Religious institutions ===
There are two Tin Hau Temples on the island. One was built in 1925 and was converted into a store room. The extant temple was built in 1985.

=== Proposed projects ===
In 2004, the Hong Kong Government proposed to spend HK$12 billion to build a super jail on the island. The proposal met strong opposition from the general public and experts alike, and was shelved indefinitely.

In 2006, CLP explored the possibility of constructing a second commercial wind turbine installation on Hei Ling Chau Island in order to promote the use of renewable energy in Hong Kong.

== Fauna ==
An endemic species, Dibamus bogadeki, commonly known as Bogadek's blind skink or Bogadek's legless lizard (Chinese: 鮑氏雙足蜥), was first discovered on the island by a Salesian priest and teacher, Father Anthony Bogadek, in whose honour the species is named. They live in soil or objects lying on the forest floor, the first live specimen discovered hiding under a mass of dead leaves and soil in a drain beside woodland. As a nocturnal and burrowing species it is practically blind and its eyes are covered by scales.

== Transport ==
The ferry service from Peng Chau, operated by Hong Kong & Kowloon Ferry, continues on to Hei Ling Chau for some sailings, however a permit is required to disembark. As of 2017, the fare for a single trip costs HK$17.5.

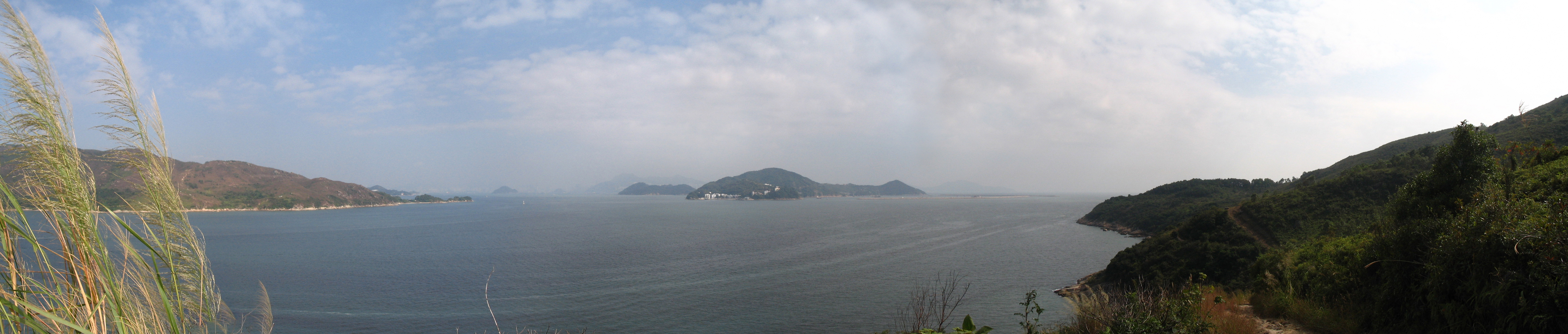
Overlooking Hei Ling Chau from the twelfth stretch of the Lantau Trail. Man Kok is on the left side of the picture. The right side is the hilly area between Mui Wo and Chi Ma Wan.

== See also ==
- List of islands and peninsulas of Hong Kong
- Outlying Islands
