= List of critically endangered reptiles =

- Extinct in the wild (EW): 2 species
- Critically endangered (CR): 432 species
- Endangered (EN): 800 species
- Vulnerable (VU): 627 species
- Near threatened (NT, LR/cd): 566 species
- Least concern (LC): 6,406 species
- Data deficient (DD): 1,502 species
Reptile species (IUCN, 2025.2)
- 10,368 extant species have been evaluated
- 8,866 of those are fully assessed (Note: excludes data deficient evaluations.)
- 6,972 are not threatened at present
- 1,894 to 3,396 are threatened (Note: Threatened comprises CR, EN and VU. Upper estimate additionally includes DD.)
- 34 to 84 are extinct or extinct in the wild:
  - 32 extinct (EX) species (Note: Chart omits extinct (EX) species)
  - 2 extinct in the wild (EW)
  - 50 possibly extinct [CR(PE)]
  - 0 possibly extinct in the wild [CR(PEW)]

Critically endangered (CR) species face an extremely high risk of extinction in the wild.

As of June 2026, the International Union for Conservation of Nature (IUCN) lists 432 critically endangered reptile species, including 50 which are tagged as possibly extinct. 4.2% of all evaluated reptile species are listed as critically endangered; 15 subspecies, and 11 subpopulations are also listed as critically endangered.

Additionally, 1,502 reptile species (14.5% of those evaluated) are listed as data deficient, meaning there is not sufficient information for a full assessment of conservation status. As these species typically have small distributions and/or populations, they are intrinsically likely to be threatened, according to the IUCN. While the category of data deficient indicates that no assessment of extinction risk has been made for the taxa, the IUCN notes that it may be appropriate to give them "the same degree of attention as threatened taxa, at least until their status can be assessed".

This is a complete list of critically endangered reptile species and subspecies evaluated by the IUCN. Species considered possibly extinct by the IUCN are marked as such. Species and subspecies which have critically endangered subpopulations (or stocks) are indicated.

== Turtles and tortoises ==
=== Chelidae ===
Austro‑South American side‑necked turtles

- Roti Island snake-necked turtle (Chelodina mccordi)
- Dahl's toad-headed turtle (Mesoclemmys dahli)
- Hoge's side-necked turtle (Ranacephala hogei)
- Western swamp turtle (Pseudemydura umbrina)

=== Pelomedusidae ===
African side‑necked turtles

- Seychelles yellow-bellied mud turtle (Pelusios castanoides ssp. intergularis)
- Seychelles black mud turtle (Pelusios subniger ssp. parietalis)

=== Podocnemididae ===
Malagasy‑South American side‑necked turtles

- Madagascar big-headed turtle (Erymnochelys madagascariensis)
- Magdalena River turtle (Podocnemis lewyana)

=== Trionychidae ===
Softshell turtles

- Black spiny softshell turtle (Apalone spinifera ssp. atra)
- Asian narrow-headed softshell turtle (Chitra chitra)
- Burmese narrow-headed softshell turtle (Chitra vandijki)
- Nubian flapshell turtle (Cyclanorbis elegans)
- Burmese peacock softshell (Nilssonia formosa)
- Leith's softshell turtle (Nilssonia leithii)
- Black softshell turtle (Nilssonia nigricans)
- Wattle-necked softshell turtle (Palea steindachneri)
- Asian giant softshell turtle (Pelochelys cantorii)
- Yangtze giant softshell turtle (Rafetus swinhoei)

=== Emydidae ===
Terrapins

- Bog turtle (Glyptemys muhlenbergii)

=== Platysternidae ===
Big‑headed turtle (single extant species)

- Big-headed turtle (Platysternon megacephalum)

=== Geoemydidae ===
Box turtles, pond turtles

- Southern river terrapin (Batagur affinis)
- Northern river terrapin (Batagur baska)
- Painted terrapin (Batagur borneoensis)
- Three-striped roof turtle (Batagur dhongoka)
- Red-crowned roofed turtle (Batagur kachuga)
- Burmese roofed turtle (Batagur trivittata)
- Yellow-headed box turtle (Cuora aurocapitata)
- Bourret's box turtle (Cuora bourreti)
- Indochinese box turtle (Cuora galbinifrons)
- McCord's box turtle (Cuora mccordi)
- Pan's box turtle (Cuora pani)
- Southern Vietnamese box turtle (Cuora picturata)
- Golden coin turtle (Cuora trifasciata)
- Yunnan box turtle (Cuora yunnanensis)
- Zhou's box turtle (Cuora zhoui)
- Yellow-headed temple turtle (Heosemys annandalii)
- Arakan forest turtle (Heosemys depressa)
- Giant Asian pond turtle (Heosemys grandis)
- Sulawesi forest turtle (Leucocephalon yuwonoi)
- Vietnamese pond turtle (Mauremys annamensis)
- Yellow pond turtle (Mauremys mutica)
- Chinese stripe-necked turtle (Mauremys sinensis)
- Malaysian giant turtle (Orlitia borneensis)
- Assam roofed turtle (Pangshura sylhetensis)
- Four-eyed turtle (Sacalia quadriocellata)
- Philippine forest turtle (Siebenrockiella leytensis)

=== Testudinidae ===
Tortoises

- Radiated tortoise (Astrochelys radiata)
- Angonoka tortoise (Astrochelys yniphora)
- Santiago giant tortoise (Chelonoidis darwini)
- Eastern Santa Cruz giant tortoise (Chelonoidis donfaustoi)
- Sierra Negra giant tortoise (Chelonoidis guntheri)
- Española giant tortoise (Chelonoidis hoodensis)
- Fernandina giant tortoise (Chelonoidis phantasticus)
- Western Santa Cruz giant tortoise (Chelonoidis porteri)
- Burmese star tortoise (Geochelone platynota)
- Desert tortoise (Gopherus agassizii)
- Bolson tortoise (Gopherus flavomarginatus)
- Gopher tortoise (Gopherus polyphemus)
- Elongated tortoise (Indotestudo elongata)
- Forsten's tortoise (Indotestudo forstenii)
- Home's hinge-back tortoise (Kinixys homeana)
- Pancake tortoise (Malacochersus tornieri)
- Asian forest tortoise (Manouria emys)
- Geometric tortoise (Psammobates geometricus)
- Spider tortoise (Pyxis arachnoides)
- Flat-backed spider tortoise (Pyxis planicauda)
- Egyptian tortoise (Testudo kleinmanni)

=== Cheloniidae ===
Sea turtles

- Hawksbill sea turtle (Eretmochelys imbricata)
- Kemp's ridley sea turtle (Lepidochelys kempii)
- Loggerhead sea turtle (Caretta caretta) (VU)
  - Northeast Indian Ocean subpopulation
  - Northwest Indian Ocean subpopulation
  - South Pacific Ocean subpopulation

=== Dermochelyidae ===
Leatherback sea turtle (single extant species)

- Leatherback sea turtle (Dermochelys coriacea) (VU)
  - East Pacific Ocean subpopulation
  - Southwest Atlantic Ocean subpopulation
  - Southwest Indian Ocean subpopulation
  - West Pacific Ocean subpopulation

=== Dermatemydidae ===
Hickatee (single extant species)

- Hickatee (Dermatemys mawii)

=== Kinosternidae ===
Mud turtles, musk turtles

- Vallarta mud turtle (Kinosternon vogti)
- Flattened musk turtle (Sternotherus depressus)

== Crocodilia ==
- Chinese alligator (Alligator sinensis)
- Orinoco crocodile (Crocodylus intermedius)
- Philippine crocodile (Crocodylus mindorensis)
- Cuban crocodile (Crocodylus rhombifer)
- Siamese crocodile (Crocodylus siamensis)
- Gharial (Gavialis gangeticus)
- Slender-snouted crocodile (Mecistops cataphractus)

== Lizards ==
=== Diplodactylidae ===
Diplodactylid geckos

- Sclerophyll bavayia (Bavayia exsuccida)
- Ornate bavayia (Bavayia ornata)
- Belep Island giant gecko (Correlophus belepensis)
- Key New Caledonian gecko (Dierogekko inexpectatus)
- Kaala striped gecko (Dierogekko kaalaensis)
- Koniambo striped gecko (Dierogekko koniambo)
- Poum striped gecko (Dierogekko poumensis)
- Taom striped gecko (Dierogekko thomaswhitei)
- Arcadia velvet gecko (Oedura lineata)
- Tough-snouted giant gecko (Rhacodactylus trachycephalus)

=== Carphodactylidae ===
Southern padless geckos

- Oakview leaf-tailed gecko
- Pinnacles leaf-tailed gecko

=== Eublepharidae ===
Eublepharid geckos

- Goniurosaurus huuliensis
- Toyama's ground gecko (Goniurosaurus toyamai)
- Yamashina's ground gecko (Goniurosaurus yamashinae)
- Yingde leopard gecko (Goniurosaurus yingdeensis)

=== Sphaerodactylidae ===
Sphaerodactylid geckos

- Reyes's Caribbean gecko (Aristelliger reyesi)
- Union Island gecko (Gonatodes daudini)
- Gonatodes infernalis
- As Sareen semaphore gecko (Pristurus assareen)
- Callous least gecko (Sphaerodactylus callocricus)
- Cochran's least gecko (Sphaerodactylus cochranae)
- Marche Leon least gecko (Sphaerodactylus elasmorhynchus)
- Hispaniolan tailspot sphaero (Sphaerodactylus epiurus)
- Cap-Haiten least gecko (Sphaerodactylus lazelli)
- Morne Dubois least gecko (Sphaerodactylus nycteropus)
- Neiba agave sphaero (Sphaerodactylus schuberti)
- Terra-Nueve least gecko (Sphaerodactylus sommeri)
- Haitian striped sphaero (Sphaerodactylus williamsi)

=== Phyllodactylidae ===
Phyllodactylid geckos

- Emirati leaf-toed gecko (Asaccus caudivolvulus)
- Homonota rupicola
- Homonota taragui
- Barbados leaf-toed gecko (Phyllodactylus pulcher)
- Lima leaf-toed gecko (Phyllodactylus sentosus)
- Haiti leaf-toed gecko (Phyllodactylus sommeri)

=== Gekkonidae ===
Common geckos

- Giant bronze gecko (Ailuronyx trachygaster)
- Fergana even-fingered gecko (Alsophylax ferganensis)
- Southern even-fingered gecko (Alsophylax laevis)
- Tadjikistan even-fingered gecko (Alsophylax tadjikiensis)
- Adi's day gecko (Cnemaspis adii)
- Butewe's day gecko (Cnemaspis butewai)
- Godagedara's day gecko (Cnemaspis godagedarai)
- Gotaimbara's day gecko (Cnemaspis gotaimbarai)
- Hitihami's day gecko (Cnemaspis hitihamii)
- Cnemaspis ingerorum
- Kohukumbure's day gecko (Cnemaspis kohukumburai)
- Kottiyoor day gecko (Cnemaspis kottiyoorensis)
- Cnemaspis latha
- Cnemaspis menikay
- Cnemaspis minang
- Nandimithra’s day gecko (Cnemaspis nandimithrai)
- Nilgara day gecko (Cnemaspis nilgala)
- Fairy rock gecko (Cnemaspis paripari)
- Cnemaspis phillipsi
- Rajakaruna’s day gecko (Cnemaspis rajakarunai)
- Rammale day gecko (Cnemaspis rammalensis)
- Retigala day gecko (Cnemaspis retigalensis)
- Samanala day gecko (Cnemaspis samanalensis)
- Ferguson's day gecko (Cnemaspis scalpensis)
- Shevaroy dwarf gecko (Cnemaspis shevaroyensis)
- Temiah rock gecko (Cnemaspis temiah)
- Thackeray's dwarf gecko (Cnemaspis thackerayi)
- Rough-bellied day gecko (Cnemaspis tropidogaster)
- Belep Island giant gecko (Correlophus belepensis)
- Cyrtodactylus celatus
- Chamba bent-toed gecko (Cyrtodactylus chamba)
- Cyrtodactylus chanhomeae
- Gialai bent-toed gecko (Cyrtodactylus gialaiensis)
- Cyrtodactylus gordongekkoi
- Gua Kanthan bent-toed gecko (Cyrtodactylus guakanthanensis)
- Cyrtodactylus jaegeri
- Jarak Island bent-toed gecko (Cyrtodactylus jarakensis)
- Cyrtodactylus montanus
- Black eyed bent-toed gecko (Cyrtodactylus nigriocularis)
- Takou bent-toed gecko (Cyrtodactylus takouensis)
- Sam Roi Yot leaf-toed gecko (Dixonius kaweesaki)
- Lauhachinda’s cave gecko (Gekko lauhachindai)
- Bouvier's leaf-toed gecko (Hemidactylus bouvieri)
- Dragon tree half-toed gecko (Hemidactylus dracaenacolus)
- Kunda half-toed gecko (Hemidactylus kundaensis)
- Satara gecko (Hemidactylus sataraensis)
- Southern Ghats slender gecko (Hemiphyllodactylus aurantiacus)
- Hemiphyllodactylus kolliensis
- 'Eua forest gecko (Lepidodactylus euaensis)
- Yellow-eyed gecko (Lepidodactylus flaviocularis)
- Rotuma forest gecko (Lepidodactylus gardineri)
- Mortlock Islands scaly-toed gecko (Lepidodactylus oligoporus)
- Tuvalu forest gecko (Lepidodactylus tepukapili)
- Insular dwarf gecko (Lygodactylus insularis)
- Tsiafajavona dwarf gecko (Lygodactylus mirabilis)
- Turquoise dwarf gecko (Lygodactylus williamsi)
- Mount Francais leaf-toed gecko (Paroedura lohatsara)
- Manapany day gecko (Phelsuma inexpectata)
- Masohoala day gecko (Phelsuma masohoala)

=== Scincidae ===
Skinks

- Barbados skink (Alinea lanceolata) (possibly extinct)
- Lyon's snake-eyed skink (Austroablepharus barrylyoni)
- Madras spotted skink (Barkudia insularis)
- Arnhem Land Gorges skink (Bellatorias obiri)
- Caledoniscincus constellatus
- Marie-Galante skink (Capitellum mariagalantae) (possibly extinct)
- Lesser Martinique skink (Capitellum metallicum) (possibly extinct)
- Lesser Saint Croix skink (Capitellum parvicruzae) (possibly extinct)
- Ebner's cylindrical skink (Chalcides ebneri)
- Juan de Nova snake-eyed skink (Cryptoblepharus caudatus)
- Lancelin Island skink (Ctenotus lancelini)
- Gravel-downs ctenostus (Ctenotus serotinus)
- Kaputar rock skink (Egernia roomi)
- Mariana skink (Emoia slevini)
- Eremiascincus antoniorum
- Valhalla skink (Flexiseps valhallae) (possibly extinct)
- Bojer's skink (Gongylomorphus bojerii)
- Angel's five-toed skink (Lacertaspis lepesmei)
- Lampropholis elliotensis
- Deignan tree skink (Lankascincus deignani)
- Penang Island larut skink (Larutia penangensis)
- Ono-i-Lau ground skink (Leiolopisma alazon)
- Allan's lerista (Lerista allanae)
- Nevin's slider (Lerista nevinae)
- Storr's lerista (Lerista storri)
- Mount Cooper striped lerista (Lerista vittata)
- Kopéto smooth skink (Lioscincus vivae)
- Cochons skink (Mabuya cochonae)
- Désirade skink (Mabuya desiradae)
- Grande-Terre skink (Mabuya grandisterrae)
- Guadeloupe skink (Mabuya guadeloupae) (possibly extinct)
- Hispaniolan two-lined skink (Mabuya hispaniolae) (possibly extinct)
- Greater Martinique skink (Mabuya mabouya) (possibly extinct)
- Montserrat skink (Mabuya montserratae) (possibly extinct)
- Sakalava short-legged sand skink (Madascincus arenicola)
- Roatán skink (Marisora roatanae)
- Mount Kaala marble-throated skink (Marmorosphax kaala)
- Northern dwarf skink (Nannoscincus exos)
- Pindai dwarf skink (Nannoscincus hanchisteus)
- Nannoscincus koniambo
- Kopéto elf skink (Nannoscincus manautei)
- Rankin's dwarf skink (Nannoscincus rankini)
- Layard's nessia (Nessia layardi)
- Alborn skink (Oligosoma albornense)
- Awakopaka skink (Oligosoma awakopaka)
- Burgan skink (Oligosoma burganae)
- White-bellied skink (Oligosoma hoparatea)
- Speckled skink (Oligosoma infrapunctatum) (possibly extinct)
- Barrier skink (Oligosoma judgei)
- Sinbad skink (Oligosoma pikitanga)
- Kapitia skink (Oligosoma salmo)
- Horton's mabuya (Panopa croizati)
- Sakalava legless skink (Paracontias fasika)
- Antsiranana blind legless skink (Paracontias minimus)
- Rothschild's skink (Paracontias rothschildi)
- Parvoscincus tikbalangi
- Terror skink (Phoboscincus bocourti)
- Bermuda skink (Plestiodon longirostris)
- Slender limbless slider (Pseudoacontias menamainty)
- Durban dwarf burrowing skink (Scelotes inornatus)
- Scincella huanrenensis
- Red-tailed shiny skink (Sigaloseps ruficauda)
- Anegada skink (Spondylurus anegadae) (possibly extinct)
- Culebra skink (Spondylurus culebrae)
- Hispaniolan four-lined skink (Spondylurus haitiae) (possibly extinct)
- Hispanioalan ten-lined skink (Spondylurus lineolatus) (possibly extinct)
- Carrot Rock skink (Spondylurus macleani)
- Greater Saint Croix skink (Spondylurus magnacruzae) (possibly extinct)
- Saint Martin skink (Spondylurus martinae) (possibly extinct)
- Mona skink (Spondylurus monae)
- Monito skink (Spondylurus monitae) (possibly extinct)
- Lesser Virgin Islands skink (Spondylurus semitaeniatus)
- Virgin Islands bronze skink (Spondylurus sloanii)
- Greater Virgin Islands skink (Spondylurus spilonotus) (possibly extinct)
- Turks Islands skink (Spondylurus turksae)
- Trachylepis nganghae

=== Alopoglossidae ===
Alopoglossus lizards

- Daniel's largescale lizard (Alopoglossus danieli)

=== Gymnophthalmidae ===
Spectacled lizards

- Bachia psamophila
- Euspondylus monsfumus
- Oreosaurus rhodogaster

=== Teiidae ===
Racerunners, tegus

- Saint Lucia whiptail (Cnemidophorus vanzoi)
- Peters' ameiva (Holcosus orcesi)
- Redonda ground lizard (Pholidoscelis atratus)
- Sombrero ameiva (Pholidoscelis corvinus)

=== Lacertidae ===
Wall lizards

- Be'er Sheva fringe-fingered lizard (Acanthodactylus beershebensis)
- Harran fringe-toed lizard (Acanthodactylus harranensis)
- Charnali lizard (Darevskia dryada)
- Transcaucasian desert runner (Eremias pleskei)
- Gran Canaria giant lizard (Gallotia stehlini)

=== Amphisbaenidae ===
Worm lizards

- Cayemite short-tailed amphisbaena (Amphisbaena cayemite)
- Gonave worm lizard (Amphisbaena gonavensis)
- Pestel amphisbaena (Amphisbaena leali)
- Cobra-de-duas-cabeças (Amphisbaena sanctaeritae)
- Okoloma worm lizard (Cynisca gansi) (possibly extinct)
- Kigom Hills worm lizard (Cynisca kigomensis)

=== Varanidae ===
Monitor lizards and allies

- Mitchell's water monitor (Varanus mitchelli)

=== Diploglossidae ===
Galliwasps and Ophiodes sp. legless lizards

- Altagracia giant galliwasp (Caribicus anelpistus) (possibly extinct)
- Blue-tailed galliwasp (Celestus duquesneyi)
- Small-eyed galliwasp (Celestus microblepharis)
- Jamaican giant galliwasp (Celestus occiduus) (possibly extinct)
- Montserrat galliwasp (Diploglossus montisserrati)

=== Anguidae ===
Slowworms, glass lizards, and alligator lizards.

- Anzuetoi arboreal alligator lizard (Abronia anzuetoi)
- Campbell's alligator lizard (Abronia campbelli)
- Frost's arboreal alligator lizard (Abronia frosti)

=== Chamaeleonidae ===
Chameleons

- Namoroka leaf chameleon (Brookesia bonsi)
- Ambre Forest stub-tailed chameleon (Brookesia desperata)
- Bizarre-nosed chameleon (Calumma hafahafa)
- Belalanda chameleon (Furcifer belalandaensis)
- Kinyongia mulyai
- Nguru spiny pygmy chameleon (Rhampholeon acuminatus)
- Mount Inago pygmy chameleon (Rhampholeon bruessoworum)
- Chapman's pygmy chameleon (Rhampholeon chapmanorum) (possibly extinct)
- Rhampholeon hattinghi

=== Agamidae ===
Dragon lizards

- Morningside lizard (Calotes desilvai)
- Erdelen's horned lizard (Ceratophora erdeleni)
- Karu's horned lizard (Ceratophora karu)
- Dumbara agama (Cophotis dumbara)
- Bami toad-headed agama (Phrynocephalus golubewii)
- Phrynocephalus horvathi
- Malaya false bloodsucker (Pseudocalotes flavigula)
- Rhaegal's false garden lizard (Pseudocalotes rhaegal)
- Superb large fan-throated lizard (Sarada superba)
- Dark sitana (Sitana fusca)
- Canberra grassland earless dragon (Tympanocryptis lineata)
- Bathurst grassland earless dragon (Tympanocryptis mccartneyi)
- Victorian grassland earless dragon (Tympanocryptis pinguicolla)

=== Leiocephalidae ===
Curly-tailed lizards

- Alto Velo curlytail lizard (Leiocephalus altavelensis)
- Central Haitian curlytail (Leiocephalus endomychus)
- Sierra curlytail lizard (Leiocephalus onaneyi)
- Atalaye curlytail lizard (Leiocephalus pratensis)
- Lapierre curlytail lizard (Leiocephalus rhutidira)

=== Iguanidae ===
Iguanas and chuckwallas

- Fiji crested iguana (Brachylophus vitiensis)
- Galápagos pink land iguana (Conolophus marthae)
- Black-chested spiny-tailed iguana (Ctenosaura melanosterna) (EN)
  - Valle de Aguán subpopulation
  - Cayos Cochinos subpopulation
- Utila spiny-tailed iguana (Ctenosaura bakeri)
- Oaxaca spiny-tailed iguana (Ctenosaura oaxacana)
- Jamaican iguana (Cyclura collei)
- Exuma rock iguana (Cyclura cychlura ssp. figginsi)
- Sister Isles rock iguana (Cyclura nubila ssp. caymanensis)
- Anegada rock iguana (Cyclura pinguis)
- White Cay rock iguana (Cyclura rileyi ssp. cristata)
- Watling Island ground iguana (Cyclura rileyi ssp. rileyi)
- Mona rhinoceros iguana (Cyclura stejnegeri)
- Lesser Antillean iguana (Iguana delicatissima)

=== Tropiduridae ===
Neotropical ground lizards

- Haensch's whorltail iguana (Stenocercus haenschi) (possibly extinct)

=== Phrynosomatidae ===
Phrynosomatid lizards

- Queretaran desert lizard (Sceloporus exsul)
- Nayarit yellow belly bunchgrass lizard (Sceloporus mendezdelacruzi)

=== Dactyloidae (Anolidae) ===
Anoles

- Noble's anole (Anolis altavelensis)
- Anolis amplisquamosus
- Bay Islands anole (Anolis bicaorum)
- Anolis cusuco
- Darlington's anole (Anolis darlingtoni)
- Carrot Rock's anole (Anolis ernestwilliamsi)
- Eugene's anole (Anolis eugenegrahami)
- Brown red-bellied anole (Anolis koopmani)
- Anolis kreutzi
- Monteverde anole (Anolis monteverde)
- Anolis morazani
- Anolis muralla
- Nelson's anole (Anolis nelsoni)
- Redonda anole (Anolis nubilus)
- Finca Ceres anole (Anolis juangundlachi)
- Marmelade anole (Anolis rimarum)
- Culebra giant anole (Anolis roosevelti) (possibly extinct)
- Macaya green twig anole (Anolis singularis)
- Tenorio anole (Anolis tenorioensis)
- Mangrove anole (Anolis utilensis)
- Anolis vanzolinii
- Corn Island anole (Anolis villai)

=== Liolaemidae ===
Tree iguanas and allies

- Liolaemus aparicioi
- Liolaemus azarai
- Cranwell's tree iguana (Liolaemus cranwelli) (possibly extinct)
- Nuñez's tree iguana (Liolaemus curis)
- Liolaemus cuyumhue
- Lutz's tree iguana (Liolaemus lutzae)
- Liolaemus paulinae
- Rabino's tree iguana (Liolaemus rabinoi)

=== Leiosauridae ===
Leiosaurid iguanians

- Papa-vento-da-chapada (Enyalius erythroceneus)
- Casuhatien anole (Pristidactylus casuhatiensis)

== Snakes ==
=== Leptotyphlopidae ===
Thread snakes

- Samana threadsnake (Mitophis calypso)
- Haitian border threadsnake (Mitophis leptepileptus)
- Barbados threadsnake (Tetracheilostoma carlae)

=== Gerrhopilidae ===
Indo-Malayan blind snakes

- Jan's worm snake (Gerrhopilus mirus)

=== Typhlopidae ===
Common blind snakes

- Fassifern blind snake (Anilios insperatus)
- Cayman Brac blindsnake (Cubatyphlops epactius)
- Sri Lanka worm snake (Indotyphlops lankaensis)
- Hong Kong blind snake (Indotyphlops lazelli)
- Pied worm snake (Indotyphlops leucomelas)
- La Hotte blindsnake (Typhlops agoralionis)

=== Xenotyphlopidae ===
Madagascar blind snakes

- Typical Madagascar blind snake (Xenotyphlops grandidieri)

=== Tropidophiidae ===
Dwarf boas

- Navassa dwarf boa (Tropidophis bucculentus) (possibly extinct)
- Cayman Islands dwarf boa (Tropidophis caymanensis)
- Southern eyelash boa (Tropidophis gularis) (possibly extinct)
- Parker's dwarf boa (Tropidophis parkeri)
- Stull's dwarf boa (Tropidophis stullae)
- Schwartz's dwarf boa (Tropidophis schwartzi)

=== Boidae ===
Boas

- Conception Bank silver boa (Chilabothrus argentum)

=== Uropeltidae ===
Shield-tail snakes

- Eranga Viraj's shieldtail snake (Rhinophis erangaviraji)
- Gower's shieldtail snake (Rhinophis goweri)
- Phillipps' earth snake (Rhinophis phillipsi)
- Müller's earth snake (Rhinophis punctatus)
- Roshan Perera's shieldtail (Rhinophis roshanpererai)
- Shevaroy Hills earth snake (Uropeltis shorttii)

=== Cylindrophiidae ===
Asian pipesnakes

- Jampea Island pipe snake (Cylindrophis isolepis)

=== Viperidae ===
Vipers

- Matilda's horned viper (Atheris matildae)
- Golden lancehead (Bothrops insularis)
- Jararacuçu de Murici (Bothrops muriciensis)
- Jararaca-de-Vitória (Bothrops otavioi)
- Santa Catalina rattlesnake (Crotalus catalinensis)
- Wagner's viper (Montivipera wagneri)
- Island pit viper (Trimeresurus labialis)
- Anatolian meadow viper (Vipera anatolica)
- Darevsky's viper (Vipera darevskii)
- Mount Papai viper (Vipera orlovi)

=== Colubridae ===
Colubrids (including Natricinae, Dipsadinae, Calamariinae et al.)

- Antiguan racer (Alsophis antiguae)
- Antilles racer (Alsophis antillensis)
- Cobra-rainha estriada (Apostolepis striata)
- Sri Lanka rough-sided snake (Aspidura deraniyagalae)
- de Silva's rough-side snake (Aspidura desilvai)
- Ravana's rough-side snake (Aspidura ravanai)
- Atractus arangoi
- Atractus hoogmoedi
- Atractus multidentatus
- Saint Croix racer (Borikenophis sanctaecrucis) (possibly extinct)
- Apreocular reed snake (Calamaria apraeocularis)
- Tioman reed snake (Calamaria ingeri)
- Calamaria longirostris
- Prakke's reed snake (Calamaria prakkei) (possibly extinct)
- Saint Vincent blacksnake (Chironius vincenti)
- San Andres snake (Coniophanes andresensis)
- Swan Island racer (Cubophis brooksi)
- Hoshell's forest racer (Dendrophidion boshelli)
- Brazilian woodland racer (Drymoluber apurimacensis)
- Echinanthera cephalomaculata
- Miopic shadow snake (Emmochliophis miops)
- Guanaja long-tailed snake (Enulius bifoveatus)
- Lacépède's ground snake (Erythrolamprus cursor) (possibly extinct)
- Saint Lucia racer (Erythrolamprus ornatus)
- Honduran red-banded earth snake (Geophis damiani)
- Pulau Tioman ground snake (Gongylosoma mukutense)
- Jamaican racer (Hypsirhynchus ater) (possibly extinct)
- La Vega racer (Hypsirhynchus melanichnus) (possibly extinct)
- Parish's fanged snake (Ialtris parishi)
- Ross's wolf snake (Lycodon chrysoprateros)
- Clarion racer (Masticophis anthonyi)
- Boo-Liat's kukri snake (Oligodon booliati)
- Omoadiphas cannula (possibly extinct)
- Omoadiphas texiguatensis
- Kikuzato's brook snake (Opisthotropis kikuzatoi)
- Rhadinella tolpanorum
- Sibon merendonensis
- Braided shadow snake (Synophis plectovertebralis)
- Taeniophallus nebularis
- Mountain centipede snake (Tantilla insulamontana)
- Peters's black-headed snake (Tantilla petersi)
- Three-banded centipede snake (Tantilla tritaeniata)
- Viquez's tropical ground snake (Trimetopon viquezi) (possibly extinct)

=== Prosymnidae ===
Shovel-snout snakes (formerly of Lamprophiidae)

- Ornate shovel-snout (Prosymna ornatissima)

=== Pseudoxyrhophiidae ===
Pseudoxyrhophiids (formerly of Lamprophiidae)

- Andasibe big-headed snake (Compsophis vinckei)
- Ankafina ground snake (Pseudoxyrhopus ankafinaensis) (possibly extinct)

=== Elapidae ===
Coral snakes, cobras, and allies

- Nyanga rinkhals (Hemachatus nyangensis) (possibly extinct)
- Medem's coral snake (Micrurus medemi)
- Roatan coral snake (Micrurus ruatanus)

== See also ==
- Lists of IUCN Red List critically endangered species
- List of least concern reptiles
- List of near threatened reptiles
- List of vulnerable reptiles
- List of endangered reptiles
- List of recently extinct reptiles
- List of data deficient reptiles
