= List of recently extinct reptiles =

- Extinct in the wild (EW): 2 species
- Critically endangered (CR): 432 species
- Endangered (EN): 800 species
- Vulnerable (VU): 627 species
- Near threatened (NT, LR/cd): 566 species
- Least concern (LC): 6,406 species
- Data deficient (DD): 1,502 species
Reptile species (IUCN, 2025.2)
- 10,368 extant species have been evaluated
- 8,866 of those are fully assessed (Note: excludes data deficient evaluations.)
- 6,972 are not threatened at present
- 1,894 to 3,396 are threatened (Note: Threatened comprises CR, EN and VU. Upper estimate additionally includes DD.)
- 34 to 84 are extinct or extinct in the wild:
  - 32 extinct (EX) species (Note: Chart omits extinct (EX) species)
  - 2 extinct in the wild (EW)
  - 50 possibly extinct [CR(PE)]
  - 0 possibly extinct in the wild [CR(PEW)]

As of September 2016, the International Union for Conservation of Nature (IUCN) lists 24 extinct species, 17 possibly extinct species, and two extinct in the wild species of reptile.

== Turtles and tortoises ==
Extinct species

- Pinta giant tortoise (Chelonoidis abingdonii)
- Galápagos tortoise (Chelonoidis spp.) (4 of 15 known species extinct)
- Réunion giant tortoise (Cylindraspis indica)
- Saddle-backed Mauritius giant tortoise (Cylindraspis inepta)
- Domed Rodrigues giant tortoise (Cylindraspis peltastes)
- Domed Mauritius giant tortoise (Cylindraspis triserrata)
- Saddle-backed Rodrigues giant tortoise (Cylindraspis vosmaeri)

Extinct in the wild species

- Black softshell turtle (Nilssonia nigricans)

== Lizards ==
Extinct species

- Guadeloupe ameiva (Pholidoscelis cineraceus)
- Martinique giant ameiva (Ameiva major)
- Cape Verde giant skink (Chioninia coctei)
- Contomastix charrua
- Navassa rhinoceros iguana (Cyclura cornuta onchiopsis)
- Christmas Island forest skink (Emoia nativitatis)
- Delcourt's giant gecko (Gigarcanum delcourti)
- Navassa curly-tailed lizard (Leiocephalus eremitus)
- Martinique curly-tailed lizard (Leiocephalus herminieri)
- Mauritian giant skink (Leiolopisma mauritiana)
- Rodrigues giant day gecko (Phelsuma gigas)
- Tonga ground skink (Tachygyia microlepis)
- Eastwood's long-tailed seps (Tetradactylus eastwoodae)

Possibly extinct species

- Culebra Island giant anole (Anolis roosevelti)
- Lesser Saint Croix skink (Capitellum parvicruzae)
- San Cristobal galliwasp (Celestus anelpistus)
- Jamaica giant galliwasp (Celestus occiduus)
- Contomastix vittata
- Okoloma worm lizard (Cynisca gansi)
- La Palma giant lizard (Gallotia auaritae)
- Magdalena scaly-eyed gecko (Lepidoblepharis miyatai)
- Cranwell's tree iguana (Liolaemus cranwelli)
- Chapman's pygmy chameleon (Rhampholeon chapmanorum)
- Greater Saint Croix skink (Spondylurus magnacruzae)
- Monito skink (Spondylurus monitae)
- Greater Virgin Islands skink (Spondylurus spilonotus)
- Haensch's whorltail iguana (Stenocercus haenschi)

== Snakes ==
Extinct species

- Round Island burrowing boa (Bolyeria multocarinata)
- Barbados racer (Erythrolamprus perfuscus)
- Hoffstetter's worm snake (Madatyphlops cariei)

Possibly extinct species

- Saint Croix racer (Borikenophis sanctaecrucis)
- Brike Snake (Calamaria prakkei)
- Agalta Mountain forest snake (Omoadiphas cannula)
- Ankafina ground snake (Pseudoxyrhopus ankafinaensis)
- Viquez's tropical ground snake (Trimetopon viquezi)

== See also ==
- List of least concern reptiles
- List of near threatened reptiles
- List of vulnerable reptiles
- List of endangered reptiles
- List of critically endangered reptiles
- List of data deficient reptiles
