= Cnemaspis jackieii =

Scientific classification
- Kingdom: Animalia
- Phylum: Chordata
- Class: Reptilia
- Order: Squamata
- Suborder: Gekkota
- Family: Gekkonidae
- Genus: Cnemaspis
- Species: C. jackieii

Binomial name
- Cnemaspis jackieii Pal, Mirza, Dsouza & Shanker, 2021
- Cnemaspis jackieii is only known from the Vairavankulam Reserve Forest in the southern Western Ghats, India

Species of gecko

Cnemaspis jackieii is a species of diurnal gecko in the family Gekkonidae. It is endemic to the Western Ghats in southern India.

== Description ==
Cnemaspis jackieii is a small Cnemaspis gecko, measuring 31.1 mm from snout to vent. It has circular nostrils and small eyes with round black pupils surrounded by orange irises. It has a slender and elongated body, short forelimbs and long hindlimbs. The digits are also elongated and slender, and all have recurved claws. Males have 5–6 femoral pores on each thigh. The base of the tail is swollen and the tail itself is longer than the entire body.

The upper side of the body of a male C. jackieii is reddish, with six grey blotches down the back; the limbs are tinged with yellow. The tail has seven alternating bands of black and pale white. The underside of the body is yellow. The female has the upper side of the body coloured dull grey or brown, with the blotches coloured dark brown; the tail has alternate dark grey and buff-coloured bands.

== Evolution and taxonomy ==
Cnemaspis jackieii is a member of the clade gracilis within the genus Cnemaspis, along with C. gracilis, C. thackerayi, C. agarwali and C. shevaroyensis. The gracilis clade emerged 48 ± 9 million years ago, in the Eocene epoch. Of the five species in the clade, only C. jackieii and C. gracilis inhabit the Western Ghats. C. jackieii is distinguished from C. gracilis by moderate genetic differences and significant differences in appearance and geographic distribution.

== Habitat and ecology ==
C. jackieii is recorded only in one location – in a deciduous forest within Vairavankulam Reserve Forest, in the southern Western Ghats in the Indian state of Tamil Nadu. It is found on rocks along streams.

== Etymology ==
For its ability to move rapidly and hide inside small crevices, Cnemaspis jackieii is named for Hong Kong actor Jackie Chan, who is famous for his agility.
