= Cnemaspis gotaimbarai =

Scientific classification
- Kingdom: Animalia
- Phylum: Chordata
- Class: Reptilia
- Order: Squamata
- Suborder: Gekkota
- Family: Gekkonidae
- Genus: Cnemaspis
- Species: C. gotaimbarai

Binomial name
- Cnemaspis gotaimbarai Silva, Bauer, Botejue, Ukuwela, Gabadage, Gorin, Poyarkov, Surasinghe & Karunarathna, 2019

Species of lizard

Cnemaspis gotaimbarai, or Gotaimbara's day gecko, is a species of diurnal gecko endemic to island of Sri Lanka.

== Etymology ==
The specific name gotaimbarai is named in honor of Giant Warrior Gotaimbara, who is a national hero fought in the battle against King Elara. He was the shortest of ten giant warriors in King Dutugemunu's army in stature but with enormous power. After the battle, he contributed to build Devanandaramaya temple, gifted to Buddhist monks.

== Taxonomy ==
The species is closely related to C. nandimithrai, C. ingerorum and C. kumarasinghei.

== Ecology ==
The species was discovered from area lies between 285–650 meters above sea level of Kokagala Forest Reserve, Padiyatalawa. Individuals are restricted to rock outcrops and granite caves in forested areas. It is sympatric with Calodactylodes illingworthorum and Hemidactylus hunae. Researchers identified the species is Critically Endangered due to low numbers and density.

== Description ==
An adult male is 32.9 mm long. Dorsum homogeneous with smooth granular scales. Chin, gular, pectoral and abdominal scales are smooth. There are 23–25 belly scales across mid body. Tubercles on posterior flank are weakly developed. Para vertebral granules linearly arranged. Body long and slender. Head large and depressed. Snout relatively long. Pupil round. Head, body and limbs are light brown to light grey dorsally. There are four to five irregular dirty white cloud-like blotches on the dorsum. Oblique black line present on canthal line. A longitudinal golden line is present on occipital area. Lateral surfaces of trunk covered with three to four irregular cream white spots. Tail brownish black with six to seven faded brown cross-bands.

== Media controversy ==
Several Sri Lankan media as well many parliamentarians criticized the usage of popular people's name for specific name. The argument was largely due to unknowing about binomial nomenclature in zoological taxonomy among people. They indicated that the usage of heroes' names gives by equating the national heroes to geckos. However, researchers neglect that sentence and explained that the name is given only to honor the personality.
