= Cnemaspis nandimithrai =

Scientific classification
- Kingdom: Animalia
- Phylum: Chordata
- Class: Reptilia
- Order: Squamata
- Suborder: Gekkota
- Family: Gekkonidae
- Genus: Cnemaspis
- Species: C. nandimithrai

Binomial name
- Cnemaspis nandimithrai Silva, Bauer, Botejue, Ukuwela, Gabadage, Gorin, Poyarkov, Surasinghe & Karunarathna, 2019

Species of lizard

Cnemaspis nandimithrai, or Nandimithra's day gecko, is a species of diurnal gecko endemic to island of Sri Lanka.

== Etymology ==
The specific name nandimithrai is named in honor of Giant Warrior Nandimithra, who is a national hero fought in the battle against King Elara. He was the strongest of ten giant warriors in King Dutugemunu's army. After the battle, he contributed to rebuilding Kudumbigala Monastery, gifted to Buddhist monks.

== Taxonomy ==
The species is closely related to C. gotaimbarai, C. ingerorum and C. kumarasinghei.

== Ecology ==
The species was discovered from area lies between 12 and 67 meters above sea level of Kudumbigala Sanctuary, Ampara. Individuals are restricted to rock outcrops and the interior of granite caves in forested areas. It is sympatric with Calodactylodes illingworthorum and Hemidactylus hunae. Researchers identified the species is Critically Endangered due to low numbers and density.

== Description ==
An adult male is 27.9 mm long. Dorsum homogeneous with smooth granular scales. Chin, gular, pectoral and abdominal scales are smooth. There are 25– 27 belly scales across mid body. Tubercles on posterior flank are weakly developed. Para vertebral granules linearly arranged. Body short and slender. Head large and depressed. Snout relatively long. Pupil round. Head, body and limbs are light grey to light brown dorsally. There are five irregular black bands on the dorsum. Oblique black line present between eye and nostrils on both sides. A dark longitudinal line is present on occipital area. Lateral surfaces of trunk covered with irregular cream spots. Tail grayish white with three faded brown cross-bands.

== Media controversy ==
Several Sri Lankan media as well many parliamentarians criticized the usage of national hero's name for specific name. The argument was largely due to unknowing about binomial nomenclature in zoological taxonomy among people. They indicated that the usage of heroes' names gives by equating the national heroes to geckos. However, researchers neglect that sentence and explained that the name is given only to honor the personality.
