= Cnemaspis hitihamii =

Scientific classification
- Kingdom: Animalia
- Phylum: Chordata
- Class: Reptilia
- Order: Squamata
- Suborder: Gekkota
- Family: Gekkonidae
- Genus: Cnemaspis
- Species: C. hitihamii

Binomial name
- Cnemaspis hitihamii Silva, Bauer, Botejue, Ukuwela, Gabadage, Gorin, Poyarkov, Surasinghe & Karunarathna, 2019

Species of lizard

Cnemaspis hitihamii, or Hitihami's day gecko, is a species of diurnal gecko endemic to island of Sri Lanka.

== Etymology ==
The specific name hitihamii is named in honor of Sri Lankan warrior Meegahapitiye Walauwe Hitihami Mudiyanse Rate Rala, who is a national hero fought in the Great Rebellion of 1817–1818 occurred in Uva-Wellassa against British rule. It was the third Kandyan War led by Keppetipola Disawe.

== Taxonomy ==
The species is a sister species of C. nilgala.

== Ecology ==
The species was discovered from area lies between 354–567 meters above sea level from a granite cave in Maragalakanda area, Monaragala. Individuals are restricted to rock outcrops and granite caves in forested areas. It is sympatric with many geckoes such as Calodactylodes illingworthorum and Hemidactylus hunae. Researchers identified the species is Critically Endangered due to low numbers and density only recorded from seven locations.

== Description ==
An adult male is 41.7 mm long. Dorsum homogeneous with smooth granular scales. Chin, gular, pectoral and abdominal scales are smooth. There are 21 belly scales across mid body. Tubercles on posterior flank are well developed. Para vertebral granules linearly arranged. Body long and slender. Head small and depressed. Snout relatively short. Pupil round. Head, body and limbs are golden brown to dark brown mixed with light grey dorsally. There are five to seven irregular black paravertebral spots. Short black longitudinal line present on occipital area. A row of white spots present along vertebral line. Tail cinnamon brown with 8-12 faded grey cross-bands.

== Media controversy ==
Several Sri Lankan media as well many parliamentarians criticized the usage of popular people's name for specific name. The argument was largely due to unknowing about binomial nomenclature in zoological taxonomy among people. They indicated that the usage of heroes' names gives by equating the national heroes to geckos. However, researchers rejected this and explained that the name is given only to honor the personality.
