= Hypsirhynchus polylepis =

Conservation status
- Endangered (IUCN 3.1)

Scientific classification
- Kingdom: Animalia
- Phylum: Chordata
- Class: Reptilia
- Order: Squamata
- Suborder: Serpentes
- Family: Colubridae
- Genus: Hypsirhynchus
- Species: H. polylepis

Binomial name
- Hypsirhynchus polylepis (Buden, 1966)

Species of snake

Hypsirhynchus polylepis, the Jamaican long-tailed racer or Jamaican long-tailed ground snake, is a species of snake in the family Colubridae. The species is endemic to Jamaica.
