= Omoadiphas =

Scientific classification
- Kingdom: Animalia
- Phylum: Chordata
- Class: Reptilia
- Order: Squamata
- Suborder: Serpentes
- Family: Colubridae
- Subfamily: Dipsadinae
- Genus: Omoadiphas; G. Köhler, Wilson & McCranie, 2001

Genus of snakes

Omoadiphas is a genus of snakes in the family Colubridae. The genus is endemic to Honduras.

== Species and geographic ranges ==
The following three species are recognized as being valid. Each is found in a different mountain range in a different department of Honduras.

- Omoadiphas aurula G. Köhler, Wilson & McCranie, 2001 – Sierra de Omoa, Cortés Department
- Omoadiphas cannula McCranie & Cruz Díaz, 2010 – Sierra de Agalta, Olancho Department
- Omoadiphas texiguatensis McCranie & Castañeda, 2004 – Cordillera Nombre de Dios, Yoro Department
