= Capitellum (lizard) =

Scientific classification
- Kingdom: Animalia
- Phylum: Chordata
- Class: Reptilia
- Order: Squamata
- Family: Scincidae
- Subfamily: Mabuyinae
- Genus: Capitellum; Hedges & Conn, 2012

Species
- 3 species, see text

Genus of lizards

Capitellum is a genus of skinks. Species were previously placed in the genus Mabuya. All species in this genus are considered possibly extinct, due to a lack of recent sightings but the presence of potential refuges.

== Species ==
The following 3 species, listed alphabetically by specific name, are recognized as being valid:

- Capitellum mariagalantae Hedges & Conn, 2012 – Marie-Galante skink (possibly extinct)
- Capitellum metallicum (Bocourt, 1879) – lesser Martinique skink (possibly extinct)
- Capitellum parvicruzae Hedges & Conn, 2012 – lesser Saint Croix skink (possibly extinct)

Nota bene: A binomial authority in parentheses indicates that the species was originally described in a genus other than Capitellum.
