= Hypsirhynchus ferox =

Conservation status
- Least Concern (IUCN 3.1)

Scientific classification
- Kingdom: Animalia
- Phylum: Chordata
- Class: Reptilia
- Order: Squamata
- Suborder: Serpentes
- Family: Colubridae
- Genus: Hypsirhynchus
- Species: H. ferox

Binomial name
- Hypsirhynchus ferox Günther, 1858

Species of snake

Hypsirhynchus ferox, the Hispaniolan hog-nosed racer or Hispaniola cat-eyed snake, is a species of snake in the family Colubridae. The species is native to Haiti and the Dominican Republic.
