= Emmochliophis fugleri =

Conservation status
- Data Deficient (IUCN 3.1)

Scientific classification
- Kingdom: Animalia
- Phylum: Chordata
- Class: Reptilia
- Order: Squamata
- Suborder: Serpentes
- Family: Colubridae
- Genus: Emmochliophis
- Species: E. fugleri

Binomial name
- Emmochliophis fugleri Fritts & H.M. Smith, 1969

Species of snake

Emmochliophis fugleri, also known commonly as Fugler's shadow snake, the Pichincha snake, and the Pinchinda snake, is a species of snake in the family Colubridae. The species is endemic to Ecuador. This species went missing in 1969, before an individual was found in 2019.

== Etymology ==
The specific name, fugleri, is in honor of American biologist Charles M. Fugler.

== Geographic range ==
E. fugleri is found in western mainland Ecuador, in Santo Domingo de los Tsáchilas Province.

== Description ==
A small snake, E. fulgeri has a snout-to-vent length (SVL) of about 25 cm (9.8 in). It is black dorsally, and bluish gray ventrally. The dorsal scales are in 19 rows throughout the length of the body. The ventrals number fewer than 150.

== Habitat ==
The preferred natural habitat of E. fugleri is forest, at altitudes of about 450 m (1,480 ft).

== Reproduction ==
E. fugleri is oviparous.
