= Hypsirhynchus scalaris =

Conservation status
- Vulnerable (IUCN 3.1)

Scientific classification
- Kingdom: Animalia
- Phylum: Chordata
- Class: Reptilia
- Order: Squamata
- Suborder: Serpentes
- Family: Colubridae
- Genus: Hypsirhynchus
- Species: H. scalaris

Binomial name
- Hypsirhynchus scalaris Cope, 1862

Species of snake

Hypsirhynchus scalaris, the Tiburon hog-nosed racer, is a species of snake in the family Colubridae. The species is native to Haiti and the Dominican Republic.
