= Hypsirhynchus callilaemus =

Conservation status
- Least Concern (IUCN 3.1)

Scientific classification
- Kingdom: Animalia
- Phylum: Chordata
- Class: Reptilia
- Order: Squamata
- Suborder: Serpentes
- Family: Colubridae
- Genus: Hypsirhynchus
- Species: H. callilaemus

Binomial name
- Hypsirhynchus callilaemus (Gosse, 1851)

Species of snake

Hypsirhynchus callilaemus, the Jamaican red racer, Jamaican red racerlet, or Jamaican red ground snake, is a species of snake in the family Colubridae. The species is native to Jamaica. It is found on all parishes of the island except Hanover and forages for lizards and frogs in the night.
