= Hypsirhynchus funereus =

Conservation status
- Least Concern (IUCN 3.1)

Scientific classification
- Kingdom: Animalia
- Phylum: Chordata
- Class: Reptilia
- Order: Squamata
- Suborder: Serpentes
- Family: Colubridae
- Genus: Hypsirhynchus
- Species: H. funereus

Binomial name
- Hypsirhynchus funereus (Cope, 1862)

Species of snake

Hypsirhynchus funereus, the Jamaican black racer, Jamaican black racerlet, or Jamaican black ground snake, is a species of snake in the family Colubridae. The species is native to Jamaica.
