= Emmochliophis =

Scientific classification
- Kingdom: Animalia
- Phylum: Chordata
- Class: Reptilia
- Order: Squamata
- Suborder: Serpentes
- Family: Colubridae
- Subfamily: Dipsadinae
- Genus: Emmochliophis; Fritts & H.M. Smith, 1969

Genus of snakes

Emmochliophis is a genus of snakes in the family Colubridae. The genus is endemic to Ecuador.

== Species ==
The genus Emmochliophis contains two species which are considered valid.

- Emmochliophis fugleri Fritts & H.M. Smith, 1969 – Fugler's shadow snake, Pichincha snake, Pinchinda snake
  - A single specimen was found in the Río Manduriacu reserve during an amphibian and reptile survey in 2019. Only the second to be found, the first was in 1965 from lowland, humid semi-deciduous forests of the Ecuadorian Chocó, in the south of Santo Domingo de los Tsachilas province.
- Emmochliophis miops (Boulenger, 1898)

Nota bene: A binomial authority in parentheses indicates that the species was originally described in a genus other than Emmochliophis.
