= Omoadiphas aurula =

Conservation status
- Vulnerable (IUCN 3.1)

Scientific classification
- Kingdom: Animalia
- Phylum: Chordata
- Class: Reptilia
- Order: Squamata
- Suborder: Serpentes
- Family: Colubridae
- Genus: Omoadiphas
- Species: O. aurula

Binomial name
- Omoadiphas aurula G. Köhler, Wilson & McCranie, 2001

Species of snake

Omoadiphas aurula is a species of snake in the family Dipsadidae.

It is found in the mountain range Sierra de Omoa of Cortés Department, Honduras.

== Original publications ==
- Köhler, Wilson & Mccranie, 2001 : A new genus and species of colubrid snake from the Sierra de Omoa of northwestern Honduras (Reptilia, Squamata). Senckenbergiana biologica, vol. 81, p. 269-276.
