= Hypsirhynchus =

Scientific classification
- Kingdom: Animalia
- Phylum: Chordata
- Class: Reptilia
- Order: Squamata
- Suborder: Serpentes
- Family: Colubridae
- Subfamily: Dipsadinae
- Genus: Hypsirhynchus; Günther, 1858

Genus of snakes

Hypsirhynchus is a genus of snakes of the subfamily Dipsadinae. found on Jamaica, Hispaniola (Haiti and the Dominican Republic), and the Bahamas.

== Species ==
- Hypsirhynchus ater (Gosse, 1851) - Jamaican giant racer, Jamaican racer
- Hypsirhynchus callilaemus (Gosse, 1851) - Jamaican red racer, Jamaican red racerlet, Jamaican red ground snake
- Hypsirhynchus ferox Günther, 1858 - Hispaniolan hog-nosed racer, Hispaniola cat-eyed snake
- Hypsirhynchus funereus (Cope, 1862) - Jamaican black racer, Jamaican black racerlet, Jamaican black ground snake
- Hypsirhynchus melanichnus (Cope, 1862) - Hispaniolan olive racer, La Vega racer
- Hypsirhynchus parvifrons (Cope, 1862) - common Hispaniolan racer, Cope's Antilles snake, Hispaniolan black racer
- Hypsirhynchus polylepis (Buden, 1966) - Jamaican long-tailed racer, Jamaican long-tailed ground snake
- Hypsirhynchus scalaris Cope, 1863 - Tiburon hog-nosed racer
