= Hypsirhynchus parvifrons =

Conservation status
- Least Concern (IUCN 3.1)

Scientific classification
- Kingdom: Animalia
- Phylum: Chordata
- Class: Reptilia
- Order: Squamata
- Suborder: Serpentes
- Family: Colubridae
- Genus: Hypsirhynchus
- Species: H. parvifrons

Binomial name
- Hypsirhynchus parvifrons (Cope, 1862)

Species of snake

Hypsirhynchus parvifrons, the common Hispaniolan racer, Cope's Antilles snake, or Hispaniolan black racer is a species of snake in the family Colubridae. The species is native to Haiti, the Dominican Republic, and the Bahamas.
