= Anolis muralla =

Conservation status
- Critically Endangered (IUCN 3.1)

Scientific classification
- Kingdom: Animalia
- Phylum: Chordata
- Class: Reptilia
- Order: Squamata
- Suborder: Iguania
- Family: Anolidae
- Genus: Anolis
- Species: A. muralla

Binomial name
- Anolis muralla (Köhler, McCranie, & Wilson, 1999)

Species of lizard

Anolis muralla is a species of lizard in the family Dactyloidae. The species is found in Honduras.
