= Cnemaspis rajakarunai =

Scientific classification
- Kingdom: Animalia
- Phylum: Chordata
- Class: Reptilia
- Order: Squamata
- Suborder: Gekkota
- Family: Gekkonidae
- Genus: Cnemaspis
- Species: C. rajakarunai

Binomial name
- Cnemaspis rajakarunai Wickramasinghe, Vidanapathirana & Rathnayaka, 2016

Species of lizard

Cnemaspis rajakarunai, also known as Rajakaruna's day gecko, is a species of diurnal geckos endemic to island of Sri Lanka, from Lowland Rainforest near Salgala. The species can be identified due to absence of precloacal pores. Male is known to ranges from 36–40 mm in length from snout to vent.

== Etymology ==
The specific name rajakarunai is named in honor of Henry Rajakaruna, who is a grandmaster in Sri Lankan photography.
