= Capitellum metallicum =

Conservation status
- Critically endangered, possibly extinct (IUCN 3.1)

Scientific classification
- Kingdom: Animalia
- Phylum: Chordata
- Class: Reptilia
- Order: Squamata
- Suborder: Scinciformata
- Infraorder: Scincomorpha
- Family: Mabuyidae
- Genus: Capitellum
- Species: C. metallicum

Binomial name
- Capitellum metallicum (Bocourt, 1879)

Species of lizard

Capitellum metallicum, the lesser Martinique skink, is a species of skink found in Martinique.
