= Cyrtodactylus montanus =

Conservation status
- Critically Endangered (IUCN 3.1)

Scientific classification
- Kingdom: Animalia
- Phylum: Chordata
- Class: Reptilia
- Order: Squamata
- Suborder: Gekkota
- Family: Gekkonidae
- Genus: Cyrtodactylus
- Species: C. montanus

Binomial name
- Cyrtodactylus montanus Agarwal, Mahony, Giri, Chaitanya, & Bauer, 2018

Species of lizard

Cyrtodactylus montanus is a species of gecko. It is endemic to Jampui Hills in Northeast India.

This species grows to at least 78 mm (3.1 in) in snout–vent length.
