= Cnemaspis godagedarai =

Scientific classification
- Kingdom: Animalia
- Phylum: Chordata
- Class: Reptilia
- Order: Squamata
- Suborder: Gekkota
- Family: Gekkonidae
- Genus: Cnemaspis
- Species: C. godagedarai

Binomial name
- Cnemaspis godagedarai Silva, Bauer, Botejue & Karunarathna, 2019

Species of lizard

Cnemaspis godagedarai, or Godagedara's day gecko, is a species of diurnal gecko endemic to island of Sri Lanka, described in 2019 from Matara.

== Etymology ==
The specific name godagedarai is named in honor of Godagedara Rate Adikaram, who is a national hero fought in the uprising against the British colonial government from 1817 to 1818.

== Taxonomy ==
The species is closely related to C. gemunu, C. phillipsi, and C. scalpensis.

== Ecology ==
The species was discovered from area lies between 700 and 800 meters (2,300 and 2,600 ft) above sea level of Ensalwatte, Matara. The forest patch is isolated from the rest of the forest canopy by streams.

== Description ==
Dorsum of head, body and limbs generally grayish brown;. There are three large irregular cinnamon brown blotches along the vertebral line. A distinct narrow short longitudinal black line found on occipital area. Tail with cinnamon brown dorsal color, with 12 faded black cross-bands. Circular pupil is black in color with surrounding yellow and pale brown margins. Supraciliaries brownish. There are two postorbital stripes are present on each side with white upper black lower areas. A light and dark inter-orbital stripe present. Pale yellowish chin and gular scales.
