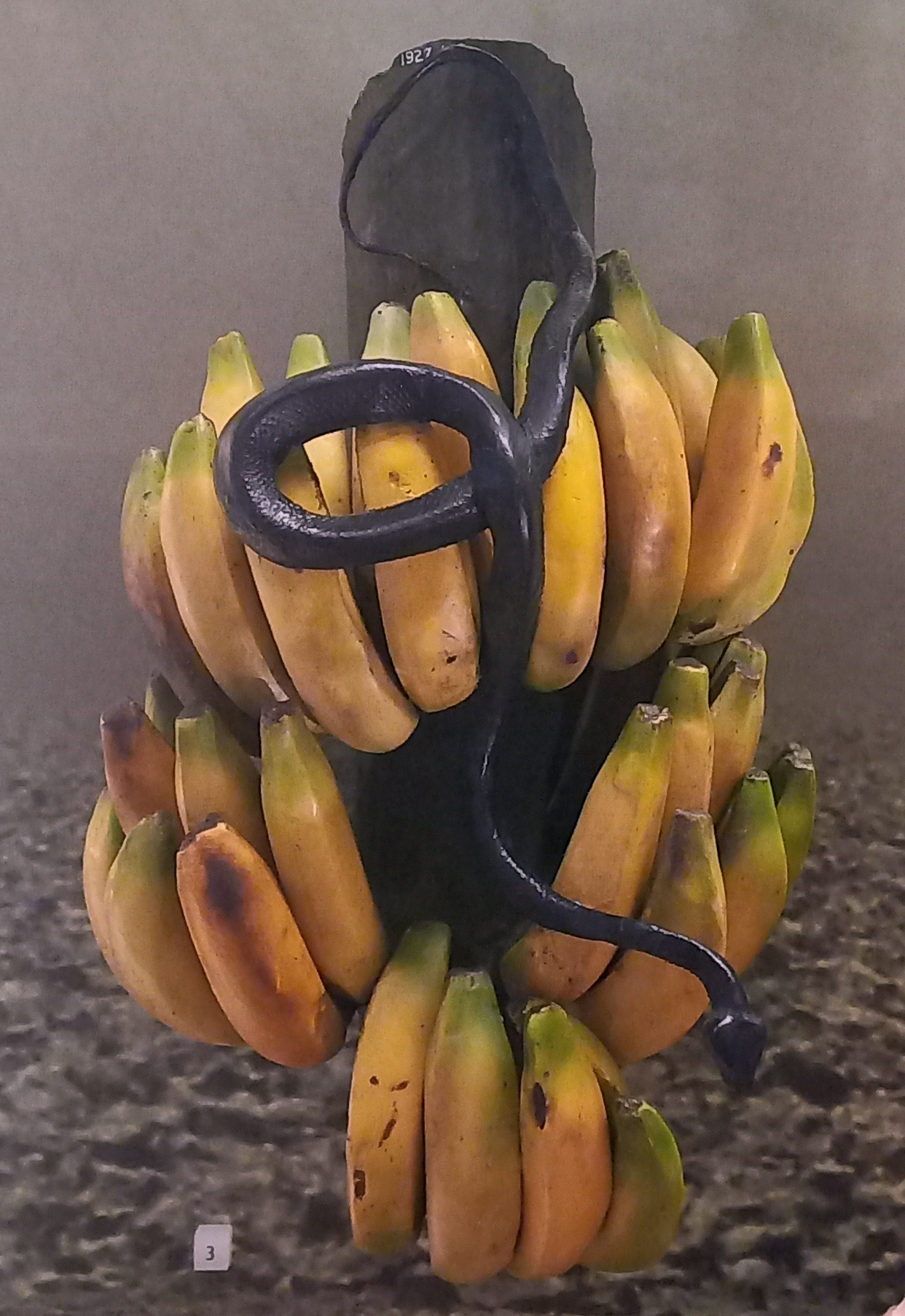
- Specimen in National Museum of Scotland

Conservation status
- Critically endangered, possibly extinct (IUCN 3.1)

Scientific classification
- Kingdom: Animalia
- Phylum: Chordata
- Class: Reptilia
- Order: Squamata
- Suborder: Serpentes
- Family: Colubridae
- Genus: Hypsirhynchus
- Species: H. ater

Binomial name
- Hypsirhynchus ater (Gosse, 1851)

= Hypsirhynchus ater =

Species of snake

Hypsirhynchus ater, the Jamaican giant racer or Jamaican racer, is a species of snake in the family Colubridae. The species is native to Jamaica.
