= Cnemaspis nilgala =

Scientific classification
- Kingdom: Animalia
- Phylum: Chordata
- Class: Reptilia
- Order: Squamata
- Suborder: Gekkota
- Family: Gekkonidae
- Genus: Cnemaspis
- Species: C. nilgala

Binomial name
- Cnemaspis nilgala Mendis Wickramasinghe & Munindradasa, 2007

Species of lizard

Cnemaspis nilgala, also known as Nilgala day gecko, is a species of diurnal gecko endemic to island of Sri Lanka.

== Description ==
Adult is relatively smaller than other Cnemaspis species, ranges SVL 31.5–32.9 mm in length. Dorsal scales are homogeneous. Smooth ventral scales on trunk. 17–19 scales found across the belly. 122–129 ventral scales and 7–8 supralabials. Subdigitals scansors unnotched. precloacal pores are absent in males.
