= Cyrtodactylus jaegeri =

Conservation status
- Critically Endangered (IUCN 3.1)

Scientific classification
- Kingdom: Animalia
- Phylum: Chordata
- Class: Reptilia
- Order: Squamata
- Suborder: Gekkota
- Family: Gekkonidae
- Genus: Cyrtodactylus
- Species: C. jaegeri

Binomial name
- Cyrtodactylus jaegeri Luu, Calame, Bonkowski, T.Q. Nguyen & Ziegler, 2014

Species of lizard

Cyrtodactylus jaegeri is a species of gecko, a lizard in the family Gekkonidae. The species is endemic to Laos.

== Etymology ==
The specific name, jaegeri, is in honor of German arachnologist Peter Jäger.

== Geographic range ==
C. jaegeri is found in Khammouane Province, Laos.

== Habitat ==
The preferred natural habitats of C. jaegeri are forest and rocky areas, at an altitude of 170 m (560 ft).

== Description ==
C. jaegeri differs from other species of Indo-Chinese Cyrtodactylus by having a maximum snout-vent length (SVL) of 68.5 millimetres (2.70 in); its dorsal pattern consisting of a dark loop and four brown bands between limb insertions; dorsal tubercles in 15–17 irregular rows; lateral skin folds with dispersed tubercles; enlarged femoral scales present; and its subcaudal tubercles transversely enlarged.

== Reproduction ==
The mode of reproduction of C. jaegeri is unknown.
