= Cnemaspis kohukumburai =

Scientific classification
- Kingdom: Animalia
- Phylum: Chordata
- Class: Reptilia
- Order: Squamata
- Suborder: Gekkota
- Family: Gekkonidae
- Genus: Cnemaspis
- Species: C. kohukumburai

Binomial name
- Cnemaspis kohukumburai Silva, Bauer, Botejue, Ukuwela, Gabadage, Gorin, Poyarkov, Surasinghe & Karunarathna, 2019

Species of lizard

Cnemaspis kohukumburai, or Kohukumbura's day gecko, is a species of diurnal gecko endemic to island of Sri Lanka.

== Etymology ==
The specific name kohukumburai is named in honor of Sri Lankan warrior Kohukumbure Walauwe Rate Rala, who is a national hero fought in the Great Rebellion of 1817–1818 occurred in Uva-Wellassa against British rule. It was the third Kandyan War led by Keppetipola Disawe.

== Taxonomy ==
The species is closely related to C. alwisi and C. rajakarunai.

== Ecology ==
The species was discovered from area lies between 354 and 567 meters above sea level of a tropical wet evergreen forest, Kadugannawa. Individuals are restricted to rock outcrops and granite caves in forested areas. It is sympatric with many geckoes such as Cnemaspis kandiana, Gehyra mutilata, Hemidactylus depressus, H. frenatus, H. parvimaculatus, Hemiphyllodactylus typus. Researchers identified the species is Critically Endangered due to low numbers and density only recorded from three locations.

== Description ==
An adult male is 33.9 mm long. Dorsum homogeneous with smooth granular scales. The snake has smooth chin, gular, pectoral, and abdominal scales. It features 23 belly scales across the mid-body. Tubercles on the posterior flank are prominent, and para-vertebral granules are arranged in a linear pattern. The body is short and slender, with a large, depressed head and a relatively short snout. The pupil is round. Dorsally, the head, body, and limbs exhibit light brown and light grey coloring. There are five irregular cloud-like black bands on the back. Two oblique black and white lines present between the eye and nostrils. A straight, dark brown postorbital stripe present. Broad dark spots present on occipital area. Lateral surfaces of trunk covered with irregular cream white spots. Tail brownish with nine faded grey cross-bands.

== Media controversy ==
Several Sri Lankan media as well many parliamentarians criticized the usage of popular people's name for specific name. The argument was largely due to unknowing about binomial nomenclature in zoological taxonomy among people. They indicated that the usage of heroes' names gives by equating the national heroes to geckos. However, researchers neglect that sentence and explained that the name is given only to honor the personality.
