= Takou bent-toed gecko =

Conservation status
- Critically Endangered (IUCN 3.1)

Scientific classification
- Kingdom: Animalia
- Phylum: Chordata
- Class: Reptilia
- Order: Squamata
- Suborder: Gekkota
- Family: Gekkonidae
- Genus: Cyrtodactylus
- Species: C. takouensis

Binomial name
- Cyrtodactylus takouensis Ngo & Bauer, 2008

Species of lizard

The Takou bent-toed gecko (Cyrtodactylus takouensis) is a species of gecko that is endemic to southern Vietnam.
