= Anolis villai =

Conservation status
- Critically Endangered (IUCN 3.1)

Scientific classification
- Kingdom: Animalia
- Phylum: Chordata
- Class: Reptilia
- Order: Squamata
- Suborder: Iguania
- Family: Anolidae
- Genus: Anolis
- Species: A. villai

Binomial name
- Anolis villai Fitch & Henderson, 1976

Species of lizard

Anolis villai, the Great Corn Island anole or country anole, is a species of lizard in the family Dactyloidae. The species is found on Great Corn Island in Nicaragua.
