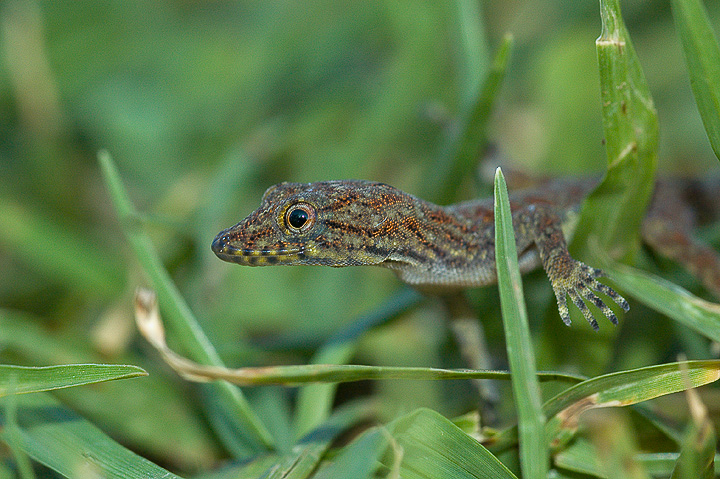

Conservation status
- Critically Endangered (IUCN 3.1)

Scientific classification
- Kingdom: Animalia
- Phylum: Chordata
- Class: Reptilia
- Order: Squamata
- Suborder: Gekkota
- Family: Gekkonidae
- Genus: Cnemaspis
- Species: C. tropidogaster

Binomial name
- Cnemaspis tropidogaster (Boulenger, 1885)
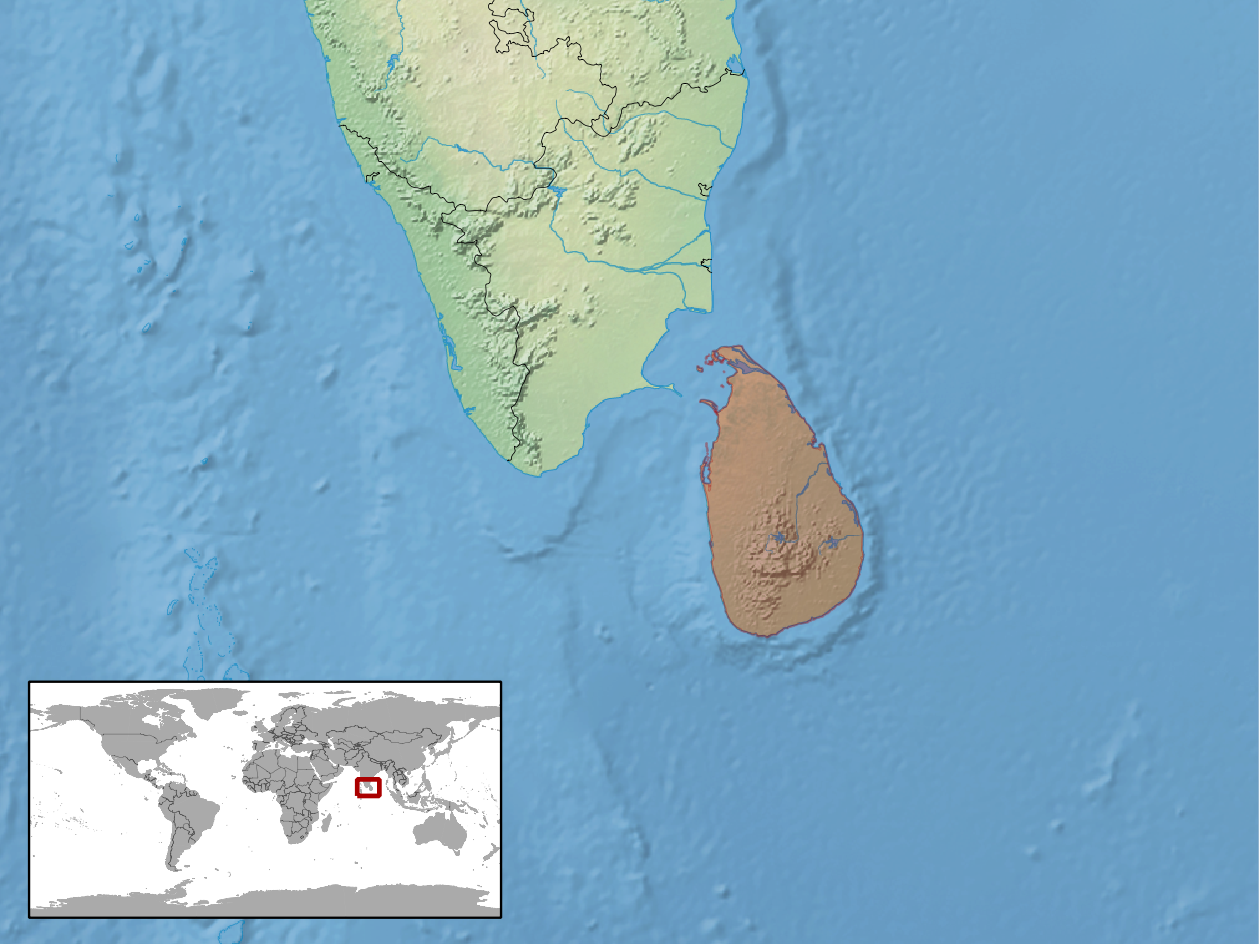

= Rough-bellied day gecko =

Species of lizard

The rough-bellied day gecko (Cnemaspis tropidogaster) is a species of day geckos found in the Western Ghats of India and Sri Lanka. Its distribution in the southern Western Ghats is patchy and relatively uncommon. It is active during the day. It has a distinct head, elongated snout, and keeled ventral scales; Its dark-brown dorsal side has transverse arrangement of light and dark variegations. It is pale brown/cream on its underside with spiny tubercles on its sides. Males have two to four preanal and three to six femoral pores.

Live populations were rediscovered nearly after 120 years from Sri Lanka in 2016 from a low elevation (50–80 m (160–260 ft) asl.) of the wet zone of Sri Lanka.

== Habitat and distribution ==
A relatively uncommon day active gecko from the midhills of the Central Province Knuckles Mountain Range and also from Sabaragamuwa Province and parts of the monsoon forests in the Eastern Province of Sri Lanka.

== Ecology and diet ==
Diurnal and crepuscular species, often found in rocky substrates and low trunks of trees, and occasionally entering man-made structures, such as thatched huts and cowsheds.
