= Cyrtodactylus nigriocularis =

Conservation status
- Critically Endangered (IUCN 3.1)

Scientific classification
- Kingdom: Animalia
- Phylum: Chordata
- Class: Reptilia
- Order: Squamata
- Suborder: Gekkota
- Family: Gekkonidae
- Genus: Cyrtodactylus
- Species: C. nigriocularis

Binomial name
- Cyrtodactylus nigriocularis Nguyen, N. S., Orlov, N. L., & Darevsky, I. S., 2006

Species of lizard

Cyrtodactylus nigriocularis or black eyed bent-toed gecko is a species of gecko endemic to Southern Vietnam. More specifically it is found on the Ba Den Mountain (Black Virgin Mountain) which is located in the Tây Ninh Province.

== Description ==
This species can be distinguished by its large black eyes, grey or dark brown colored body, depressed head with a wide and depressed snout; its moderately slender body, which is elongate, with developed ventrolateral folds; moderately long limbs and digits long; a tail that is longer than the snout-vent length, which carries large undivided subcaudals;13–14 upper labials, 13–15 lower labials, 17–21 narrow subdigital lamellae on its fourth toe; about 119–145 scale rows around its midbody; and no femoral large scales present.

== Behavior and ecology ==
C. nigriocularis is a cave-dwelling species. It lives in caves near streams on granite formations.

Native range and range of verifiable sightings.

== Diet ==
The diet of C. nigriocularis is made up of primarily different species of spiders, but it also includes certain snails and slugs, centipedes, grasshoppers, and cockroaches.
