= Cnemaspis temiah =

Scientific classification
- Kingdom: Animalia
- Phylum: Chordata
- Class: Reptilia
- Order: Squamata
- Suborder: Gekkota
- Family: Gekkonidae
- Genus: Cnemaspis
- Species: C. temiah

Binomial name
- Cnemaspis temiah Grismer et al., 2014

Species of lizard

Cnemaspis temiah is a species of gecko from Cameron Highlands, Pahang, Malaysia.
