= Cyrtodactylus celatus =

Scientific classification
- Kingdom: Animalia
- Phylum: Chordata
- Class: Reptilia
- Order: Squamata
- Suborder: Gekkota
- Family: Gekkonidae
- Genus: Cyrtodactylus
- Species: C. celatus

Binomial name
- Cyrtodactylus celatus Kathriner, Bauer, O'shea, Sanchez, & Kaiser, 2014

Species of lizard

Cyrtodactylus celatus, the Hidden bent-toed gecko is a species of gecko that is endemic to West Timor.
