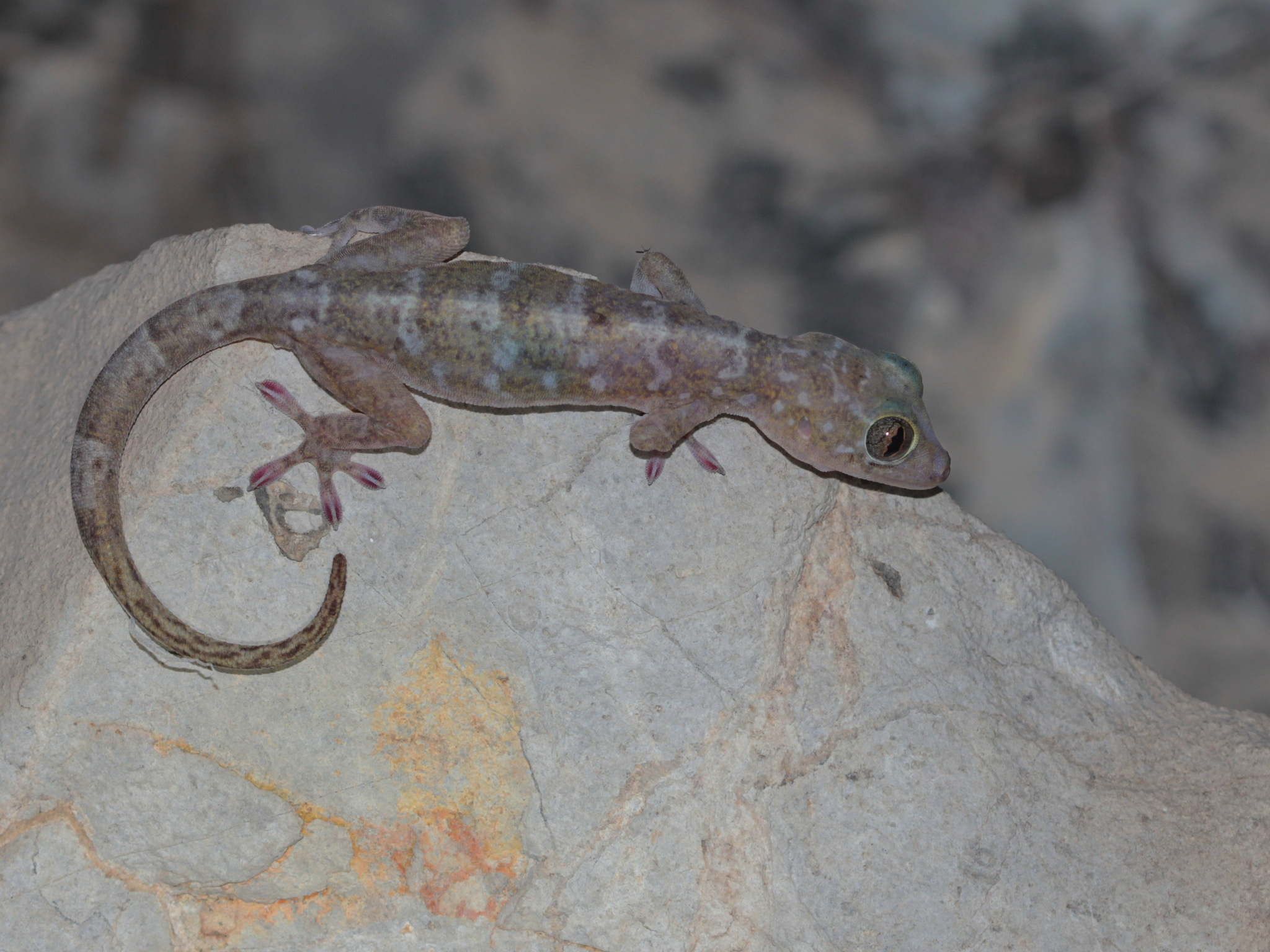

Conservation status
- Critically Endangered (IUCN 3.1)

Scientific classification
- Kingdom: Animalia
- Phylum: Chordata
- Class: Reptilia
- Order: Squamata
- Suborder: Gekkota
- Family: Gekkonidae
- Genus: Gekko
- Species: G. lauhachindai

Binomial name
- Gekko lauhachindai Panitvong, Sumontha, Konlek & Kunya, 2010

Synonyms
- Gekko lauhachindai Panitvong, Sumontha, Konlek & Kunya, 2010; Gekko (Japonigekko) lauhachindai — Wood et al., 2019; Gekko (Sundagekko) lauhachindaei [sic] — Wood et al., 2019 (ex errore)

= Lauhachinda's cave gecko =

Species of lizard

Lauhachinda's cave gecko (Gekko lauhachindai) is an endangered species of lizard in the family Gekkonidae. The species is endemic to Thailand.

== Etymology ==
The specific name, lauhachindai, is in honor of Thai herpetologist Virayuth Lauhachinda.

== Geographic range ==
G. lauhachindai is found in karst regions of central Thailand.

== Description ==
Medium-sized for its genus, G. lauhachindai as an adult has a snout-to-vent length over 10 cm (3.9 in). In life, the iris of the eye may be entirely coppery brown, or it may be greenish gray with coppery brown around the margins of the pupil.

G. lauhachindai is distinct from its congeners by its size, slender body shape, a relatively smaller snout-to-eye-diameter ratio, and the presence of large, bright whitish dorsal spots and horizontal bars.

== Behavior ==
Little is known regarding the behavioral patterns of G. lauhachindai. Lauhachinda's cave gecko feeds primarily on insects. Predators of this species include several species of snakes and domesticated cats. This gecko is thought to lay eggs in the dry months.

== Habitat ==
The preferred natural habitat of G. lauhachindai is dry caves. Its presence is restricted to limestone caves and in close proximity to the entrances of such caves. This habitat is shared with other members of Gekkonidae such as the tokay gecko G. gecko and Siamese green-eyed gecko G. siamensis.
