= Anolis koopmani =

Conservation status
- Critically Endangered (IUCN 3.1)

Scientific classification
- Kingdom: Animalia
- Phylum: Chordata
- Class: Reptilia
- Order: Squamata
- Suborder: Iguania
- Family: Dactyloidae
- Genus: Anolis
- Species: A. koopmani

Binomial name
- Anolis koopmani Rand, 1961

Synonyms
- Chamaelinorops koopmani (Rand, 1961); Deiroptyx koopmani (Rand, 1961)

Species of lizard

Anolis koopmani, also known commonly as the Haitian brown red-bellied anole and Koopman's anole, is a species of lizard in the family Dactyloidae. The species is endemic to Haiti.

== Etymology ==
The specific name, koopmani, is in honor of American mammalogist Karl F. Koopman.

== Habitat ==
The preferred natural habitats of A. koopmani are forest and shrubland, at altitudes of 240–750 m (790–2,460 ft).

== Reproduction ==
A. koopmani is oviparous.
