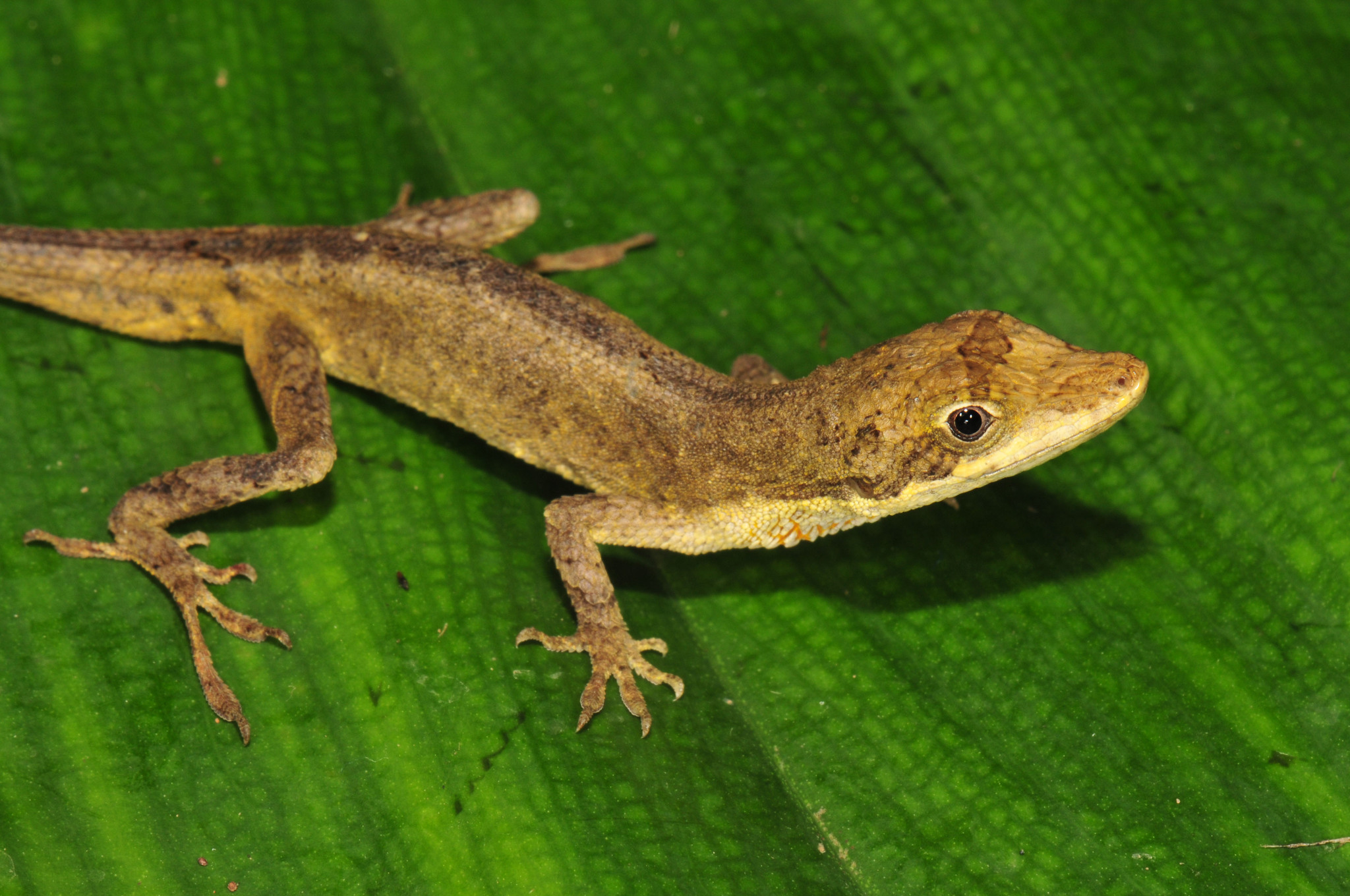

Conservation status
- Critically Endangered (IUCN 3.1)

Scientific classification
- Kingdom: Animalia
- Phylum: Chordata
- Class: Reptilia
- Order: Squamata
- Suborder: Iguania
- Family: Anolidae
- Genus: Anolis
- Species: A. amplisquamosus

Binomial name
- Anolis amplisquamosus (McCranie, Wilson, & Williams, 1993)

= Anolis amplisquamosus =

Species of lizard

Anolis amplisquamosus is a species of lizard in the family Dactyloidae. The species is found in Honduras.
