= Spotted giant gecko =

Scientific classification
- Kingdom: Animalia
- Phylum: Chordata
- Class: Reptilia
- Order: Squamata
- Suborder: Gekkota
- Family: Gekkonidae
- Genus: Hemidactylus
- Species: H. hunae

Binomial name
- Hemidactylus hunae Deraniyagala, 1937

Synonyms
- Hemidactylus maculatus hunae

Species of lizard

The spotted giant gecko (Hemidactylus hunae) is a species of gecko endemic to island of Sri Lanka.

== Habitat and distribution ==
The largest gecko found in Sri Lanka, inhabiting outcrops of the dry and intermediate regions of the island. Localities includes Nilgala, Okanda, Panamure, and Rambukkana.

== Description ==
Snout somewhat pointed. Forehead with large scattered scales. Back with 15-20 rows of tubercles. Ventrals smooth. Fingers and toes with divided scansors. Males are with 19-25 femoral pores. Mental scales are as long as wide. Dorsum grayish brown, with black blotches that are expanded into rhomboidal marks. Two dark streaks found along the eyes. Venter unpatterned creamy colored.

== Ecology and diet ==
Inhabits rocky outcrops, including caves and cracks in boulders, and more rarely on walls of buildings and on trees. In the former microhabitat, it was sympatric with Calodactylodes illingworthorum, but timing of activity is more at dusk, than largely diurnal habit of Calodactylodes illingworthorum. Diet comprises small insects, although others geckos are also known to be eaten.

== Reproduction ==
2 eggs are produced at a time measuring 10 * 12mm in March and August. Hatchlings measure 33m.
