= Gua Kanthan bent-toed gecko =

Scientific classification
- Kingdom: Animalia
- Phylum: Chordata
- Class: Reptilia
- Order: Squamata
- Suborder: Gekkota
- Family: Gekkonidae
- Genus: Cyrtodactylus
- Species: C. guakanthanensis

Binomial name
- Cyrtodactylus guakanthanensis Grismer, Belabut, Quah, Onn, Wood, & Hasim, 2014

Gecko endemic to Malaysia

Gua Kanthan bent-toed gecko (Cyrtodactylus guakanthanensis) is a species of gecko that is endemic to Malaysia.
