= Rhampholeon chapmanorum =

Conservation status
- Critically Endangered (IUCN 3.1)

Scientific classification
- Kingdom: Animalia
- Phylum: Chordata
- Class: Reptilia
- Order: Squamata
- Suborder: Iguania
- Family: Chamaeleonidae
- Genus: Rhampholeon
- Species: R. chapmanorum

Binomial name
- Rhampholeon chapmanorum Tilbury, 1992

Species of reptile

Rhampholeon chapmanorum, also known commonly as Chapmans' pygmy chameleon, is a species of terrestrial pygmy chameleon, a lizard in the family Chamaeleonidae. The species is endemic to forest fragments in the Natundu Hills, Malawi. It was described as a species new to science by Colin R. Tilbury in 1992, from a patch of lowland seasonal rainforest in the Matandwe Forest Reserve.

== Etymology ==
The specific name, chapmanorum (genitive, plural), is in honor of African naturalists James D. "Jim" Chapman and Elisabeth G. "Betty" Chapman, husband and wife.

== Geographic range and taxonomy ==
The species R. chapmanorum was originally believed to be found across several inselbergs and mountains, until molecular phylogenetic analysis confirmed that it was endemic to the remaining forest in Malawi, and that other species from Mozambique were endemic to individual mountains.

== Reproduction ==
R. chapmanorum is oviparous.

== Threats and conservation ==
B. chapmanorum is assessed under IUCN criterion B1ab(iii)+2ab(iii) as Critically Endangered, with the caveat "possibly extinct". It is threatened by the conversion of land to agricultural operations and destruction of forests for small-scale logging operations that have limited suitable habitat to two 0.6 km^{2} (0.23 m^{2}) patches of forest, averaging 0.29 km^{2} (0.11 mi^{2}) in size. R. chapmanorum requires intact forest floors to feed, and therefore is not recorded from transformed or disturbed forests, limiting further the amount of suitable habitats available for the species. Some individuals were seen in 1998 during the last survey of the area. This species is very small, growing to a total length (including tail) of 62 mm (2.4 in), yet only small populations could persist within these patches of forest. Although some areas of forest exist 3 km (1.9 mi) north, these are not included in assessments as they have recently been cleared and disturbed. R. chapmanorum is listed on the EDGE list of Reptiles as number 49, with an EDGE score of 5.72 and ED score of 18.142.
