= Anolis kreutzi =

Conservation status
- Critically Endangered (IUCN 3.1)

Scientific classification
- Kingdom: Animalia
- Phylum: Chordata
- Class: Reptilia
- Order: Squamata
- Suborder: Iguania
- Family: Anolidae
- Genus: Anolis
- Species: A. kreutzi

Binomial name
- Anolis kreutzi (McCranie, G. Köhler & Wilson, 2000)

Synonyms
- Norops kreutzi McCranie, G. Köhler & Wilson, 2000

Species of lizard

Anolis kreutzi is a species of lizard in the family Dactyloidae. The species is endemic to Honduras.

== Etymology ==
The specific name, kreutzi, is in honor of scientific illustrator Jörg Kreutz.

== Geographic range ==
A. kreutzi is found in northwestern Honduras in Atlántida Department and Yoro Department.

== Habitat ==
The preferred natural habitat of A. kreutzi is forest, at altitudes of 1,030–1,690 m (3,380–5,540 ft).

== Behavior ==
A. kreutzi is arboreal and diurnal.

== Reproduction ==
A. kreutzi is oviparous.
