= Cyrtodactylus chamba =

Scientific classification
- Kingdom: Animalia
- Phylum: Chordata
- Class: Reptilia
- Order: Squamata
- Suborder: Gekkota
- Family: Gekkonidae
- Genus: Cyrtodactylus
- Species: C. chamba

Binomial name
- Cyrtodactylus chamba Agarwal, Khandekar, & Bauer, 2018

Species of lizard

Cyrtodactylus chamba, also known as the Chamba bent-toed gecko, is a species of gecko endemic to India.
