= Cnemaspis minang =

Scientific classification
- Kingdom: Animalia
- Phylum: Chordata
- Class: Reptilia
- Order: Squamata
- Suborder: Gekkota
- Family: Gekkonidae
- Genus: Cnemaspis
- Species: C. minang

Binomial name
- Cnemaspis minang Iskandar, McGuire & Amarsinghe, 2017

Species of lizard

Cnemaspis minang is a species of gecko endemic to Sumatra in Indonesia.
