= Capitellum mariagalantae =

Conservation status
- Critically endangered, possibly extinct (IUCN 3.1)

Scientific classification
- Kingdom: Animalia
- Phylum: Chordata
- Class: Reptilia
- Order: Squamata
- Family: Scincidae
- Genus: Capitellum
- Species: C. mariagalantae

Binomial name
- Capitellum mariagalantae Hedges & Conn, 2012

Species of lizard

Capitellum mariagalantae, the Marie-Galante skink, is a species of skink found in Guadeloupe.
