= Gialai bent-toed gecko =

Scientific classification
- Kingdom: Animalia
- Phylum: Chordata
- Class: Reptilia
- Order: Squamata
- Suborder: Gekkota
- Family: Gekkonidae
- Genus: Cyrtodactylus
- Species: C. gialaiensis

Binomial name
- Cyrtodactylus gialaiensis Luu, Dung, Nguyen, Le, & Ziegler, 2017

Species of lizard

The Gialai bent-toed gecko (Cyrtodactylus gialaiensis) is a species of gecko that is endemic to Vietnam.
