= Cnemaspis butewai =

Scientific classification
- Kingdom: Animalia
- Phylum: Chordata
- Class: Reptilia
- Order: Squamata
- Suborder: Gekkota
- Family: Gekkonidae
- Genus: Cnemaspis
- Species: C. butewai

Binomial name
- Cnemaspis butewai Silva, Bauer, Botejue, Ukuwela, Gabadage, Gorin, Poyarkov, Surasinghe & Karunarathna, 2019

Species of lizard

Cnemaspis butewai, or Butewes' day gecko, is a species of diurnal gecko endemic to island of Sri Lanka.

== Etymology ==
The specific name butewai is named in honor of the Sri Lankan warrior Butewe Rate Rala, a national hero who fought in the Great Rebellion of 1817–1818 in Uva-Wellassa against British rule. It was the third Kandyan War led by Keppetipola Disawe.

== Taxonomy ==
The species is closely related to C. pulchra.

== Ecology ==
The species was discovered in an area lying between 380–850 meters of elevation in the Bambarabotuwa Forest Reserve. Individuals are restricted to rock outcrops and granite caves in forested areas. It is sympatric with many geckoes such as Cyrtodactylus sp., Gehyra mutilata, Hemidactylus depressus, H. frenatus and H. parvimaculatus. The species is critically endangered due to low numbers and density only recorded at six locations.

== Description ==
An adult male is 31.7 mm long. Dorsum homogeneous with smooth granular scales. Chin and gular scales are keeled whereas pectoral and abdominal scales are smooth. There are 23-25 belly scales across mid body. Tubercles on posterior flank are weakly developed. Para vertebral granules linearly arranged. Body short and slender. Head large and depressed. Snout relatively long. Pupil round. Head, body, and limbs are light brown to golden yellow dorsally. There are five to six W-shaped, dark cross bands on trunk. There is an oblique black line between eye and nostrils. A dark line present on occipital area. Tail grey-white with 10-12 faded brown cross-bands.

== Media controversy ==
Sri Lankan media and politicians criticized the vernacular usage of a hero's name for a gecko. The argument was largely due to ignorance of binomial nomenclature in zoological taxonomy. They indicated that the usage of heroes' names gives by equating the national heroes to geckos. Researchers responded that the name is given only to honor the personality.
