= Anolis altavelensis =

Conservation status
- Critically Endangered (IUCN 3.1)

Scientific classification
- Kingdom: Animalia
- Phylum: Chordata
- Class: Reptilia
- Order: Squamata
- Suborder: Iguania
- Family: Dactyloidae
- Genus: Anolis
- Species: A. altavelensis

Binomial name
- Anolis altavelensis Noble & Hassler, 1933

Species of lizard

Anolis altavelensis, the Alto Velo gracile anole or Noble's anole, is a species of lizard in the family Dactyloidae. The species is found on Alto Velo Island in the Dominican Republic.
