= Kokagala =

- Location within Sri Lanka

Highest point
- Elevation: 687 m (2,254 ft)
- Coordinates: 7°25′00″N 81°12′29″E

Geography
- Location: Sri Lanka

Kokagala is an isolated mountain in the Ampara District of Sri Lanka. At a summit elevation of 687 m (2,254 ft), it is the 19th tallest mountain in Sri Lanka.

== See also ==
- List of mountains of Sri Lanka
