= Liolaemus azarai =

Conservation status
- Critically Endangered (IUCN 3.1)

Scientific classification
- Kingdom: Animalia
- Phylum: Chordata
- Class: Reptilia
- Order: Squamata
- Suborder: Iguania
- Family: Liolaemidae
- Genus: Liolaemus
- Species: L. azarai

Binomial name
- Liolaemus azarai Avila, 2003

Species of lizard

Liolaemus azarai, or Azara's Lizard, is a species of lizard in the family Liolaemidae. The species is native to Argentina and Paraguay.

== Etymology ==
The specific name, azarai, is in honor of Spanish naturalist Félix de Azara.

== Geographic range ==
L. azarai is found in northeastern Argentina (Corrientes Province), and adjacent southern Paraguay (Itapúa Department, Misiones Department).

== Habitat ==
The preferred natural habitat of L. azaai is sand dunes in savanna, at an altitudes around 240 m (around 800 ft).

== Behavior ==
L. azarai is terrestrial.

== Diet ==
L. azarai preys upon insects.

== Reproduction ==
L. azarai is oviparous.
