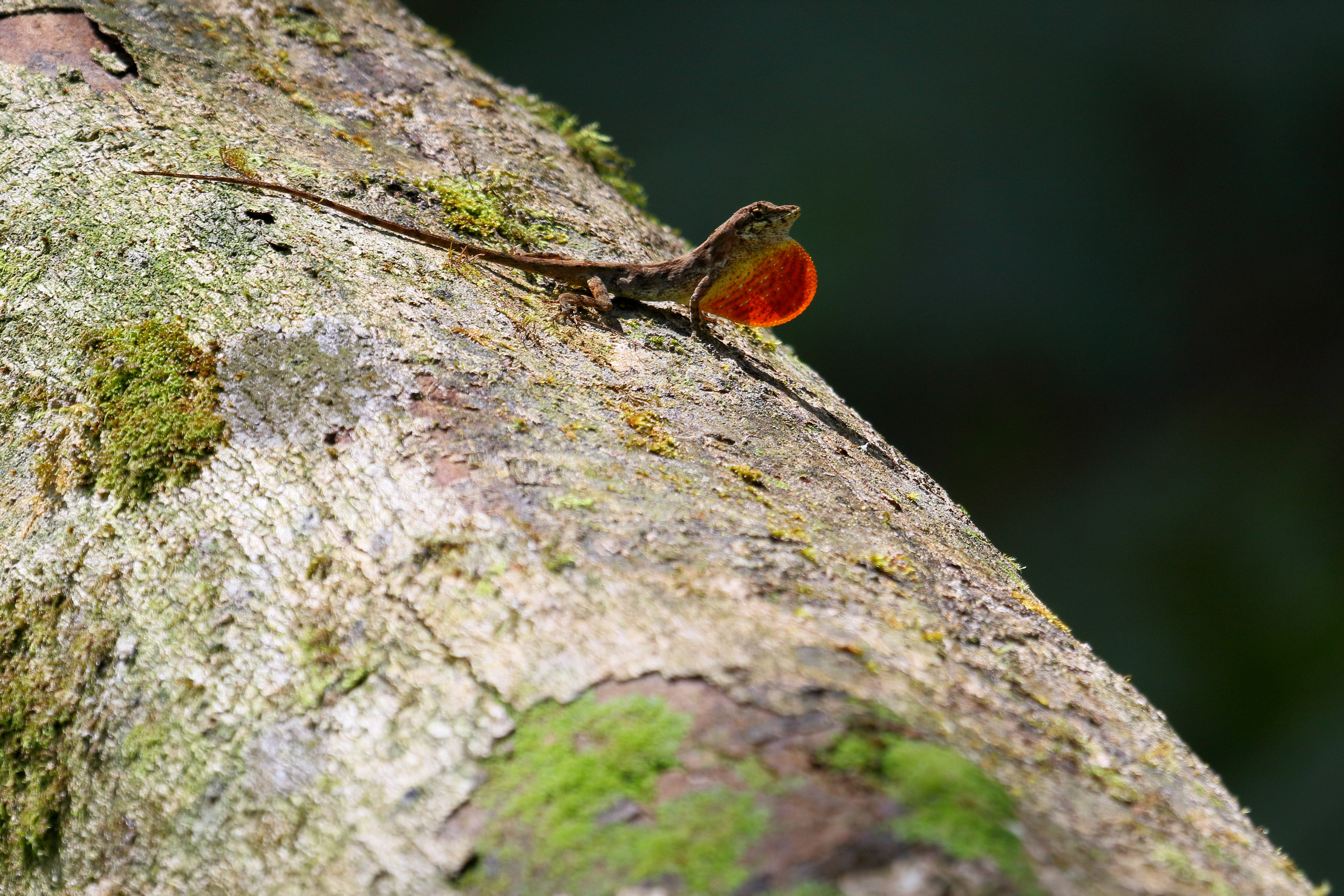

Conservation status
- Critically Endangered (IUCN 3.1)

Scientific classification
- Kingdom: Animalia
- Phylum: Chordata
- Class: Reptilia
- Order: Squamata
- Suborder: Iguania
- Family: Dactyloidae
- Genus: Anolis
- Species: A. monteverde

Binomial name
- Anolis monteverde Köhler, 2009

= Anolis monteverde =

Species of lizard

Anolis monteverde is a species of lizard in the family Dactyloidae. The species is endemic to Costa Rica and only known from the Tilarán Mountains, Puntarenas Province, at elevations of 1,545–1,650 m (5,069–5,413 ft) above sea level.
