= Anolis tenorioensis =

Scientific classification
- Kingdom: Animalia
- Phylum: Chordata
- Class: Reptilia
- Order: Squamata
- Suborder: Iguania
- Family: Dactyloidae
- Genus: Anolis
- Species: A. tenorioensis

Binomial name
- Anolis tenorioensis Köhler, 2011

Species of lizard

Anolis tenorioensis is a species of lizard in the family Dactyloidae. The species is found in Costa Rica.
