= Omoadiphas texiguatensis =

Conservation status
- Critically Endangered (IUCN 3.1)

Scientific classification
- Kingdom: Animalia
- Phylum: Chordata
- Class: Reptilia
- Order: Squamata
- Suborder: Serpentes
- Family: Colubridae
- Genus: Omoadiphas
- Species: O. texiguatensis

Binomial name
- Omoadiphas texiguatensis McCranie & Castañeda, 2004

Species of snake

Omoadiphas texiguatensis is a species of snake in the family Dipsadidae.

It is found in the mountain range Cordillera Nombre de Dios of Yoro Department, Honduras.

== Original publications ==
- McCranie & Castañeda, 2004 : A new species of snake of the genus Omoadiphas (Reptilia: Squamata: Colubridae) from the Cordillera Nombre de Dios in northern Honduras. Proceedings of the Biological Society of Washington, vol. 117, No. 3, p. 311-316 (archive).
