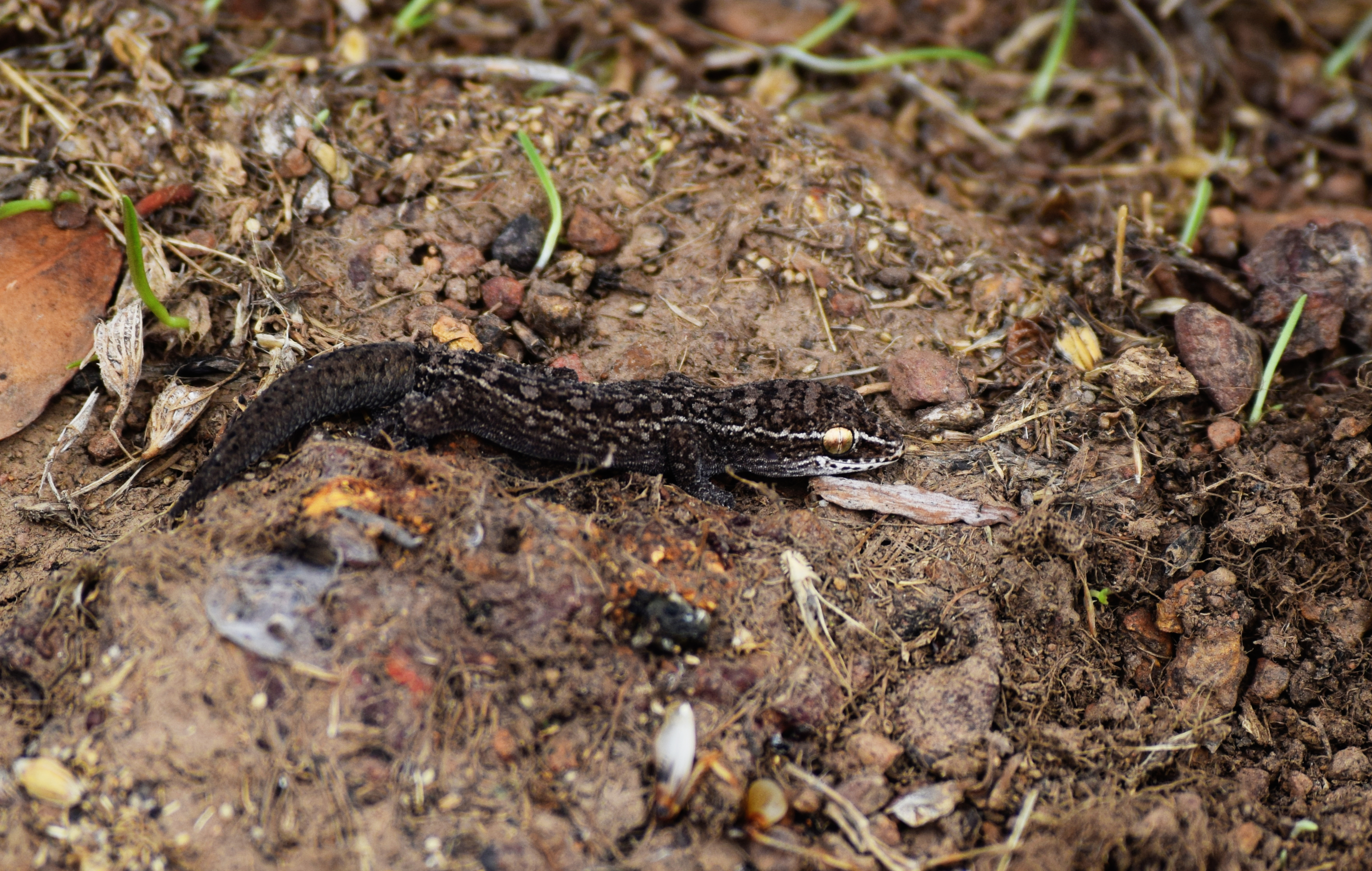

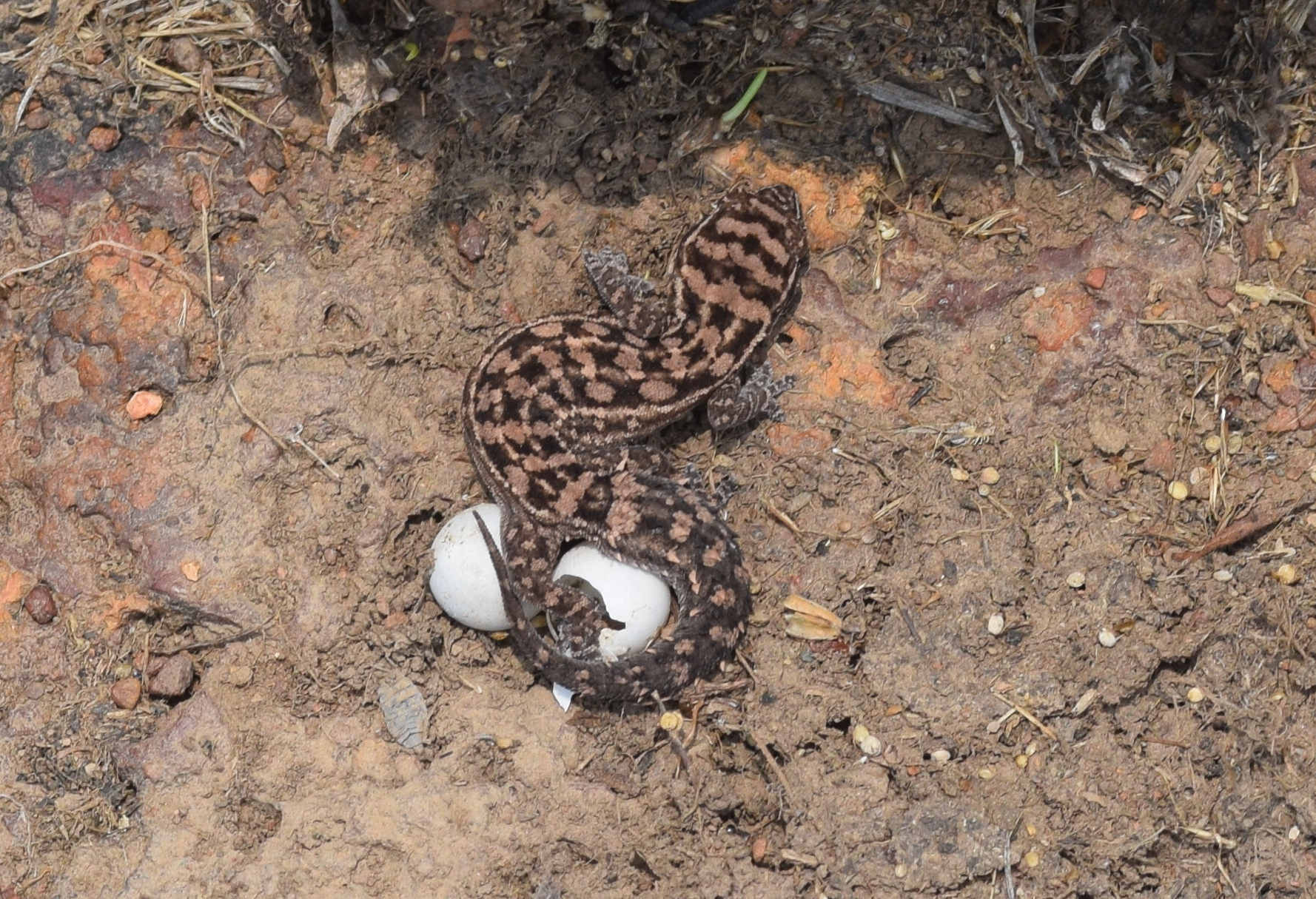

Conservation status
- Critically Endangered (IUCN 3.1)

Scientific classification
- Kingdom: Animalia
- Phylum: Chordata
- Order: Squamata
- Suborder: Gekkota
- Family: Gekkonidae
- Genus: Hemidactylus
- Species: H. sataraensis

Binomial name
- Hemidactylus sataraensis Giri & Bauer, 2008

= Satara gecko =

Species of lizard

The Satara gecko (Hemidactylus sataraensis) is a species of gecko. It is endemic to the Western Ghats, India. The species was described in 2008, from Chalkewadi in Maharashtra. The habitat is lateritic rock outcrop, characterized by extreme climatic conditions during monsoon and summer periods in the Western India. They are mostly found under boulders, in a landscape mostly dominated by windmills, and tourism activities.

The individuals are known to retain their ‘S’-shaped body posture. Other species occurring in the habitat are Hemidactylus cf. brookii, Echis carinatus, Sarada superba, and many predatory arthropods including spiders, scorpions, and centipedes. It is estimated that the species breed more than once per year, and many morphological and behavioral characters are similar to the sister species Hemidactylus albofasciatus. The species is different from Hemidactylus albofasciatus by ecological parameters such as elevation. Morphologically it can be distinguished by the large size and a set of specific scale patterns and colors.

Assessments by IUCN has shown the species is on decline due to rock extraction, wind farm development, fragmentation by roads, and potentially also, climate change.
