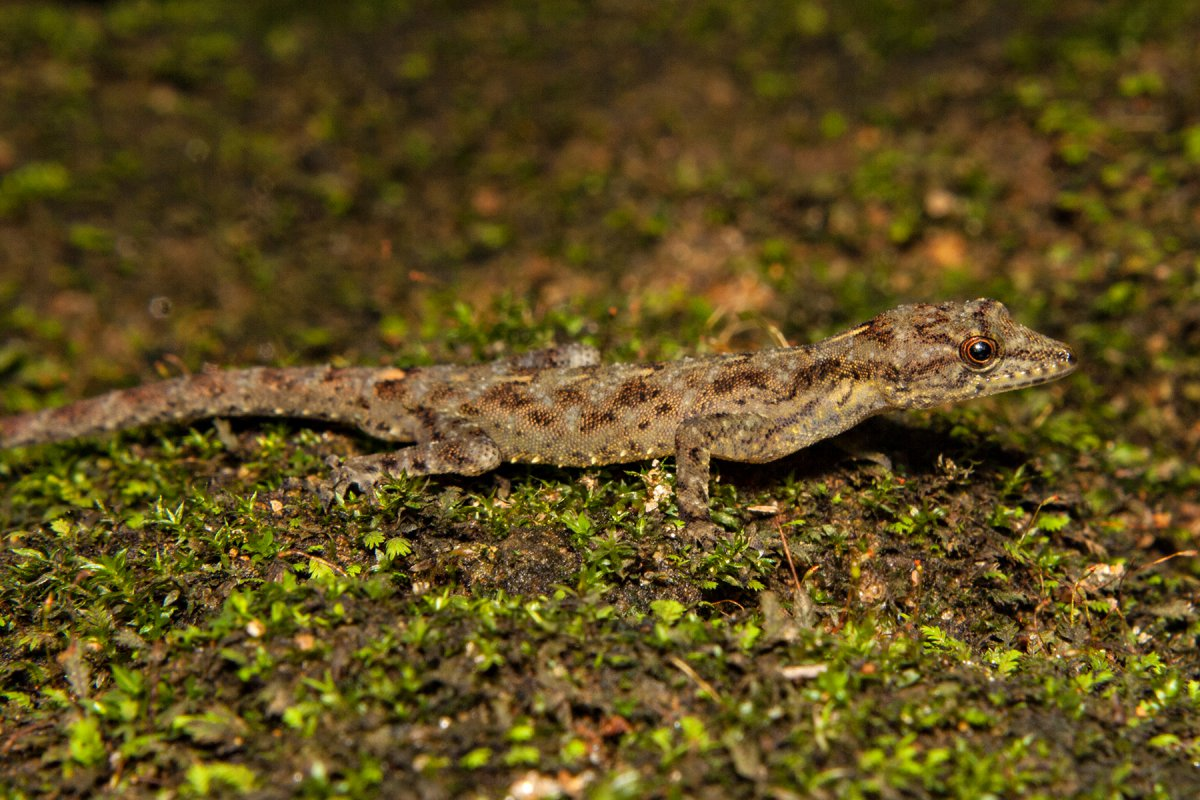

Conservation status
- Least Concern (IUCN 3.1)

Scientific classification
- Kingdom: Animalia
- Phylum: Chordata
- Class: Reptilia
- Order: Squamata
- Suborder: Gekkota
- Family: Gekkonidae
- Genus: Cnemaspis
- Species: C. gracilis

Binomial name
- Cnemaspis gracilis (Beddome, 1870)

Synonyms
- Gymnodactylus gracilis; Gonatodes gracilis

= Cnemaspis gracilis =

Species of lizard

Cnemaspis gracilis, also known as the slender day gecko or graceful day gecko, is a species of gecko endemic to southern India.
