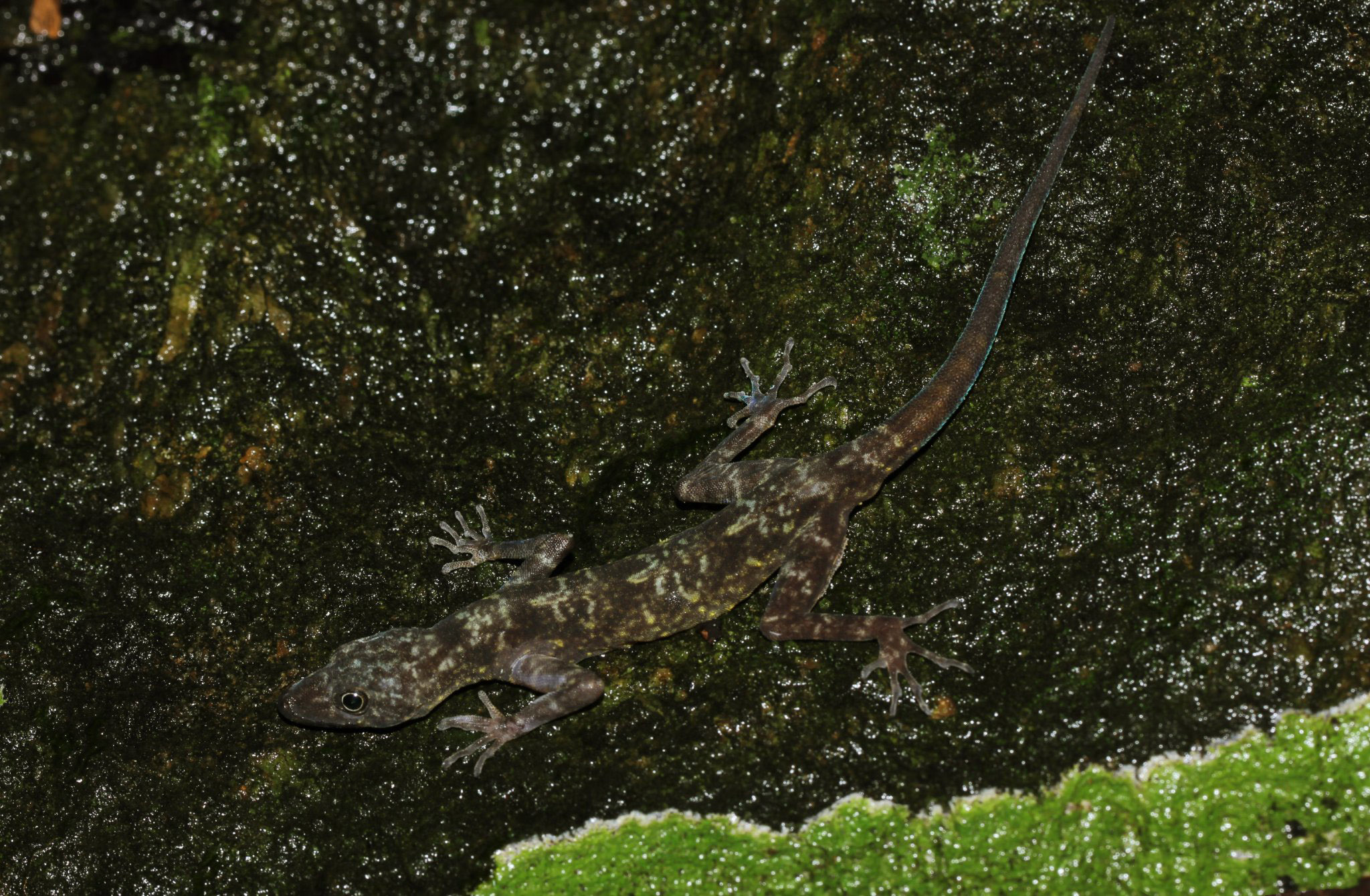

Scientific classification
- Kingdom: Animalia
- Phylum: Chordata
- Class: Reptilia
- Order: Squamata
- Suborder: Gekkota
- Family: Gekkonidae
- Genus: Cnemaspis
- Species: C. rammalensis

Binomial name
- Cnemaspis rammalensis Vidanapathirana, Gehan-Rajeev, Wickramasinghe & Mendis-Wickramasinghe, 2014

= Cnemaspis rammalensis =

Species of lizard

Cnemaspis rammalensis, also known as the Rammale day gecko, is a species of gecko endemic to Sri Lanka.

== Description ==
It is the largest species of day gecko recorded from Sri Lanka with snout-vent length of 52–54 mm. Precloacal pores absent. There are five prominent trilobate shaped creamy markings.

Scalation: ventrals 186–207. 15 femoral pores on each side. 22–23 and 23–25 subdigital lamellae.

== Habitat ==
It is a rock dwelling species. Type locality is Rammalakanda Forest. Populations are decreased due to heavy deforestation.
