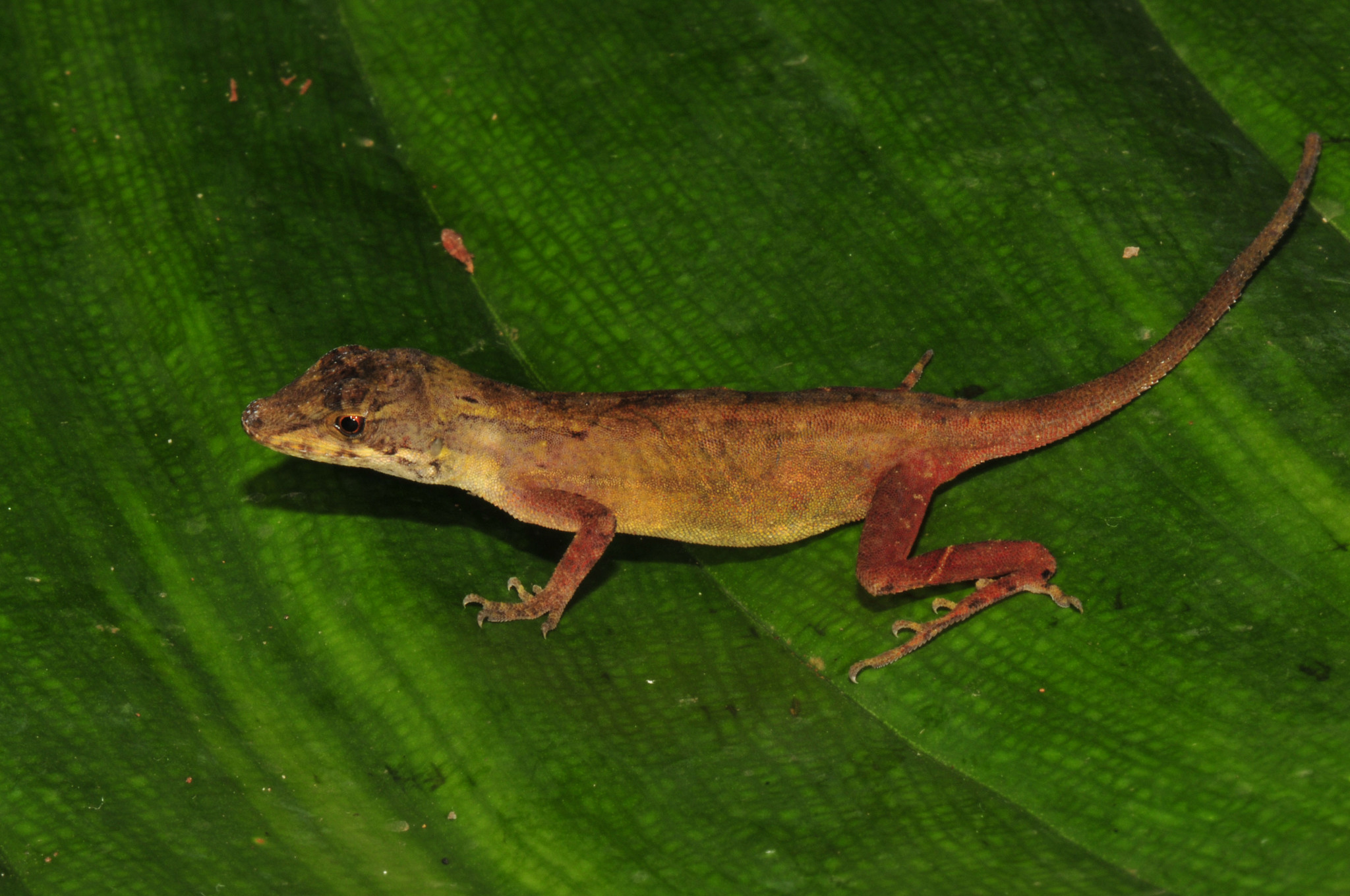

Conservation status
- Critically Endangered (IUCN 3.1)

Scientific classification
- Kingdom: Animalia
- Phylum: Chordata
- Class: Reptilia
- Order: Squamata
- Suborder: Iguania
- Family: Anolidae
- Genus: Anolis
- Species: A. cusuco

Binomial name
- Anolis cusuco (McCranie, Köhler, & Wilson, 2000)

= Anolis cusuco =

Species of lizard

Anolis cusuco is a species of lizard in the family Dactyloidae. The species is found in Honduras.
