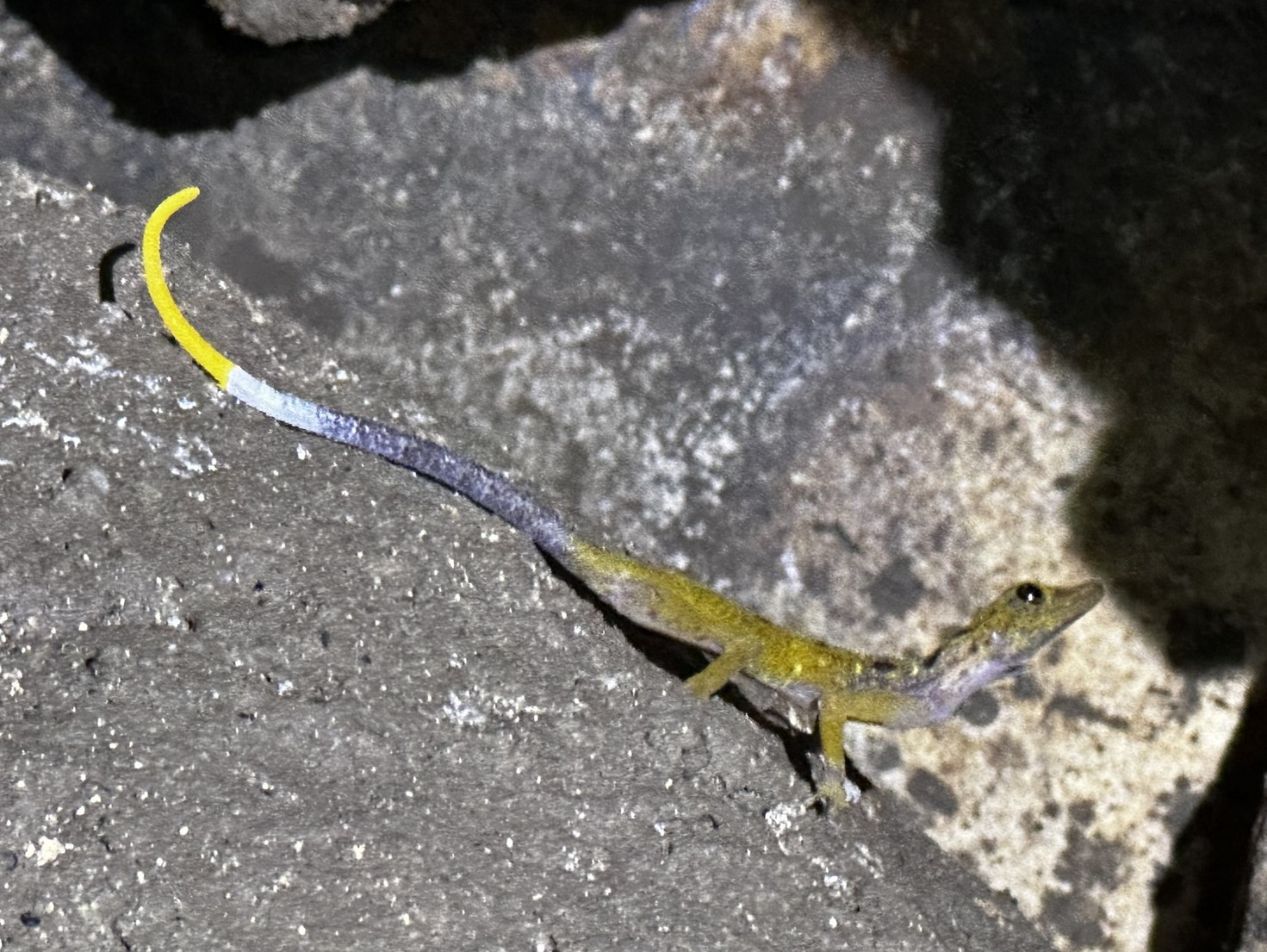

Scientific classification
- Kingdom: Animalia
- Phylum: Chordata
- Class: Reptilia
- Order: Squamata
- Suborder: Gekkota
- Family: Gekkonidae
- Genus: Cnemaspis
- Species: C. paripari

Binomial name
- Cnemaspis paripari Grismer & Onn, 2009

= Cnemaspis paripari =

Species of lizard

Cnemaspis paripari, also known as the fairy rock gecko, is a species of gecko endemic to Sarawak in Borneo.
