= Liolaemus cuyumhue =

Conservation status
- Critically Endangered (IUCN 3.1)

Scientific classification
- Kingdom: Animalia
- Phylum: Chordata
- Class: Reptilia
- Order: Squamata
- Suborder: Iguania
- Family: Liolaemidae
- Genus: Liolaemus
- Species: L. cuyumhue

Binomial name
- Liolaemus cuyumhue Avila, Morando, Perez, & Sites, 2009

Species of lizard

Liolaemus cuyumhue is a species of lizard in the family Liolaemidae. It is native to Argentina.
