= Emmochliophis miops =

Conservation status
- Critically Endangered (IUCN 3.1)

Scientific classification
- Domain: Eukaryota
- Kingdom: Animalia
- Phylum: Chordata
- Class: Reptilia
- Order: Squamata
- Suborder: Serpentes
- Family: Colubridae
- Genus: Emmochliophis
- Species: E. miops

Binomial name
- Emmochliophis miops (Boulenger, 1898)

Species of snake

Emmochliophis miops is a species of snake of the family Colubridae. The species is found in Ecuador and Colombia. Emmochilophis miops was thought to be extinct before two individuals were found in 2017.
