= Cnemaspis adii =

Conservation status
- Critically Endangered (IUCN 3.1)

Scientific classification
- Kingdom: Animalia
- Phylum: Chordata
- Class: Reptilia
- Order: Squamata
- Suborder: Gekkota
- Family: Gekkonidae
- Genus: Cnemaspis
- Species: C. adii

Binomial name
- Cnemaspis adii Srinivasulu, Kumar, and Srinivasulu, 2015

Species of lizard

Cnemaspis adii, also known as Adi's day gecko, is a species of day gecko endemic to Hampi, India. The species was discovered in 2015 by Aditya Srinivasulu and his colleagues in the temple complex.

== Description ==
Cnemaspis adii is a medium-sized Cnemaspis species with a snout to vent length of 31.7 to 34.9 millimetres (1.25 to 1.37 in). It has a long, rigid tail. The gecko has small, granular scales on its dorsal side and smooth, overlapping scales on the ventral side. It has approximately 22 to 26 ventral scales. C. adii has a slightly triangular mental scale and two pairs of postmental scales. Unlike most day gecko species, it does not have any spine-like protrusions from its sides. C. adii has round eyes and is brown to reddish-brown in colour.

C. adii lives between Eastern and Western Ghats in the Indian peninsular region. It is the only known species of day gecko to inhabit this area. It is active during the day.

== Discovery ==
Cnemaspis adii was first discovered among the ruins of the World Heritage Site of Hampi in Karnataka, India by a team headed by Bhargavi Srinivasulu, during a 2012 trip to research bats. Subsequently, photos of the species were compared to known geckos and Srinivasulu's team determined it was likely to be a unique species. Three specimens were then collected to verify the conclusion. Together with Chelmala Srinivasulu and G. Chethan Kumar, she published the findings in Zootaxa in April 2015. The specific eponym was chosen to honor Aditya Srinivasulu, their son, an avid wildlife enthusiast and an independent researcher studying conservation biology and mammalian taxonomy.
