= Hypsirhynchus melanichnus =

Conservation status
- Critically endangered, possibly extinct (IUCN 3.1)

Scientific classification
- Kingdom: Animalia
- Phylum: Chordata
- Class: Reptilia
- Order: Squamata
- Suborder: Serpentes
- Family: Colubridae
- Genus: Hypsirhynchus
- Species: H. melanichnus

Binomial name
- Hypsirhynchus melanichnus (Cope, 1862)

Species of snake

Hypsirhynchus melanichnus, the Hispaniolan olive racer or La Vega racer, is a species of snake in the family Colubridae. The species is native to Haiti and the Dominican Republic.

Hypsirhynchus melanichnus, is distinguished from other Caribbean snakes by its specific morphological features, specifically it doesn't have a furrow on the side of its head at the upper border of upper labials. This is not the same as the Alsophis and Borikenophis, snakes that are commonly found in the Caribbean. In addition, H. melanichnus differs in scale count from the generas Ialtris and Magliophis, having 17 midbody scale rows instead of 19 rows. H. melanichnus is also differentiated from the snake Genus Borikenophis in having 102 subcaudals instead of 106-145 subcaudals.
