= Cynisca gansi =

Conservation status
- Critically endangered, possibly extinct (IUCN 3.1)

Scientific classification
- Kingdom: Animalia
- Phylum: Chordata
- Class: Reptilia
- Order: Squamata
- Clade: Amphisbaenia
- Family: Amphisbaenidae
- Genus: Cynisca
- Species: C. gansi

Binomial name
- Cynisca gansi Dunger, 1968

Species of legless lizard

Cynisca gansi is a species of amphisbaenian in the family Amphisbaenidae. The species is endemic to Nigeria.

== Etymology ==
The specific name, gansi, is in honor of American herpetologist Carl Gans.

== Geographic range ==
C. gansi is found in Kwara State, Nigeria.

== Habitat ==
The preferred natural habitat of C. gansi is forest.

== Reproduction ==
C. gansi is oviparous.
