= Liolaemus cranwelli =

Conservation status
- Critically endangered, possibly extinct (IUCN 3.1)

Scientific classification
- Kingdom: Animalia
- Phylum: Chordata
- Class: Reptilia
- Order: Squamata
- Suborder: Iguania
- Family: Liolaemidae
- Genus: Liolaemus
- Species: L. cranwelli

Binomial name
- Liolaemus cranwelli (Donoso-Barros, 1973)

Synonyms
- Pelusaurus cranwelli Donoso-Barros, 1973; Liolaemus cranwelli — Laurent, 1984

Species of lizard

Liolaemus cranwelli, commonly known as Cranwell's tree iguana, is a species of lizard in the family Liolaemidae. The species is native to Bolivia.

== Etymology ==
The specific name, cranwelli, is in honor of Argentinian herpetologist Jorge A. Cranwell.

== Distribution and habitat ==
L. cranwelli is endemic to Santa Cruz Department, Bolivia. The preferred natural habitat of L. cranwelli is savanna, at altitudes of 400–500 m (1,300–1,600 ft).

== Reproduction ==
The mode of reproduction of L. cranwelli is unknown.
