= Saint Croix racer =

Conservation status
- Critically endangered, possibly extinct (IUCN 3.1)

Scientific classification
- Kingdom: Animalia
- Phylum: Chordata
- Class: Reptilia
- Order: Squamata
- Suborder: Serpentes
- Family: Colubridae
- Genus: Borikenophis
- Species: B. sanctaecrucis

Binomial name
- Borikenophis sanctaecrucis (Cope, 1862)

Synonyms
- Alsophis sancticrucis Cope, 1862; Dromicus sanctæ-crucis Boulenger, 1894 (emendation); Alsophis sanctae-crucis — Grant, 1937; Alsophis sanctaecrucis — Schwartz & Henderson, 1991; Borikenophis sanctaecrucis — Hedges, Couloux & Vidal 2009

Species of snake

The Saint Croix racer (Borikenophis sanctaecrucis) is a possibly extinct species of snake in the family Colubridae that is endemic to the island of Saint Croix in the United States Virgin Islands.

== Etymology ==
The specific name, sanctaecrucis, refers to the island of Saint Croix, on which the holotype was collected.

== Description ==
B. sanctaecrucis may attain a snout-to-vent length (SVL) of 102.5 cm (3.36 ft). It has smooth dorsal scales, which are arranged in 17 rows at midbody. The holotype has a total length of 50 in (130 cm), which includes a tail 17 in (43 cm) long. B. sanctaecrucis is oviparous.

== Habitat ==
The preferred natural habitat of B. sanctaerucis is xeric forest.

== Conservation ==
B. sanctaecrucis is feared extinct, as it has not been recorded in over 100 years since the holotype was collected. St. Croix is a densely populated island, and the species is a fairly large snake. If it is extinct, the most probable causes were due to predation from introduced mongooses and deforestation of its habitat. However, recent rediscoveries of other Caribbean reptiles that were also thought extinct bring hope that a small population (probably less than 50 individuals) of B. sanctaecrucis survives somewhere in St. Croix.
