= Cnemaspis thackerayi =

Scientific classification
- Kingdom: Animalia
- Phylum: Chordata
- Class: Reptilia
- Order: Squamata
- Suborder: Gekkota
- Family: Gekkonidae
- Genus: Cnemaspis
- Species: C. thackerayi

Binomial name
- Cnemaspis thackerayi Khandekar, Gaitonde, & Agarwal, 2019

Species of lizard

Cnemaspis thackerayi, also known as Thackeray's dwarf gecko, is a species of gecko endemic to India.

== Etymology ==
The epithet, thackerayi, is in honor of Indian conservationist and wildlife researcher Tejas Thackeray.
