= Cnemaspis shevaroyensis =

Scientific classification
- Kingdom: Animalia
- Phylum: Chordata
- Class: Reptilia
- Order: Squamata
- Suborder: Gekkota
- Family: Gekkonidae
- Genus: Cnemaspis
- Species: C. shevaroyensis

Binomial name
- Cnemaspis shevaroyensis Khandekar, Gaitonde, & Agarwal, 2019

Species of lizard

Cnemaspis shevaroyensis, also known as the Shevaroy dwarf gecko, is a species of gecko endemic to India.
