= Haensch's whorltail iguana =

Conservation status
- Critically Endangered (IUCN 3.1)

Scientific classification
- Kingdom: Animalia
- Phylum: Chordata
- Class: Reptilia
- Order: Squamata
- Suborder: Iguania
- Family: Tropiduridae
- Genus: Stenocercus
- Species: S. haenschi

Binomial name
- Stenocercus haenschi (F. Werner, 1901)

Synonyms
- Liocephalus formosus Boulenger, 1880; Liocephalus haenschi F. Werner, 1901 (nomen substitutum); Ophryoessoides haenschi — Etheridge, 1966; Stenocercus haenschi — Fritts, 1974

Species of lizard

Haensch's whorltail iguana (Stenocercus haenschi) is a species of lizard in the family Tropiduridae. The species is native to Ecuador.

== Geographic range ==
S. haenschi is endemic to Bolívar Province of Ecuador, where it is only known from one locality.

== Habitat ==
The preferred natural habitat of S. haenschi is forest.

== Behavior ==
S. haenschi is arboreal.

== Reproduction ==
S. haenschi is oviparous.

== Conservation status ==
S. haenschi is considered to be critically endangered and possibly extinct.

== Etymology ==
S. haenschi is named in honor of German entomologist Richard Haensch.
