= Calamaria prakkei =

Conservation status
- Critically Endangered (IUCN 3.1)

Scientific classification
- Kingdom: Animalia
- Phylum: Chordata
- Class: Reptilia
- Order: Squamata
- Suborder: Serpentes
- Family: Colubridae
- Genus: Calamaria
- Species: C. prakkei

Binomial name
- Calamaria prakkei Lidth de Jeude, 1893

Species of snake

Calamaria prakkei, Prakke's reed snake, is a species of snake in the family, Colubridae. It is found in Malaysia.
