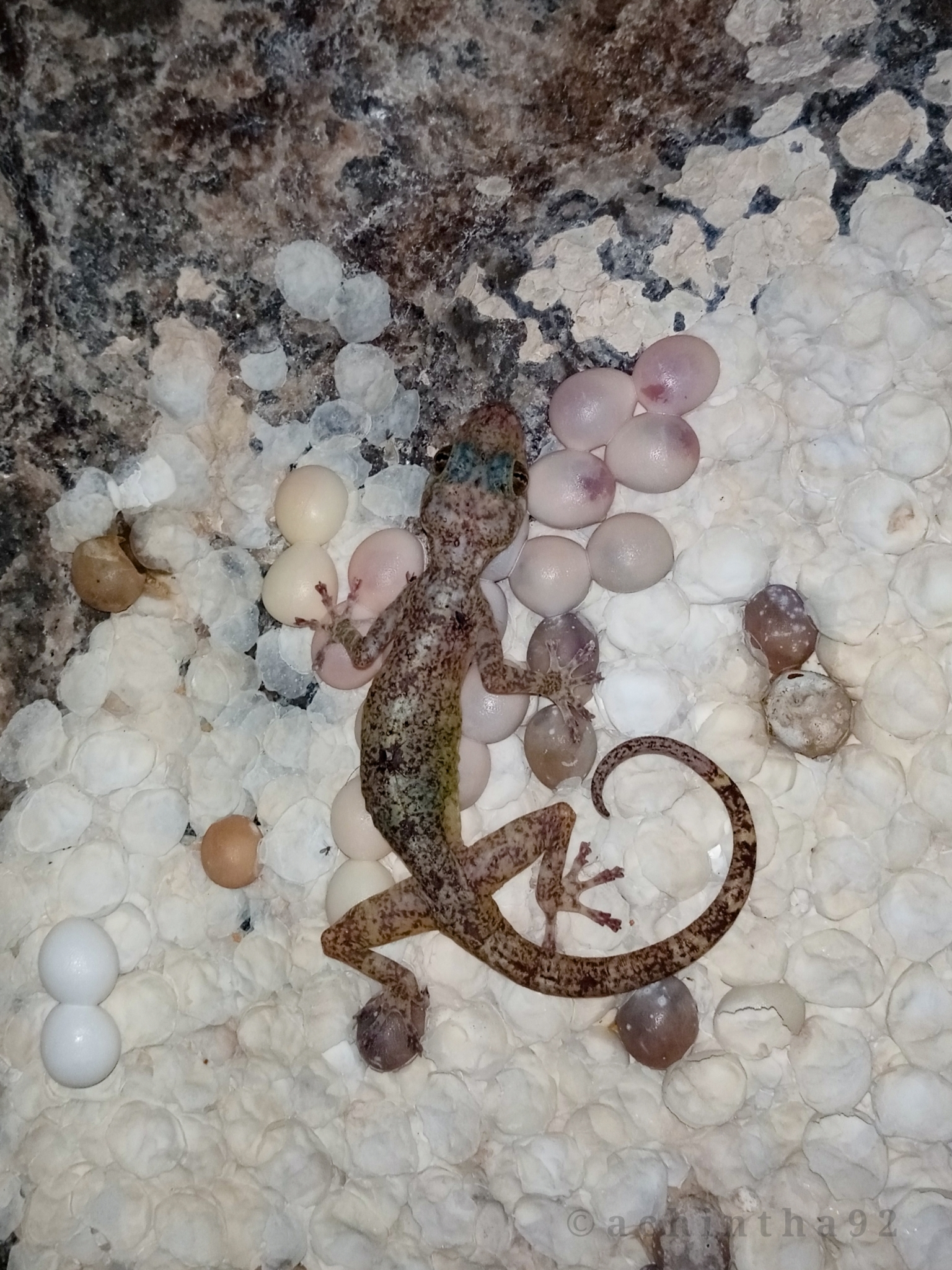

Conservation status
- Vulnerable (IUCN 3.1)

Scientific classification
- Kingdom: Animalia
- Phylum: Chordata
- Class: Reptilia
- Order: Squamata
- Suborder: Gekkota
- Family: Gekkonidae
- Genus: Calodactylodes
- Species: C. illingworthorum

Binomial name
- Calodactylodes illingworthorum Deraniyagala, 1953

Synonyms
- Calodactylodes illingworthi Deraniyagala, 1953; Calodactylodes illingworthorum — Bauer & Das, 2000

= Calodactylodes illingworthorum =

Species of lizard

Calodactylodes illingworthorum is a species of gecko, a lizard in the family Gekkonidae. The species is known only from the island of Sri Lanka. Common names for C. illingworthorum include the golden gecko, Illingworths' gecko, Illingworths' golden gecko, and the Sri Lankan golden gecko.

== Etymology ==
The specific name, illingworthorum, which is genitive plural, is in honor of Margaret and Percy Illingworth.

== Habitat and geographic range ==
A large, rock-dwelling gecko from the dry zone of Sri Lanka, C. illingworthorum is distributed in the monsoon forests of the eastern parts of the country, such as Namadagala, Monaragala, Nilgala, Gal Oya National Park, Buttala, and Ampara.

== Description ==
The head of C. illingworthorum is wider than the body. The pupil of the eye is vertical. There are two pairs of enlarged, nearly rectangular lamellae under each finger and toe. The tail has 27 segments. The dorsum is a yellow-ochre color with dark brown spots. The throat is either bright yellow or orange. The chest and venter are pale gray or yellow. There are 4 pre-anal pores and 4 to 10 femoral pores.

== Ecology and diet ==
C. illingworthorum inhabits rocky biotopes, such as granitic caves within savannah and monsoon forests. A single cave may house up to 50 individuals. Its diet comprises large insects, such as dipterans, coleopterans, their larvae, glow-worms, and other arthropods. Its call uttered throughout the day, and more commonly at dusk, is a harsh, chuckling note. It leaves its rock habitat by dusk to the adjoining vegetation for foraging and returns in the morning.

== Reproduction ==
C. illingworthorum is oviparous. Eggs, measuring 14.9 by 8.2 millimetres (0.59 in × 0.32 in), are produced at communal nesting sites, glued to rock surfaces. Over 100 eggs are produced at a time. Each hatchling measures 27 mm (1.1 in) in total length (including the tail).

== External sources ==
- http://www.bioacoustics.info/article/call-sri-lankan-golden-gecko-calodactylodes-illingworthorum-ecological-parallel-fan-toed
- http://animaldiversity.ummz.umich.edu/accounts/Calodactylodes_illingworthorum/classification/
