= Omoadiphas cannula =

Conservation status
- Critically endangered, possibly extinct (IUCN 3.1)

Scientific classification
- Kingdom: Animalia
- Phylum: Chordata
- Class: Reptilia
- Order: Squamata
- Suborder: Serpentes
- Family: Colubridae
- Genus: Omoadiphas
- Species: O. cannula

Binomial name
- Omoadiphas cannula McCranie & Cruz Díaz, 2010

Species of snake

Omoadiphas cannula is a possibly extinct species of snake in the family Dipsadidae.

It is found in the mountain range Sierra de Agalta of Olancho Department, Honduras.

== Original publications ==
- Mccranie & Cruz-Díaz, 2010 : A third new species of snake of the genus Omoadiphas (Reptilia, Squamata, Colubridae, Dipsadinae) from Honduras. Zootaxa, No. 2690, p. 53–58.
