= Racer =

Racer, The Racer or Racers may refer to:

== Arts and entertainment ==
=== Film and television ===
- Racers (film), a 1972 Soviet drama
- The Racers, 1955 film based on the Hans Ruesch novel
- The Racer (film), a 2020 sports drama
- The Racers, working title for the 1961 TV series Straightaway by Racer Productions
- Race Gurram, 2014 Indian film, released in Hindi as Main Hoon Lucky: The Racer

=== Games and toys ===
- Star Wars Episode I: Racer, a 1999 video game
- Lego Racers, a product line of the Lego construction toy
- Lego Racers (video game), 1999
- Racer (simulator), a freeware video game simulator
- Racer, an alternative name to Speed Race

=== Literature ===
- The Racer, 1953 novel by Hans Ruesch
- "The Racer", 1958 story by Ib Melchior, basis of the 1975 film Death Race 2000
- Racer (magazine), an automobile racing magazine

=== Fictional entities ===
- The Racer family and Racer Motors, a fictional family and company in the Speed Racer universe

=== Roller coasters and slides ===
- West Coast Racers, roller coaster at Six Flags Magic Mountain, U.S.
- Racer (Kennywood), a wooden racing roller coaster at Kennywood Park, U.S.
- The Racer (Kings Island), a wooden racing roller coaster at Kings Island, U.S.
- The Racer, 82m water slide at Big Banana, Coff's Coast, Australia
- Racer, a former Cedar Point attraction, U.S.

== Snakes ==
- Alsophis, endemic to the Lesser Antilles in the Caribbean
- Arrhyton, found in the Caribbean, known as island racers or racerlets
- Eastern racer, Coluber constrictor, endemic to North America and Central America
- Borikenophis, found on the Puerto Rican archipelago and the Virgin Islands
- Cubophis, found in the northwestern Caribbean
- Drymobius, neotropical racers, endemic to the Americas
- Hispaniola racer (Haitiophis anomalus), endemic to Hispaniola
- Hypsirhynchus, found on Jamaica, Hispaniola, and the Bahamas
- Philodryas, green racers, found in South America
- Ialtris, endemic to Hispaniola
- Masticophis, whip snakes or coachwhips, endemic to the Americas
- Galapagos racer (Pseudalsophis biserialis), endemic to the Galapagos Islands

== Sports ==
- The Racer's Group, an American car racing team
- Akron Racers, an American women's softball club
- Elgin Racers, an American basketball team
- Harringay Racers, various British ice hockey clubs
- Harringay Racers (speedway), an English motorcycle speedway team 1947–1954
- Indianapolis Racers, an American hockey team 1974–1978
- London Racers, a British ice hockey club
- Murray State Racers, the sports teams of Murray State University, U.S.
- Murrayfield Racers, a former Scottish ice hockey team
  - Murrayfield Racers (2018)
- Reading Racers, an English motorcycle speedway team
- Tri-City Racers, a former American Basketball Association team

== Transportation ==
=== Aircraft ===
- Hughes H-1 Racer, a racing aircraft first flown in 1935
- AMSOIL Racer, a 1980s racing aircraft
- Bristol Racer, a British racing monoplane, first flown in 1922
- Brown B-1 Racer, an American 1930s racing monoplane
- Brown B-2 Racer, an American racing monoplane built in 1934
- Dayton-Wright RB-1 Racer, an American racing monoplane first flown in 1920
- Graham-Perren Racer, a racing aircraft built to compete in the 1934 National Air Races
- Napier-Heston Racer, a 1940s British racing monoplane
- Powell PH Racer, a 1920s racing aircraft
- Verville-Packard R-1, a military racing aircraft first flown in 1919
- Verville-Sperry R-3, a racing monoplane first flown in 1922
- Westland Racer, a British racing monoplane first flown in 1926
- Air Creation Racer, a French ultralight trike design 1986–2010
- Apollo Racer GT, a Hungarian ultralight trike design
- Corvus Racer 540, a Hungarian high performance aerobatic aircraft
- Airbus RACER, a 2017 experimental high-speed compound helicopter

=== Ships ===
- HMS Racer, the name of several Royal Navy ships
  - Racer-class sloop
- USS Racer, the name of two US Navy ships
- Racer, later HMS Shelburne (1813)

=== Other transportation ===
- Daewoo Racer, a variant of the Daewoo LeMans compact car
- Racer, original name of GWR 3031 Class locomotive Glenside

== Other uses ==
- LZR Racer, a line of Speedo swimsuits
- ZTE Racer, a mobile phone
- RACER Trust, to dispose of General Motors' abandoned real estate

== See also ==
- Racing (disambiguation)
- Racer X (disambiguation)
- RACER IV, a component of hydrogen bombs made by the United States
