= Puerto Rican racer =

Puerto Rican racer is a common name which may refer to two species of snake native to Puerto Rico:

- Borikenophis portoricensis, long recognized as a distinct species
- Borikenophis prymnus, recently recognized as a distinct species from B. portoricensis
- Borikenophis variegatus, recently recognized as a distinct species from B. portoricensis
