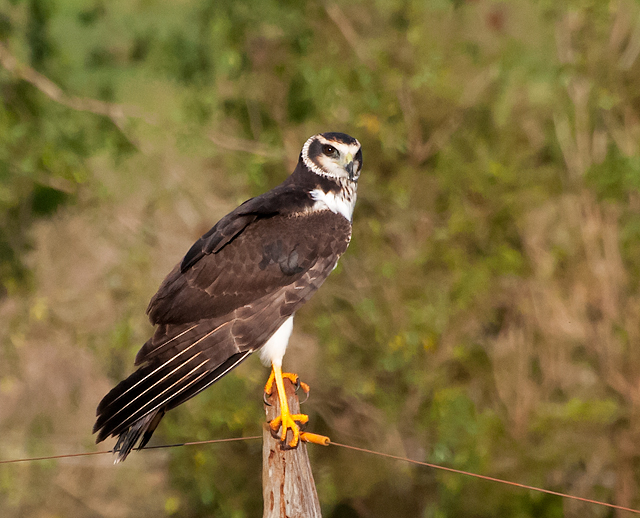

Conservation status
- Least Concern (IUCN 3.1)

Scientific classification
- Kingdom: Animalia
- Phylum: Chordata
- Class: Aves
- Order: Accipitriformes
- Family: Accipitridae
- Genus: Circus
- Species: C. buffoni

Binomial name
- Circus buffoni (Gmelin, JF, 1788)
- Nonbreeding Breeding Year-round

= Long-winged harrier =

Species of bird

The long-winged harrier (Circus buffoni) is a common bird of prey species endemic to South America. They are members of the family Accipitridae, under the genus Circus which encompasses other harrier species. Its range encompasses most of South America, in grassland and wetland all across the continent. The long-winged harrier is a carnivorous bird, and will feed on many different animals found in its habitat. Like owls and other harrier species, the long-winged harrier has a distinctive facial disc, which is used to triangulate the bird's hearing while it is hunting.

The long-winged harrier is classified as a species of least concern by the IUCN Red List, however their population has been observed to decline due to habitat degradation by human activity.

== Taxonomy ==
The long-winged harrier was formally described in 1788 by the German naturalist Johann Friedrich Gmelin in his revised and expanded edition of Carl Linnaeus's Systema Naturae. He placed it with the falcons, eagles and their relatives in the genus Falco and coined the binomial name Falco buffoni. Gmelin based his description on the "Cayenne ringtail" that had been described in 1781 by the English ornithologist John Latham in his multi-volume work A General Synopsis of Birds. Latham had examined a specimen from Cayenne that formed part of a private collection in London. The specimen had been given the title "Duc de Buffon". The long-winged harrier is now one of 16 harriers placed in the genus Circus that was introduced in 1799 by the French naturalist Bernard Germain de Lacépède. The genus name Circus is derived from the Ancient Greek kirkos, referring to a bird of prey named for its circling flight (kirkos, "circle"), probably the hen harrier. The specific epithet buffoni is from the name of the French naturalist, the Comte de Buffon. The long-winged harrier does not have any recognised subspecies.

== Description ==
The long-winged is mid-sized bird of prey, and like most birds of prey species, the females are larger than the males. Males will weigh from 390 to 464 g (13.8 to 16.4 oz) and females will be slightly heavier, ranging from 400 to 645 g (14.1 to 22.8 oz). Their length can range between 46 and 60 cm (18 and 23.5 in) and their wingspan ranges between 120 and 155 cm (47 and 61 in). As other harrier species, the long-winged harrier can be identified by its long and narrow tail and its especially long wings. Their wings and their back are mostly grey, with the primary feathers on the wings being much darker than the rest of the wing feathers, which are streaked with variants of white, grey and brown.

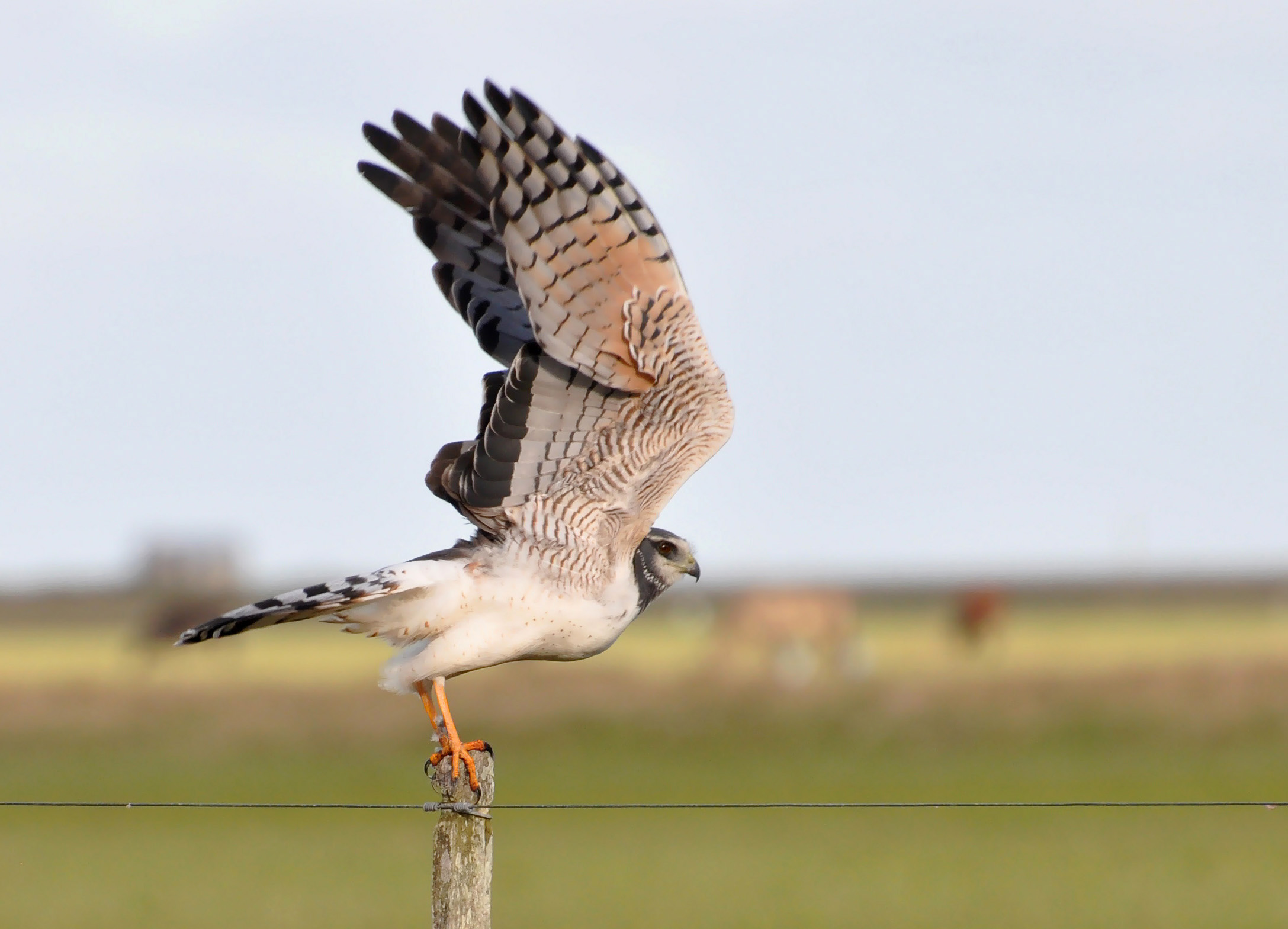
Male long-winged harrier, light morph

The long-winged harrier can harbor 2 different morphs, a dark morph and a light morph. In dark morph individuals, the belly is all black with females having more of a brown undertone. The light morph individuals can be identified by their white underparts, which contrasts heavily with their dark morph counterpart. Juvenile long-winged harriers usually have the same colour patterns as females, but they have a more speckled chest. The long-winged harrier morphologically resembles its close relative, the cinereous harrier (Circus cinereus), which can also be found in South America, but their range rarely overlaps.

As all other birds of prey species, the long-winged harrier possesses sharp talons used to catch their prey on the ground or in the air, and their legs are bright orange. The species also shares the large hooked beak of other birds of prey, which it uses to tear apart meat once it catches its prey.

The long-winged harrier is part of the only diurnal bird of prey group to possess a facial disc. The facial disc is formed by a group of easily recognizable group of feathers that form a disc shape around the bird's face. These feathers can be raised in response to sounds and can improve the bird's hearing when it is hunting by triangulating sounds in its ear holes.

Little is known of the long-winged harrier's vocalization, as is not a very vocal bird. It will call mostly when in flight and some variation of the bird's call include a fast succession of "klee-klee-klee", and a more quiet "thrill" with a quickly descending pitch.

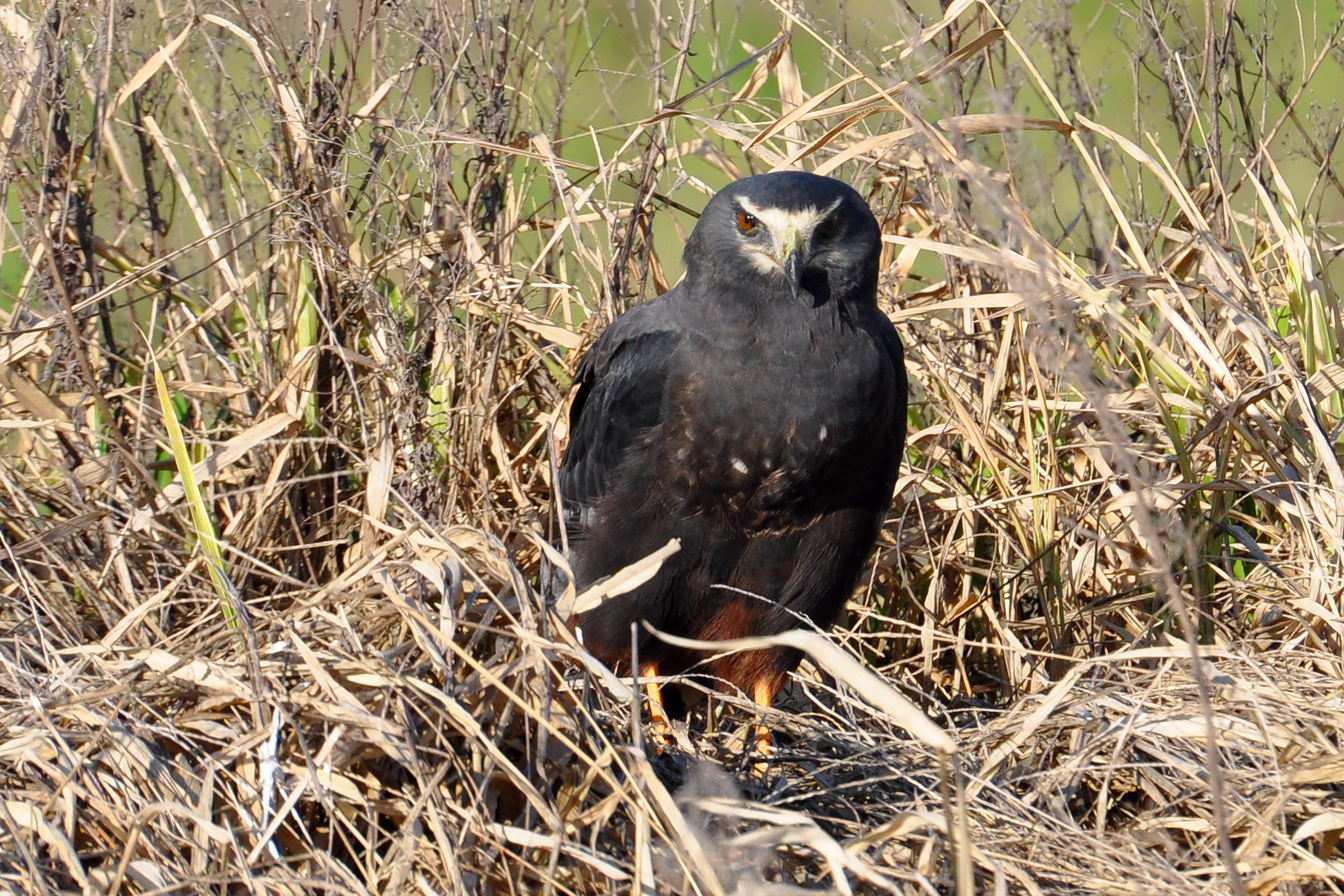
Female long-winged harrier, dark morph

== Distribution and habitat ==
The long-winged harrier's year-round range encompasses most of eastern South America, including eastern Argentina, Uruguay, Brazil and Paraguay, and extends up to Colombia, Venezuela, and the northern tips of Guyana, Suriname and French Guiana. The species has also been observed occasionally in extant areas such as Bolivia, Peru, Chile, Trinidad and Tobago, and all the way down to Tierra del Fuego in southern Argentina. It is vagrant to Panama and the Falkland Islands.

This species occupies large grasslands and agricultural fields, where their wide-range active hunting technique is very effective. Their habitat also includes savanna, marshes and wetlands of South America.

== Behavior and ecology ==
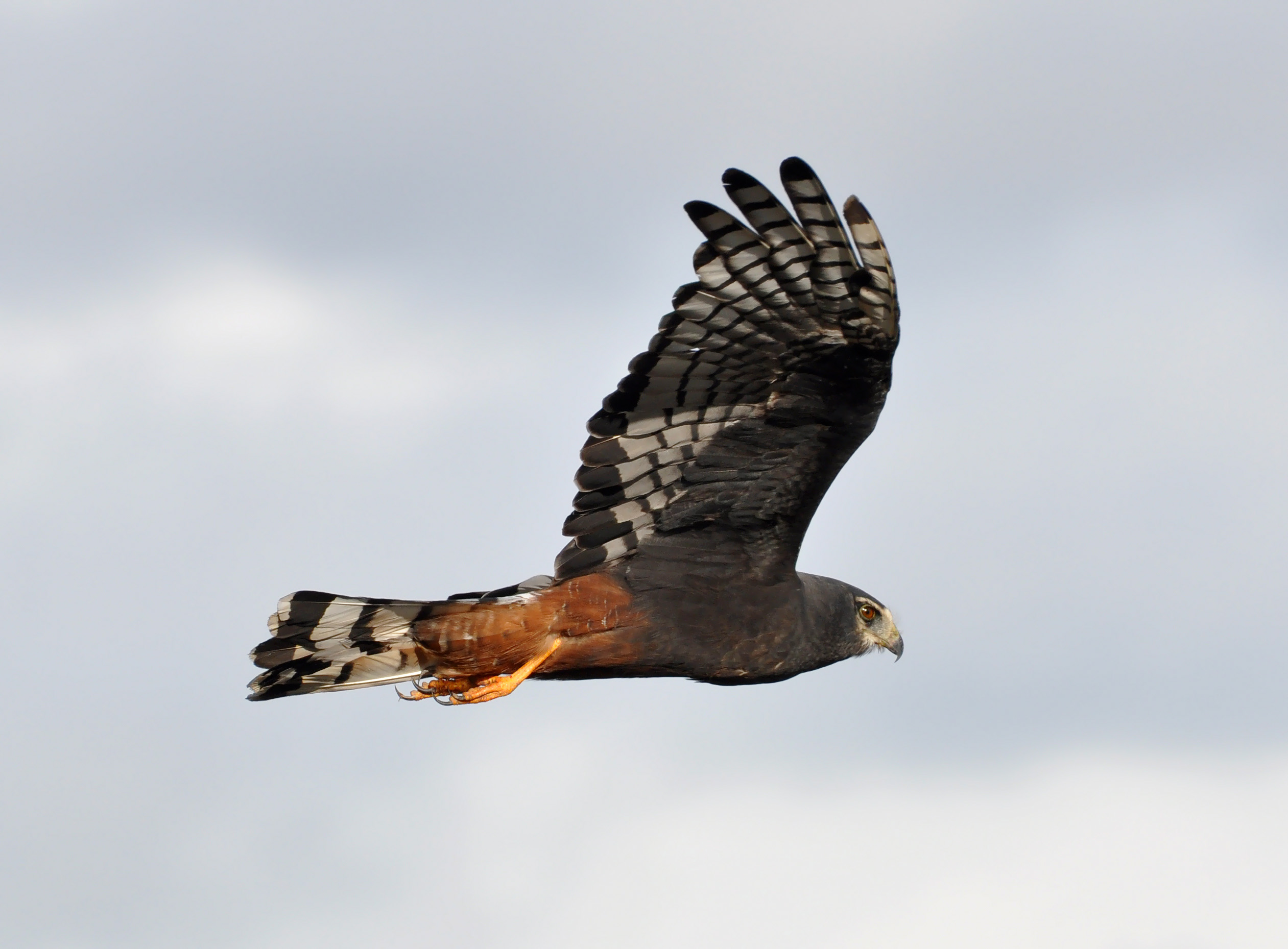
Male long-winged harrier, dark morph

=== Food and feeding ===
As all of the extended members of the family Accipitridae, the long-winged harrier is carnivorous, feeding on a large variety of animals due to its widespread distribution. Their diet includes small mammals (such as cavies), amphibians (such as frogs), reptiles (such as lizards) and birds (such as crakes and young coots), with birds consisting the majority of their food intake. It will also feed on bird eggs, varying from taking the whole ball-nests of water-tyrants to raiding heronries. Its hunting strategy differs vastly from other hawks sharing the same habitat such as the roadside hawk (Rupornis magnirostris). Instead of opting for a passive hunting strategy consisting of the use of high perches to locate their prey, the long-winged harrier will fly slowly in large circles above its range in order to find its prey, using its keen vision and hearing.

=== Breeding ===
The long-winged harrier nests on the ground, building its nest between September and October in the grasslands of its habitat. The nests are usually made out of rushes and grass, and are built no more than 3 meters up the ground and no less than 1 meter away from bodies of water. Their breeding season can vary vastly across their range, but it will usually take place in the summer months (September to January). During their reproduction cycle, the nests will usually hold between 3 and 4 eggs per clutch.

== Conservation ==
Although the species population has been found to be declining, the extended range of the long-winged harrier allows it to be classified as a species of 'least concern' by the IUCN Red List. Their population decline has been attributed to the degradation of its habitat, most notably wetlands, due to drainage, pollution, and other human-caused circumstances. No conservation efforts are currently in action concerning the long-winged harrier as an individual species, but their range occurs in a wide variety of conservation sites and protected areas.
