= Water tyrant =

Water tyrants are birds in the following genera:

- Fluvicola
- Ochthornis
