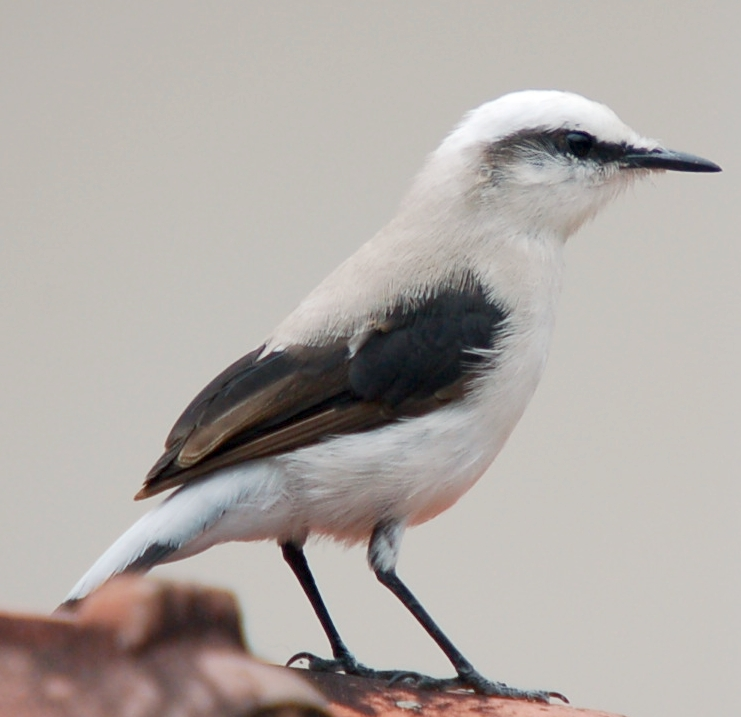

Conservation status
- Least Concern (IUCN 3.1)

Scientific classification
- Kingdom: Animalia
- Phylum: Chordata
- Class: Aves
- Order: Passeriformes
- Family: Tyrannidae
- Genus: Fluvicola
- Species: F. nengeta

Binomial name
- Fluvicola nengeta (Linnaeus, 1766)

Synonyms
- See text

= Masked water tyrant =

Species of bird

The masked water tyrant (Fluvicola nengeta) is a species of bird in the family Tyrannidae, the tyrant flycatchers. It is found in Argentina, Brazil, Colombia, Ecuador, Peru, and as a vagrant to Uruguay and Paraguay.

== Taxonomy and systematics ==
The masked water tyrant was formally described in 1766 as Lanius nengeta, erroneously placing it in the shrike family Laniidae. It is now placed in the genus Fluvicola that was introduced by the English naturalist William Swainson in 1827. The genus name is derived from a combination of Latin fluvius meaning "river" and -cola meaning "dweller". Some early twentieth century authors called it Fluvicola climazura.

The masked water tyrant has two subspecies, the nominate F. n. nengeta (Linnaeus, 1766) and F. n. atripennis (Sclater, PL, 1860). Subspecies F. n. atripennis was formally described as a species and some early twenty-first century authors suggest that it again should be treated that way. The masked water tyrant shares genus Fluvicola with the pied water tyrant (F. pica) and the black-backed water tyrant (F. albiventer).

== Description ==
The masked water tyrant is 14.5 to 15 cm (5.7 to 5.9 in) long. The sexes have the same plumage. Adults are mostly white. They have a black stripe through the eye (the eponymous mask), a brownish gray tinge to the back, black wings, and a black tail with white feather tips. They have entirely white underparts. Subspecies F. n. atripennis has blacker wings than the nominate with white fringes on the tertials; the amount of white is variable. Both subspecies have a dark iris, a black bill, and black legs and feet.

== Distribution and habitat ==
The masked water tyrant has a highly disjunct distribution. The nominate subspecies has by far the larger range of the two. It is found mostly in eastern and southern Brazil, from eastern Pará and Tocantins east to Rio Grande do Norte and from there south to Mato Grosso do Sul and Santa Catarina. Its range extends into far northeastern Argentina's Misiones Province and it has been recorded as a vagrant in Paraguay and Uruguay. Subspecies F. n. atripennis is found from extreme southwestern Colombia's Nariño Department south through western Ecuador slightly into far northwestern Peru's Tumbes Department.

The masked water tyrant inhabits somewhat open shrublands near freshwater bodies, and especially favors marshy areas and rice fields. It also occurs on the banks of ponds, lakes, streams, and rivers and occasionally is found in nearby open grasslands. It has increasingly been found in urban and suburban parks in Brazil. The nominate subspecies occurs mostly at elevations from sea level to about 300 m (1,000 ft) but occasionally much higher. Subspecies F. n. atripennis mostly occurs below 800 m (2,600 ft) in Ecuador.

== Behavior ==
=== Movement ===
The masked water tyrant is a year-round resident throughout its two ranges.

=== Feeding ===
The masked water tyrant feeds on insects. It usually forages singly or in pairs and tends to be tame and conspicuous. It usually forages near or on the ground and on floating and emergent vegetation. It captures prey with short sallies, quick runs, and upward leaps.

=== Breeding ===
The masked water tyrant's breeding season is not known. Pairs display to each other, raising, spreading, and bobbing their tails up and down. Males also sometimes fan their tail and spread their wings. The species' nest is a ball made from grass and stems with a side entrance. The clutch is three eggs that are white with brown spots. The female alone incubates the clutch, for about 15 days. Both parents provision nestlings. The time to fledging and other details of parental care are not known.

=== Vocalization ===
The masked water tyrant's call in Brazil is a "high, sharp peep". In Ecuador it is described as "a distinctive sharp kirt!" that is sometimes doubled and often given in flight. "Pairs sometimes chatter together." The species' song is "a repeated, soft dewdelewdel-dewdel".

== Status ==
The IUCN has assessed the masked water tyrant as being of Least Concern. It has a large range; its population size is not known and is believed to be increasing. No immediate threats have been identified. It is considered fairly common and both subspecies appear to be increasing their ranges. The nominate's range is expanding southward in Brazil as forest is cleared. It is established in Argentina in addition to its appearances in Paraguay and Uruguay. The first record in Colombia was in 2011. It is "[t]olerant of converted habitat and has [a] relatively large range, within which it occurs in many national parks and other protected areas".

== Gallery ==
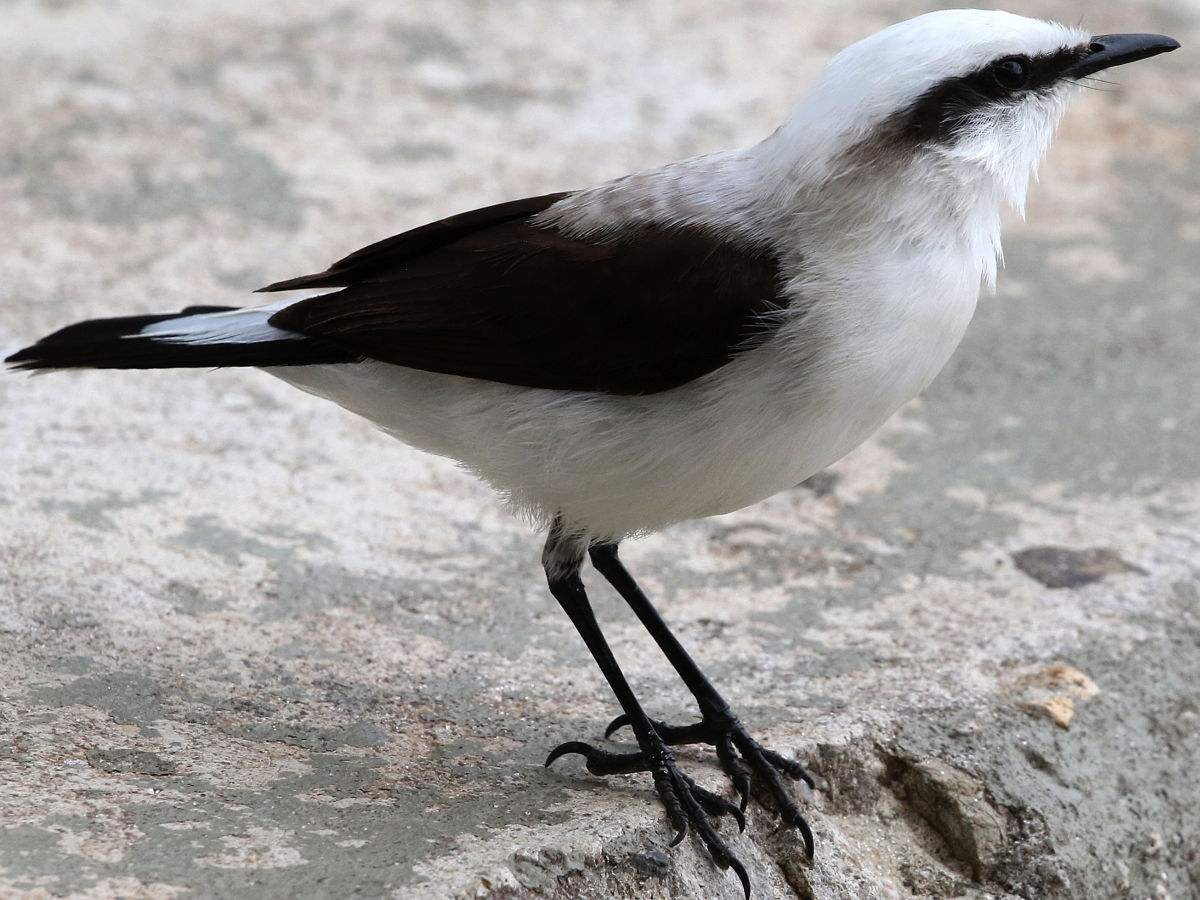
Copacabana, Rio de Janeiro

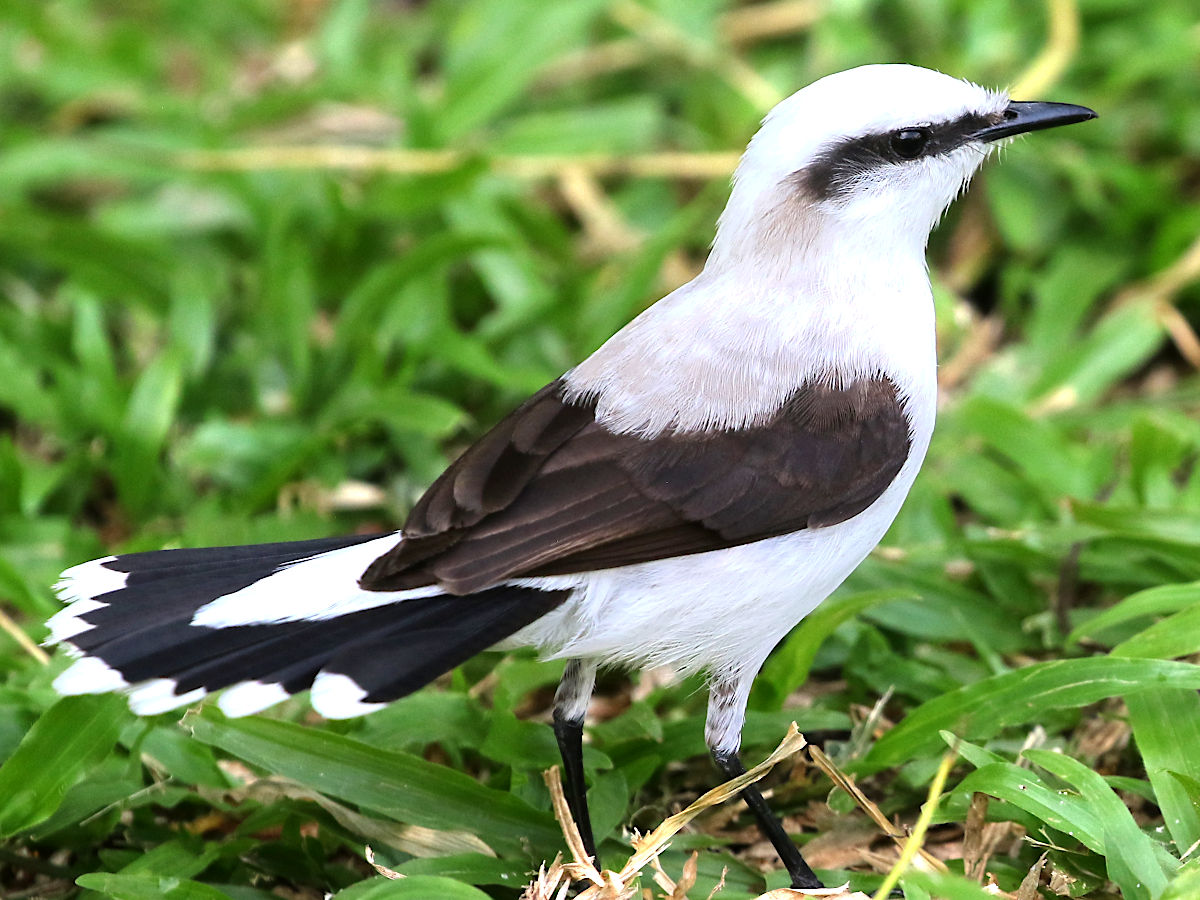
Forte Duque de Caxias
