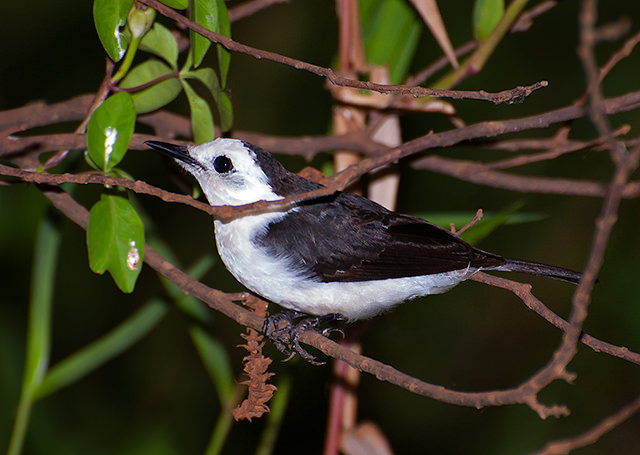

Conservation status
- Least Concern (IUCN 3.1)

Scientific classification
- Kingdom: Animalia
- Phylum: Chordata
- Class: Aves
- Order: Passeriformes
- Family: Tyrannidae
- Genus: Fluvicola
- Species: F. albiventer

Binomial name
- Fluvicola albiventer (Spix, 1825)
- Year-round Non-Breeding

= Black-backed water tyrant =

Species of bird

The black-backed water tyrant (Fluvicola albiventer) is a species of bird in the family Tyrannidae, the tyrant flycatchers. It is found in Argentina, Bolivia, Brazil, Paraguay, Peru, and Uruguay.

== Taxonomy and systematics ==
The black-backed water tyrant was formally described in 1825 as Muscicapa albiventer, erroneously placing it in the Old World flycatcher family. For much of the twentieth century it was treated as a subspecies of the pied water tyrant (F. pica). It now shares genus Fluvicola with the pied water tyrant and the masked water tyrant (F. nengeta).

The black-backed water tyrant is monotypic.

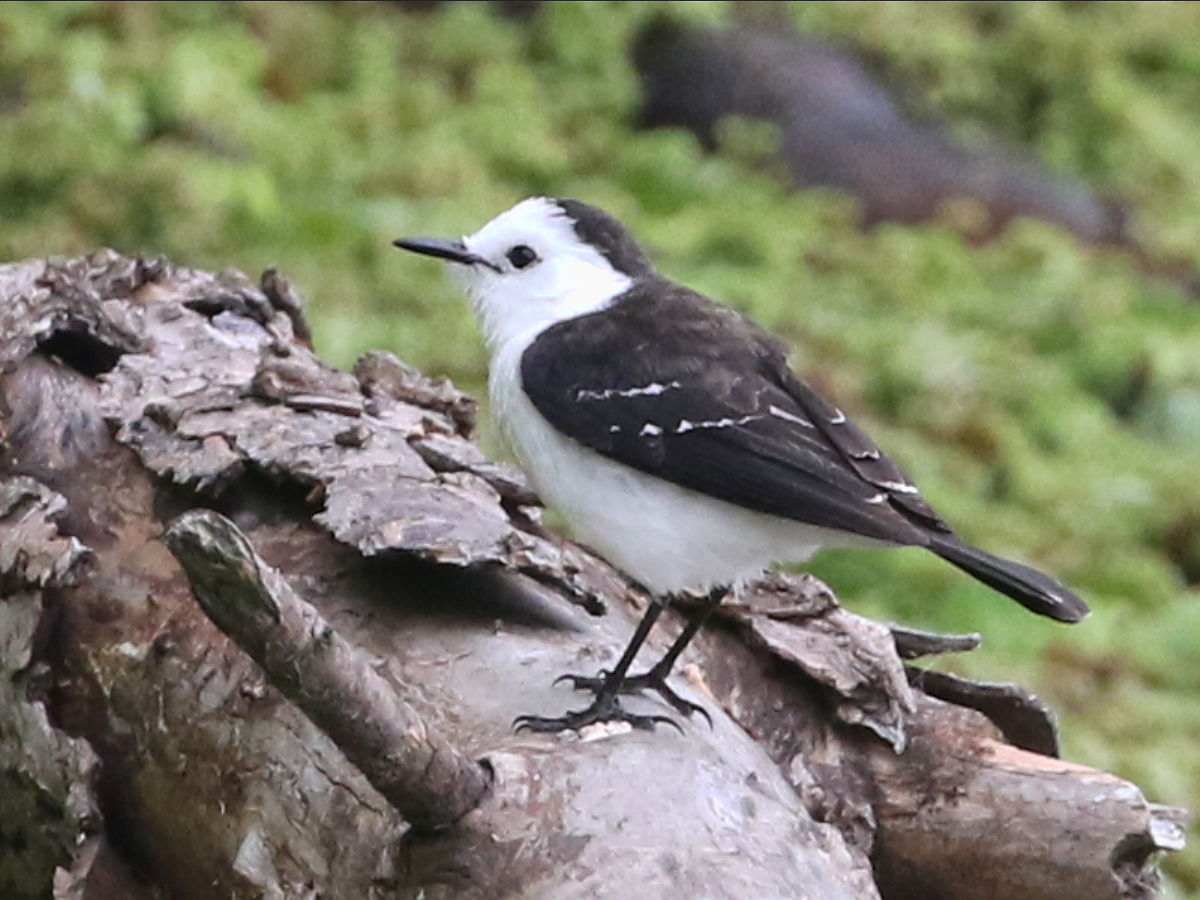
Costanera Sur, Argentina

== Description ==
The black-backed water tyrant is a medium-sized flycatcher, 13 to 14 cm (5.1 to 5.5 in) long. The sexes have the same plumage. Adults are mostly white. They have a black hindcrown and nape, a black back with a thin white band across the rump, black wings with two thin white wing bars, and a black tail with variable white tips and edges on the feathers. They have entirely white underparts. They have a dark iris, a black bill, and black legs and feet.

== Distribution and habitat ==
The black-backed water tyrant is found along the length of eastern Peru and south through eastern Bolivia and western Paraguay to western Uruguay and Argentina as far south as Buenos Aires Province. Its range in Brazil is roughly bounded clockwise by west-central Amazonas, Amapá, east-central Bahia, western São Paulo State, and Mato Grosso do Sul. It inhabits marshes and shrubby areas bordering watercourses and oxbow lakes. In elevation it ranges from sea level to about 1,000 m (3,300 ft).

== Behavior ==
=== Movement ===
The black-backed water tyrant is a partial migrant. It does not entirely vacate its breeding area but individuals move west and north from it into western Brazil, northern Bolivia, and eastern Peru. One source states that it has occurred as a vagrant in Ecuador but the South American Classification Committee of the American Ornithological Society has no records there.

=== Feeding ===
The black-backed water tyrant feeds on insects. It usually forages near or on the ground and on floating and emergent vegetation. It cocks and fans its tail while foraging.

=== Breeding ===
The black-backed water tyrant's breeding season has not been fully defined but in Argentina spans from October to February. Males perform an aerial courtship display. The species' nest is a ball with a side opening near its top made from small twigs and stems lined with feathers and plant down. It is placed low to the ground or low over water. The clutch is two to three eggs. The incubation period is 12 to 14 days and fledging occurs 10 to 15 days after hatch. Details of parental care are not known. Nests have been parasitized by the shiny cowbird (Molothrus bonariensis).

=== Vocalization ===
The black-backed water tyrant's call is a "high, dry, very short wic".

== Status ==
The IUCN has assessed the black-backed water tyrant as being of Least Concern. It has a very large range; its population size is not known and is believed to be stable. No immediate threats have been identified. It is considered to be uncommon to locally fairly common and occurs in a few protected areas.
