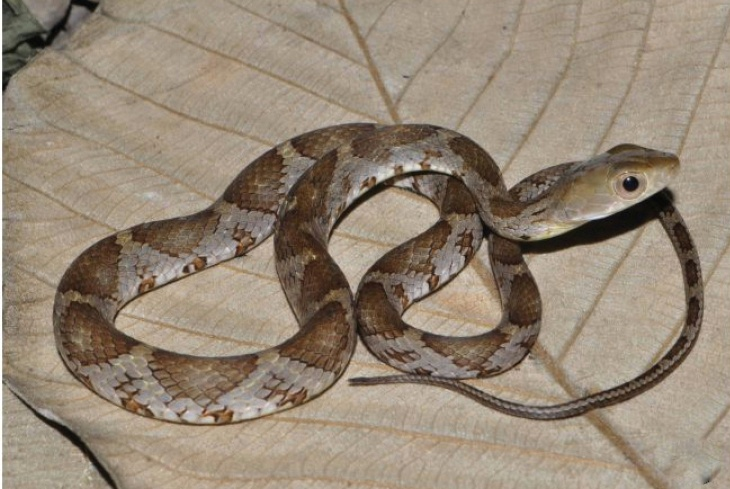

Conservation status
- Least Concern (IUCN 3.1)

Scientific classification
- Kingdom: Animalia
- Phylum: Chordata
- Class: Reptilia
- Order: Squamata
- Suborder: Serpentes
- Family: Colubridae
- Genus: Drymobius
- Species: D. rhombifer

Binomial name
- Drymobius rhombifer (Günther, 1860)
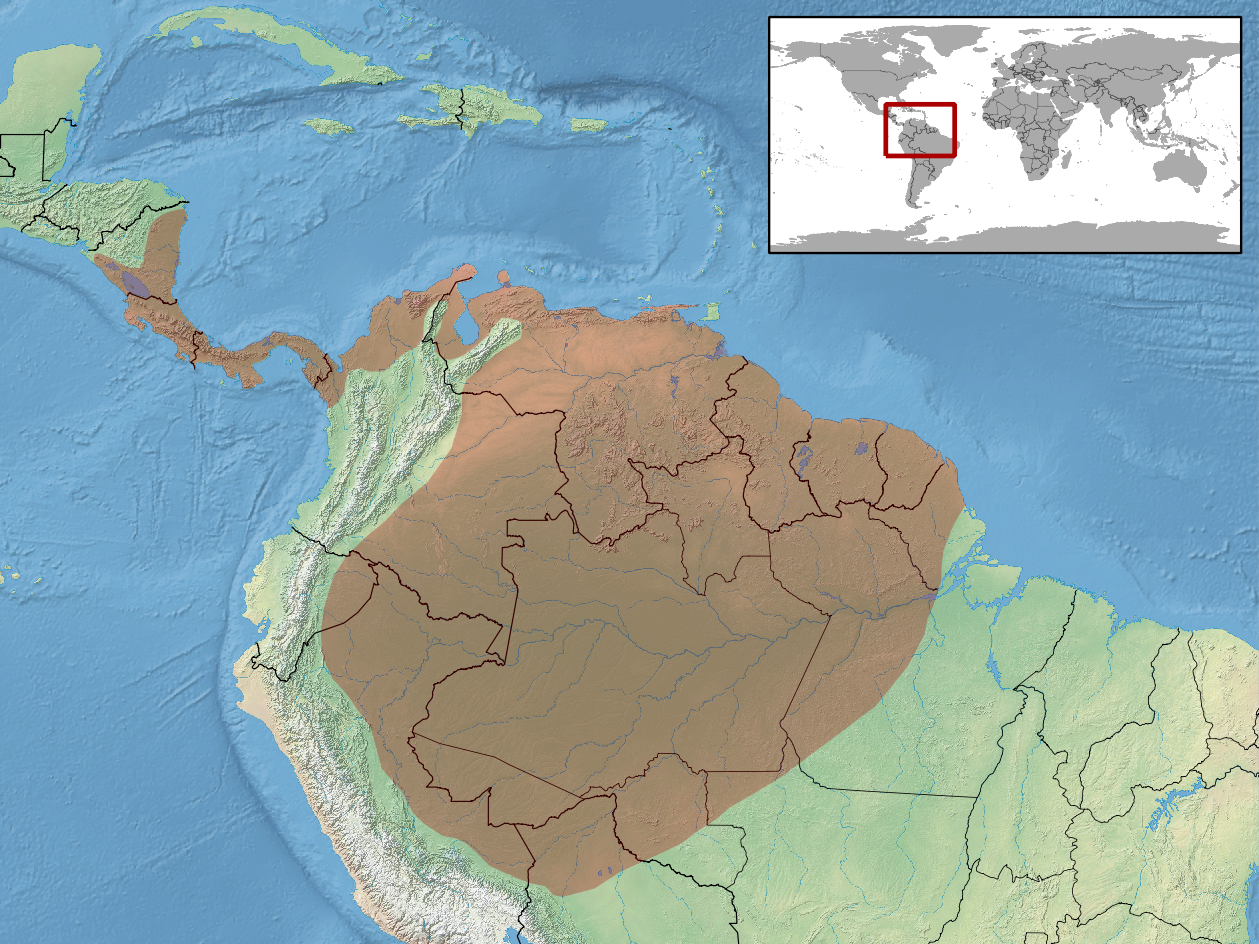

= Drymobius rhombifer =

Species of snake

Drymobius rhombifer, the Esmarald racer, is a species of non-venomous snake in the family Colubridae. The species is found in El Salvador, Nicaragua, Costa Rica, Panama, Colombia, Venezuela, French Guiana, Ecuador, Bolivia, Peru, and Brazil.
