= Racing (disambiguation) =

Racing is a competition of speed. Racing takes many forms – see List of forms of racing.

In British English, the word racing is often used specifically to mean Horse racing.

Racing may also refer to:

== Sports teams ==
=== France ===
- Racing Club de France, a French sports club
- Racing Club de France Football, a French football club
- RC Lens (Racing Club de Lens), a French football club
  - RC Lens Féminin, French women's football club
- RC Strasbourg Alsace (Racing Club de Strasbourg Alsace), a French football club
- Racing 92, a French rugby union club
- Paris Basket Racing, a former French basketball club

=== Spain ===
- Racing de Ferrol, a Spanish football club
- Racing de Madrid, a former Spanish football club
- Racing de Santander, a Spanish football club

=== Elsewhere ===
- Racing Club de Avellaneda, an Argentinean football club
- Racing Club de Montevideo, an Uruguayan football club
- K.R.C. Genk (Koninklijke Racing Club Genk), a Belgian football club
- Racing CH (Racing Club Haïtien), a Haitian football club
- Racing Club Warwick F.C., an English football club
- Racing FC Union Luxembourg, a Luxembourgian football club
- Racing Louisville FC, an American women's soccer club
- Racing de Huamachuco, a Peruvian football club
- Royal Racing Club Bruxelles, a Belgian sports club

== Other uses ==
- Racing (album), a 2004 album by Loudness
- Cartoon Network Racing, a PlayStation 2 video game
- Wikiracing, a Wikipedia challenge game

== See also ==
- Racer (disambiguation)
- Race (disambiguation)
