= Drymobius chloroticus =

Conservation status
- Least Concern (IUCN 3.1)

Scientific classification
- Kingdom: Animalia
- Phylum: Chordata
- Class: Reptilia
- Order: Squamata
- Suborder: Serpentes
- Family: Colubridae
- Genus: Drymobius
- Species: D. chloroticus

Binomial name
- Drymobius chloroticus (Cope, 1886)
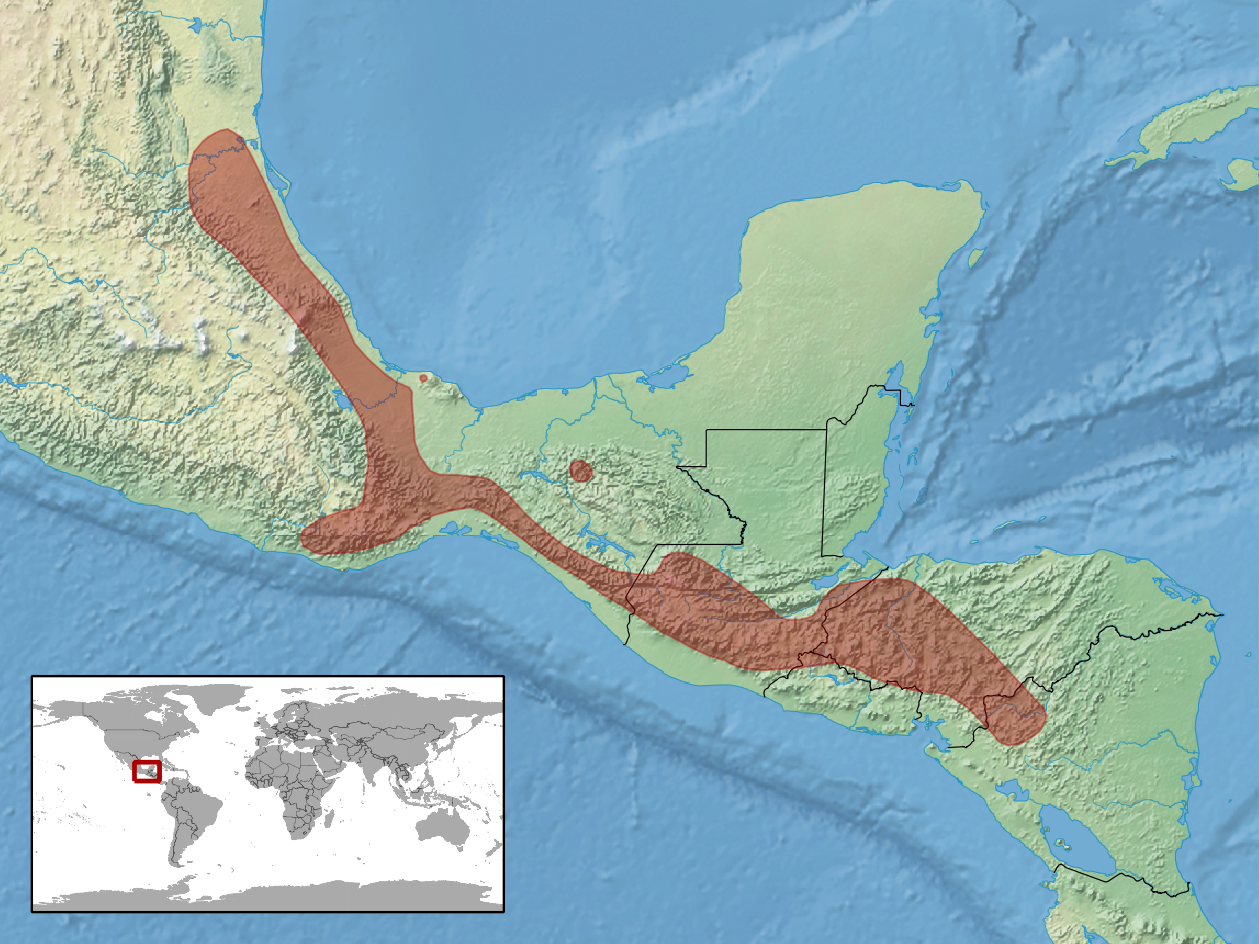

Species of snake

Drymobius chloroticus, the green highland racer, is a species of non-venomous snake in the family Colubridae. The species is found in Mexico, Belize, Honduras, Guatemala, El Salvador, and Nicaragua.
