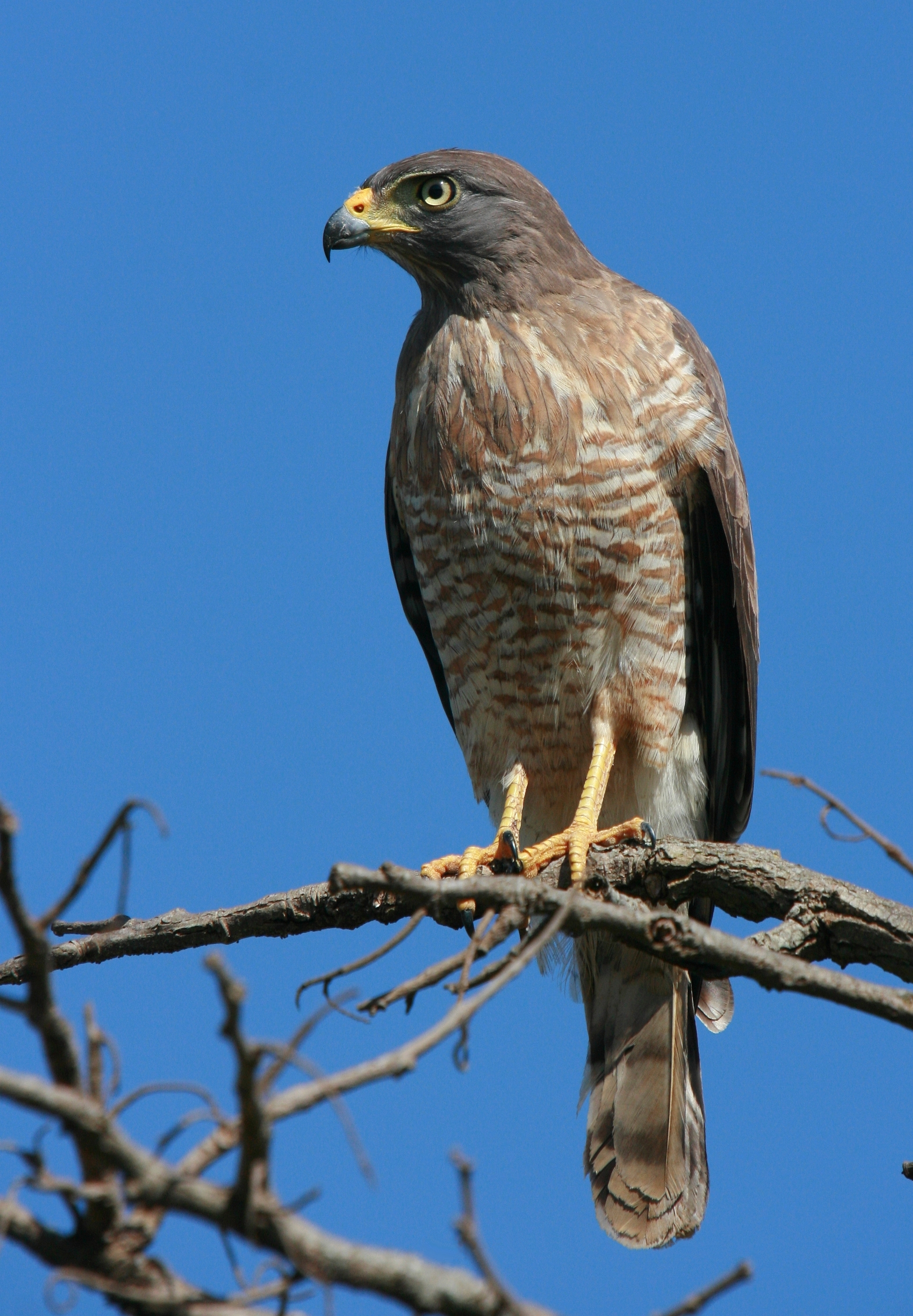
- In Goiás, Brazil

Conservation status
- Least Concern (IUCN 3.1)

Scientific classification
- Kingdom: Animalia
- Phylum: Chordata
- Class: Aves
- Order: Accipitriformes
- Family: Accipitridae
- Subfamily: Buteoninae
- Genus: Rupornis; Kaup, 1844
- Species: R. magnirostris

Binomial name
- Rupornis magnirostris (Gmelin, JF, 1788)

Synonyms
- Buteo magnirostris

Audio

= Roadside hawk =

Species of bird

The roadside hawk (Rupornis magnirostris) is a relatively small bird of prey found in the Americas. This vocal species is often the most common raptor in its range. It has many subspecies and is now usually placed in the monotypic genus Rupornis instead of Buteo.

== Taxonomy ==
The roadside hawk was formally described in 1788 by the German naturalist Johann Friedrich Gmelin in his revised and expanded edition of Carl Linnaeus's Systema Naturae. He placed it with the eagles, hawks and relatives in the genus Falco and coined the binomial name Falco magnirostris. Gmelin based his description on the "Épervier à gros bec de Cayenne" that had been described and illustrated in 1770 by the French polymath Comte de Buffon in his multi-volume Histoire Naturelle des Oiseaux. The roadside hawk is now the only species placed in the genus Rupornis that was introduced in 1844 by the German naturalist Johann Jakob Kaup. The genus name combines the Ancient Greek rhupos meaning "dirt" or "filth" with ornis meaning "bird". The specific epithet magnirostris combines the Latin magnus meaning "great" with -rostris meaning "billed".

=== Subspecies ===
Twelve subspecies are recognised. Their distributions are as follow:

- R. m. griseocauda (Ridgway, 1874) – Mexico (south from Colima, Nuevo León and Tamaulipas, except Yucatán and Tabasco) south to northwest Costa Rica and western Panama
- R. m. conspectus Peters, 1913 – southeast Mexico (Tabasco and Yucatán Peninsula) and north Belize
- R. m. gracilis Ridgway, 1885 – Cozumel and Isla Holbox, near Yucatán (Mexico)
- R. m. sinushonduri (Bond, 1936) – Guanaja and Roatán, off Honduras
- R. m. petulans (van Rossem, 1935) – southwest Costa Rica and Pacific slope of west Panama to Tuira River, and adjacent islands
- R. m. alius Peters & Griscom, 1929 – San José and San Miguel, in Pearl Islands (Gulf of Panama)
- R. m. magnirostris (Gmelin, 1788) nominate – Colombia south to west Ecuador, east to Venezuela and the Guianas, and south to Amazonian Brazil (Madeira River east to Atlantic coast)
- R. m. occiduus Bangs, 1911 – east Peru, west Brazil (south of Amazon, west of Madeira River) and north Bolivia
- R. m. saturatus (P.L. Sclater & Salvin, 1876) – Bolivia, through Paraguay and southwest Brazil (southwest Mato Grosso) to west Argentina (south to La Rioja)
- R. m. nattereri (P.L. Sclater & Salvin, 1869) – northeast Brazil south to Bahia
- R. m. magniplumis (Bertoni, 1901) – southern Brazil to northeastern Argentina (Misiones) and adjacent Paraguay
- R. m. pucherani (J. Verreaux & E. Verreaux, 1855) – Uruguay and northeast Argentina (south to Buenos Aires Province)

== Distribution and habitat ==
The roadside hawk is common throughout its range: from Mexico through Central America to most of South America east of the Andes Cordillera. Vagrants are occasionally found in Texas in the United States. It is found from the northern Caribbean coast of South America south to the northeastern parts of Argentina. With the possible exception of dense rainforests, the roadside hawk is well adapted to most ecosystems in its range. It is also an urban bird, and is possibly the most common species of hawk seen in various cities throughout its range—or perhaps just the most conspicuous one, as it becomes aggressive when nesting and has been recorded attacking humans passing near the nest.

== Description ==
The roadside hawk is 31–41 cm (12–16 in) long and weighs 250–300 g (8.8–10.6 oz). Males are about 20% smaller than females, but otherwise the sexes are similar. In most subspecies, the lower breast and underparts are barred brown and white, and the tail has four or five grey bars. Twelve subspecies are usually recognised and there is significant plumage variation between these. Depending on the subspecies involved, the roadside hawk is mainly brown or grey. It is fairly common to observe a touch of rufous (i.e., a light reddish-brown) on the bird's wings, especially when seen in flight. Its call is a very high-pitched piercing squeak. The eyes of adult roadside hawks are whitish or yellow. As suggested by its specific name, its beak is relatively large.

The roadside hawk is the smallest hawk in the widespread genus Buteo; although Ridgway's hawk and the white-rumped hawk are scarcely larger. In flight, the relatively long tail and disproportionately short wings of the roadside hawk are distinctive. It frequently soars, but does not hover.

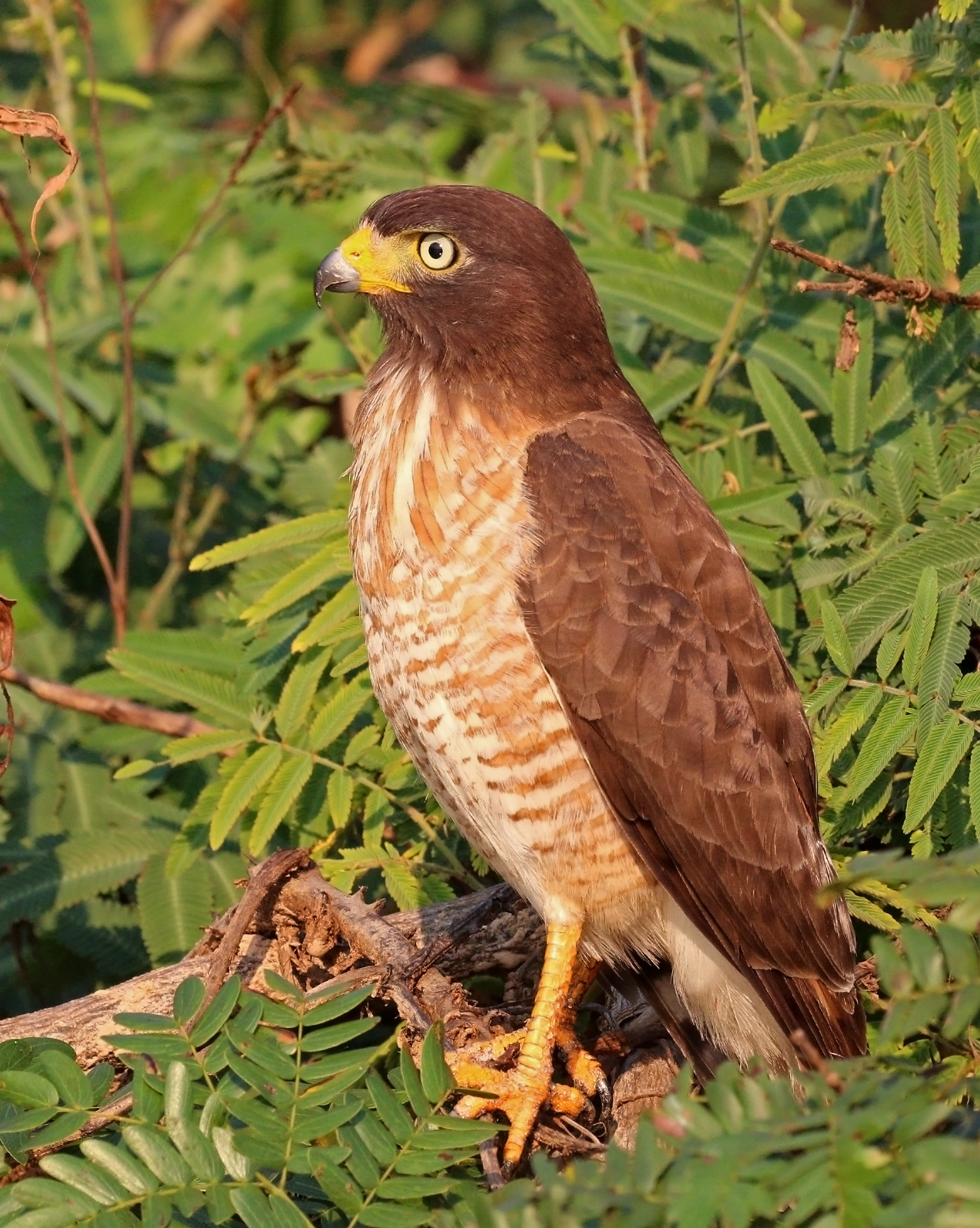
Immature R. m. saturatus
The Pantanal, Brazil

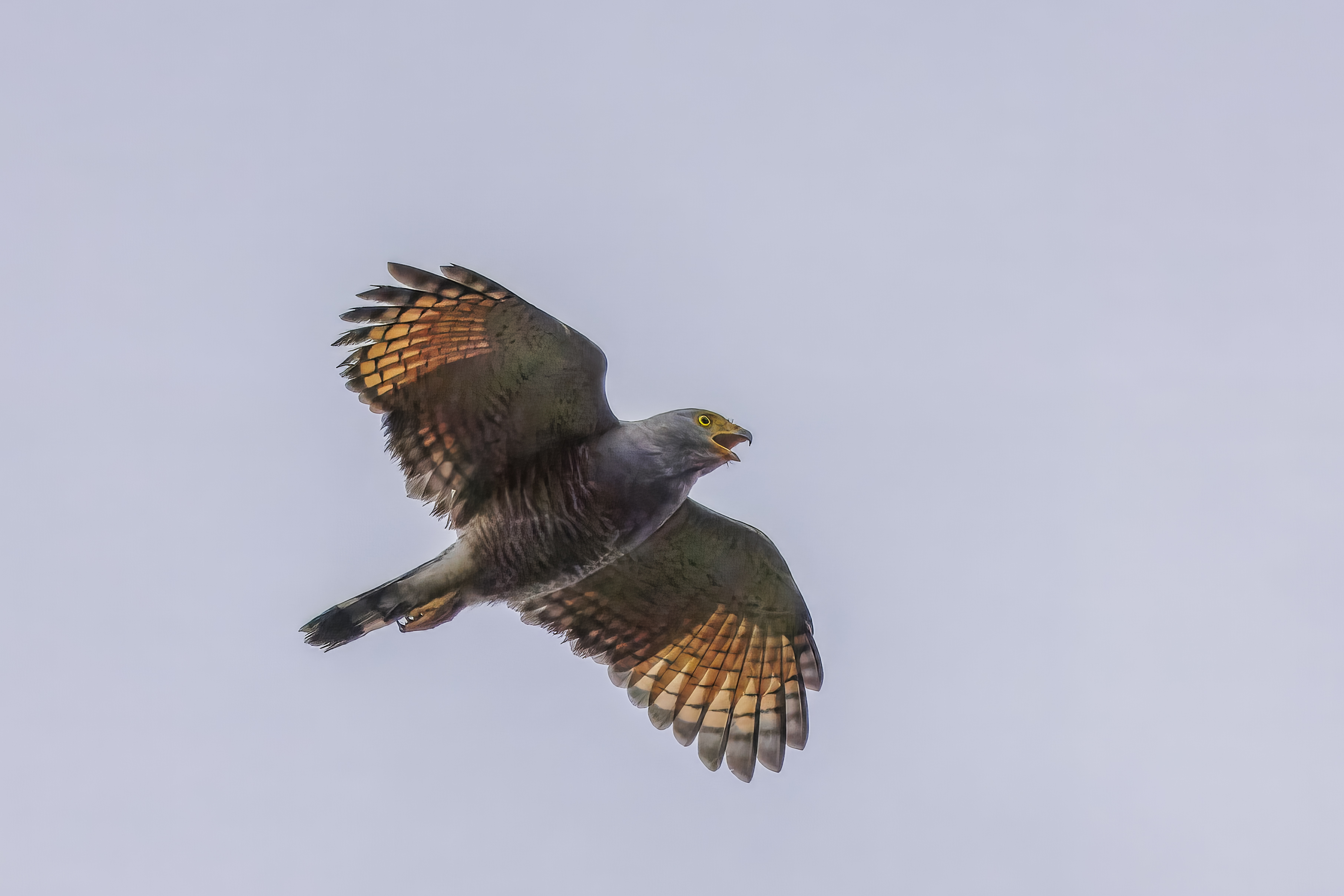
R. m. magnirostris, West Ecuador

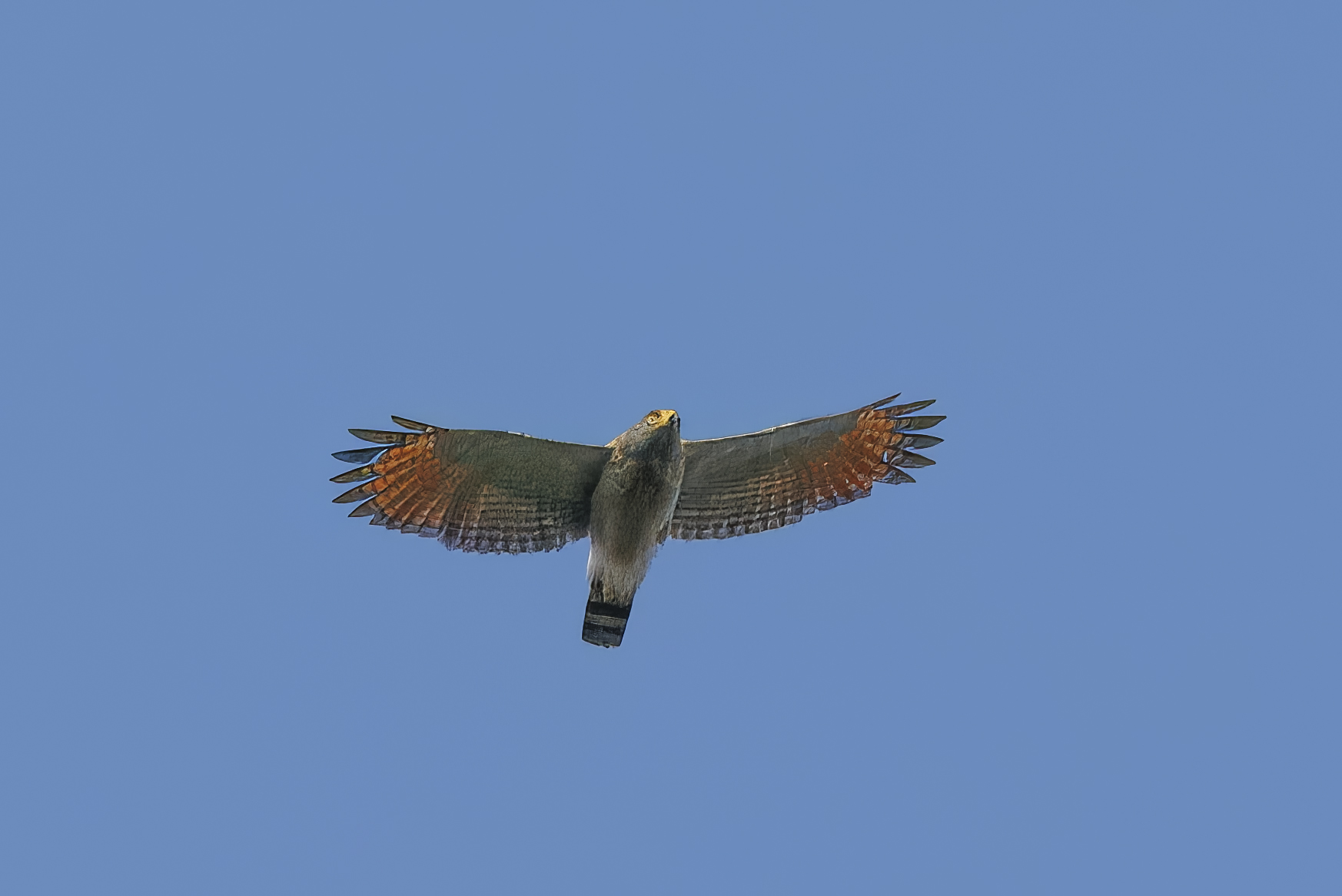
R. m. magnirostris, East Ecuador

== Behavior and ecology ==
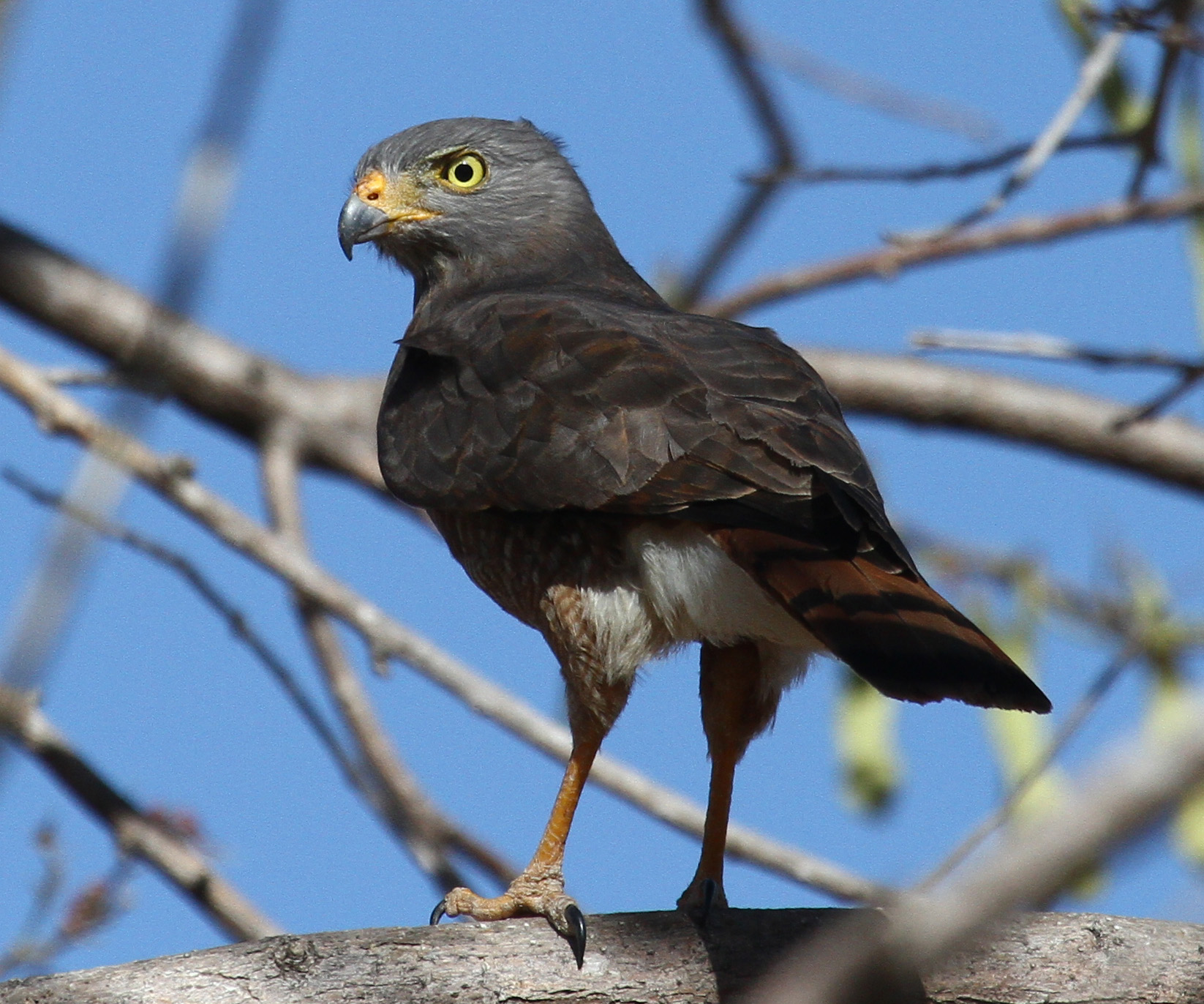
In Palo Verde NP, Costa Rica

=== Breeding ===
The bulky stick nest is lined with leaves and placed near the top of a tree. The clutch of one or two eggs is incubated for around 37 days, beginning after the first egg is laid.

=== Food and feeding ===
The roadside hawk's diet consists mainly of insects, squamates, and small mammals, such as young common marmosets and similar small monkeys which are hunted quite often. It will also take small birds, but far less often than generalists such as the related but larger white-tailed hawk, or bird specialists like the more distantly related aplomado falcon. Mixed-species feeding flocks it encounters when hunting in open cerrado habitat are not particularly wary of it: they watch it lest the hawk come too close, but consider them hardly more of a threat than the diminutive American kestrel.

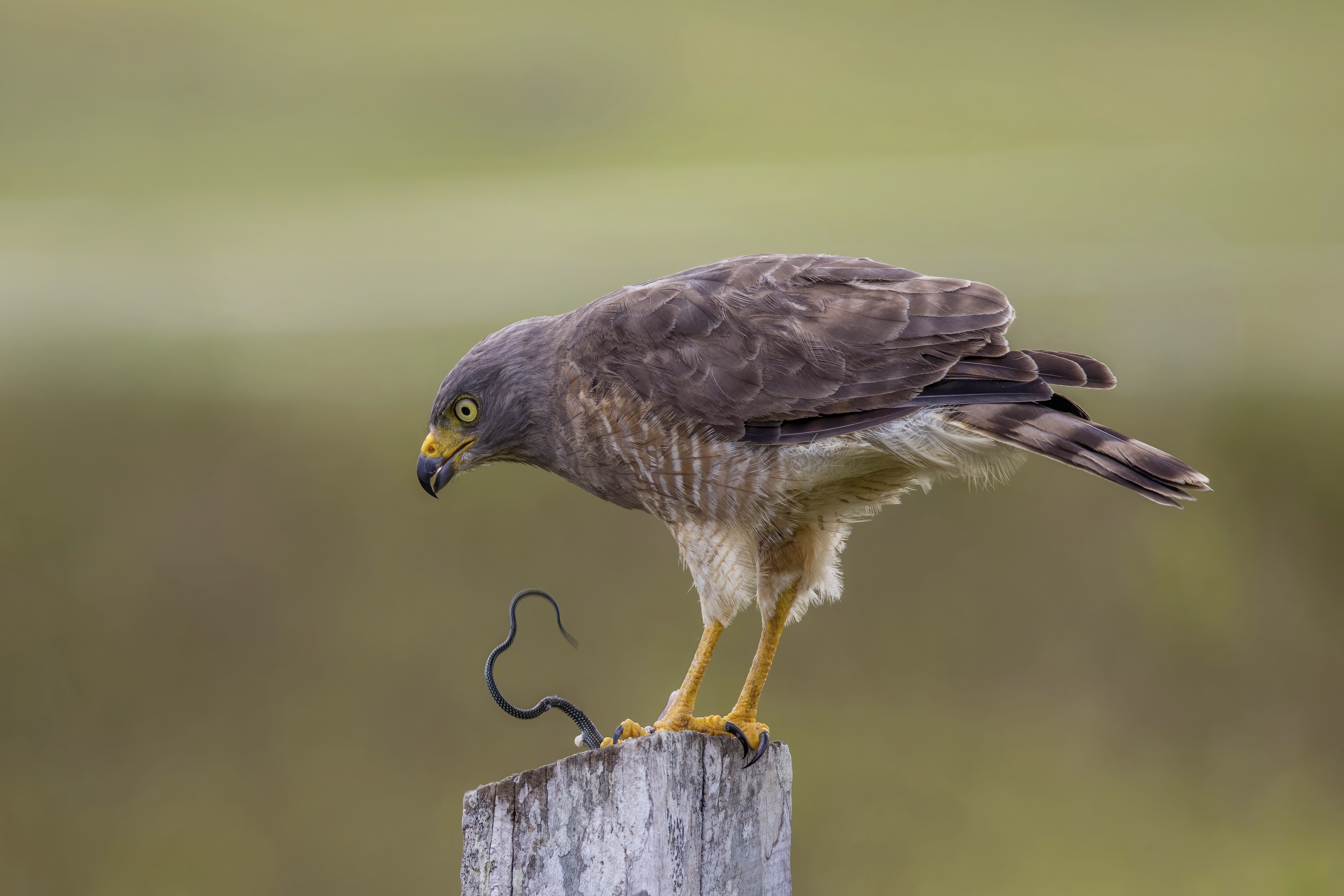
R. m. griseocauda eating speckled racer, Belize

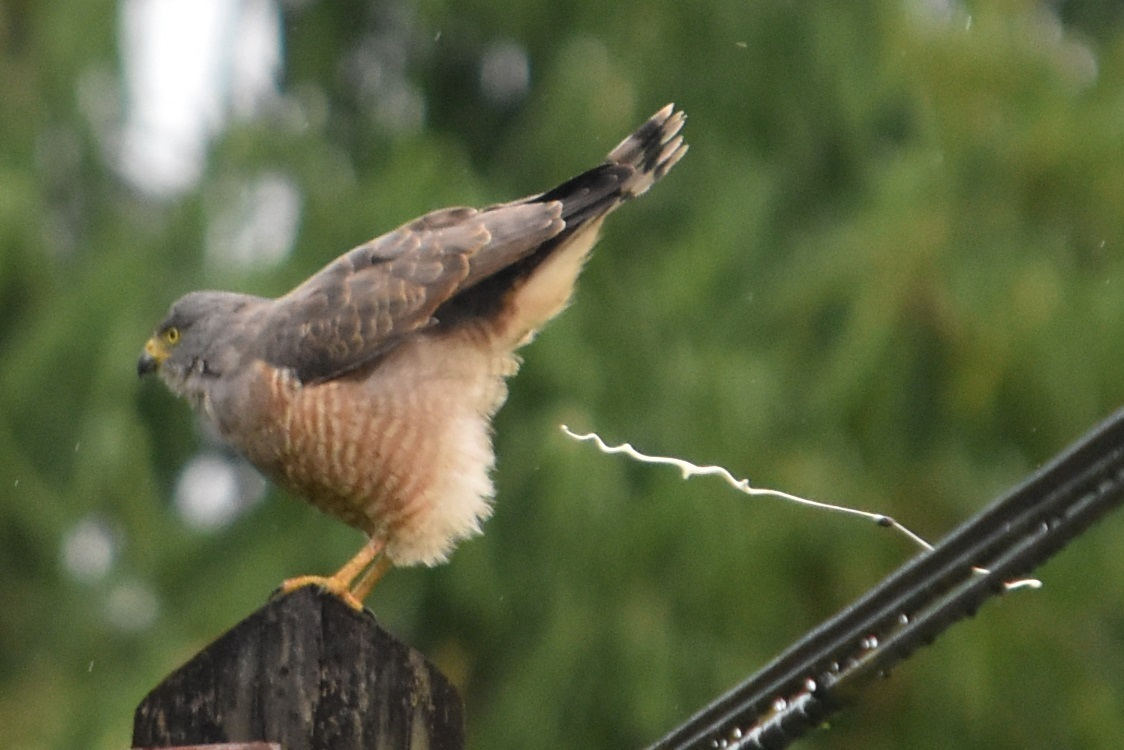
Defecating

=== Hunting ===
Roadside hawks regularly hunt using the "still hunting" method while patiently waiting for prey. While perch hunting, a hawk will drop or glide down from an elevated position to capture their prey. Though most attempts are successful through this technique, it is crucial to consider that their style of hunting varies in success depending on the habitat they explore.
