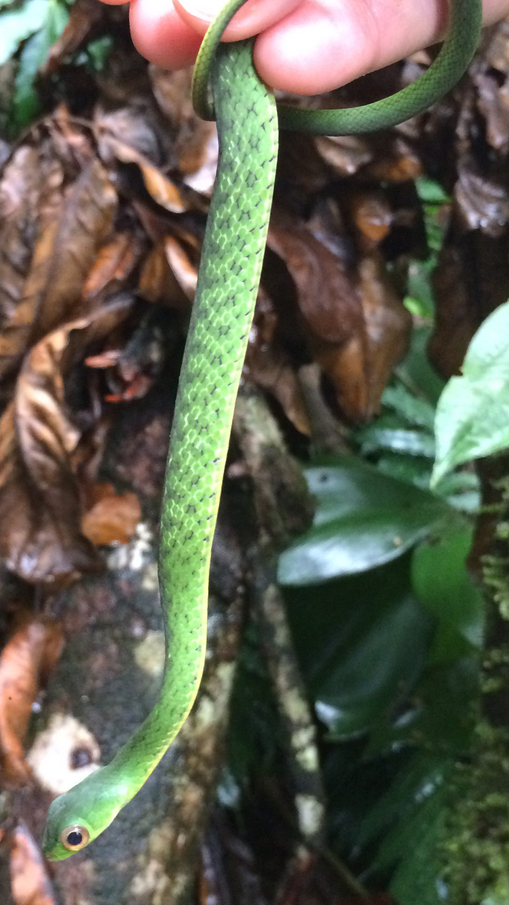

Conservation status
- Least Concern (IUCN 3.1)

Scientific classification
- Domain: Eukaryota
- Kingdom: Animalia
- Phylum: Chordata
- Class: Reptilia
- Order: Squamata
- Suborder: Serpentes
- Family: Colubridae
- Genus: Drymobius
- Species: D. melanotropis

Binomial name
- Drymobius melanotropis (Cope, 1876)
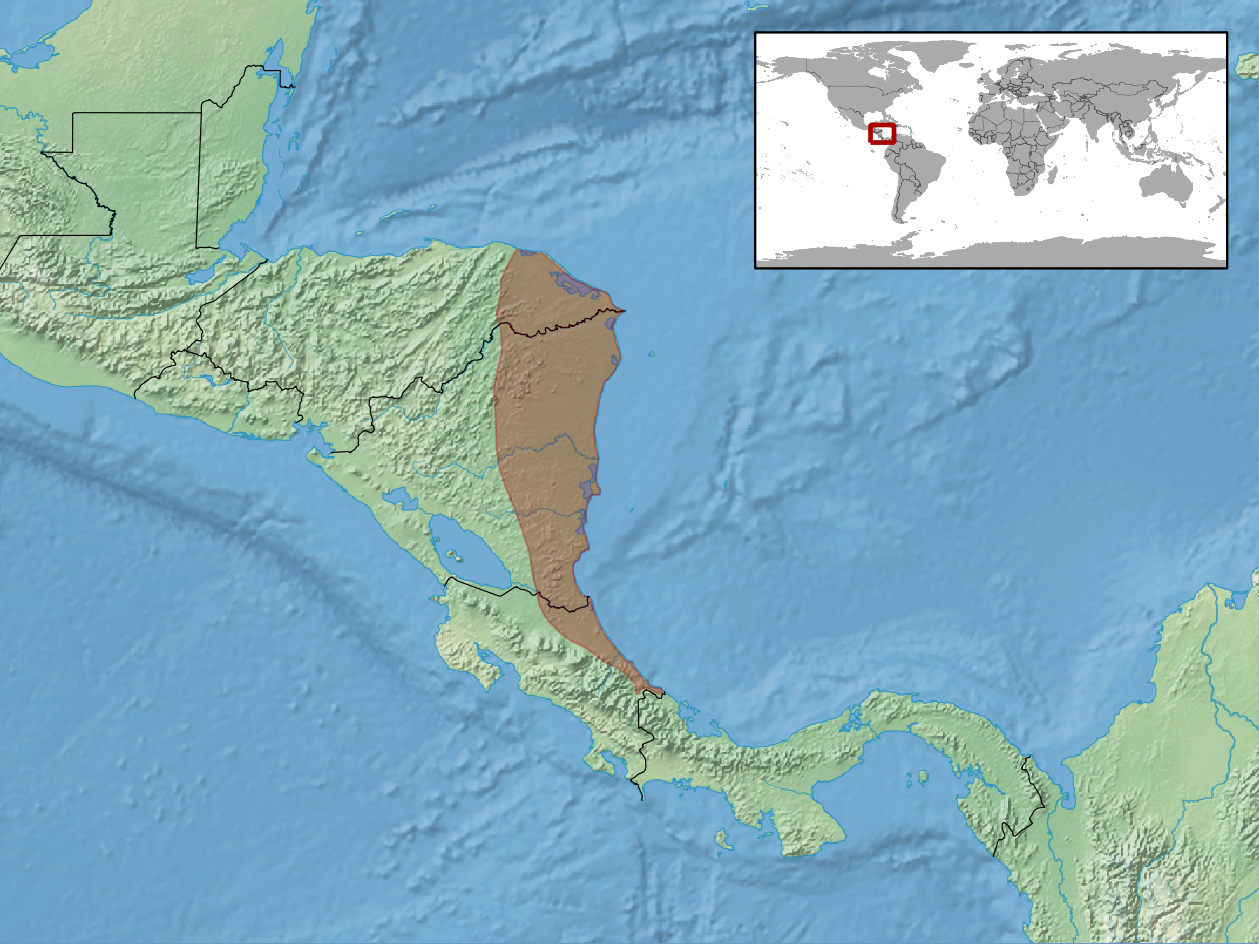

Synonyms
- Dendrophidium melanotropis Cope, 1876; Elaphis melanotropis — Cope, 1887; Coluber ? [sic] melanotropis — Boulenger, 1894; Drymobius melanotropis — Stuart, 1933; Drymobius melanotropis — J. Peters & Orejas-Miranda, 1970; Drymobius melanotropis — Villa et al., 1988

= Drymobius melanotropis =

Species of snake

Drymobius melanotropis, commonly known as the black forest racer, is a species of nonvenomous colubrid snake endemic to Central America.

== Geographic range ==
It ranges through Costa Rica, Honduras, Nicaragua, and Panama.

== Description ==
Drymobius melanotropis is green above, with black on the keels of the median three dorsal rows. The green color extends to the outer fourth of the ventral shields, and the center of the belly is yellow. Adults are about 1.25 m (50 in.) in total length.
