= ZTE Racer =

Android Smartphone

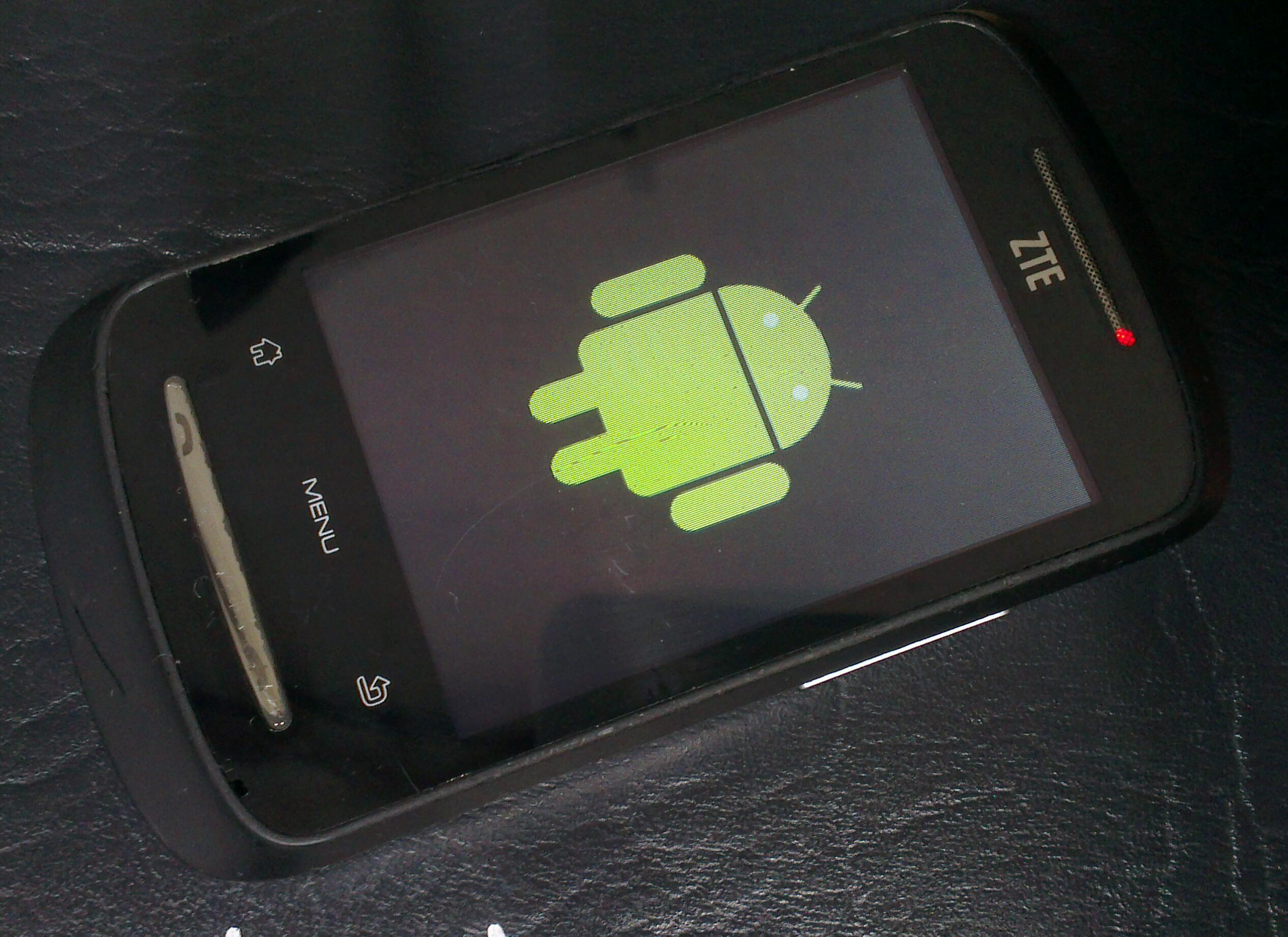
- Manufacturer: ZTE
- Type: Slate smartphone
- First released: July 2010
- Successor: ZTE Racer II, ZTE Blade
- Dimensions: 102 mm (4.0 in) H 55 mm (2.2 in) W 14.5 mm (0.57 in) D
- Weight: 100 g (3.5 oz)
- Operating system: Linux 2.6.29 used in Android 2.1 Eclair
- CPU: Qualcomm MSM7227 600 MHz processor
- GPU: Adreno 200
- Memory: 256 MB RAM
- Storage: 256 MB NAND; 2 GB microSD memory card (SD 2.0 compatible) microSD slot: supports up to 8 GB
- Battery: 1100 mAh; Internal rechargeable lithium-ion battery, 3 hours 30 mins talk time and 200 hours (8 days) stand-by time
- Rear camera: 3.15 megapixel with auto focus
- Display: 240 × 320 px, 2.8 in (71 mm), 143 PPI, QVGA, TFT LCD resistive touchscreen
- Connectivity: Wi-Fi (802.11 b/g), Bluetooth 2.1+EDR, GSM 900 1800 1900 MHz HSPA/WCDMA 900 2100 MHz, GPS
- Data inputs: Single-touch resistive touchscreen display, 3-axis accelerometer, digital compass
- Other: Accelerometer, FM radio, compass, GPS, A-GPS

The ZTE Racer (also known as ZTE X850 in China but also ZTE Link in France, Soft Stone in Portugal, Dell XCD28 as marketed in India, Telstra Smart Touch T3020 in Australia and MTS 916 in Russia with 850MHz 3G network and 2100MHz 3G Network) is a phone manufactured by China's ZTE Corporation for the Android platform. It went on sale in July 2010, with a white variant released later.

== Reviews ==
The ZTE Racer was targeted at the relatively small-budget Android market, and at a £99 introductory price was a good competitor with plentiful features, wireless connectivity, good still camera quality, great battery life and FM radio. The downsides of the device are the resistive touch-screen, bad resolution, screen viewing angles, general build quality and camera video quality being the main criticism of the device.

== See also ==
- Galaxy Nexus
- List of Android smartphones
