= Lindner Fitness Center =

Coordinates: 42°3′39.6″N 88°17′10.6″W

The Lindner Fitness Center is a multi-purpose arena located in Elgin, Illinois, United States on the campus of Judson University. It is in the Eastern corner of the campus and faces the soccer field. The Fitness Center has two basketball courts which double as volleyball courts. A track runs around the edge of the gymnasium, raised above the floor.

It is home to the Judson University Eagles and formerly the home of the Elgin Racers of the International Basketball League.
