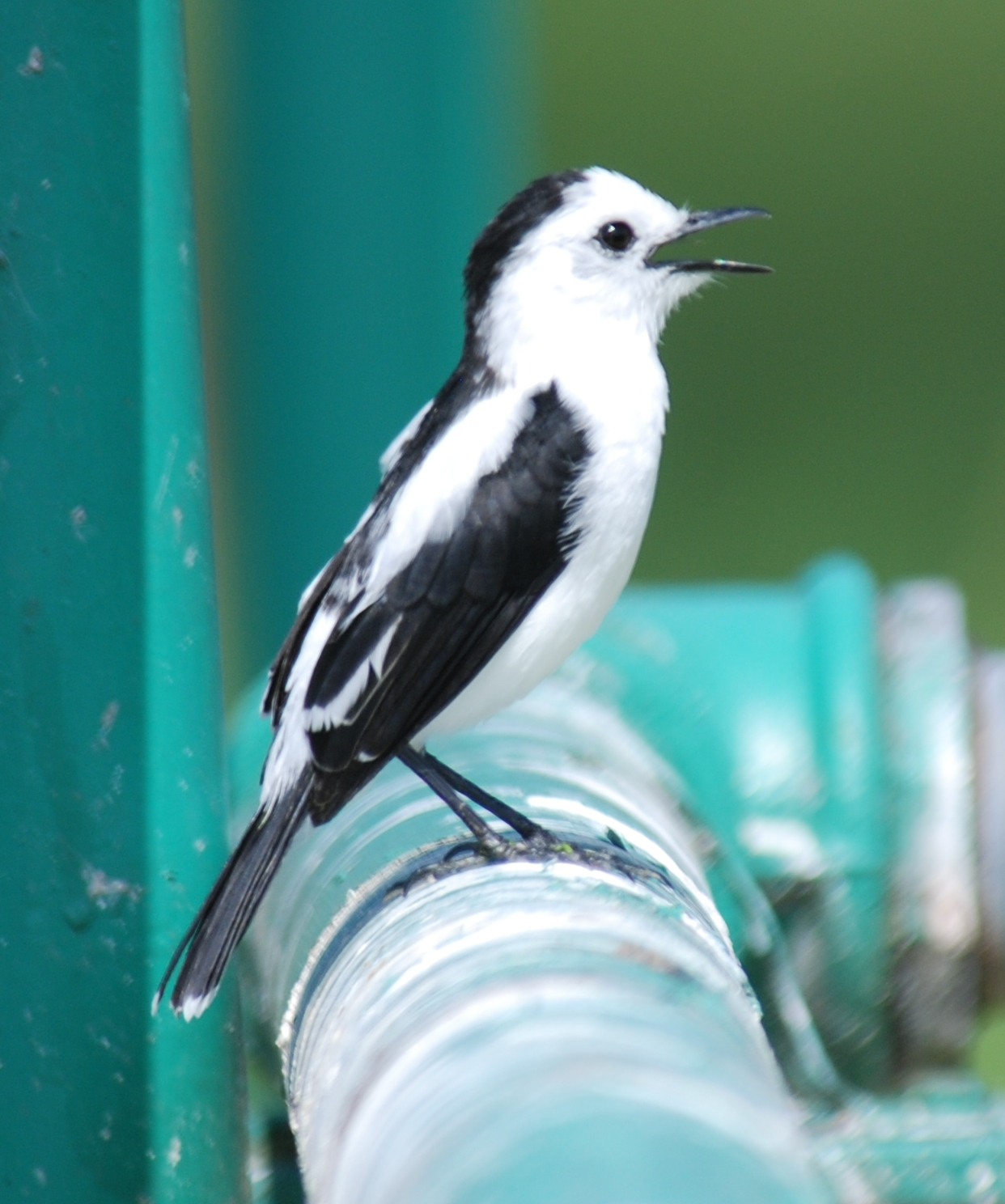

Conservation status
- Least Concern (IUCN 3.1)

Scientific classification
- Kingdom: Animalia
- Phylum: Chordata
- Class: Aves
- Order: Passeriformes
- Family: Tyrannidae
- Genus: Fluvicola
- Species: F. pica

Binomial name
- Fluvicola pica (Boddaert, 1783)

= Pied water tyrant =

Species of bird

The pied water tyrant (Fluvicola pica) is a small passerine bird in the tyrant flycatcher family. It is found in Brazil, Colombia, French Guiana, Guyana, Panama, Peru, Suriname, Trinidad, and Venezuela, as a vagrant to Ecuador and possibly other areas as well.

== Taxonomy and systematics ==
The pied water tyrant was formally described by the French polymath Georges-Louis Leclerc, Comte de Buffon in 1779 in his Histoire Naturelle des Oiseaux from a specimen collected in Cayenne, French Guiana. The bird was also illustrated in a hand-colored plate engraved by François-Nicolas Martinet in the Planches Enluminées D'Histoire Naturelle which was produced under the supervision of Edme-Louis Daubenton to accompany Buffon's text. Neither the plate caption nor Buffon's description included a scientific name but in 1783 the Dutch naturalist Pieter Boddaert coined the binomial name Muscicapa pica in his catalogue of the Planches Enluminées. The pied water tyrant is now placed in the genus Fluvicola that was introduced by the English naturalist William Swainson in 1827. The genus name is derived from a combination of Latin fluvius meaning "river" and -cola meaning "dweller". The specific epithet pica is Latin for "magpie".

The pied water tyrant is monotypic. However, what is now the black-backed water tyrant (F. albiventer) was previously treated as a subspecies of it.

== Description ==
The pied water tyrant is 12.5 to 13.5 cm (4.9 to 5.3 in) long and weighs 11 to 16 g (0.39 to 0.56 oz). Both sexes have prominent rictal bristles. Adult males are mostly white. They have a black hindcrown and nape, a mottled black and white back, black wings with small white tips on the tertials, and a black tail with small white tips. They have entirely white underparts. Females have brownish mixed with the black on the hindcrown, nape, and back. Both sexes have a dark iris, a sharply hooked black bill, and black legs and feet. Juveniles have the same pattern as adults but are brown where adults are black.

== Distribution and habitat ==
The pied water tyrant has a disjunct distribution which has not been fully defined. Sources agree that it is found in eastern Panama, from northern and central Colombia into northwestern Venezuela, on Trinidad, and from eastern Colombia across northern Venezuela, the Guianas, and to the mouth of the Amazon in extreme northern Brazil. They differ regarding records outside those areas. The IOC, the Clements taxonomy, and the North American Classification Committee of the American Ornithological Society (AOS) do not list any other countries. BirdLife International (BLI) adds Aruba, Bonaire, Curaçao, Ecuador, and Peru as locations where the species is a resident. The IUCN, which generally uses BLI range data, lists it as resident in Ecuador and Peru and as a vagrant in Aruba, Bonaire, Sint Eustatius, and Curaçao. The Cornell Lab of Ornithology's Birds of the World cites refereed papers, other published works, and eBird data to note its minor presence in Ecuador and Peru. The South American Classification Committee of the AOS lists it as confirmed in Peru and present as a vagrant in Ecuador. Neither mention the other Caribbean islands.

The pied water tyrant primarily inhabits freshwater marshes and the margins of lakes and ponds; it also occurs in nearby grasslands and gardens. In elevation it occurs mostly below 450 m (1,500 ft) but reaches 1,000 m (3,300 ft) in Colombia.

== Behavior ==
=== General ===
The pied water tyrant is described as "active and perky". It constantly flicks its tail down and up and often spreads it.

=== Movement ===
The pied water tyrant is generally regarded as a year-round resident.

=== Feeding ===
The pied water tyrant feeds on insects. It primarily forages singly or in somewhat separated pairs. It takes prey mostly in the open by gleaning from floating and emergent vegetation; it also takes prey from the water surface and open ground or jumps from the ground to snatch it in mid-air. It often is seen on low perches like fence posts and on floating vegetation and sometimes runs on the ground to capture prey.

=== Breeding ===
The pied water tyrant's breeding season has not been fully defined. It spans April to November in Colombia and Venezuela and June to October on Trinidad. Both sexes build the nest, a roundish ball with a side entrance near its top made from dried grass and leaves lined with feathers. It is placed at the end of a branch, on a stump, or in a small bush and often overhangs water. The clutch is two to three eggs that are white with a few brown spots. Both parents incubate the clutch and brood and provision nestlings. The incubation period and time to fledging are not known. Nests have been parasitized by the shiny cowbird (Molothrus bonariensis).

=== Vocalization ===
What is thought to be the pied water tyrant's song is "a slightly buzzy choo-wer over and over". Its calls include "a short, nasal dreéeap! [and] a soft pic like a bubble bursting". The dreéeap! call is usually made at dawn or dusk, and the bird sometimes jumps straight up as high as 1 m (3 ft) during it.

== Status ==
The IUCN has assessed the pied water tyrant as being of Least Concern. It has a very large range; its estimated population of at least 500,000 mature individuals is believed to be decreasing. No immediate threats have been identified. It is considered overall fairly common to locally common, and common in Colombia and Venezuela.
