= Racer X =

Racer X may refer to:

- Racer X (band), a Los Angeles-based heavy metal band.
- Racer X (Speed Racer character), a character from the 1960s Japanese anime Speed Racer.
- Racer-X, a 1984 EP by Big Black.
- "Racer X," a 1998 Vibe magazine article by Ken Li that inspired the 2001 film The Fast and the Furious
