= ZTE Racer II =

Android-based smartphone

- Manufacturer: ZTE
- Type: Slate smartphone
- First released: September 2011
- Dimensions: 104 mm (4.1 in) H 55.4 mm (2.18 in) W 13.5 mm (0.53 in) D
- Weight: 100 g (3.5 oz)
- Operating system: Android v2.2 (Froyo)
- CPU: Broadcom BCM2157, 500 MHz ARM11
- Memory: 512 MB RAM
- Storage: 256 MB NAND
- Removable storage: microSD (supports up to 32 GB)
- Battery: 1100 mAh; Internal rechargeable lithium-ion battery, 4 hours 35 mins talk time 164 hours stand-by time
- Rear camera: 3.15 megapixel with auto focus and geotaging
- Display: 240×320 px, 2.8 in (71 mm), 143 PPI, QVGA, TFT LCD resistive touchscreen
- Connectivity: Wi-Fi (802.11 b/g), Bluetooth 2.1 + EDR, A2DP; GSM 900 1800 1900 MHz HSDPA/WCDMA 900 2100 MHz
- Data inputs: Single-touch resistive touchscreen display, 3-axis accelerometer, digital compass
- Other: Accelerometer, FM radio with RDS, compass, GPS, A-GPS

ZTE Racer II (also known as ZTE Meteor Racer II or zte p728b) is a phone manufactured by China's ZTE Corporation for the Android platform. It went on sale in September 2011.

Turkcell T11 is a rebranded version of ZTE P728T, one of variations of ZTE Racer II.

== See also ==
- Galaxy Nexus
- List of Android smartphones
