= Elgin Racers =

- Founded: 2005
- League: IBL 2005-2014
- Team history: Windy City Dawgs; 2005; Elgin Racers; 2006-2008
- Based in: Elgin, Illinois
- Arena: Spartan Events Center; 2007; Lindner Fitness Center; 2006, 2008
- Colors: Black, Red, and Silver
- Owner: Bob Fischer
- Head coach: Michael Murphy
- Championships: 0

The Elgin Racers were a franchise of the International Basketball League. They played their home games at the Lindner Fitness Center at Judson University and the Spartan Events Center in Elgin, Illinois.

== 2005 season ==
The Windy City Dawgs' logo

The Windy City Dawgs were an International Basketball League team based in Palatine, Illinois. The team played home games at Harper College.

The Dawgs featured four all-stars; Brandon Moore, Ryan Edwards, Sherick Simpson and Brandon Watkins. Watkins (21.4 ppg) and Marlon London (25.4 ppg) were in the top in scoring. The team was 7-8 overall.

The team went through two owners, the second of which, Bob Fischer, moved the team to Elgin, Illinois for 2006.

== 2006 in Elgin ==
The franchise, rechristened the Racers, played home games at the Linder Fitness Center on the campus of Judson University. The Racers finished 16-6 in their inaugural season, good for third place in the East Division. The Racers were coached by James Condill in both 2005 and 2006.

== 2007 season ==
For 2007, the Racers moved to the Spartan Events Center. They also named Michael Murphy as head coach.

The team folded in 2008, the IBL ceased operations in 2015.

== Season by season ==
Regular Season
Year	Wins	Losses	Percentage	Division
2005	7	8	.466	5th - East Division
2006	16	6	.727	3rd - East Division
2007	16	6	.727	1st - Midwest Division

== All-Stars ==
=== 2005 ===
As Windy City Dawgs

- Ryan Edwards
- Brandon Moore
- Sherick Simpson
- Brandon Watkins

=== 2006 ===
- Corey Brown
- Sherick Simpson

=== 2007 ===
- DeAnthony Bowden
- Keith Gayden
- Sherick Simpson
