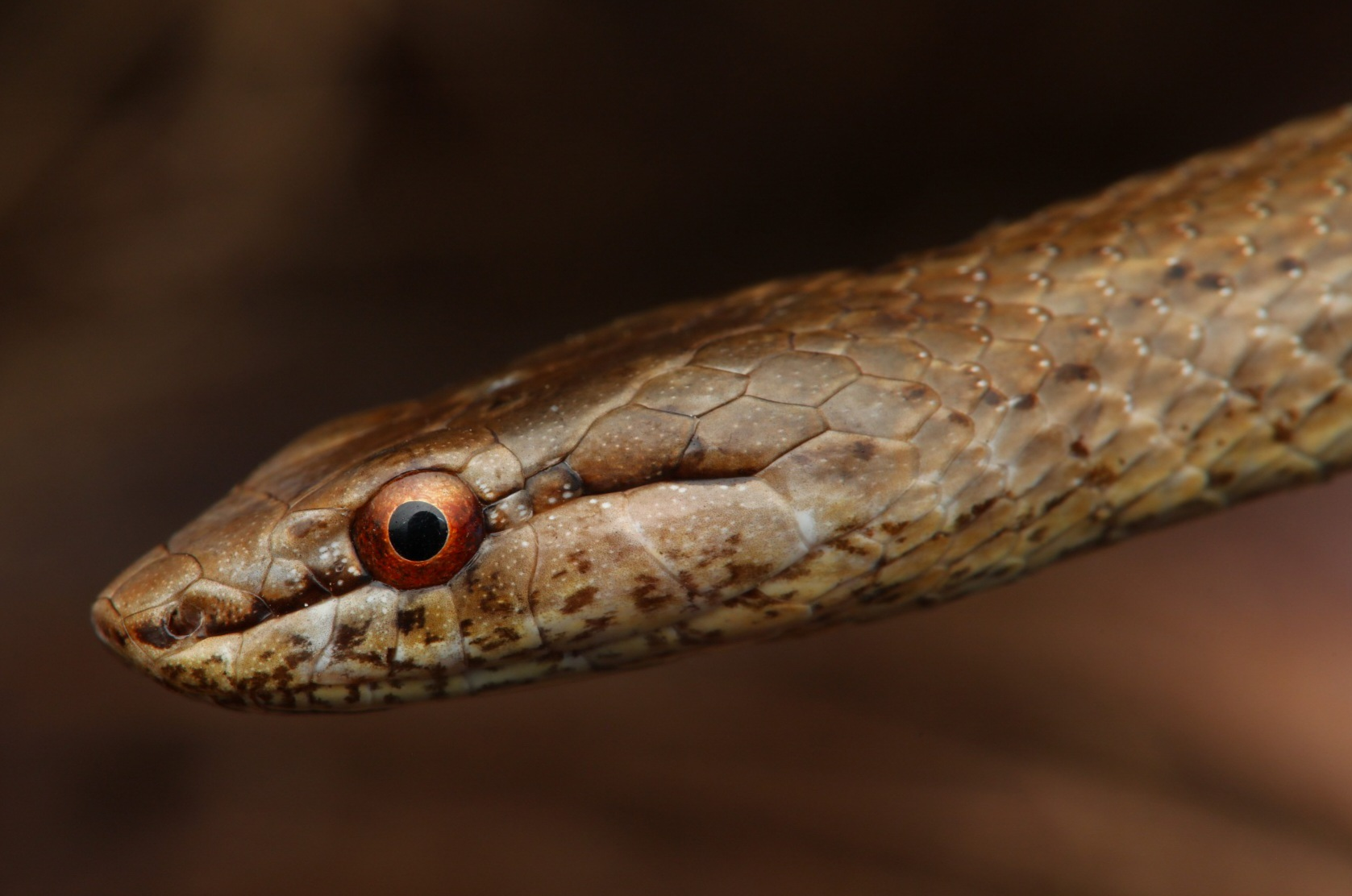

Conservation status
- Least Concern (IUCN 3.1)

Scientific classification
- Kingdom: Animalia
- Phylum: Chordata
- Class: Reptilia
- Order: Squamata
- Suborder: Serpentes
- Family: Colubridae
- Genus: Borikenophis
- Species: B. portoricensis

Binomial name
- Borikenophis portoricensis (Reinhardt and Lütken, 1863)

Synonyms
- Alsophis portoricensis Reinhardt and Lütken, 1863

= Borikenophis portoricensis =

Species of reptile

Borikenophis portoricensis (Puerto Rican Spanish: culebra corredora; English: Puerto Rican racer) is a snake endemic to Puerto Rico and the Virgin Islands. It can grow to three feet long.

== Range ==
The Puerto Rican racer is endemic to the island of Puerto Rico, as well as the Virgin Islands. It is found in a variety of forested habitats across its range, including Toro Negro State Forest. and El Yunque National Forest.

== Description ==
Its body sports a solid brown color with each of his scales edged by a darker brown. The Puerto Rican racer also possesses a neck hood similar, but narrower, to that of a cobra which it exposes by raising the front quarters of their bodies off the ground in a manner similar to that genus. However, unlike the Naja snakes, B. portoricensis does not gratuitously exhibit this behavior as an intimidation tactic and generally employs it while engaging on offensive behavior after being provoked, which typically involves adopting the posture followed by an emboldened strike.

== Feeding ==
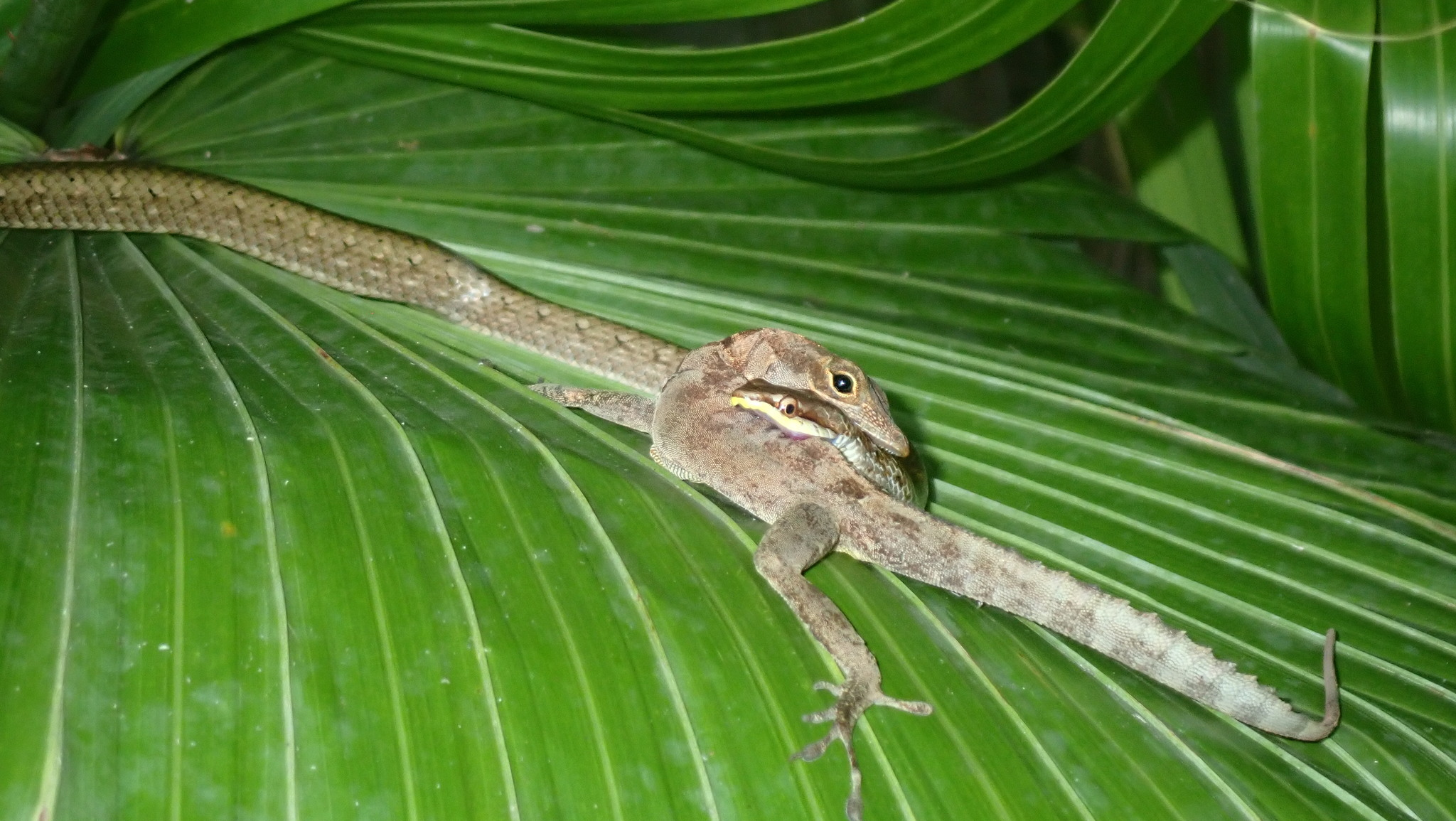
Eating a crested anole

Like the Toro Negros's other various garden snakes, it is a daytime hunter. It is capable of inflicting a venomous bite. The severity of its venom depends on the susceptibility of the victim : its venom is capable of fully paralyzing small reptiles and rodents rendering them helpless for consumption, but in humans its effects ranges from mild swelling to immobilization and severe numbness that may last up to a month. No fatalities have been reported from the bite of a Puerto Rican racer.

Once it captures its prey, B. portoricensis has a tendency of relocating it prior to feeding.

Although still susceptible to infection, it is more resistant to parasites than other local snakes, allowing it to survive exclusively on lizards.

== See also ==
- List of amphibians and reptiles of Puerto Rico
- Fauna of Puerto Rico
- List of endemic fauna of Puerto Rico
