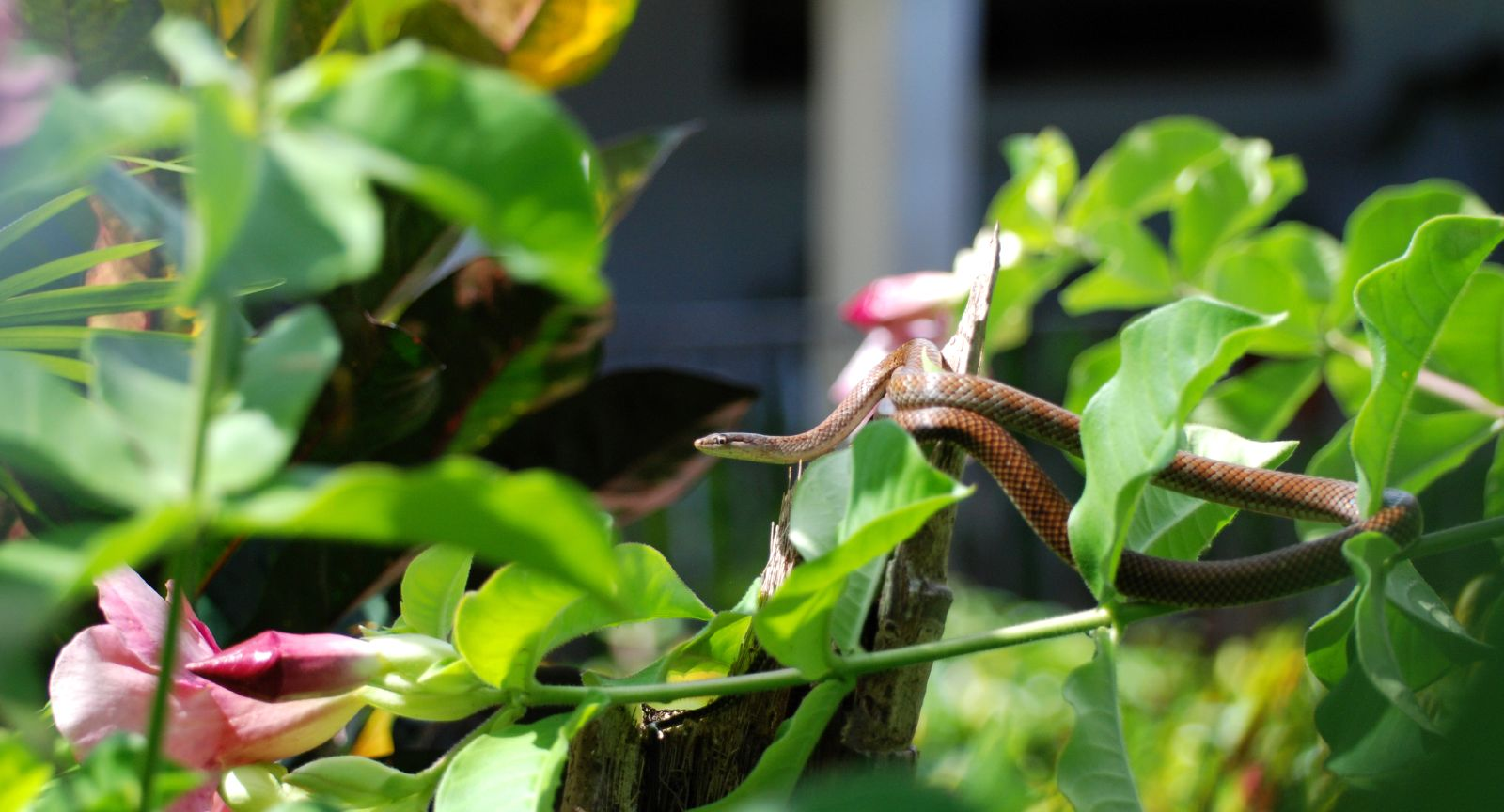
- Borikenophis portoricensis

Scientific classification
- Kingdom: Animalia
- Phylum: Chordata
- Class: Reptilia
- Order: Squamata
- Suborder: Serpentes
- Family: Colubridae
- Subfamily: Dipsadinae
- Genus: Borikenophis; Hedges & Vidal, 2009

Species
- 4, see text

Synonyms
- Alsophis

= Borikenophis =

Genus of snakes

Borikenophis is a genus of snakes in the family Colubridae endemic to the Puerto Rican archipelago and the Virgin Islands.

== Etymology ==
The genus name comes from Boriquen, the Taíno word for Puerto Rico and ophis, Greek for "snake".

== Species ==
Listed alphabetically.

- Borikenophis portoricensis (Reinhardt & Lütken, 1862) – Puerto Rican racer (Puerto Rico, Virgin Islands)
- Borikenophis prymnus (Schwartz, 1966) – Puerto Rican racer (Puerto Rico)
- Borikenophis sanctaecrucis (Cope, 1862) – St. Croix racer (St. Croix, U.S. Virgin Islands) - possibly extinct
- Borikenophis variegatus (Schmidt, 1926) – Mona racer (Mona Island)
