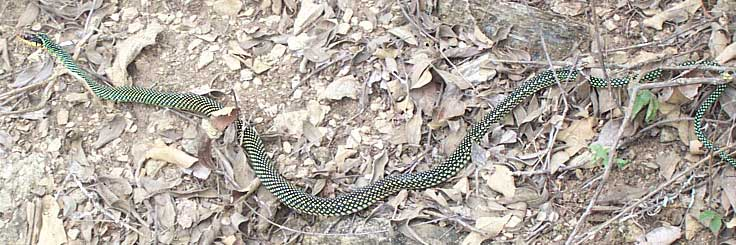
- Drymobius margaritiferus

Scientific classification
- Domain: Eukaryota
- Kingdom: Animalia
- Phylum: Chordata
- Class: Reptilia
- Order: Squamata
- Suborder: Serpentes
- Family: Colubridae
- Subfamily: Colubrinae
- Genus: Drymobius; Fitzinger, 1843

Synonyms
- Crossanthera Cope 1893

= Drymobius =

Genus of snakes

Drymobius is a genus of colubrid snakes commonly referred to as neotropical racers, which are endemic to the Americas. There are four species recognized in the genus.

== Geographic range ==
They are found predominantly in Mexico and Central America, but they range as far north as the southern tip of Texas in the United States, and as far south as Brazil in South America.

== Description ==
Drymobius species grow to .75–1 m (30–39 in) in total length. Their coloration and pattern vary widely among species.

== Habitat ==
They are found in areas of heavy vegetation, almost always near a permanent water source.

== Behaviour ==
Drymobius are diurnal species. They are fast moving, and do not generally hesitate to bite if handled.

== Diet ==
Their primary diet consists of frogs and toads.

== Reproduction ==
Breeding occurs in the spring, and clutches of 6-8 eggs are laid in the early summer. The eggs hatch in approximately two months. Hatchlings are 15–18 cm (6–7 in) in total length.

== Species & subspecies ==
- Drymobius chloroticus (Cope, 1886) - green highland racer - Mexico, Belize, Honduras, Guatemala, El Salvador, Nicaragua, and Costa Rica.
- Drymobius margaritiferus (Schlegel, 1837) - speckled racer - United States (Texas), Mexico, Panama, Guatemala, Honduras, Belize, El Salvador, Nicaragua, Costa Rica, and Colombia.
  - Drymobius margaritiferus margaritiferus (Schlegel, 1837) - southern Texas, Mexico
  - Drymobius margaritiferus fistulosus H.M. Smith, 1942 - Mexico
  - Drymobius margaritiferus maydis Villa, 1968 - Nicaragua
  - Drymobius margaritiferus occidentalis Bocourt, 1890 - Guatemala
- Drymobius melanotropis (Cope, 1876) - black forest racer - Honduras, Nicaragua, Costa Rica, and Panama.
- Drymobius rhombifer (Günther, 1860) - Esmarald racer - Nicaragua, Costa Rica, Panama, Colombia, Venezuela, French Guiana, Ecuador, Bolivia, Peru, and Brazil.
