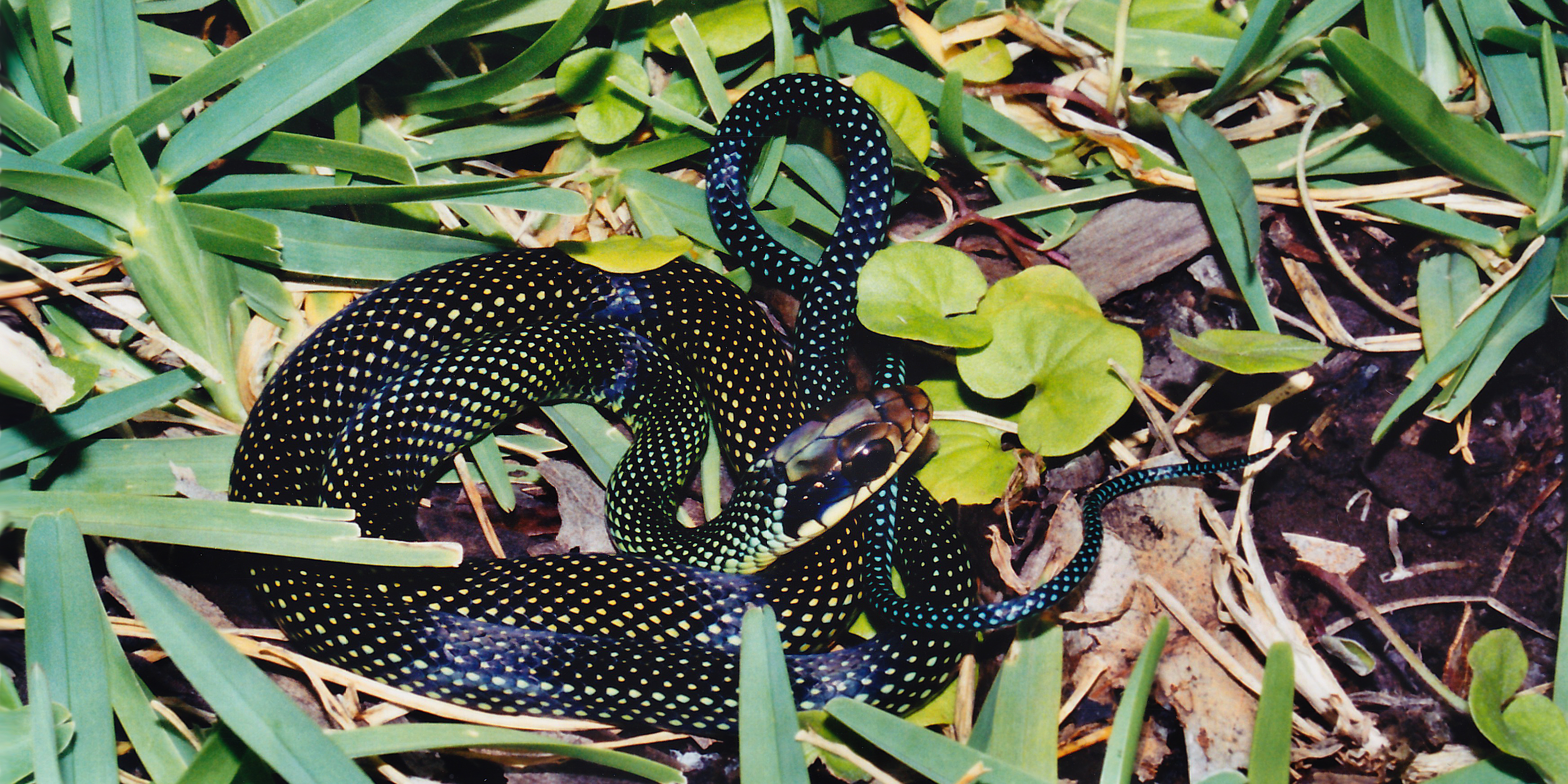
- Drymobius margaritiferus, Tamaulipas, Mexico

Conservation status
- Least Concern (IUCN 3.1)

Scientific classification
- Kingdom: Animalia
- Phylum: Chordata
- Class: Reptilia
- Order: Squamata
- Suborder: Serpentes
- Family: Colubridae
- Genus: Drymobius
- Species: D. margaritiferus

Binomial name
- Drymobius margaritiferus (Schlegel, 1837)

Synonyms
- Herpetodryas margaritiferus Schlegel, 1837; Leptophis margaritiferus — A.M.C. Duméril, Bibron & A.H.A. Duméril, 1854; Dromicus margaritiferus — Günther, 1858; Thamnosophis margaritiferus — Jan, 1863; Drymobius margaritiferus — Boulenger, 1894

= Drymobius margaritiferus =

Species of snake

Drymobius margaritiferus, commonly known as the speckled racer, is a species of nonvenomous colubrid snake native to the Americas. The specific name, margaritiferus, means "pearl-bearing" in Latin, referring to the pearl-like spots on the dorsal scales.

== Geographic range and habitat ==
This species ranges throughout Central America from the Isthmus of Tehuantepec and Yucatán Peninsula, southward to Panama and adjacent areas of northwest Colombia, occurring at elevations from sea level up to 4,750 feet (1,453 m). Northward, it is found in the coastal lowlands and lower exterior slopes of the Sierra Madres of Mexico, up the west coast to Sonora, and up the east coast to northern Tamaulipas. The northern limit of its distribution ranges into extreme south Texas, USA, where it is uncommon to rare in a few of the southernmost counties of the state.

Speckled racers occur in a wide variety of habitats, including: forest, forest edges and clearings, secondary growth, riparian zones, savannahs, marshlands, pastures, and roadsides. It is often said to favor humid and wet areas with permanent water sources. However, these snakes have been found in areas where no water was apparent, and habitats include tropical dry forests and tropical arid forests. In Costa Rica, it is described as "ubiquitous in all but the most humid lowland and pre-montane zones," including dry lowland forests.

== Description ==
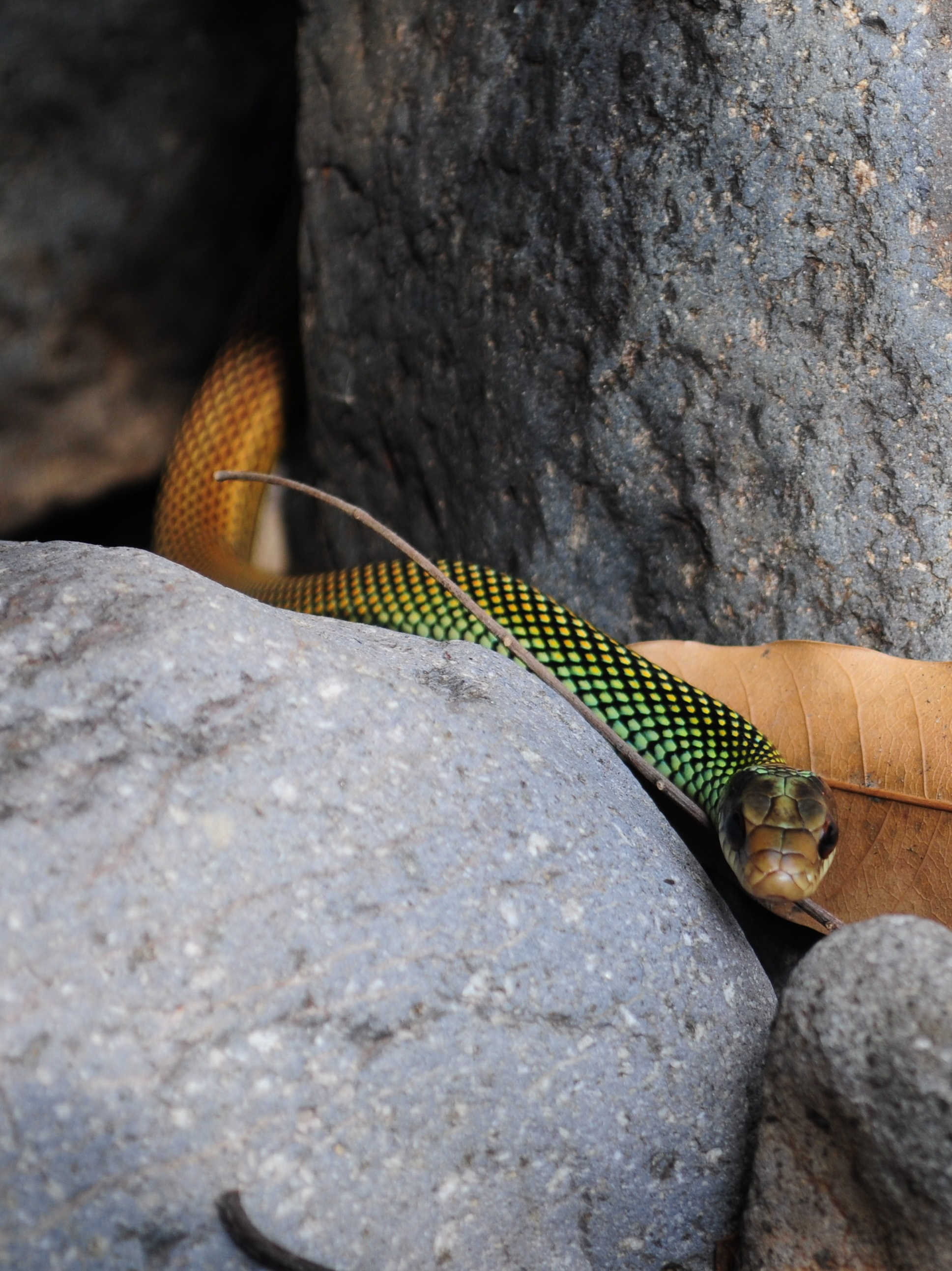
Drymobius margaritiferus

The speckled racer is typically black in color, with distinctive yellow and blue spotting, and one light-colored spot on each scale, which gives the snake an overall greenish hue. The labials are yellow, with black sutures. The underside is typically yellow to green. They average 30–40 in. (76–102 cm) in length, with a record specimen documented at 50 in. (127 cm).

The dorsal scales, which are feebly keeled middorsally, but smooth on the flanks, are arranged in 17 rows. The ventrals number 142–168; the subcaudals, 85–126.

== Natural history ==
As the name "racer" implies, it is a fast and agile species that is predominantly diurnal. It has been described as a nervous species, and will not hesitate to bite in self-defense when restrained or handled. Death feigning behavior, or thanatosis, was reported for two out of seven (28.5%) specimens that were caught and handled during field surveys conducted in Tamaulipas, Mexico.

They will consume a wide variety of prey, but primarily feed on frogs and toads. One study of 36 Guatemalan and Mexican specimens with food items in their stomachs found 86% had anurans (predominantly Eleutherodactylus), 8% lizards, 4% reptile eggs, and 2% small mammals. Juveniles are known to eat insects.

They are oviparous, typically laying eggs in the spring, although in southern areas, the species is known to deposit eggs as early as February and March. Clutch sizes range from two to eight eggs that are usually 1.5 inches (3.8 cm) in length. Incubation is typically eight to nine weeks, with hatchlings measuring 6 to 10½ inches (15.2–27.6 cm) long.

== Subspecies ==
There are four recognized subspecies of D. margaritiferus:

- Drymobius m. margaritiferus (Schlegel, 1837), Northern speckled racer: Atlantic versant, Texas to Colombia, and sections of Pacific in Chiapas, Mexico and southern range.
- Drymobius m. fistulosus (H.M. Smith, 1942), Central American speckled racer: Pacific versant, from southern Sonora to the Isthmus of Tehuantepec.
- Drymobius m. occidentalis (Bocourt, 1890), Western speckled racer: Pacific versant, from eastern Chiapas, Mexico to El Salvador.
- Drymobius m. maydis (Villa, 1968): Corn Islands, Nicaragua.

== Conservation status ==
The speckled racer is a threatened species in the state of Texas, USA, where it is uncommon to rare. In some regions of Mexico and Central America, it is a common species.
