= Borikenophis prymnus =

Scientific classification
- Kingdom: Animalia
- Phylum: Chordata
- Class: Reptilia
- Order: Squamata
- Suborder: Serpentes
- Family: Colubridae
- Genus: Borikenophis
- Species: B. prymnus

Binomial name
- Borikenophis prymnus (Schwartz, 1966)

Species of snake

The Puerto Rican racer (Borikenophis prymnus) is a species of snake in the family Colubridae. The species is endemic to the island of Puerto Rico.
