= Borikenophis variegatus =

Conservation status
- Near Threatened (IUCN 3.1)

Scientific classification
- Kingdom: Animalia
- Phylum: Chordata
- Class: Reptilia
- Order: Squamata
- Suborder: Serpentes
- Family: Colubridae
- Genus: Borikenophis
- Species: B. variegatus

Binomial name
- Borikenophis variegatus (Schmidt, 1926)

Species of snake

The Mona racer (Borikenophis variegatus) is a species of snake in the family Colubridae that is endemic to Isla de Mona in Puerto Rico.
