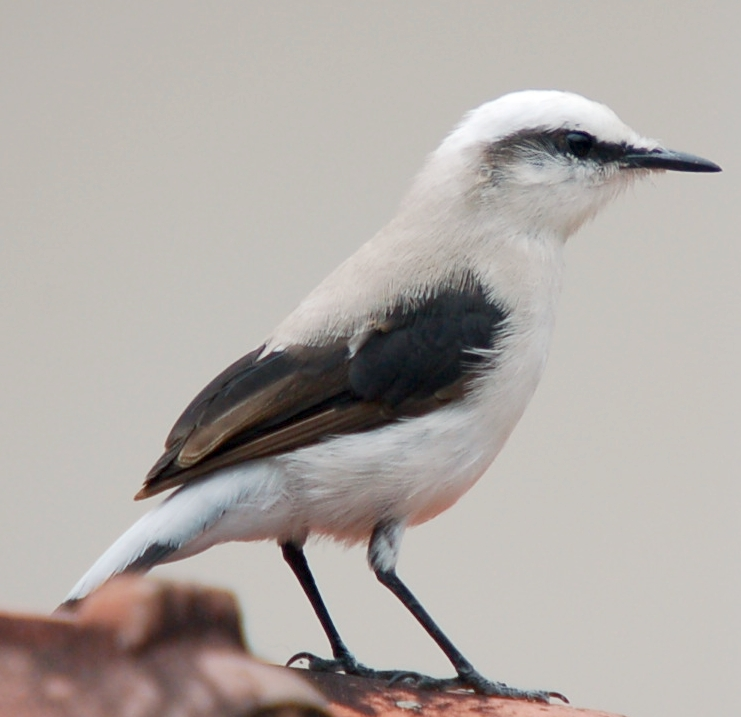
- Masked water tyrant Fluvicola nengeta

Scientific classification
- Kingdom: Animalia
- Phylum: Chordata
- Class: Aves
- Order: Passeriformes
- Family: Tyrannidae
- Genus: Fluvicola; Swainson, 1827

Type species
- Fluvicola cursoria = Lanius nengeta Swainson, 1832

= Fluvicola =

Genus of birds

Fluvicola is a genus of birds in the tyrant flycatcher family Tyrannidae.

The genus was introduced by the English naturalist William Swainson in 1827. He designated the type species as the masked water tyrant (Fluvicola nengeta) in 1831. The genus name is derived from a combination of Latin fluvius meaning "river" and -cola meaning "dweller".

== Species ==
The genus contains the following three species:

Image	Scientific name	Common name	Distribution
	Fluvicola pica	Pied water tyrant	from Panama and Trinidad south to Bolivia and Argentina.
	Fluvicola albiventer	Black-backed water tyrant	central and northeastern Brazil and south through Bolivia, Paraguay, northern Argentina and Uruguay; also eastern Peru
	Fluvicola nengeta	Masked water tyrant	eastern and southeastern Brazil, western Ecuador, and coastal border regions of northwest Peru
