= List of critically endangered species in the United States =

An IUCN Red List critically endangered (CR or sometimes CE) species is one that has been categorized by the International Union for Conservation of Nature as facing an extremely high risk of extinction in the wild. As of 2021, of the 120,372 species currently tracked by the IUCN, there are 8,404 species that are considered to be critically endangered.

== Molluscs ==
- Louisiana pearlshell
- Fat Guam partula
- Tennessee pebblesnail

== Arthropods ==
- Nicrophorus americanus
- Franklin's bumblebee

== Chordates ==
=== Amphibians ===
- Mississippi gopher frog
- Dixie Valley toad
- Houston toad
- Amargosa toad
- Hot Creek toad

=== Mammals ===
- Rice's whale
- North Atlantic right whale
- Red wolf

=== Reptiles ===
==== Turtles and tortoises ====
- Hawksbill sea turtle
- Kemp's ridley sea turtle
- Bog turtle
- Flattened musk turtle
- Mojave Desert tortoise

==== Lizards ====
- Spondylurus semitaeniatus
- Spondylurus sloanii
- Spondylurus monitae
- Spondylurus magnacruzae
- Spondylurus culebrae
- Spondylurus spilonotus
- Anolis roosevelti

=== Fish ===
- Great hammerhead
- Sand tiger shark
- School shark
- Scalloped hammerhead
- Smalltail shark
- Oceanic whitetip shark
- Largetooth sawfish
- Devil's Hole pupfish
- Alabama cavefish
- Woundfin
- Moapa dace
- Duskytail darter
- Nassau grouper
- Spring pygmy sunfish
- Alabama sturgeon
- Delta smelt
- Marbled darter
- Consauga logperch
- White River spinedace
- Pygmy sculpin
- Roundnose grenadier
- Bonytail chub

=== Birds ===
- California condor
- Ivory-billed woodpecker
- Bryan's shearwater
- Newell's shearwater
- Guam rail
- Laysan duck
- ʻAkekeʻe
- Palila
- Olomaʻo
- Puaiohi
- Maui ʻakepa
- ʻAkikiki
- ʻAkohekohe
- Oʻahu ʻalauahio
- Maui parrotbill
- ʻŌʻū
- Nihoa finch
