= Old Jerusalem Island =

Island in British Virgin Islands

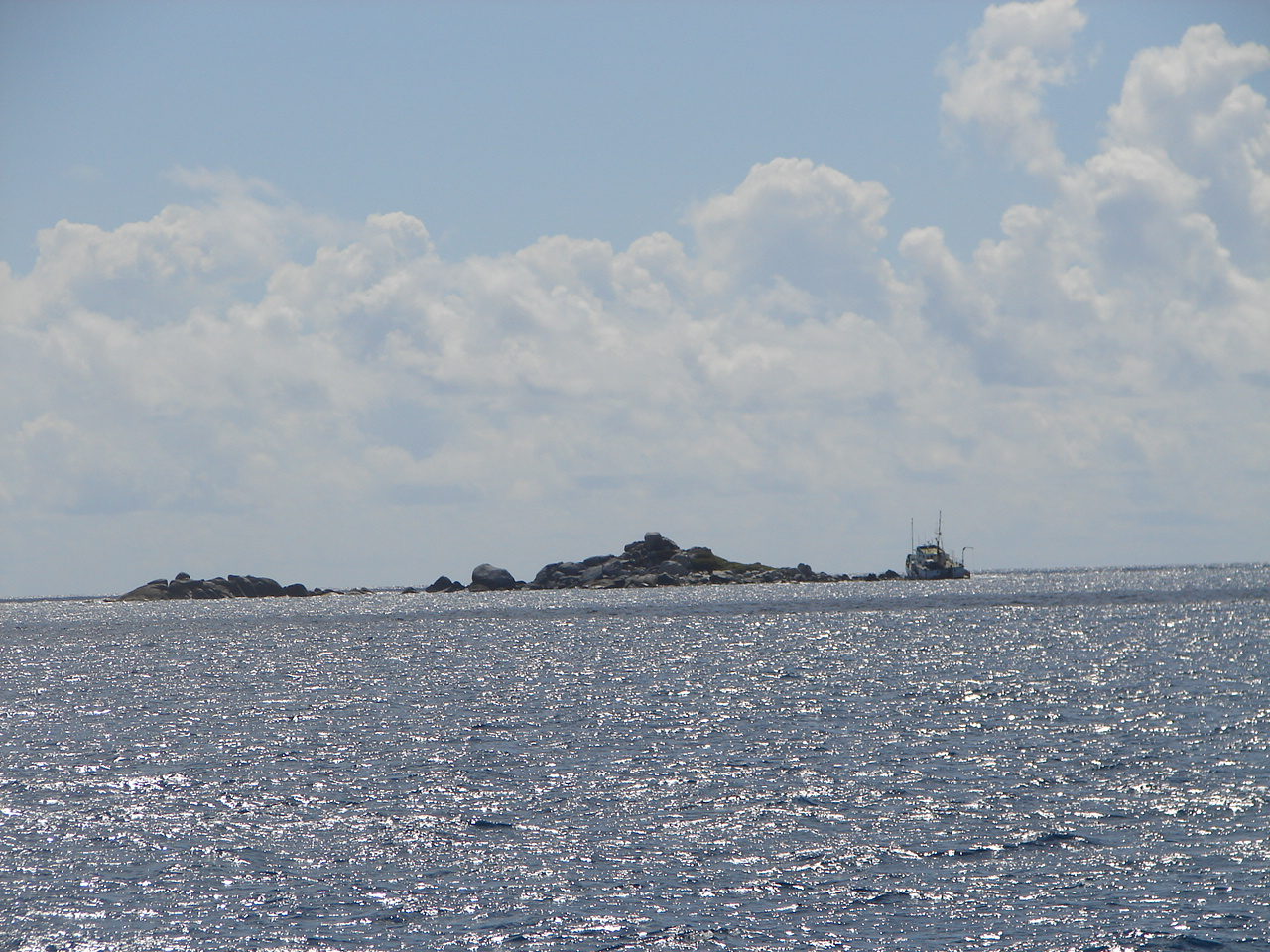
- Broken Jerusalem. A wrecked freighter lies off the western tip of the islets

- Location within British Virgin Islands Location within the Caribbean

Geography
- Location: Caribbean Sea
- Coordinates: 18°25′00″N 64°27′05″W
- Archipelago: Virgin Islands

Administration
- United Kingdom
- British Overseas Territory: British Virgin Islands

Additional information
- Time zone: AST (UTC-4)
- ISO code: VG

Broken Jerusalem Island (sometimes referred to as Old Jerusalem Island) is an uninhabited series of islets between Fallen Jerusalem Island and Round Rock in the British Virgin Islands in the Caribbean.

They are located south of Virgin Gorda.
