= Round Rock, British Virgin Islands =

Uninhabited island in the British Virgin Islands

Round Rock
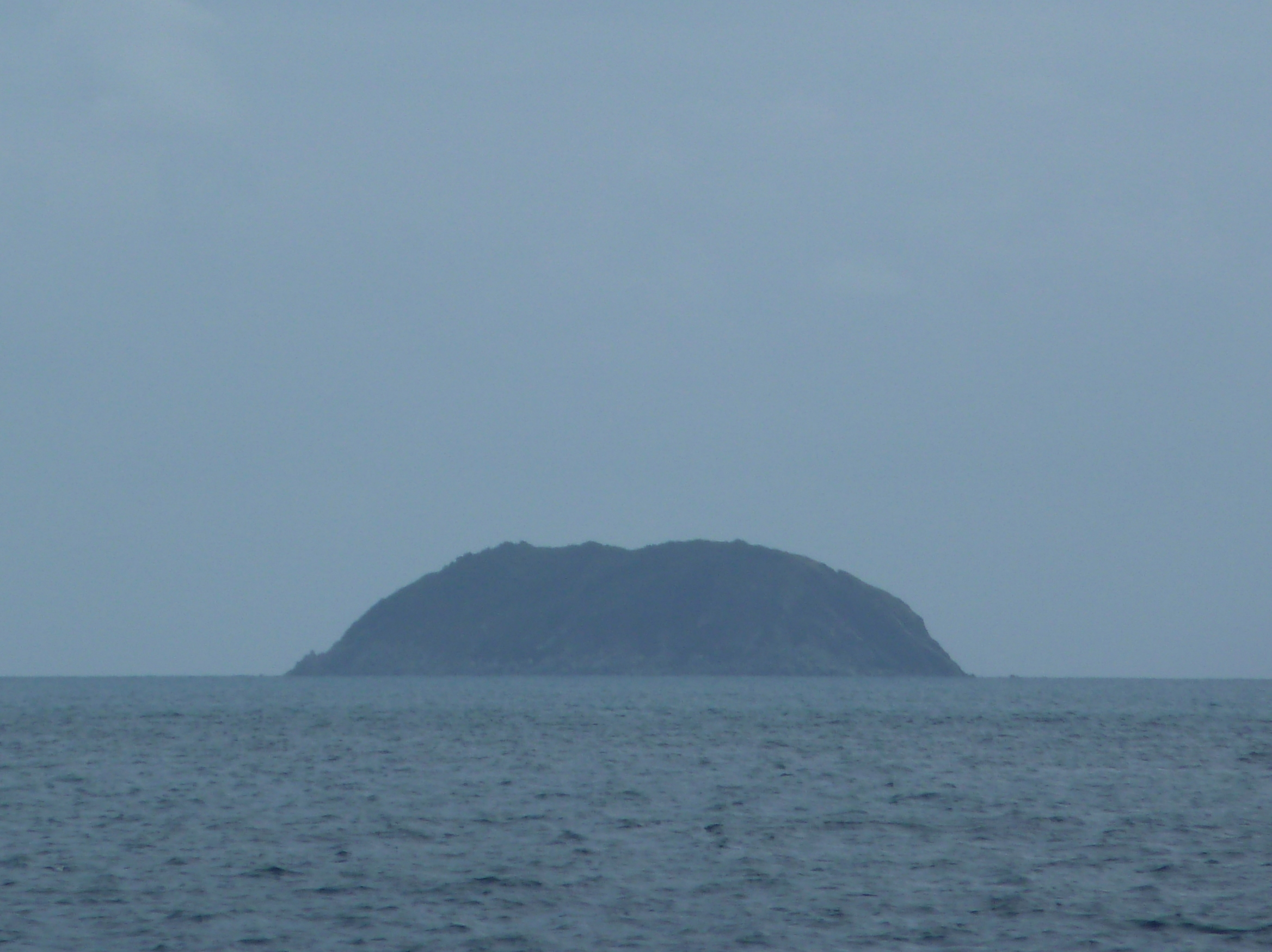
- Round Rock in 2010

- The location of Round Rock within the British Virgin Islands

- Location within British Virgin Islands Location within the Caribbean

Geography
- Location: Caribbean Sea
- Coordinates: 18.3985°N 64.4572°W
- Archipelago: Virgin Islands

Administration
- United Kingdom
- British Overseas Territory: British Virgin Islands

Demographics
- Population: 0

Additional information
- Time zone: AST (UTC-4)
- ISO code: VG

Round Rock is an uninhabited island in the British Virgin Islands, to the south of Virgin Gorda, east of Ginger Island and close to Fallen Jerusalem Island.

The island provides habitat for the crested anole (Anolis cristatellus wileyae), the common Puerto Rican ameiva (Pholidoscelis exsul exsul), the Lesser Virgin Islands Skink (Spondylurus semitaeniatus), and the big-scaled least gecko (Sphaerodactylus macrolepis).
