= Citico darter =

Conservation status
- Vulnerable (IUCN 3.1)

Scientific classification
- Kingdom: Animalia
- Phylum: Chordata
- Class: Actinopterygii
- Order: Perciformes
- Family: Percidae
- Genus: Etheostoma
- Species: E. sitikuense

Binomial name
- Etheostoma sitikuense Blanton, 2008

Species of fish

The Citico darter (Etheostoma sitikuense) is a threatened species of freshwater ray-finned fish, a darter from the subfamily Etheostomatinae, part of the family Percidae, which also contains the perches, ruffes and pikeperches. It is native to Tennessee. This species was formerly subsumed within Etheostoma percnurum (duskytail darter). The E. percnurum group now consists of four distinct species: E. percnurum, E. marmorpinnum (marbled darter), E. lemniscatum (tuxedo darter), and E. sitikuense.

== Geographic distribution ==
The Citico darter is an endangered species found only in several isolated locations in east Tennessee: Abrams Creek, Citico Creek, and the Tellico River. The fish was extirpated from Abrams Creek in the 1950s when the stream was chemically treated to remove all rough fish viewed as competition for the rainbow trout. The species was presumably widespread throughout the upper Tennessee River and parts of the Cumberland River drainages. Presently, the Citico Creek population occupies about 3.5 miles (5.6 km) below a US Forest Service boundary and was the source population for propagation and restocking of Abrams Creek and the Tellico River. The Citico darter is thought to have been found lower down in Citico Creek prior to the construction of the Tellico Dam. In other parts of its range, the isolated distribution is thought to have been caused by habitat loss due to siltation and reductions in water quality, and dam construction also probably played a role due to the loss of habitat, and fish no longer being able to move freely throughout drainages, Citico Creek and Abrams Creek are separated by the Chilhowee and Tellico reservoirs.

== Ecology ==
The Citico darter is a benthic species inhabiting riffle habitat in moderate-gradient streams under cobble and small boulder substrates. Large flat rocks are used for nesting cover, with the eggs being attached underneath. Predation on adults occurs mostly from the smallmouth bass (Micropterus dolomieu), nests and juvenile fish may be preyed upon by a host of different species. This fish's diet consists of midges, black fly, and caddis larvae; mayfly and stonefly nymphs; amphipods; and isopods. It requires cool, clear-running water, streams with a moderate gradient and riffle habitat with cobble and small boulder substrates. Sedimentation due to bank erosion, agricultural runoff, and poor land-use practices are the biggest threats to the Citico darter. All of its range in Citico Creek flows through private property where buffer zones and streamside habitat are not monitored or regulated.

== Life history ==
The Citico darter reaches around 2.5 inches (6.4 cm) and has a lifespan of up to two years. Breeding takes place from late April through June. Males establish territories under large rocks in the same pools they inhabit during the rest of the year. Males clear silt and debris and then emerge from the nest and court passing females by erecting their fins, tail wagging, and nipping. Females lay an average of 26 eggs, clutch sizes can range from seven to 40 and can lay six clutches in a breeding season. Observed nests contained an average of 79 (23–200) eggs, suggesting several females may lay eggs in the same nest. Eggs hatched in 11 to 14 days and the hatched fish reached sexual maturity after one year.

== Conservation ==
The Citico darter is still listed as a threatened species, but it represents the most stable member of the E. percnurum group because it is now found in three streams in the Little Tennessee River system. Captive propagation and stocking is still taking place in Abrams Creek and in the Tellico River, but the populations there appear to be stable and reproducing naturally. Current management of the species includes captive propagation and introduction by Conservation Fisheries, Inc. (CFI) into Abrams and Citico Creeks, as well as the Tellico River.
