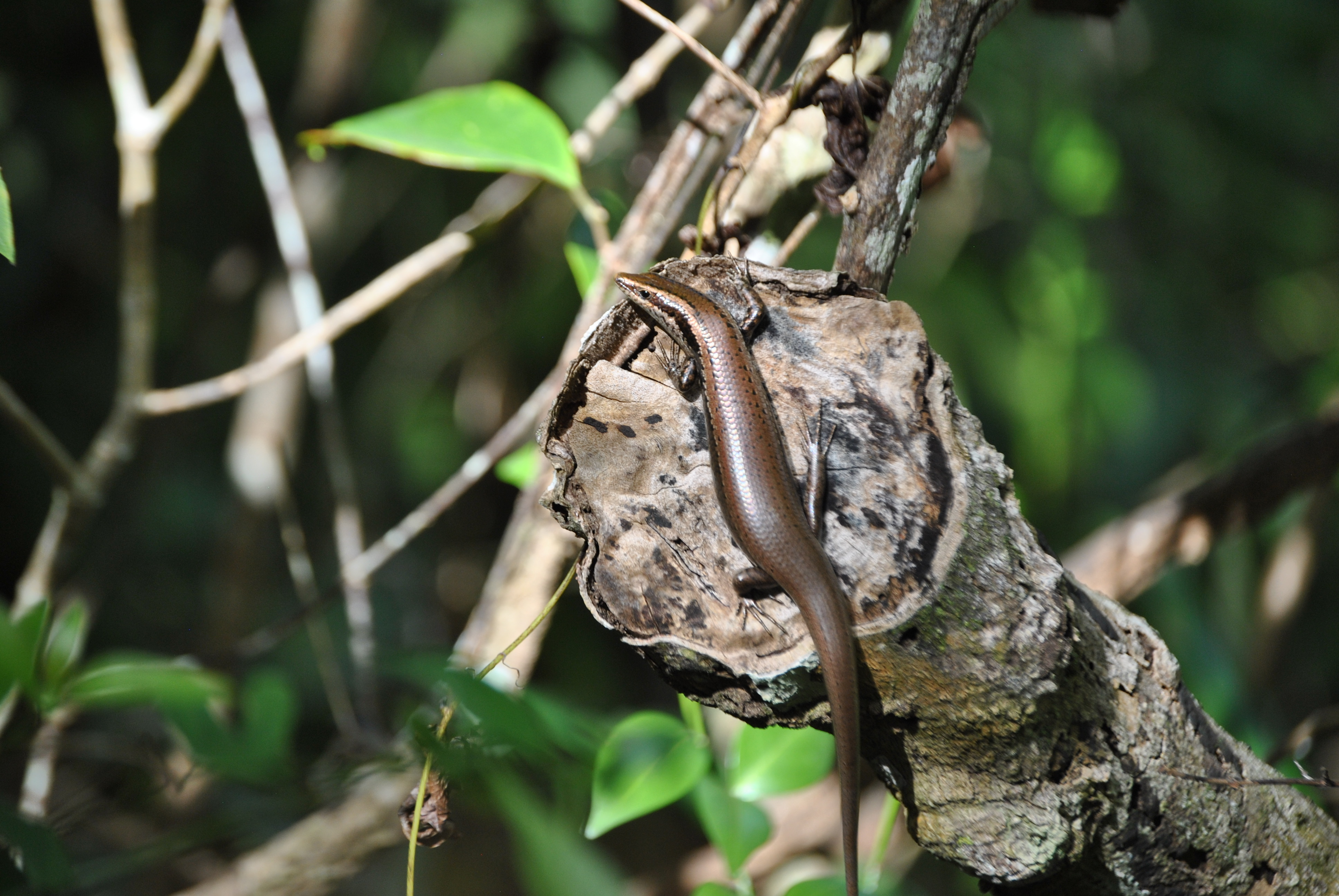

Conservation status
- Endangered (IUCN 3.1)

Scientific classification
- Kingdom: Animalia
- Phylum: Chordata
- Class: Reptilia
- Order: Squamata
- Family: Scincidae
- Genus: Spondylurus
- Species: S. nitidus

Binomial name
- Spondylurus nitidus (Garman, 1887)

= Spondylurus nitidus =

Species of lizard

The Puerto Rican skink (Spondylurus nitidus), known locally as Santa Lucía, or Lucía, for brevity, is a species of skink found in Puerto Rico.
