= Spondylurus macleani =

Conservation status
- Critically Endangered (IUCN 3.1)

Scientific classification
- Kingdom: Animalia
- Phylum: Chordata
- Class: Reptilia
- Order: Squamata
- Family: Scincidae
- Genus: Spondylurus
- Species: S. macleani

Binomial name
- Spondylurus macleani (G. Mayer & Lazell, 2000)

Synonyms
- Mabuya macleani G. Mayer & Lazell, 2000

Species of lizard

Spondylurus macleani, also known commonly as the Carrot Rock skink and the slippery back, is a species of lizard in the subfamily Mabuyinae of the family Scincidae. The species is endemic to the islet of Carrot Rock in the British Virgin Islands.

== Etymology ==
The specific name, macleani, is in honor of American evolutionary biologist William P. Maclean III (1943–1991), who was Professor and Department Chair, University of the Virgin Islands, St. Thomas, U.S. Virgin Islands.

== Habitat ==
The preferred natural habitat of Spondylurus macleani is rocky areas with clumps of cacti and Coccoloba uvifera (sea grape).

== Reproduction ==
Spondylurus macleani is ovoviviparous.
