= Spondylurus anegadae =

Conservation status
- Critically endangered, possibly extinct (IUCN 3.1)

Scientific classification
- Kingdom: Animalia
- Phylum: Chordata
- Class: Reptilia
- Order: Squamata
- Family: Scincidae
- Genus: Spondylurus
- Species: S. anegadae

Binomial name
- Spondylurus anegadae Hedges & Conn, 2012

Species of lizard

Spondylurus anegadae, the Anegada skink, is a species of skink found on Anegada in the British Virgin Islands.
