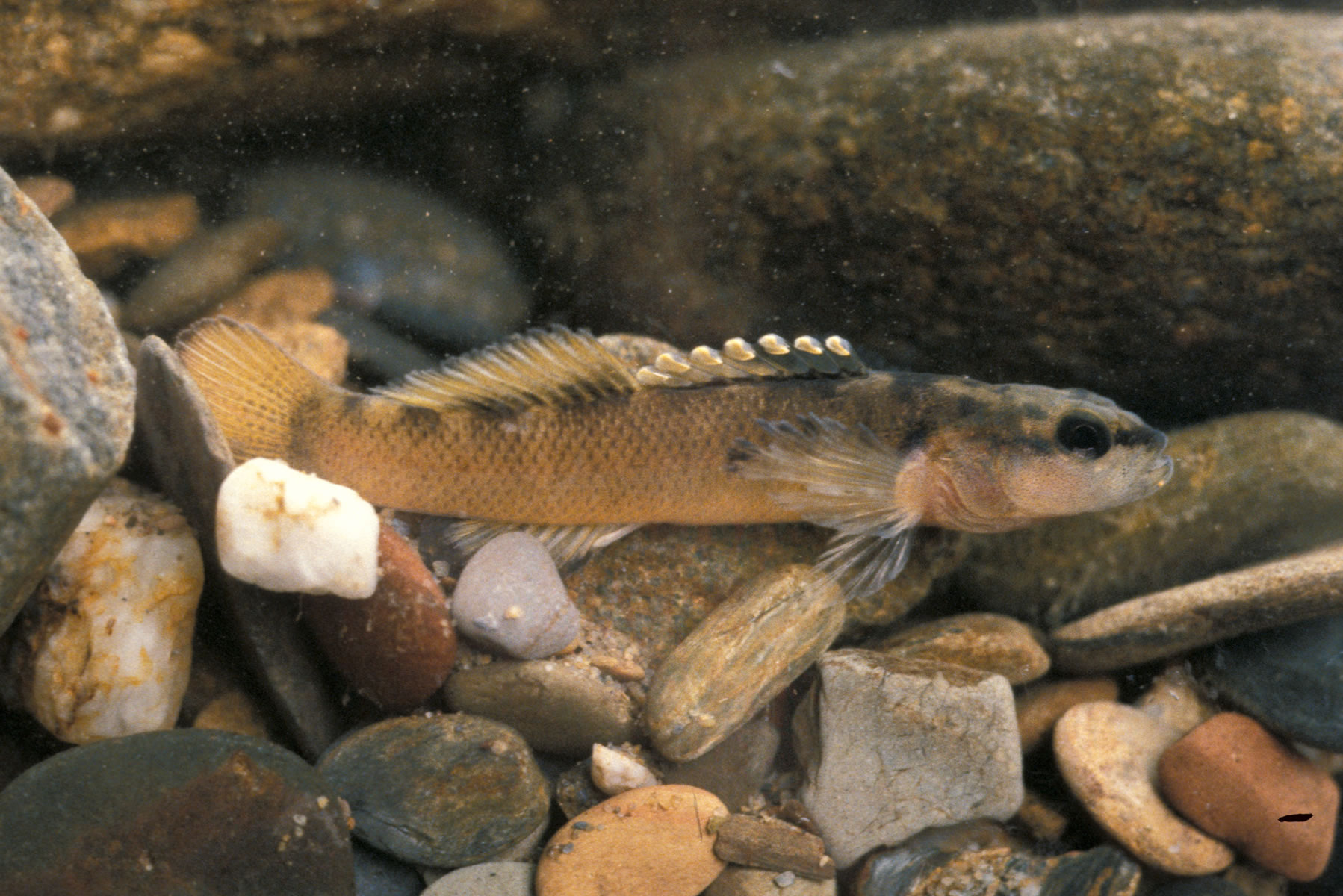

Conservation status
- Critically Endangered (IUCN 3.1)

Scientific classification
- Kingdom: Animalia
- Phylum: Chordata
- Class: Actinopterygii
- Order: Perciformes
- Family: Percidae
- Genus: Etheostoma
- Species: E. percnurum

Binomial name
- Etheostoma percnurum R. E. Jenkins, 1994

= Duskytail darter =

Species of fish

The duskytail darter (Etheostoma percnurum) is a species of freshwater ray-finned fish, a darter from the subfamily Etheostomatinae, part of the family Percidae, which also contains the perches, ruffes and pikeperches. It is endemic to the eastern United States where it is native to the upper Tennessee River drainage in Virginia. It was federally listed as an endangered species of the United States in 1993, shortly before it was formally described as a new species.

In 2008, examination of the morphology of this species led researchers to divide it into four species, describing the Citico darter (Etheostoma sitikuense), the marbled darter (Etheostoma marmorpinnum), and the tuxedo darter (Etheostoma lemniscatum) as new. Because E. percnurum carries the endangered species status, the three new species may be given that status.

These fish are threatened by the impoundment of waterways, increased silt, logging, coal mining, pollution, and disease.
