= Spondylurus lineolatus =

Conservation status
- Critically endangered, possibly extinct (IUCN 3.1)

Scientific classification
- Kingdom: Animalia
- Phylum: Chordata
- Class: Reptilia
- Order: Squamata
- Suborder: Scinciformata
- Infraorder: Scincomorpha
- Family: Mabuyidae
- Genus: Spondylurus
- Species: S. lineolatus

Binomial name
- Spondylurus lineolatus (Noble, 1933)

Species of lizard

The Hispaniolan ten-lined skink (Spondylurus lineolatus) is a species of skink endemic to Hispaniola (both Haiti and the Dominican Republic).
