= Spondylurus haitiae =

Conservation status
- Critically endangered, possibly extinct (IUCN 3.1)

Scientific classification
- Kingdom: Animalia
- Phylum: Chordata
- Class: Reptilia
- Order: Squamata
- Family: Scincidae
- Genus: Spondylurus
- Species: S. haitiae

Binomial name
- Spondylurus haitiae Hedges & Conn, 2012

Species of lizard

Spondylurus haitiae, the Hispaniolan four-lined skink, is a species of skink endemic to Haiti. It is only known from its type locality where it was last collected at around 1857–1858. Considering the extensive field work in the area and the loss of suitable habitat, it is likely that this species is extinct.
