= Spondylurus martinae =

Conservation status
- Critically endangered, possibly extinct (IUCN 3.1)

Scientific classification
- Kingdom: Animalia
- Phylum: Chordata
- Class: Reptilia
- Order: Squamata
- Family: Scincidae
- Genus: Spondylurus
- Species: S. martinae

Binomial name
- Spondylurus martinae Hedges & Conn, 2012

Species of lizard

Spondylurus martinae, the Saint Martin skink, is a species of skink found in Saint Martin.
