= Spondylurus fulgidus =

Conservation status
- Endangered (IUCN 3.1)

Scientific classification
- Kingdom: Animalia
- Phylum: Chordata
- Class: Reptilia
- Order: Squamata
- Family: Scincidae
- Genus: Spondylurus
- Species: S. fulgidus

Binomial name
- Spondylurus fulgidus Cope, 1862

Species of lizard

The Jamaican skink (Spondylurus fulgidus) is a species of skink found in Jamaica.
