= Culebrita Lighthouse =

Spanish-era lighthouse in Culebra, Puerto Rico

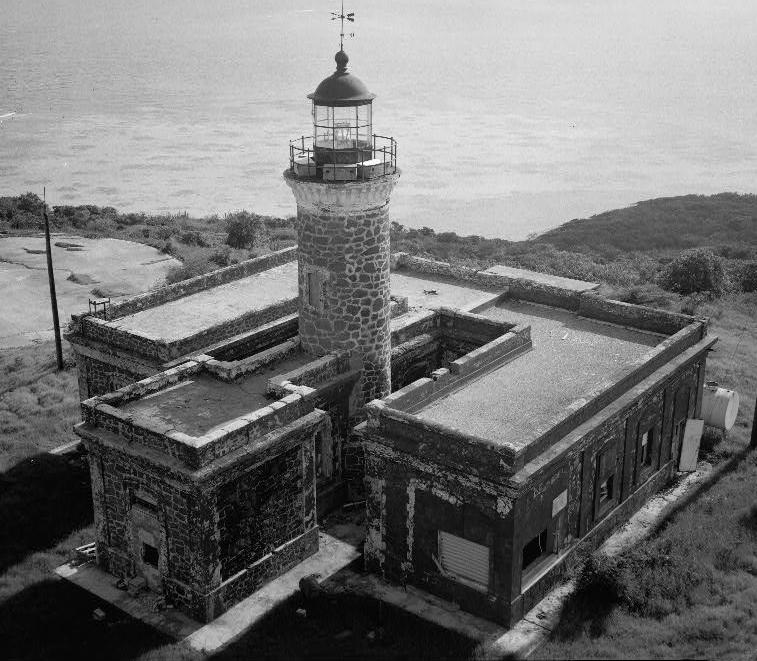
- Photograph taken in 1978
- Location: Culebrita, Culebra, Puerto Rico
- Coordinates: 18°18′49″N 65°13′39″W

Tower
- Construction: 1882
- Heritage: National Register of Historic Places listed place

Light
- First lit: 1886
- Deactivated: 1975
- Faro Isla de Culebrita
- U.S. National Register of Historic Places
- Puerto Rico Historic Sites and Zones
- Nearest city: Culebra, Puerto Rico
- Area: 1.5 acres (0.61 ha)
- Built: 1886
- MPS: Lighthouse System of Puerto Rico TR
- NRHP reference No.: 81000686
- Added to NRHP: October 22, 1981

Culebrita Lighthouse (Spanish: Faro Culebrita or Faro de Culebrita) is the only remaining Spanish-era structure in the Culebra archipelago. Construction of the lighthouse began on September 25, 1882, and was completed on February 25, 1886. The Spanish Crown built the lighthouse to help secure its claim over the main island of Culebra. It is the most eastern light outside mainland Puerto Rico. It guided navigation through the Virgin Passage and the Vieques Sound connecting in the Puerto Rico Light System with the Cape San Juan Light.

It is located on Culebrita, a mile-long, half-a-mile-wide key off Culebra, an island-municipality of Puerto Rico.

It was one of the oldest operating lighthouses in the Caribbean until 1975 when the U.S. Navy and Coast Guard closed the facility. The United States Coast Guard has replaced the lighthouse with a solar powered light beacon.

The Culebrita Lighthouse was registered on the U.S. National Register of Historic Places on October 22, 1981, and to the Puerto Rico Register of Historic Sites and Zones in 2001; however, no work has been done to maintain the facility. In 1989, Hurricane Hugo caused extensive damage, and in 1995 the tower was destroyed by Hurricane Marilyn. The Culebra Foundation, starting in 1994, has tried to attract local and federal attention to save the lighthouse, but they have had little success. The lighthouse is in danger of collapsing.

== Gallery ==
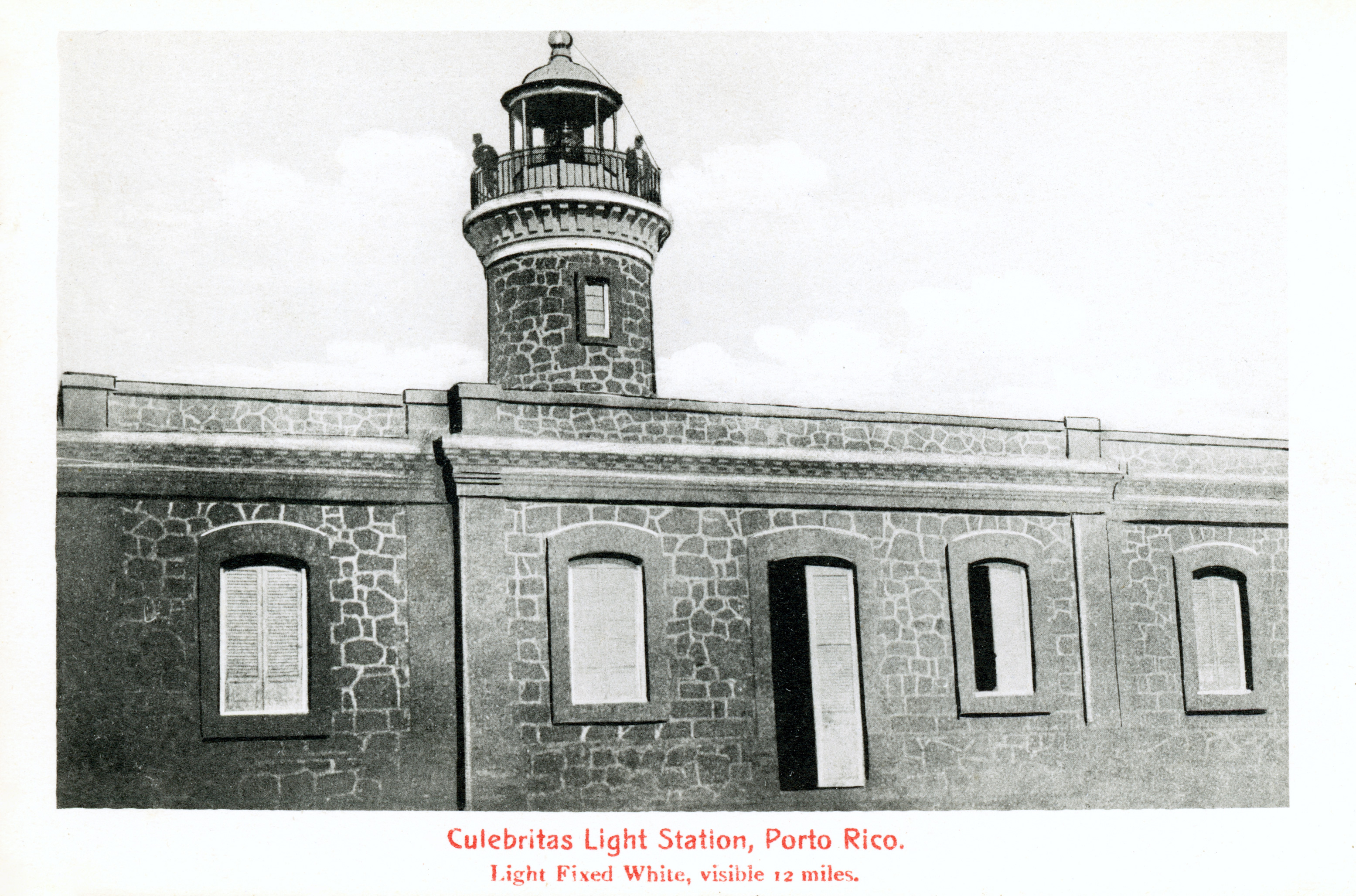
The lighthouse in 1913

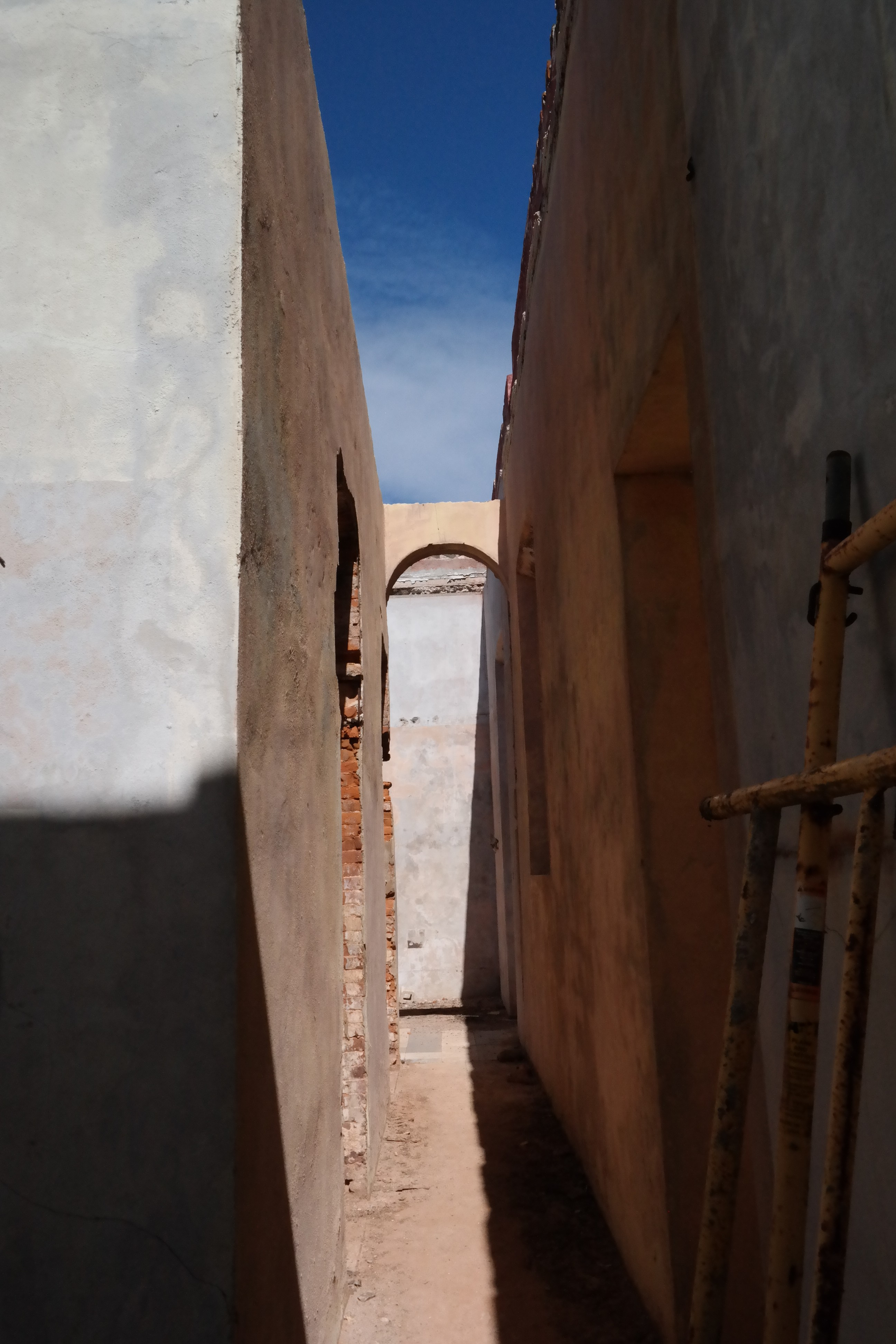
Inside lighthouse

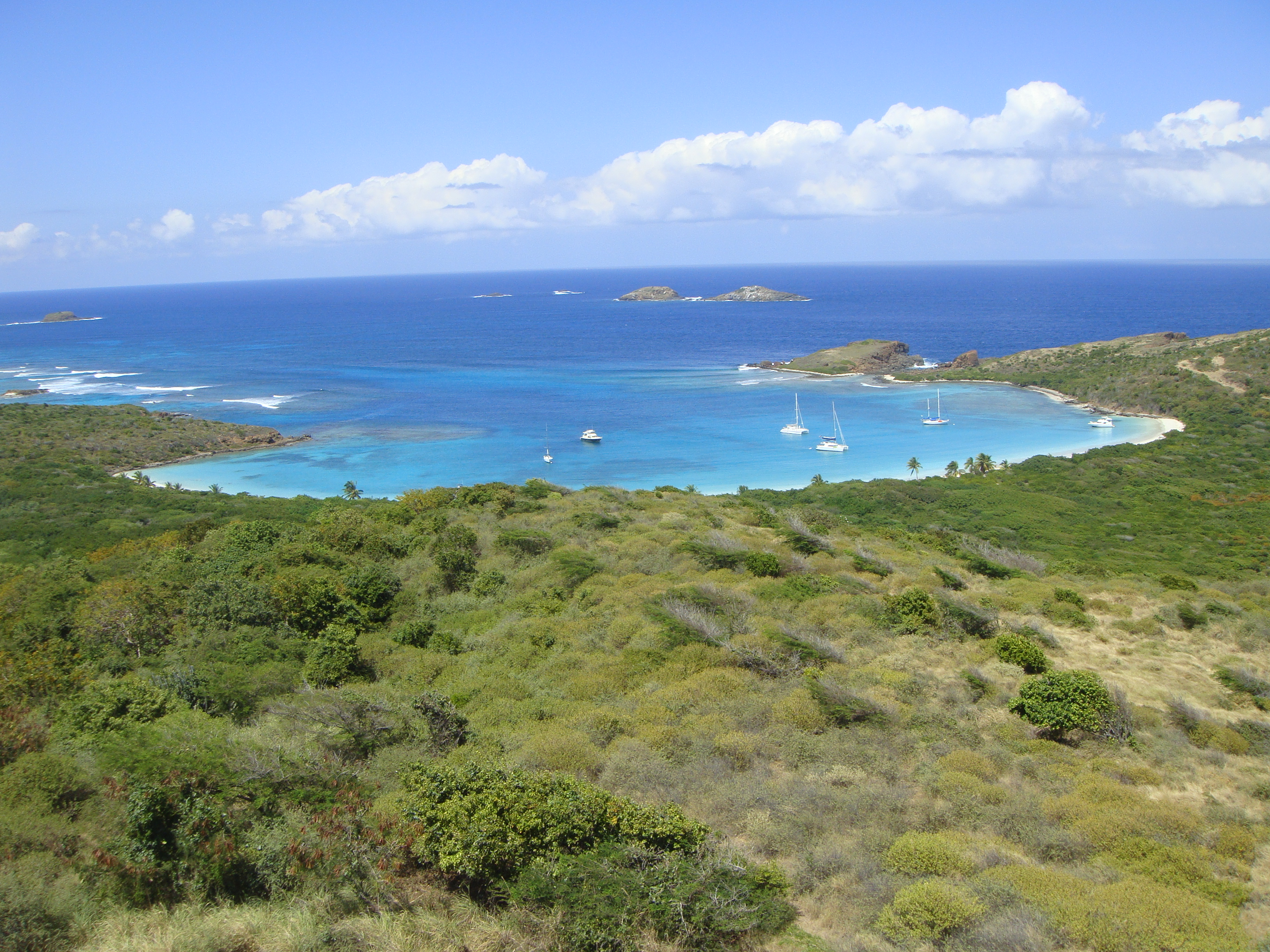
North Anchorage View from Faro Tower

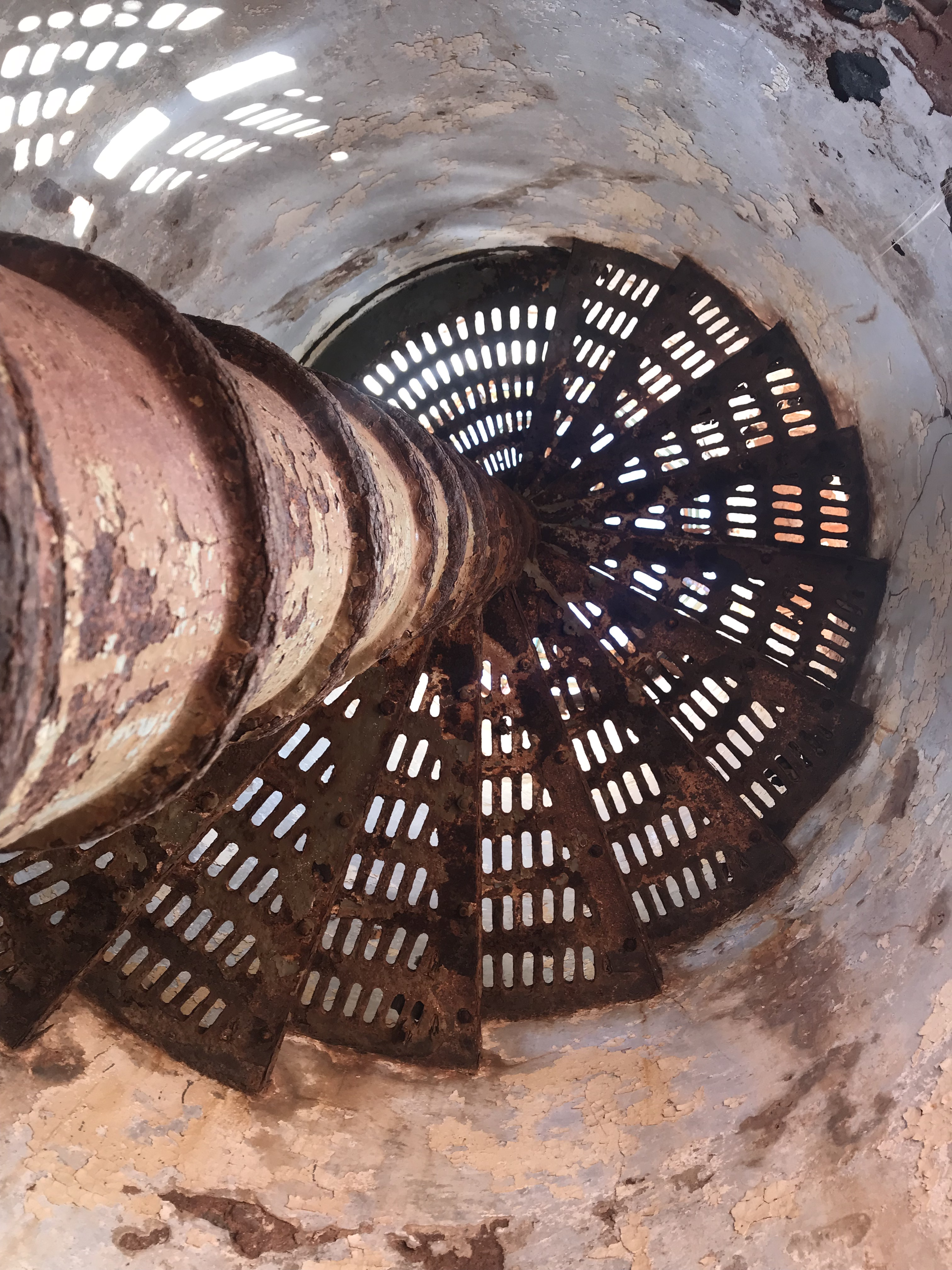
Stairway inside, 2018

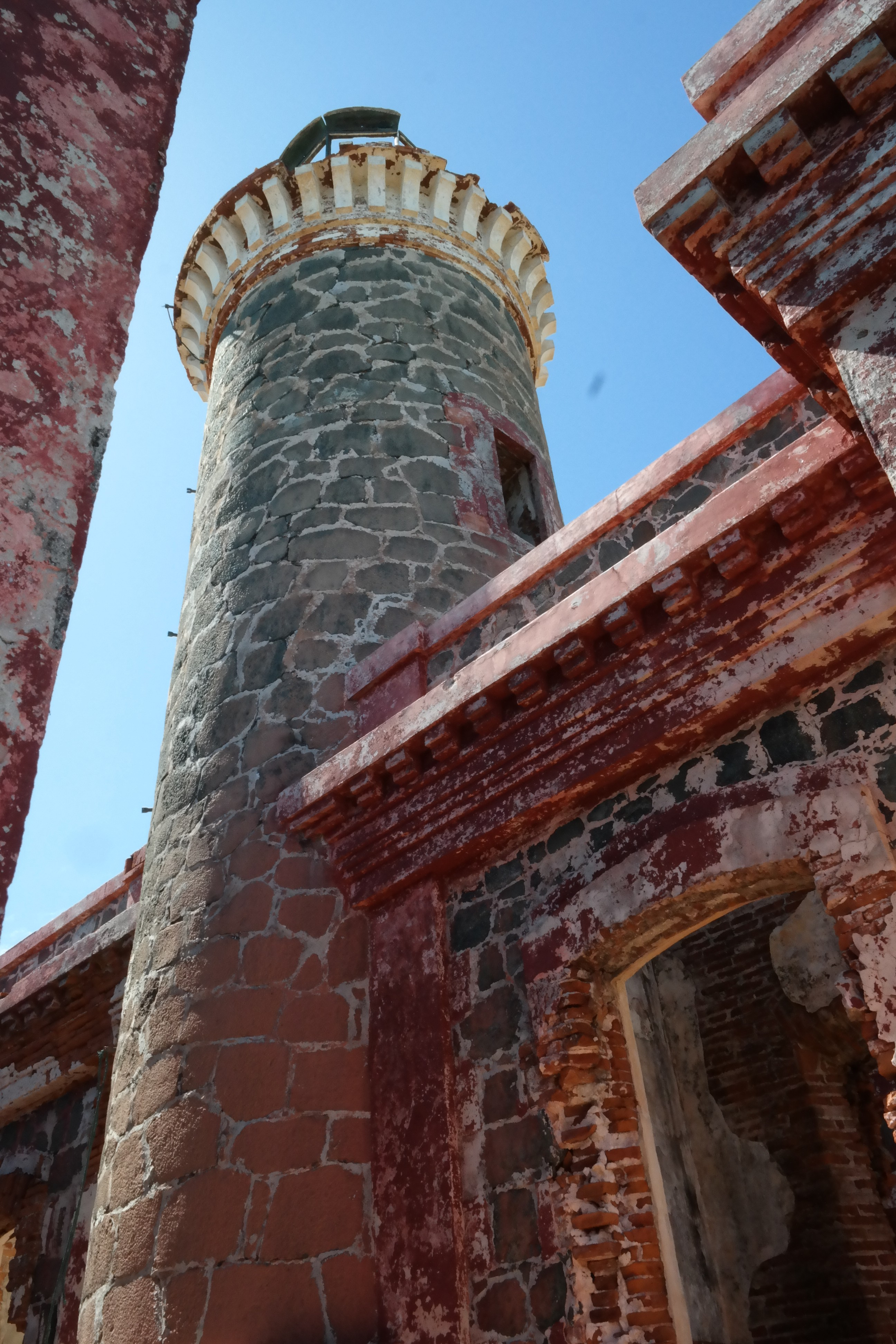
Facade of El Faro Culebrita, 2014

== See also ==
- List of lighthouses in Puerto Rico
