= Fraile, Culebra, Puerto Rico =

Barrio of Puerto Rico

Fraile
- Barrio
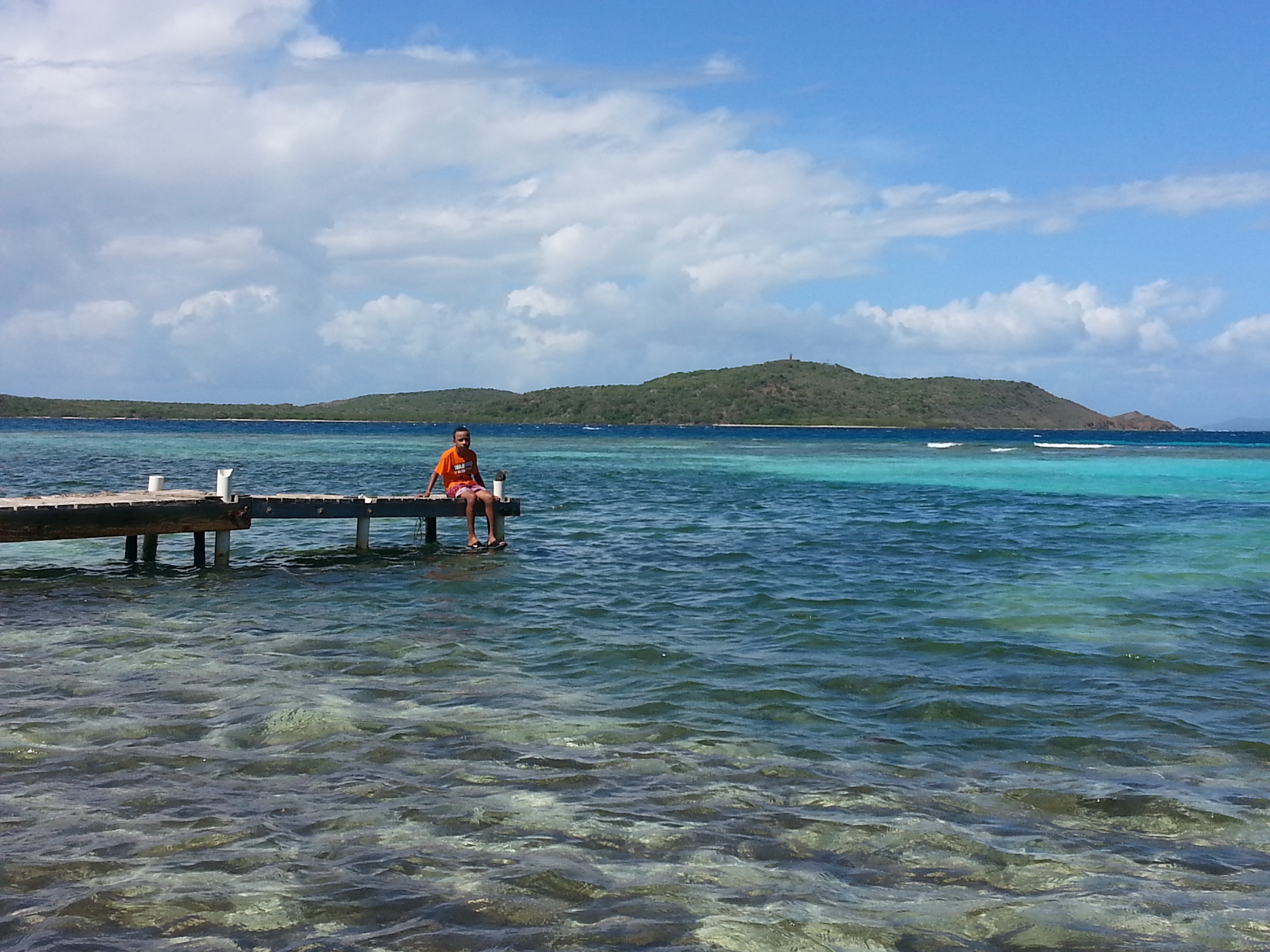
- Boy on pier in Fraile

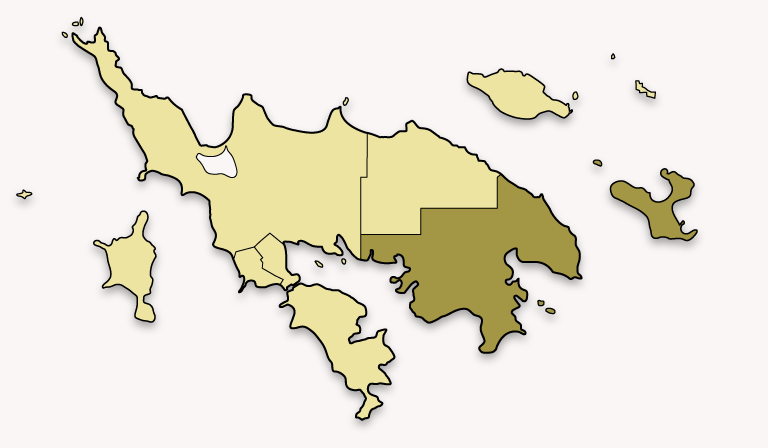

- Location within Puerto Rico
- Coordinates: 18°17′51″N 65°15′00″W
- Commonwealth: Puerto Rico
- Municipality: Culebra

Area
  - Total: 35.41 sq mi (91.7 km^{2})
  - Land: 3.18 sq mi (8.2 km^{2})
  - Water: 32.23 sq mi (83.5 km^{2})
- Elevation: 0 ft (0 m)

Population (2010)
  - Total: 42
  - Density: 13.2/sq mi (5.1/km^{2})
- Source: 2010 Census
- Time zone: UTC−4 (AST)
- ZIP Code: 00775

Fraile is a barrio in the island-municipality of Culebra, Puerto Rico. Its population in 2010 was 42.

Historical population
Census	Pop.	Note	%±
1930	87		—
1940	134		54.0%
1950	89		−33.6%
1960	18		−79.8%
1970	8		−55.6%
1980	9		12.5%
1990	22		144.4%
2000	51		131.8%
2010	42		−17.6%
U.S. Decennial Census; 1899 (shown as 1900) 1910-1930; 1930-1950 1980-2000 2010

== Sectors ==
Barrios (which are, in contemporary times, roughly comparable to minor civil divisions) in turn are further subdivided into smaller local populated place areas/units called sectores (sectors in English). The types of sectores may vary, from normally sector to urbanización to reparto to barriada to residencial, among others.

Culebrita is a small island which is part of Fraile barrio.

The following sectors are in Fraile barrio:

Condominio Costa Bonita, Extensión Barriada Clark, Sector Alturas de Zoni, Sector Carenero, and Sector Las Vacas.

== Gallery ==
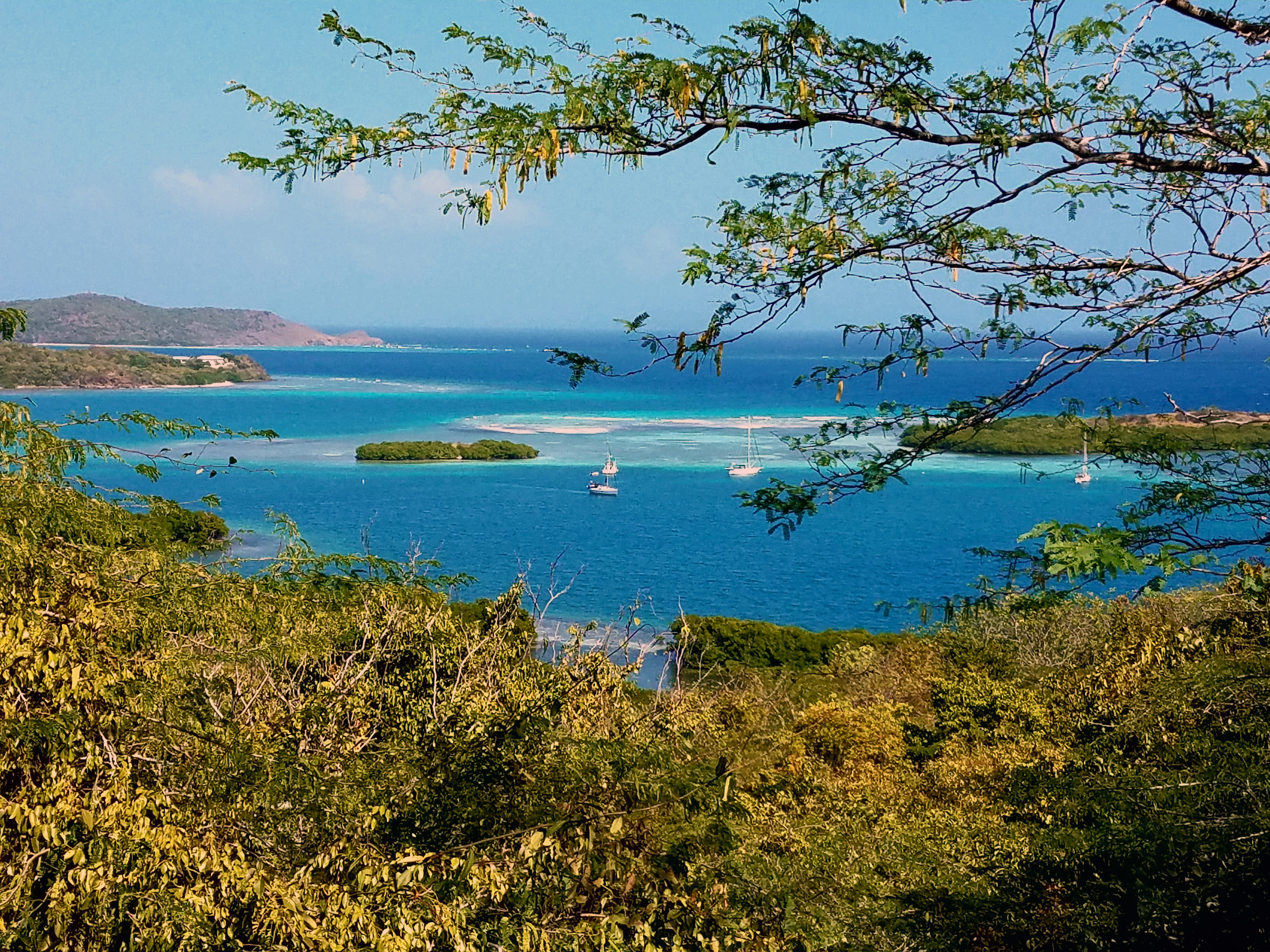
View of Fraile

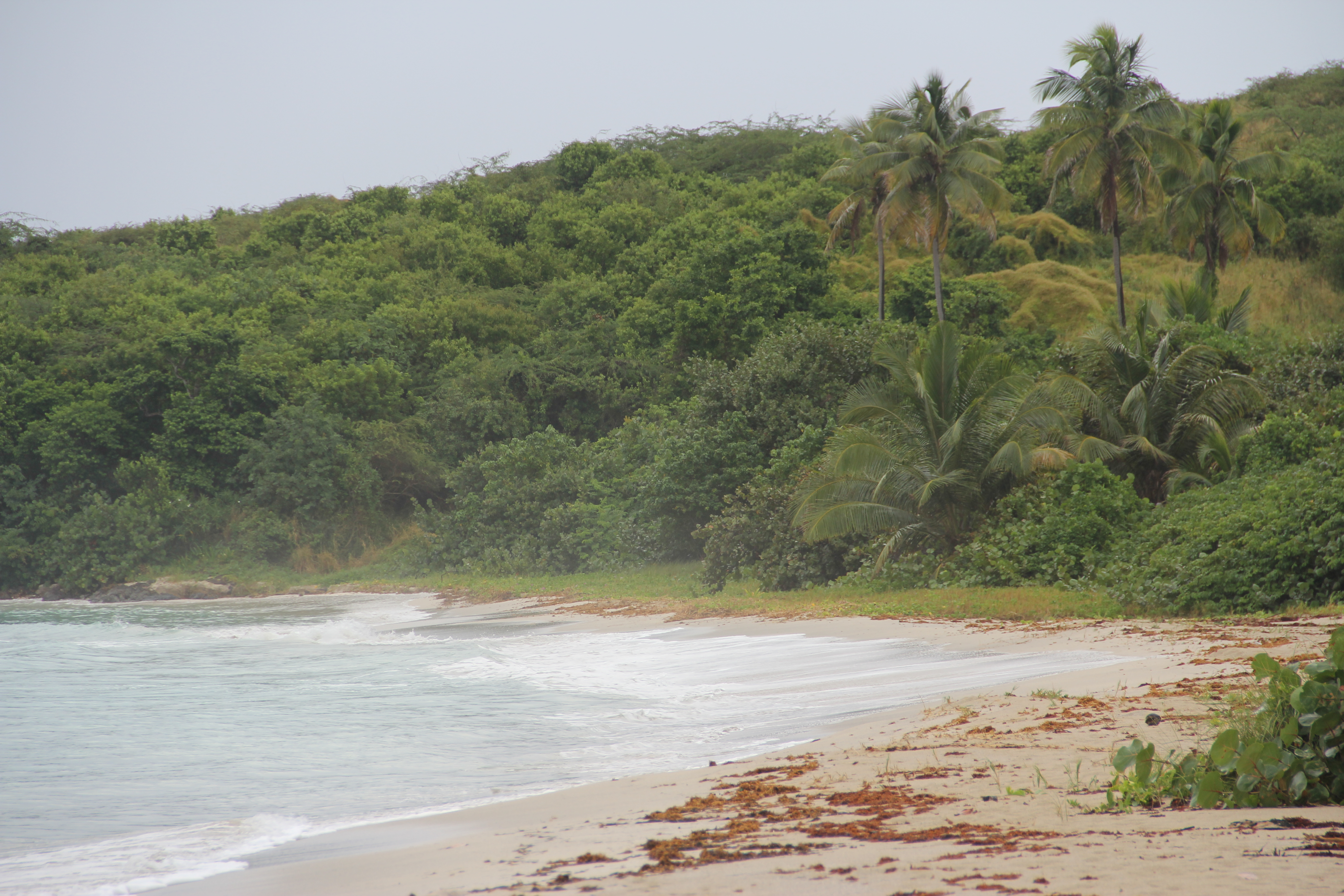
Zoni Beach in Fraile barrio, on Northeastern coast of Culebra

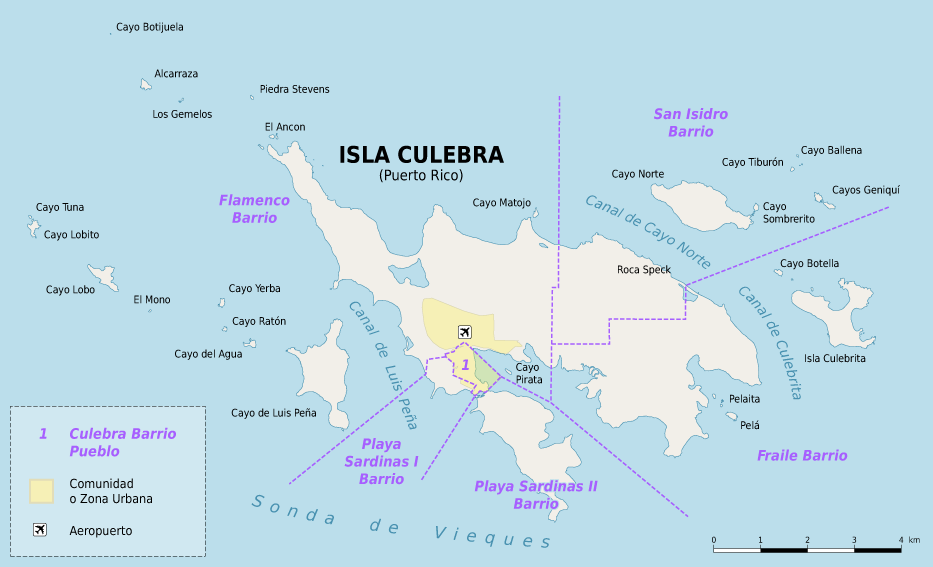
Location of Fraile in eastern Culebra

== See also ==
- List of communities in Puerto Rico
- List of barrios and sectors of Culebra, Puerto Rico
