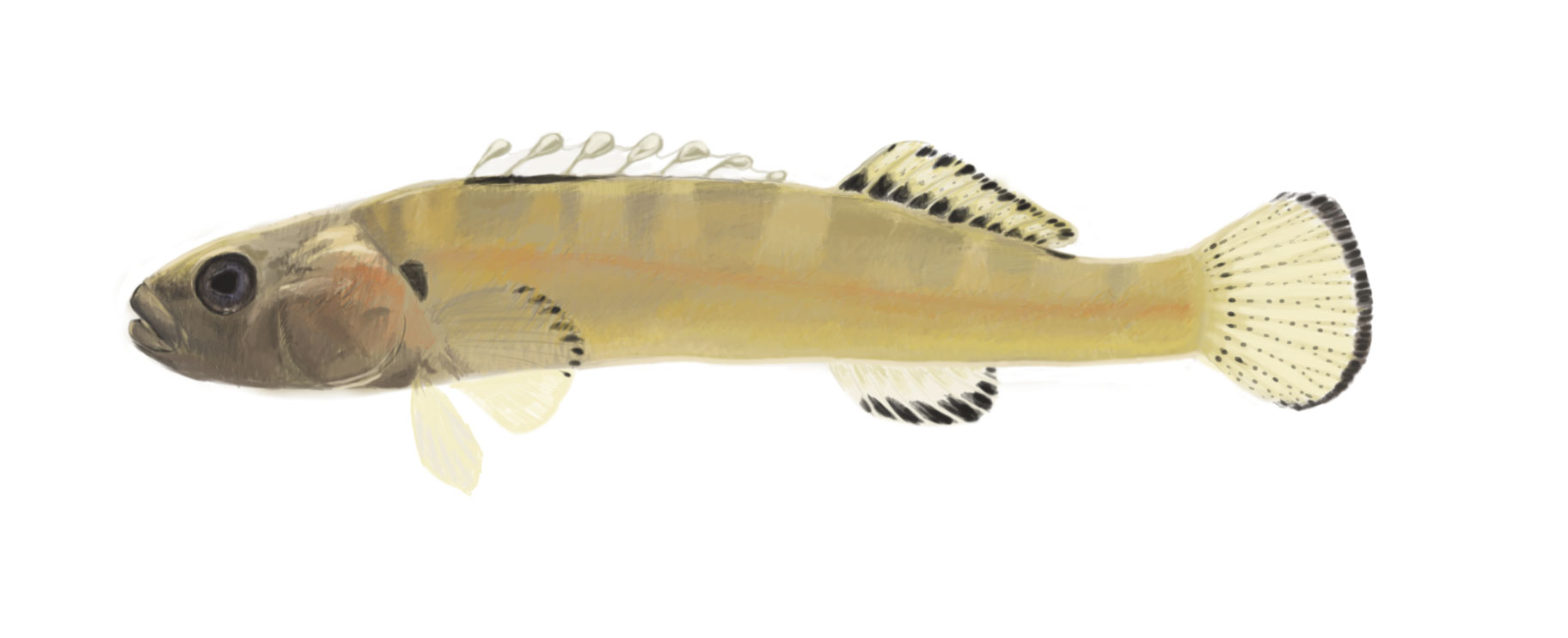

Conservation status
- Vulnerable (IUCN 3.1)

Scientific classification
- Kingdom: Animalia
- Phylum: Chordata
- Class: Actinopterygii
- Order: Perciformes
- Family: Percidae
- Genus: Etheostoma
- Species: E. lemniscatum

Binomial name
- Etheostoma lemniscatum Blanton, 2008

= Tuxedo darter =

Species of fish

The tuxedo darter (Etheostoma lemniscatum) is a species of freshwater ray-finned fish, a darter from the subfamily Etheostomatinae, part of the family Percidae, which also contains the perches, ruffes and pikeperches. It is endemic to the Southeast United States in the Cumberland River system.

== Classification ==
Etheostoma lemniscatum was described only in 2008. It was originally considered a duskytail darter (E. percnurum), but E. percnurum was determined a species complex in 2008 by R.E. Blanton and R.E. Jenkins.

== Appearance and anatomy ==
It is visually distinguished from other species of the E. percnurum complex by a more posterior anal fin.

== Geographic distribution ==
Originally, the tuxedo darter (then E. percnurum) was reported only in one location of the Big South Fork of the Cumberland River, which flows from north-central Tennessee to McCreary County, Kentucky. Prior to 1995, the mouth of Station Camp Creek in Scott County, Tennessee contained the only known tuxedo darter population. However, in 2000 D.J. Eisenhour and B.M. Burr discovered six additional sites spanning nineteen kilometers from Station Camp Creek (the original site) to Bear Creek in McCreary County, Kentucky. They estimated the population at 300 to 600 individuals. There are two more sites upstream that have been discovered but data has yet to be published. The Cumberland River is the primary drainage of the Cumberland Plateau, which sits between the Highland Rim and the southern Appalachian Mountains. The plateau contains well-drained soil that is acidic and infertile. The river has eroded through a sandstone crust to its limestone base. The area has a history of industrial and agricultural practices, such as coal mining, that have reduced habitat for all wildlife. However, the region is now protected by the Big South Fork National River and Recreation Area.

== Ecology and life history ==
The tuxedo darter is a benthic species with cryptic coloration. Tuxedo darters live only one to two years and do not venture far from where they were born. The E. percnurum species complex is unique within its subgenus (Catonotus) because its species prefer larger streams and moderately large rivers. The tuxedo darter is an insectivore that feeds on microcrustaceans and chironomid larvae. It may also feed on heptageniid nymphs on the underside of rocks. They become sexually mature when they are greater than one year old and at least 39 millimeters (1.5 in) long. Research on the citico darter (Etheostoma sitikuense), another member of the duskytail complex, has shown that it can produce five to seven clutches per year with clutch sizes recorded up to 101 eggs. The citico darter spawns at water temperatures between 17 and 24 °C (63 and 75 °F). The tuxedo darter is known to spawn underneath slabrocks or boulders. The tuxedo darter prefers river sections that are 23.3 to 61.3 meters (76 to 201 ft) wide and 39.2 to 89.2 centimeters (15.4 to 35.1 in) deep. Common substrates for the species are slabrock, cobble, and boulders where they build nests up to 50 meters (160 ft) upstream which contain the eggs of one or more females but are guarded by a single male. The tuxedo darter clusters its eggs.

== Conservation ==
Etheostoma percnurum was first recorded in the Cumberland River in 1976. The four separate populations, now four different species, were listed as federally endangered in April 1993. As described above, the Big South Fork region has a history of threatening agricultural, industrial, and environmental practices. Logging and coal mining dominated the region in the early 1900s. However, the BSFNRRA was created in 1974 by the National Park Service and became the first form of protection for the then unknown tuxedo darter. Conservation Fisheries Inc. (CFI) reports that there is no captive propagation program for the tuxedo darter, or are there any plans to create one. As in many aquatic species of the Southeast United States, the tuxedo darter is highly susceptible to sediment changes due to agricultural practices.
