= Spondylurus monae =

Conservation status
- Critically Endangered (IUCN 3.1)

Scientific classification
- Kingdom: Animalia
- Phylum: Chordata
- Class: Reptilia
- Order: Squamata
- Family: Scincidae
- Genus: Spondylurus
- Species: S. monae

Binomial name
- Spondylurus monae Hedges & Conn, 2012

Species of lizard

Spondylurus monae, the Mona skink, is a species of skink found on Isla de Mona in Puerto Rico.
