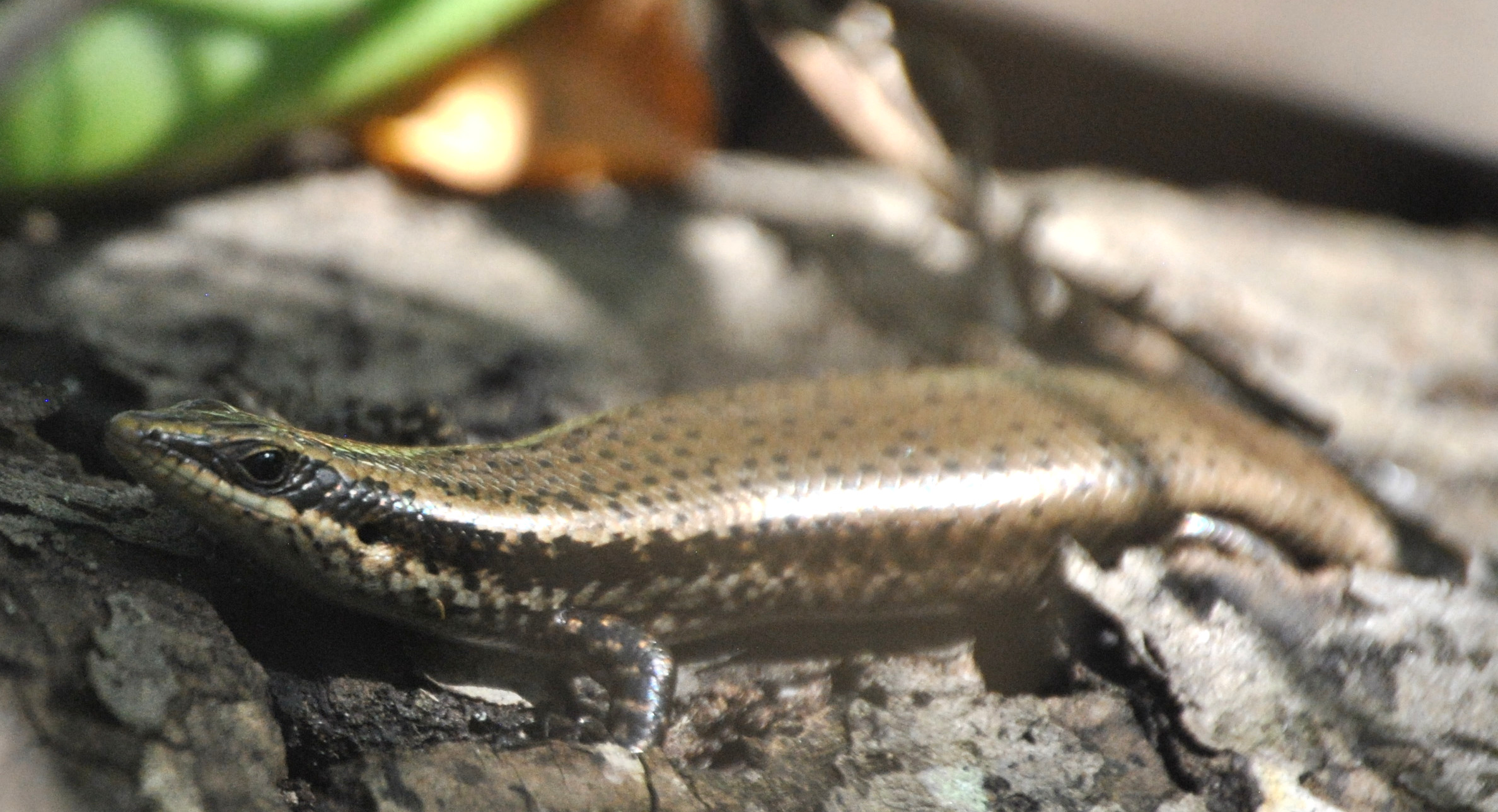
- Spondylurus nitidus

Scientific classification
- Kingdom: Animalia
- Phylum: Chordata
- Class: Reptilia
- Order: Squamata
- Family: Scincidae
- Subfamily: Mabuyinae
- Genus: Spondylurus; Fitzinger, 1826

= Spondylurus =

Genus of lizards

Spondylurus is a genus of lizards in the family Scincidae. The genus Spondylurus, vernacularly known as the Antillean four-lined skinks, is a neotropical skink taxon including many species.

== Description ==
Species in the genus Spondylurus are characterized by four (occasionally three to six) dark dorsolateral stripes. This characteristic is known to fade in older individuals, and colors in preservative shift from tans and browns to greens and blues, often causing confusion as to the true color in life.

== Conservation status ==
Many of the species of Spondylurus are extinct or endangered, resulting from invasive predators such as the mongoose.

== Geographic range ==
The genus Spondylurus is distributed throughout the West Indies including the Caicos Islands, Jamaica, Hispaniola, Puerto Rico, and the Lesser Antilles.

== Species list ==
The following 17 species are recognized as being valid, of which seven are considered "possibly extinct":

- Spondylurus anegadae Hedges & Conn, 2012 – Anegada skink (possibly extinct)
- Spondylurus caicosae Hedges & Conn, 2012 – Caicos Islands skink
- Spondylurus culebrae Hedges & Conn, 2012 – Culebra skink
- Spondylurus fulgidus (Cope, 1862) – Jamaican skink
- Spondylurus haitiae Hedges & Conn, 2012 – Hispaniolan four-lined skink (possibly extinct)
- Spondylurus lineolatus (Noble, 1933) – Hispaniolan ten-lined skink (possibly extinct)
- Spondylurus macleani (G. Mayer & Lazell, 2000 – Carrot Rock skink, slippery back
- Spondylurus magnacruzae Hedges & Conn, 2012 – greater Saint Croix skink (possibly extinct)
- Spondylurus martinae Hedges & Conn, 2012 – Saint Martin skink (possibly extinct)
- Spondylurus monae Hedges & Conn, 2012 – Mona skink
- Spondylurus monitae Hedges & Conn, 2012 – Monito skink (possibly extinct)
- Spondylurus nitidus (Garman, 1887) – Puerto Rican skink
- Spondylurus powelli Hedges & Conn, 2012 – Anguilla Bank skink
- Spondylurus semitaeniatus (Wiegmann, 1837) – Lesser Virgin Islands skink
- Spondylurus sloanii (Daudin, 1803) – Virgin Islands bronze skink
- Spondylurus spilonotus (Wiegmann, 1837) – Greater Virgin Islands skink (possibly extinct)
- Spondylurus turksae Hedges & Conn, 2012 – Turks Islands skink

Nota bene: A binomial authority in parentheses indicates that the species was originally described in a genus other than Spondylurus.
