= Spondylurus turksae =

Conservation status
- Critically Endangered (IUCN 3.1)

Scientific classification
- Kingdom: Animalia
- Phylum: Chordata
- Class: Reptilia
- Order: Squamata
- Family: Scincidae
- Genus: Spondylurus
- Species: S. turksae

Binomial name
- Spondylurus turksae Hedges & Conn, 2012

Species of lizard

The Turks Islands skink (Spondylurus turksae) is a species of skink found in the Turks and Caicos Islands.
