= Spondylurus caicosae =

Conservation status
- Near Threatened (IUCN 3.1)

Scientific classification
- Kingdom: Animalia
- Phylum: Chordata
- Class: Reptilia
- Order: Squamata
- Family: Scincidae
- Genus: Spondylurus
- Species: S. caicosae

Binomial name
- Spondylurus caicosae Hedges & Conn, 2012

Species of lizard

Spondylurus caicosae, the Caicos Islands skink, is a species of skink found in the Turks and Caicos Islands.
