= Spondylurus monitae =

Conservation status
- Critically Endangered (IUCN 3.1)

Scientific classification
- Kingdom: Animalia
- Phylum: Chordata
- Class: Reptilia
- Order: Squamata
- Family: Scincidae
- Genus: Spondylurus
- Species: S. monitae

Binomial name
- Spondylurus monitae Hedges & Conn, 2012

Species of lizard

Spondylurus monitae, the Monito skink, is a species of skink found on Monito Island in Puerto Rico.
