= Spondylurus spilonotus =

Conservation status
- Critically Endangered (IUCN 3.1)

Scientific classification
- Kingdom: Animalia
- Phylum: Chordata
- Class: Reptilia
- Order: Squamata
- Family: Scincidae
- Genus: Spondylurus
- Species: S. spilonotus

Binomial name
- Spondylurus spilonotus (Wiegmann, 1837)

Species of lizard

The Greater Virgin Islands skink (Spondylurus spilonotus) is a species of skink found in the United States Virgin Islands.
