= Spondylurus culebrae =

Conservation status
- Critically Endangered (IUCN 3.1)

Scientific classification
- Kingdom: Animalia
- Phylum: Chordata
- Class: Reptilia
- Order: Squamata
- Suborder: Scinciformata
- Infraorder: Scincomorpha
- Family: Mabuyidae
- Genus: Spondylurus
- Species: S. culebrae

Binomial name
- Spondylurus culebrae Hedges & Conn, 2012

Species of reptile

Spondylurus culebrae, the Culebra skink, is a species of skink found on Culebra and on Culebrita, an uninhabited island off Culebra, in Puerto Rico.
