= Spondylurus magnacruzae =

Conservation status
- Critically endangered, possibly extinct (IUCN 3.1)

Scientific classification
- Kingdom: Animalia
- Phylum: Chordata
- Class: Reptilia
- Order: Squamata
- Family: Scincidae
- Genus: Spondylurus
- Species: S. magnacruzae

Binomial name
- Spondylurus magnacruzae Hedges & Conn, 2012

Species of lizard

Spondylurus magnacruzae, the greater Saint Croix skink, is a species of skink found on Saint Croix in the United States Virgin Islands.

It was formerly present across most of Saint Croix where it was sighted with some regularity, but was largely extirpated from the island by the late 19th century due to the introduced small Indian mongoose (Urva auropunctata). From then onwards, the species was only known from the satellite island of Green Cay, where it is known from a specimen collected in 1964. Further surveys detected only two other sightings: once in 1987 (this individual was photographed, and this remains the only known photograph of a live S. magnacruzae) and once in September 2000. No further sightings have been recorded since then. Green Cay is a small island and also supports black rats (Rattus rattus), which may threaten any surviving populations of the species.
