= Spondylurus sloanii =

Conservation status
- Critically Endangered (IUCN 3.1)

Scientific classification
- Kingdom: Animalia
- Phylum: Chordata
- Class: Reptilia
- Order: Squamata
- Family: Scincidae
- Genus: Spondylurus
- Species: S. sloanii

Binomial name
- Spondylurus sloanii (Daudin, 1803)

Synonyms
- Scincus sloanii Daudin, 1803; Spondylurus sloanei — Fitzinger, 1826; Tiliqua sloanii — Gray, 1831; Eumeces sloanii A.M.C. Duméril & Bibron, 1839; Mabouya sloanei — Gray, 1845; Mabuya sloanii — Bocourt, 1879; Mabuia sloanii — Garman, 1887; Mabuya mabouya sloanii — Dunn, 1936; Mabuya sloanii — Mayer & Lazell, 2000; Spondylurus sloanii — Hedges & Conn, 2012

Species of lizard

Spondylurus sloanii, also known commonly as Sloane's skink or the Virgin Islands bronze skink, is a species of lizard in the family Scincidae. The species is native to the United States Virgin Islands and the British Virgin Islands.

== Etymology ==
The specific name, sloanii, is in honor of British naturalist Hans Sloane.

== Habitat ==
The preferred natural habitats of S. sloanii are the intertidal zone and shrubland.

== Reproduction ==
S. sloanii is viviparous.
