= Spondylurus semitaeniatus =

Conservation status
- Critically Endangered (IUCN 3.1)

Scientific classification
- Kingdom: Animalia
- Phylum: Chordata
- Class: Reptilia
- Order: Squamata
- Family: Scincidae
- Genus: Spondylurus
- Species: S. semitaeniatus

Binomial name
- Spondylurus semitaeniatus (Wiegmann, 1837)

Species of lizard

The Lesser Virgin Islands skink (Spondylurus semitaeniatus) is a species of skink found in the United States Virgin Islands and the British Virgin Islands.
