= Fallen Jerusalem Island =

Uninhabited island of the British Virgin Islands

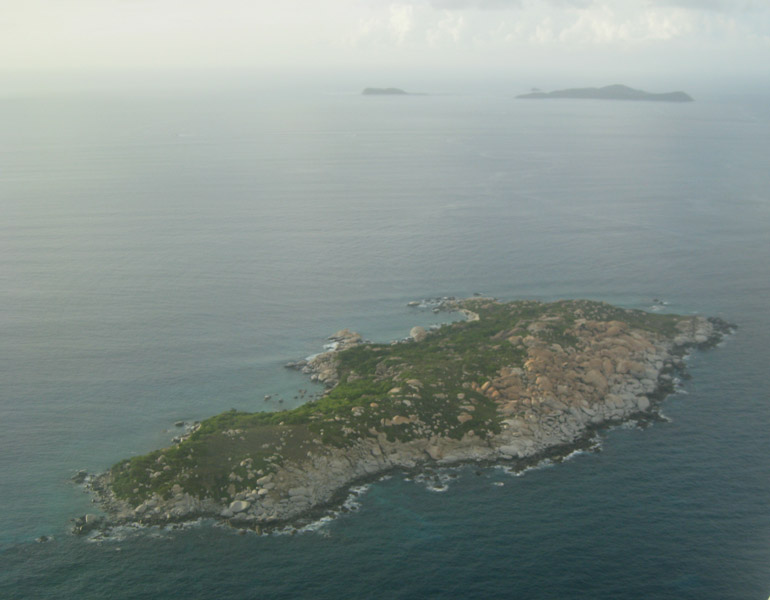
- Aerial view of Fallen Jerusalem

- The location of Fallen Jerusalem Island within the British Virgin

- Location within British Virgin Islands Location within the Caribbean

Geography
- Location: Caribbean Sea
- Coordinates: 18°25′00″N 64°27′05″W
- Archipelago: Virgin Islands
- Area: 48 acres (19 ha)

Administration
- United Kingdom
- British Overseas Territory: British Virgin Islands

Demographics
- Population: 0 (uninhabited)

Additional information
- Time zone: AST (UTC-4)
- ISO code: VG

Fallen Jerusalem is an uninhabited island of the British Virgin Islands in the Caribbean, located to the south of Virgin Gorda. It obtained its name from the large number of oversized volcanic boulders that are scattered over the island (some of which weigh thousands of tons) which give it the vague resemblance of a destroyed city. It was declared a wildlife sanctuary in 1959.

The island provides habitat for the crested anole (Anolis cristatellus wileyae).

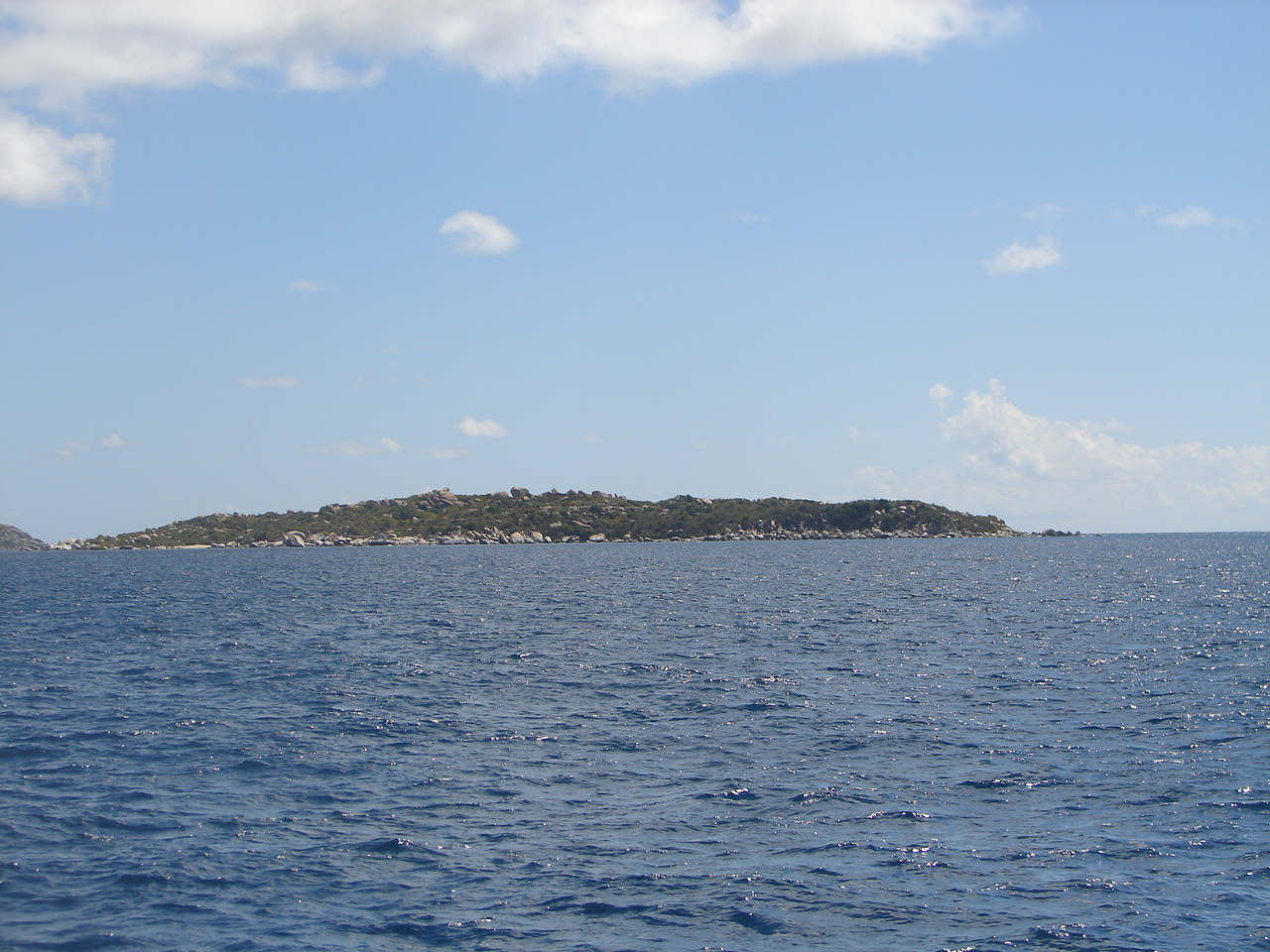
Fallen Jerusalem. Part of Virgin Gorda is visible to the left.
