= Marbled darter =

Conservation status
- Critically Endangered (IUCN 3.1)

Scientific classification
- Kingdom: Animalia
- Phylum: Chordata
- Class: Actinopterygii
- Order: Perciformes
- Family: Percidae
- Genus: Etheostoma
- Species: E. marmorpinnum

Binomial name
- Etheostoma marmorpinnum Blanton & R. E. Jenkins, 2008

Species of fish

The marbled darter (Etheostoma marmorpinnum) is a species of freshwater ray-finned fish, a darter from the subfamily Etheostomatinae, part of the family Percidae, which also contains the perches, ruffes and pikeperches. It is endemic to the eastern United States. It occurs in Tennessee in the Little River drainage and formerly occurred in the Holston River where it is now extirpated, not having been collected there since the completion of the South Fork Holston Dam. This species can reach a length of 4.1 centimetres (1.6 in) SL.
