= Leiocephalus apertosulcus =

Scientific classification
- Kingdom: Animalia
- Phylum: Chordata
- Class: Reptilia
- Order: Squamata
- Suborder: Iguania
- Family: Leiocephalidae
- Genus: Leiocephalus
- Species: †L. apertosulcus

Binomial name
- †Leiocephalus apertosulcus Etheridge, 1965

Extinct species of reptile

Leiocephalus apertosulcus, also known as the Banica giant curlytail lizard, is an extinct species of curly-tailed lizard from Hispaniola. This species stands out within the genus Leiocephalus for its unique skeletal characteristics and large size.

== Taxonomy ==
The species was described by Richard Emmett Etheridge in 1965. The holotype specimen MCZ(VP) 3404 consists of a right dentary found in Stratum 2 of the cave. Phylogenetically, L. apertosulcus along with L. cuneus and L. anonymous, are thought to form a sister group with L. greenwayi.

=== Etymology ===
Derived from Latin: "apertus" meaning "open" and "sulcus" meaning "groove", referring to its distinctive completely open Meckel's groove on the dentary.

== Morphology ==
Leiocephalus apertosulcus was remarkably large, with an estimated snout-vent length of 150–200 mm. This size surpassed all living Leiocephalus species—even L. carinatus, which reaches only 130 mm. It also dwarfed its largest Hispaniolan relative, L. melanochlorus (108 mm).

Along with L. anonymous, it was one of only two Leiocephalus species that possessed an open Meckel's groove, making it an important specimen for understanding the evolution of this genus in the Caribbean region.

== Distribution ==
The species was endemic to Hispaniola, known only from the type locality in western Dominican Republic near the Haitian border. The fossils were discovered in a cave in Cerro de San Francisco, Elías Piña Province. These remains were found in deposits dating back to the Late Pleistocene.

== Extinction ==
The extinction of L. apertosulcus aligns with the general pattern of late Pleistocene extinctions in the West Indies, possibly linked to climatic changes or human arrival. The fossil record shows that the cave where the remains were found contained numerous extinct vertebrates, indicating significant ecological shifts during the transition from the Pleistocene.
