= Leiocephalus altavelensis =

Conservation status
- Critically Endangered (IUCN 3.1)

Scientific classification
- Kingdom: Animalia
- Phylum: Chordata
- Class: Reptilia
- Order: Squamata
- Suborder: Iguania
- Family: Leiocephalidae
- Genus: Leiocephalus
- Species: L. altavelensis

Binomial name
- Leiocephalus altavelensis Noble & Hassler, 1933

Species of reptile

Leiocephalus altavelensis, also known as the Alto Velo curlytail lizard, is a species of lizard belonging to the family Leiocephalidae. It is endemic to Isla Alto Velo, an island located off the southern coast of the Dominican Republic. The species was first described by George K. Noble and William G. Hassler in 1933.

== Taxonomy ==
Leiocephalus altavelensis has been the subject of taxonomic debate. While once considered a subspecies of closely related Leiocephalus barahonensis, molecular evidence supports its status as a distinct species. Morphological distinctions also set it apart from its relatives, further justifying its specific designation.

== Distribution and habitat ==
=== Geographic range ===
This species is exclusively found on Isla Alto Velo, a small island with a total area of approximately 4 km². The island is part of the Jaragua National Park in the Pedernales Province. Its distribution is limited to the fringing rocks and coastal zones, with an elevational range from sea level to 100 meters above sea level. The species is absent from the island's central plateau.

The Alto Velo curlytail lizard inhabits xeric coastal environments, where it utilizes rocks, leaf litter, and grass for shelter and foraging. The species is oviparous. Its habitat overlaps with seabird nesting grounds, adding complexity to its ecological interactions.
