= Leiocephalus anonymous =

Scientific classification
- Kingdom: Animalia
- Phylum: Chordata
- Class: Reptilia
- Order: Squamata
- Suborder: Iguania
- Family: Leiocephalidae
- Genus: Leiocephalus
- Species: †L. anonymous

Binomial name
- †Leiocephalus anonymous Pregill, 1984

Extinct species of reptile

Leiocephalus anonymous, also known as the Atalaye giant curlytail lizard, is an extinct species of curly-tailed lizard discovered in cave deposits of northwestern Haiti. The species is notable for its large size among curly-tailed lizards and its unique combination of ancestral and derived skeletal features. Its fossils remained unstudied for over 50 years before their formal description in 1984.

== Taxonomy ==
Gregory Pregill published the description of this species in 1984, based on fossil specimens he found in Smithsonian Institution storage. The specimens, collected from cave deposits in northern Haiti during the 1920s, had languished unstudied for over half a century.

From a phylogenetic perspective, research suggests that Leiocephalus anonymous exhibits a close evolutionary relationship with L. apertosulcus and L. cuneus, collectively forming a monophyletic assemblage that shares a common ancestor with L. greenwayi.

=== Etymology ===
The specific epithet anonymous (from Greek, meaning "nameless") was chosen because the species remained unidentified for decades after its initial discovery.

== Morphology ==
The fossils indicate an estimated snout-to-vent length (SVL) of 120–130 mm (4.7–5.1 in) for mature individuals, making Leiocephalus anonymous one of the larger members of its genus. Morphological comparisons suggest that L. anonymous may represent a reversal to a primitive character state due to the presence of a well-developed intramandibular septum.

The species displayed distinctive skeletal features, particularly in its dentary bone structure. Its Meckelian groove exhibited an intermediate closure pattern, falling between the open configuration of L. apertosulcus and the fully fused state of other Leiocephalus species. The teeth showed a mix of simple and elaborate fleur-de-lis patterned tricuspid forms. Other key features included a pineal foramen wholly contained within the frontal bone and an exceptionally wide interorbital region.

== Distribution ==
Fossil evidence comes exclusively from cave deposits near St. Michel de l'Atalaye in Haiti's Artibonite department. These rich deposits yielded diverse vertebrate remains, including mammals, birds, and other reptiles. Scientists believe the species' range likely encompassed much of northern Hispaniola.

== Extinction ==
The extinction of Leiocephalus anonymous is attributed to environmental disturbances, possibly exacerbated by climatic changes at the end of the Pleistocene and anthropogenic factors during early human colonization of the Antilles. The presence of rat (Rattus) bones in the fossil deposits raises the possibility that L. anonymous persisted into post-Columbian times, although this remains uncertain due to potential contamination of sediment layers.

The disappearance of L. anonymous reflects a broader extinction pattern in the West Indies, demonstrating how island species often prove especially vulnerable to environmental and human-driven changes.
