= Leiocephalus roquetus =

Scientific classification
- Kingdom: Animalia
- Phylum: Chordata
- Class: Reptilia
- Order: Squamata
- Suborder: Iguania
- Family: Leiocephalidae
- Genus: Leiocephalus
- Species: †L. roquetus

Binomial name
- †Leiocephalus roquetus Bochaton, Charles, and Lenoble, 2021

Extinct species of lizard

Leiocephalus roquetus, also known as the curlytail roquet or La Désirade curlytail lizard, is an extinct species of lizard in the family of curly-tailed lizard (Leiocephalidae). It was endemic to Guadeloupe.

The specific epithet, roquetus, refers to the name it was given by early French settlers on Guadeloupe; the indigenous Kalinago name for the species was never recorded. Aside from fossil remains, it is only known from a single specimen collected by one Théodore Roger, who deposited it circa 1835 at the Natural History Museum in Bordeaux; this specimen was misidentified in the mid-20th century as a Martinique curlytail (L. herminieri). The specimen was reexamined in 2015, and with the help of extensive Leiocephalus fossil remains discovered on La Désirade in 2018, was found to be a distinct species, and described as L. roquetus in 2021.

This species, along with L. herminieri, displays a primitive morphology compared to all other known species of Leiocephalus; it has thus been proposed that roquetus and herminieri belong to a basal clade of Leiocephalus restricted to the Lesser Antilles which has been completely wiped out by humans; all modern Leiocephalus are found only in the Greater Antilles and associated islands. L. roquetus was likely driven to extinction by introduced species, habitat degradation, and intensive agriculture.
