= Navassa curly-tailed lizard =

Conservation status
- Extinct (19th century) (IUCN 3.1)

Scientific classification
- Kingdom: Animalia
- Phylum: Chordata
- Class: Reptilia
- Order: Squamata
- Suborder: Iguania
- Family: Leiocephalidae
- Genus: Leiocephalus
- Species: †L. eremitus

Binomial name
- †Leiocephalus eremitus (Cope, 1868)

Synonyms
- Liocephalus [sic] eremitus Cope, 1868; Leiocephalus eremitus — Boulenger, 1885; Thomas, 1966

Extinct species of lizard

The Navassa curly-tailed lizard or Navassa curlytail lizard (Leiocephalus eremitus) is an extinct lizard species from the family of curly-tailed lizard (Leiocephalidae). It is known only from the holotype, a female specimen from which it was described in 1868. A possible second specimen which was collected by Rollo Beck in 1917 was instead identified as a Tiburon curly-tailed lizard (Leiocephalus melanochlorus) by herpetologist Richard Thomas in 1966.

== Geographic range ==
Leiocephalus eremitus was endemic to Navassa Island.

== Description ==
The size of the holotype is given as 64 mm (2 1/2 in) snout–vent length (SVL). The head and ventral scales are smooth. The dorsal scales are larger than the scales on the flanks and the ventral scales. The dorsum is dark gray with nine dark transverse bars. The tail is pale with transverse bars on the basal half and uniformly dark gray to black on the posterior half. Throat, breast, belly and the extremities are brown with pale-tipped scales.

== Behavior and habitat ==
Navassa has xeric forest vegetation, but nothing specific is known about biology of this species. The reason for its extinction is also unknown, but predation by cats is a possible reason.
