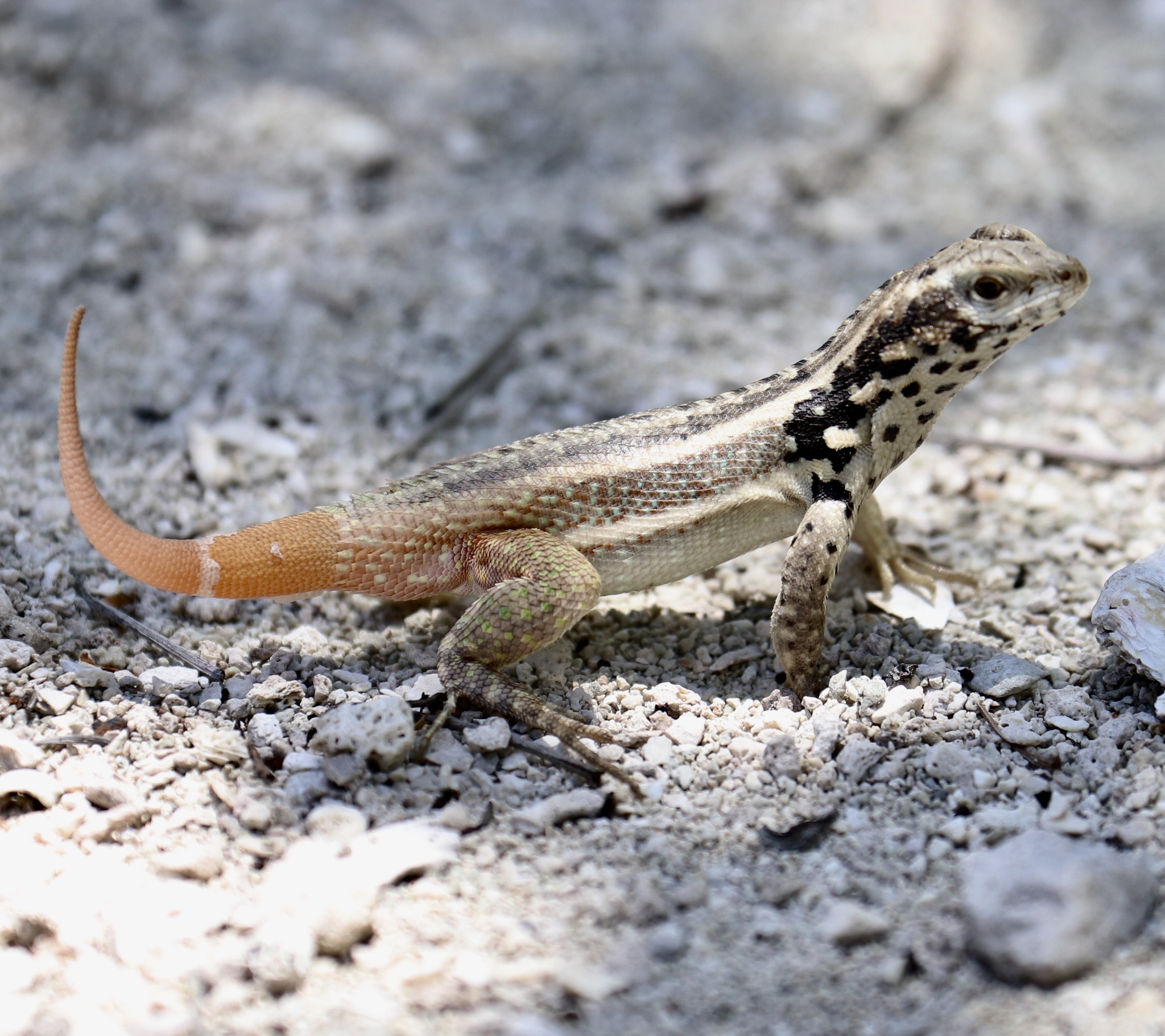
- Leiocephalus lunatus melaenascelis

Conservation status
- Least Concern (IUCN 3.1)

Scientific classification
- Kingdom: Animalia
- Phylum: Chordata
- Class: Reptilia
- Order: Squamata
- Suborder: Iguania
- Family: Leiocephalidae
- Genus: Leiocephalus
- Species: L. lunatus

Binomial name
- Leiocephalus lunatus Cochran, 1934

= Leiocephalus lunatus =

Species of lizard

Leiocephalus lunatus, commonly known as the Hispaniolan maskless curlytail or Santo Domingo curlytail lizard, is a species of lizard in the family Leiocephalidae (curly-tailed lizards). It is native to the Dominican Republic.

== Taxonomy and etymology ==
The first description of Leiocephalus lunatus was published by Doris Mable Cochran in 1934, under the name Leiocephalus personatus lunatus. The name lunatus is derived from Latin, meaning 'crescent' or 'half-moon', which according to herpetologists Robert Powell and Matthew Gifford is a reference to the lizard's "crescent-shaped shoulder patches". The holotype of the species is a male specimen collected by George Kruck Cherrie in 1895, with the type locality being Santo Domingo, the capital of the Dominican Republic. In 1967, Albert Schwartz recognized lunatus as its own species rather than as a subspecies of Leiocephalus personatus.

=== Subspecies ===
L. lunatus has six recognized subspecies, with L. l. lunatus being the subspecies of Cochran's original description of L. personatus lunatus, recognized by Schwartz as a subspecies of L. lunatus when he recognized the latter as its own species in 1967. The other subspecies are louisae, arenicolor, melaenascelis, thomasi and lewisi. Of these, louisae and arenicolor were also originally considered subspecies of personatus before being moved to lunatus by Schwartz in 1967.

The first description of L. l. louisae was published by Cochran in 1934, alongside the one of L. l. lunatus. The name louisae is derived from that of Louisa Bowditch Barbour, daughter of Thomas Barbour and a member of the Utowana Expedition, which collected the holotype of the subspecies, a male, in April 1934, with the type locality being Saona Island.

The first description of L. l. arenicolor was published by Robert Mertens in 1939. The name arenicolor is derived from Latin, meaning 'sand-colour', which according to Powell and Gifford is "presumably in reference to the sandy dorsal color in the subspecies". Its holotype is a male collected by Mertens in March of that year, with the type locality being a sandy beach in San Pedro de Macorís.

The first description of L. l. melaenascelis was published by Schwartz in 1967, in the same paper that recognized L. lunatus as its own species. The name melaenascelis is derived from Greek, meaning 'black spot, which, according to Powell and Gifford, is presumably a reference to a prominent black spot on the shoulders and neck that is typical for the subspecies. Its holotype is a male collected by Schwartz, Ronald F. Klinikowski, David C. Leber and Richard Thomas in August 1963, with the type locality being the western end of Catalina Island.

The first description of L. l. thomasi was published by Schwartz in 1967, in the same paper that recognized L. lunatus as its own species. According to Powell and Gifford, the name thomasi is presumably derived from that of Richard Thomas, friend and field companion of Schwartz.

The first description of L. l. lewisi was published by Schwartz in 1969. The name lewisi is derived from that of J.K. Lewis, who collected six of the twelve paratypes of the subspecies. Its holotype is a male collected by Klinkowski, Leber and Thomas in August 1963, with the type locality being about 0.9 km (0.56 mi) east of Boca Chica.
