= Leiocephalus vinculum =

Conservation status
- Endangered (IUCN 3.1)

Scientific classification
- Kingdom: Animalia
- Phylum: Chordata
- Class: Reptilia
- Order: Squamata
- Suborder: Iguania
- Family: Leiocephalidae
- Genus: Leiocephalus
- Species: L. vinculum

Binomial name
- Leiocephalus vinculum Cochran, 1928

Species of lizard

Leiocephalus vinculum, commonly known as the Gonave curlytail or Cochran's curlytail lizard , is a species of lizard in the family Leiocephalidae (curly-tailed lizard). It is native to Haiti.
