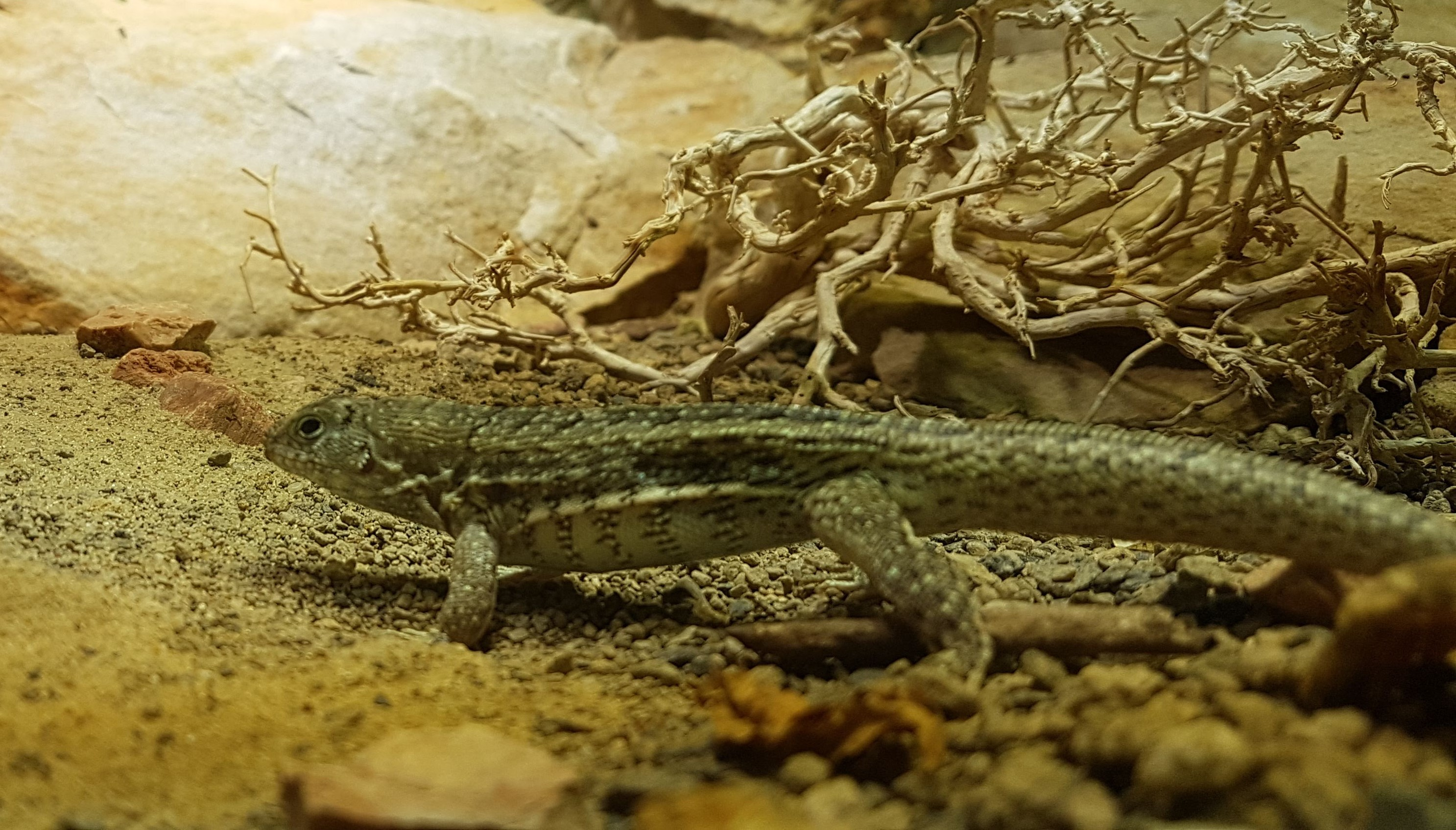
- In captivity

Conservation status
- Least Concern (IUCN 3.1)

Scientific classification
- Kingdom: Animalia
- Phylum: Chordata
- Class: Reptilia
- Order: Squamata
- Suborder: Iguania
- Family: Leiocephalidae
- Genus: Leiocephalus
- Species: L. schreibersii

Binomial name
- Leiocephalus schreibersii (Gravenhorst, 1837)

Synonyms
- Pristinotus schreibersii Gravenhorst, 1837; Steironotus schreibersii; Liocephalus [sic] schreibersii; Leiocephalus schreibersi [sic]

= Hispaniolan curlytail lizard =

Species of lizard

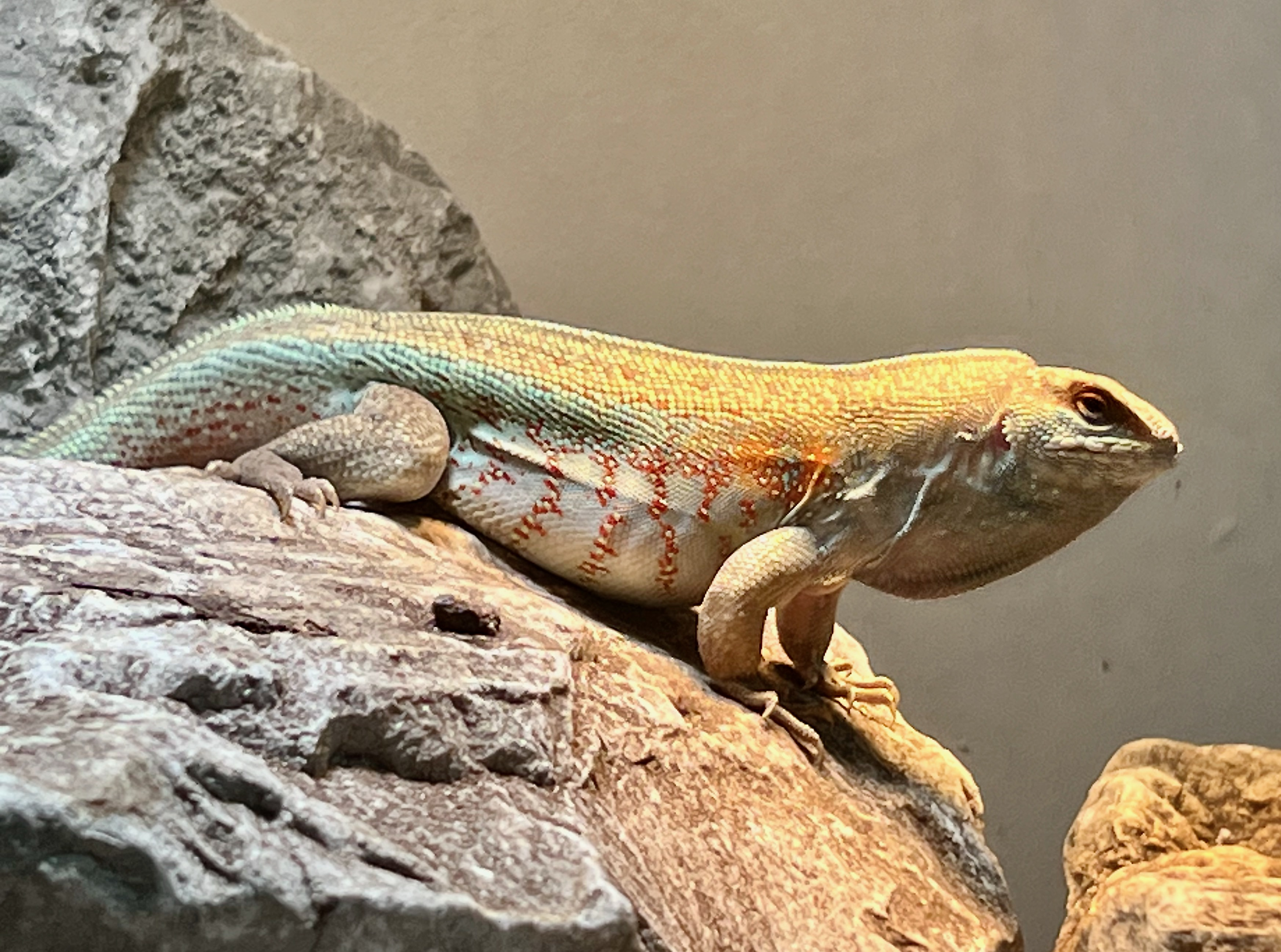

The Hispaniolan curlytail lizard (Leiocephalus schreibersii), also known as the Hispaniolan khaki curlytail, the red-sided curlytail lizard, the red-sided curly-tailed lizard, or Schreibers's curly-tailed lizard, is a common lizard species in the family Leiocephalidae. It is native to Hispaniola (in both Haiti and the Dominican Republic) in the Caribbean, and an introduced population is found in southern Florida. There are two recognized subspecies.

== Taxonomy ==
=== Etymology ===
The specific name, schreibersi, is in honor of Austrian naturalist Carl Franz Anton Ritter von Schreibers.

=== Subspecies ===
Including the nominotypical subspecies, two subspecies are recognized as being valid.

- Leiocephalus schreibersii nesomorus Schwartz, 1968
- Leiocephalus schreibersii schreibersii (Gravenhorst, 1838)

Nota bene: A trinomial authority in parentheses indicates that the subspecies was originally described in a genus other than Leiocephalus.

== Distribution and habitat ==
L. schreibersii is indigenous to the main island of Hispaniola (the Dominican Republic and Haiti), and Île de la Tortue. It is also found in Florida as an introduced species. The preferred natural habitat of L. schreibersii is shrubland at altitudes from sea level to 500 m (1,600 ft).

== Life cycle and behavior ==
L. schreibersii is oviparous.

L. schreibersii is active during the day. It feeds mainly on insects.
