= Leiocephalus loxogrammus =

Conservation status
- Least Concern (IUCN 3.1)

Scientific classification
- Kingdom: Animalia
- Phylum: Chordata
- Class: Reptilia
- Order: Squamata
- Suborder: Iguania
- Family: Leiocephalidae
- Genus: Leiocephalus
- Species: L. loxogrammus

Binomial name
- Leiocephalus loxogrammus (Cope, 1887)

Synonyms
- Liocephalus [sic] loxogrammus Cope, 1887; Leiocephalus loxogrammus — Barbour & Shreve, 1935

Species of lizard

Leiocephalus loxogrammus, commonly known as the Rum Cay curlytail lizard and the San Salvador curlytail, is a lizard species in the family of curly-tailed lizard (Leiocephalidae). The species is endemic to The Bahamas and is only known to be found on San Salvador Island and Rum Cay.

== Subspecies ==
Two subspecies have been described for the two different island populations: L. l. loxogrammus on Rum Cay and L. l. parnelli on San Salvador Island.
