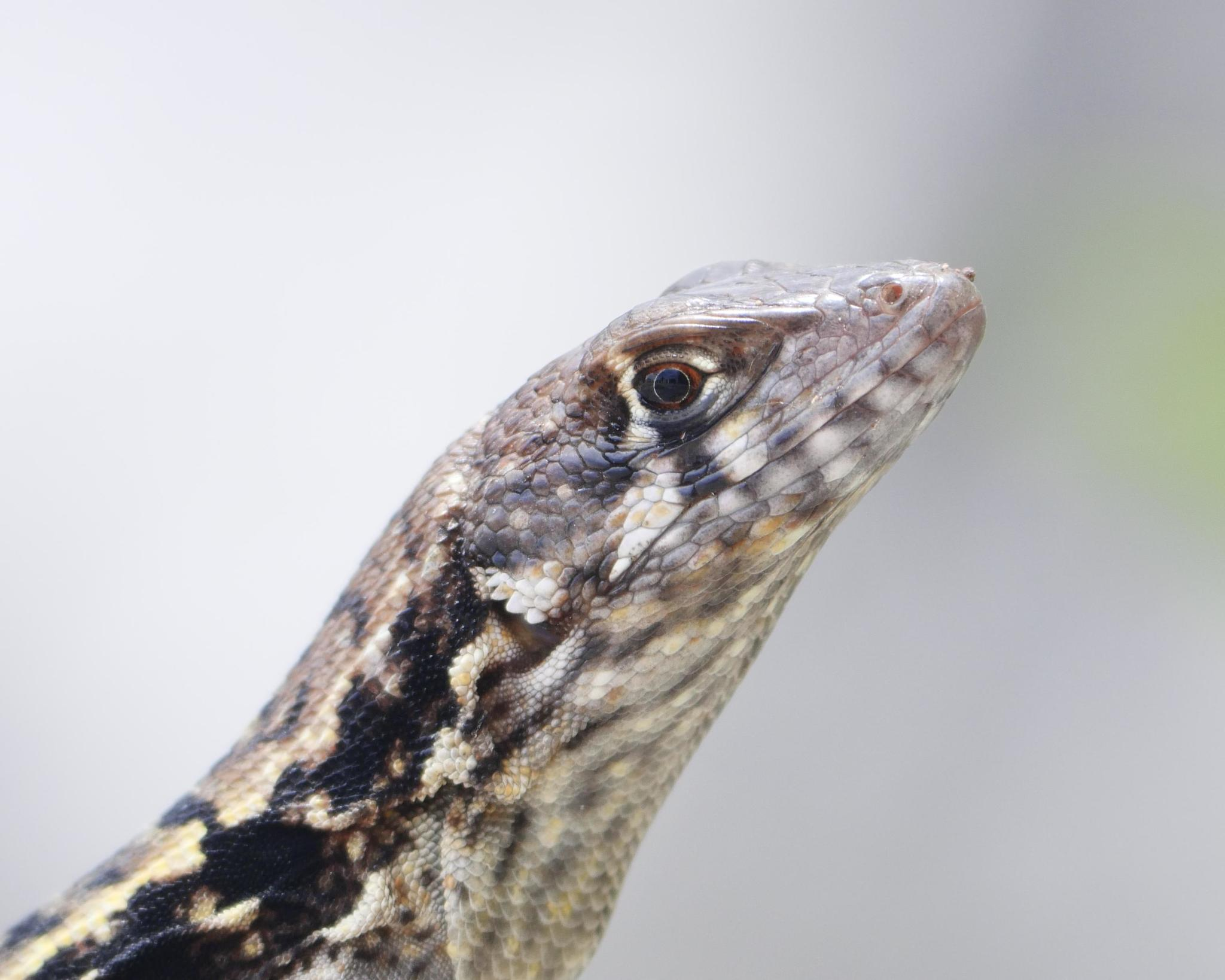

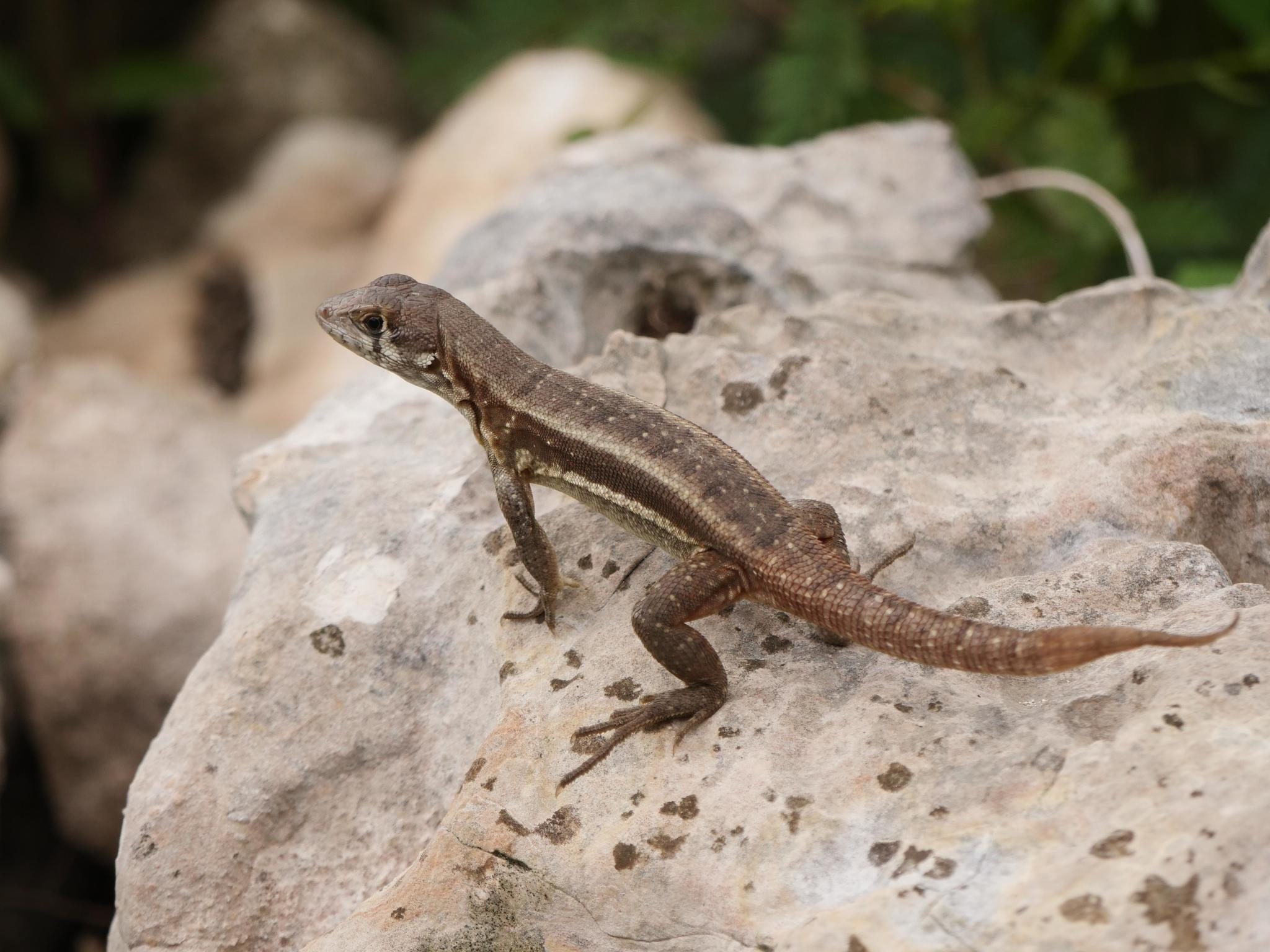

Conservation status
- Vulnerable (IUCN 3.1)

Scientific classification
- Kingdom: Animalia
- Phylum: Chordata
- Class: Reptilia
- Order: Squamata
- Suborder: Iguania
- Family: Leiocephalidae
- Genus: Leiocephalus
- Species: L. psammodromus

Binomial name
- Leiocephalus psammodromus Barbour, 1920

= Leiocephalus psammodromus =

Species of lizard

Leiocephalus psammodromus, commonly known as the Turks & Caicos curlytail and the Bastion Cay curlytail lizard, is a species of lizard in the family Leiocephalidae (curly-tailed lizards). The species is native to the Turks and Caicos Islands in the Caribbean Sea.

== Taxonomy ==
Leiocephalus psammodromus was first formally described as Leiocephalus arenarius in 1916 by the American herpetologist Thomas Barbour with its type locality given as Bastion Cay in the Turks Islands. However, as the specific name arenarius was thought to be preoccupied by Steironotus arenarius, a species now classified in a different family, so in 1920 Barbour proposed the new name psammodromus. This species is classified in the genus Leiocephalus which is the only genus in the monotypic family Leiocephalidae, the curly-tailed lizards.

== Description ==
Leiocephalus psammodromus is a smaller species of curly-tailed lizard with less well-developed keels on its dorsal scales. The overall color is pale, sandy gray marked with irregular black bars and spots, the underside is grayish white with a scattering of dark spots on the throat.

== Distribution and habitat ==
Leiocephalus psammodromus is endemic to the Turks and Caicos Islands, and has been recorded on all of the islands, although it may have been extirpated from some (see below). The Turks and Caicos curly-tailed lizard is found in xeric areas, in coastal scrub and open areas, often in leaf litter. Its an omnivore which feeds on fruit and other lizards, even scavenging the carcasses of conspecifics.

== Conservation status ==
Leiocephalus psammodromus was assessed as vulnerable by the IUCN in 2015 due to a sharply declining population threatened by habitat loss and invasive species. 2008 surveys on South Caicos, Salt Cay, Cotton Cay, or Grand Turk, did not report any individual of this species, as a result it is considered potentially extinct on these islands.
