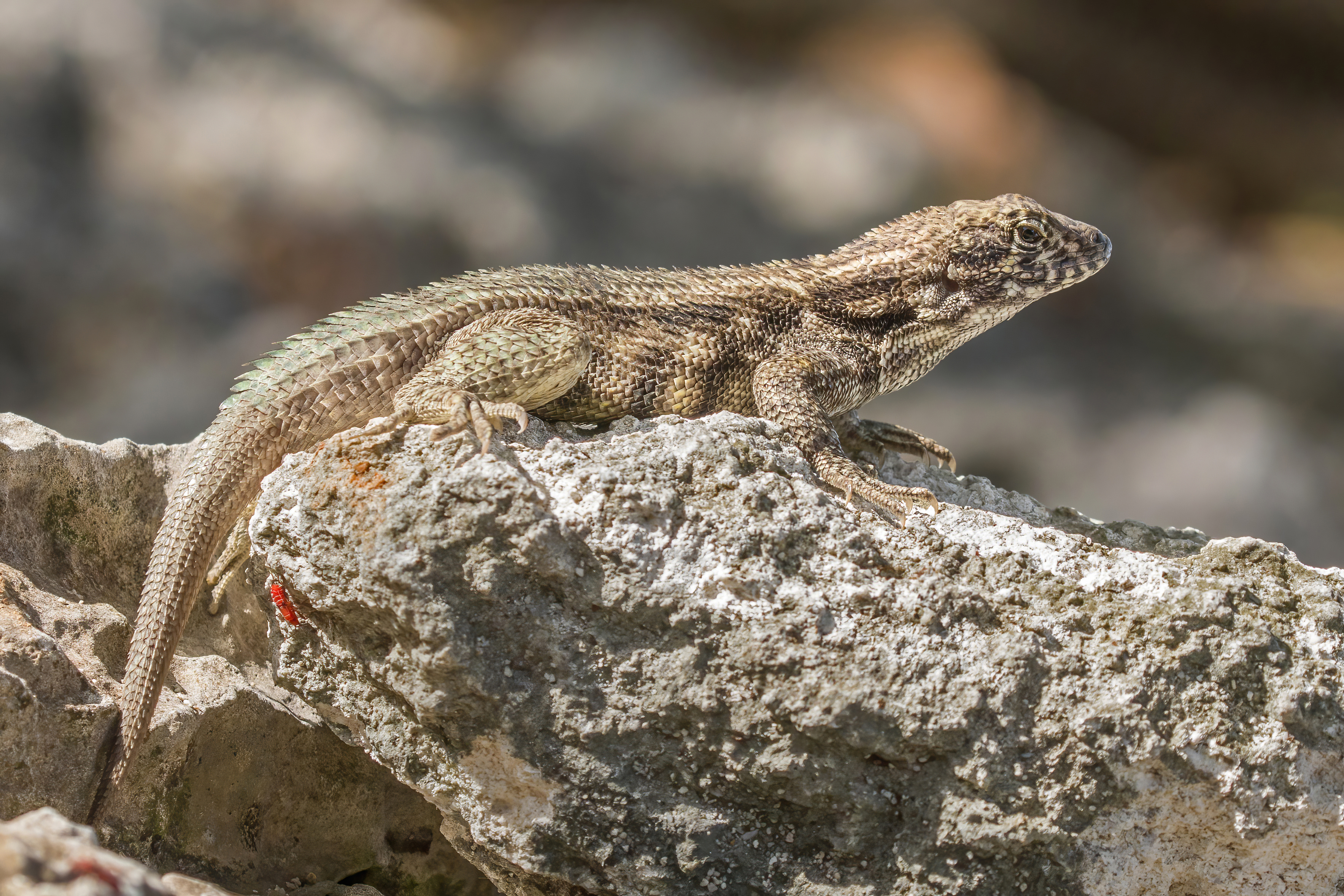
- On Grand Cayman

Scientific classification
- Kingdom: Animalia
- Phylum: Chordata
- Class: Reptilia
- Order: Squamata
- Suborder: Iguania
- Family: Leiocephalidae
- Genus: Leiocephalus
- Species: L. varius

Binomial name
- Leiocephalus varius Garman, 1887

= Leiocephalus varius =

Species of lizard

Leiocephalus varius, commonly known as the Cayman curlytail or Cayman curly-tailed lizard, is a species of lizard in the family Leiocephalidae (curly-tailed lizard). It is native to the Cayman Islands.
