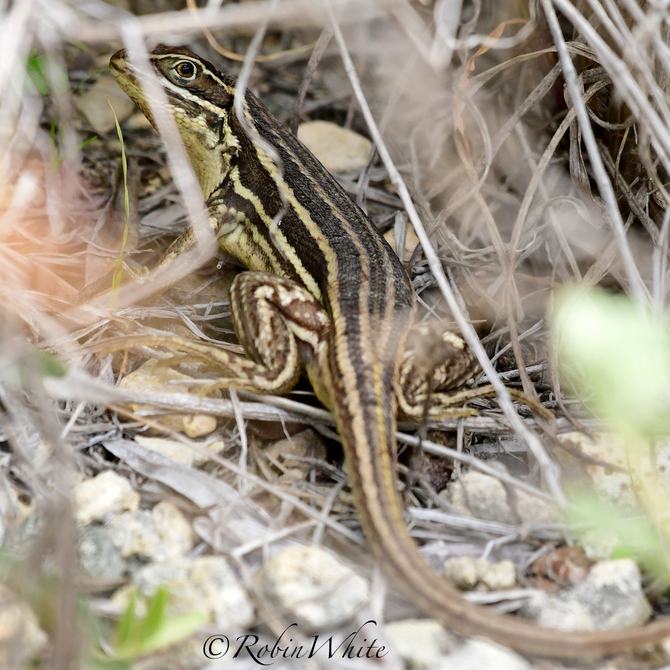

Conservation status
- Critically Endangered (IUCN 3.1)

Scientific classification
- Kingdom: Animalia
- Phylum: Chordata
- Class: Reptilia
- Order: Squamata
- Suborder: Iguania
- Family: Leiocephalidae
- Genus: Leiocephalus
- Species: L. onaneyi

Binomial name
- Leiocephalus onaneyi Garrido, 1973

= Leiocephalus onaneyi =

Species of lizard

Leiocephalus onaneyi, known commonly as the Sierra curlytail lizard, Guantanamo striped curlytail or Guantánamo striped curly-tailed lizard, is a critically endangered species of lizard in the family Leiocephalidae (curly-tailed lizards). It is endemic to the Guantánamo Province of Cuba.

== Taxonomy ==
The first description of Leiocephalus onaneyi was published in 1973 by Orlando H. Garrido. The specific name was chosen in honor of Onaney Muñiz, who collected the type series of the species in 1970. The type locality is the top of Loma (Note: meaning 'knoll') de Macambo, between San Antonio del Sur and Imías, in Guantánamo Province, Cuba, at an elevation of about 150 m (490 ft).

== Description ==
L. onaneyi can reach snout–vent lengths of up to 77 mm (3.0 in), medium size for a Leiocephalus. The back has a chocolate-brown line going down the middle of it, surrounded by slightly darker chocolate brown line on each side, and after these there are another seven lines going on each side of the back, alternating between chocolate brown and a light brownish grey in colour. Only the throat colouration differs between males and females, being white for males and grey for females, and this colouration extends down towards the belly, which is white. The colourations of the throat and belly are solid, with no discernible markings.

== Distribution and habitat ==
L. onaneyi is only known to live in the vicinity of its type locality, at elevations of 150–200 m (490–660 ft). The area is located near the coast and has a xeric habitat, with limestone karst topography and vegetation primarily consisting of grasses, agaves and bushes. The quality and extent of its habitat is threatened by goat grazing and by fires being intentionally lit to clear land so that it may be turned into pasture. Due to these threats, and the fact that the area is estimated to have an extent of less than 100 km^{2} (39 sq mi), led to it being listed as critically endangered on the IUCN Red List after its 2016 assessment.
