= Leiocephalus inaguae =

Conservation status
- Least Concern (IUCN 3.1)

Scientific classification
- Kingdom: Animalia
- Phylum: Chordata
- Class: Reptilia
- Order: Squamata
- Suborder: Iguania
- Family: Leiocephalidae
- Genus: Leiocephalus
- Species: L. inaguae

Binomial name
- Leiocephalus inaguae Cochran, 1931

Species of lizard

Leiocephalus inaguae, commonly known as the Inagua curlytail lizard, is a species of lizard in the family Leiocephalidae.

== Description ==
Males of L. inaguae can reach 90 mm (3.5 inches) snout-to-vent length (SVL), females are smaller at about 74 mm (3 inches) SVL. There is a strong colouration difference between the males and females (dichromatism).

== Habitat ==
L. inaguae prefers dry, exposed areas and is common on the coast, where it can be found amongst building materials, rocks, and drift wood.

== Diet ==
The species L. inaguae is a typical omnivore, feeding on insects (Lepidoptera larvae, Coleoptera, Formicidae), spiders, fruits, flowers, and buds.

== Geographic range ==
The Inagua curly-tailed lizard is endemic to the Bahamas and has an extremely restricted range as it is only found on Great Inagua.

== Conservation status ==
L. inaguae is not listed by the IUCN or CITES as needing any special conservation, however, research is needed to determine its vulnerability due to its restricted range.
