= Leiocephalus jamaicensis =

Conservation status
- Extinct

Scientific classification
- Kingdom: Animalia
- Phylum: Chordata
- Class: Reptilia
- Order: Squamata
- Suborder: Iguania
- Family: Leiocephalidae
- Genus: Leiocephalus
- Species: †L. jamaicensis

Binomial name
- †Leiocephalus jamaicensis Etheridge, 1966

Species of lizard

Leiocephalus jamaicensis, commonly known as the Jamaican curlytail, is an extinct species of lizard in the family Leiocephalidae (curly-tailed lizard). It was native to Jamaica.

== Morphology ==
L. jamaicensis was a large lizard species that could grow up to 130 mm in snout-vent length.

Fossil evidence suggests there may have been two distinct variants of this species, as shown by different frontal bone structures: one specimen found in Portland Cave had a wide posterior with well-developed rugosities, while another from Montego Bay Airport Cave was narrow and smooth.

== Distribution ==
Known only from fossilized remains found in Jamaica. The fossils have been discovered at several locations across the island, including:

- Dairy Cave in St. Ann Parish
- Montego Bay Airport Cave in St. James Parish
- Portland Ridge Caves in Clarendon Parish
- Marta Tick Cave near Quickstep in Trelawny Parish

=== Biogeographical significance ===
This species was part of a broader distribution of Leiocephalus lizards throughout the West Indies, with fossil evidence showing that the genus once ranged across all main islands of the Greater Antilles and likely most of the Lesser Antilles as far south as Martinique.

== Extinction ==
The species was widespread throughout central and western Jamaica and may have persisted into historical times. The most recent fossils from Marta Tick Cave were dated to approximately 770 ± 70 years before present. This timing, along with other Leiocephalus species that became extinct around European settlement, provides insights into relatively recent ecological changes in the Caribbean.
