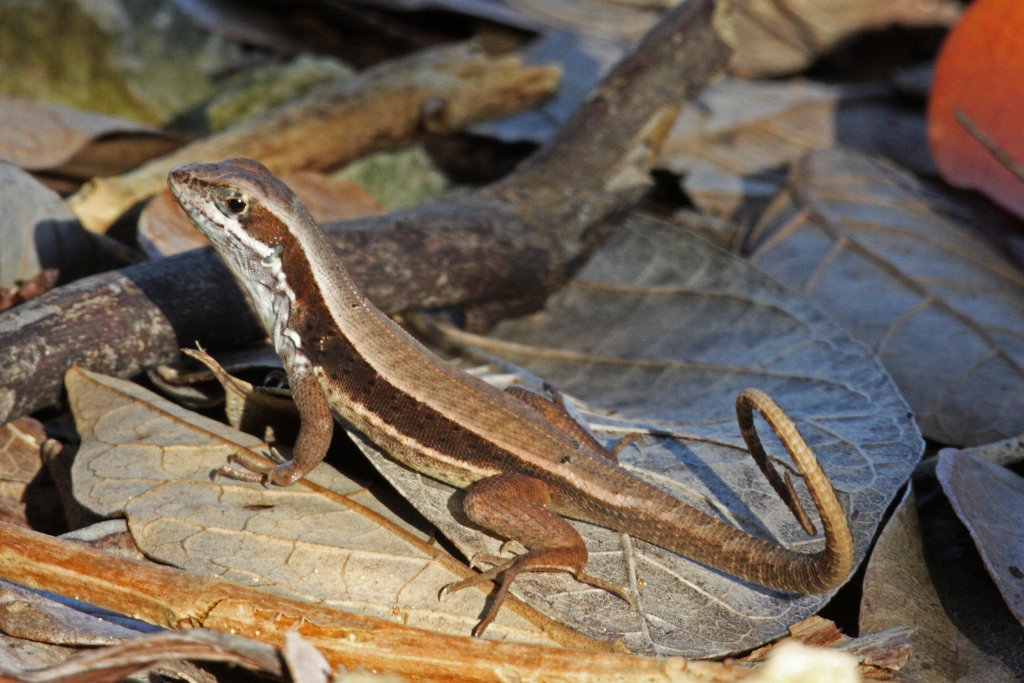

Conservation status
- Least Concern (IUCN 3.1)

Scientific classification
- Kingdom: Animalia
- Phylum: Chordata
- Class: Reptilia
- Order: Squamata
- Suborder: Iguania
- Family: Leiocephalidae
- Genus: Leiocephalus
- Species: L. macropus

Binomial name
- Leiocephalus macropus (Cope, 1863)

= Leiocephalus macropus =

Species of lizard

Leiocephalus macropus, commonly known as the Cuban side-blotched curlytail or Monte Verde curlytail lizard, is a species of lizard in the family Leiocephalidae (curly-tailed lizard). It is native to Cuba.
