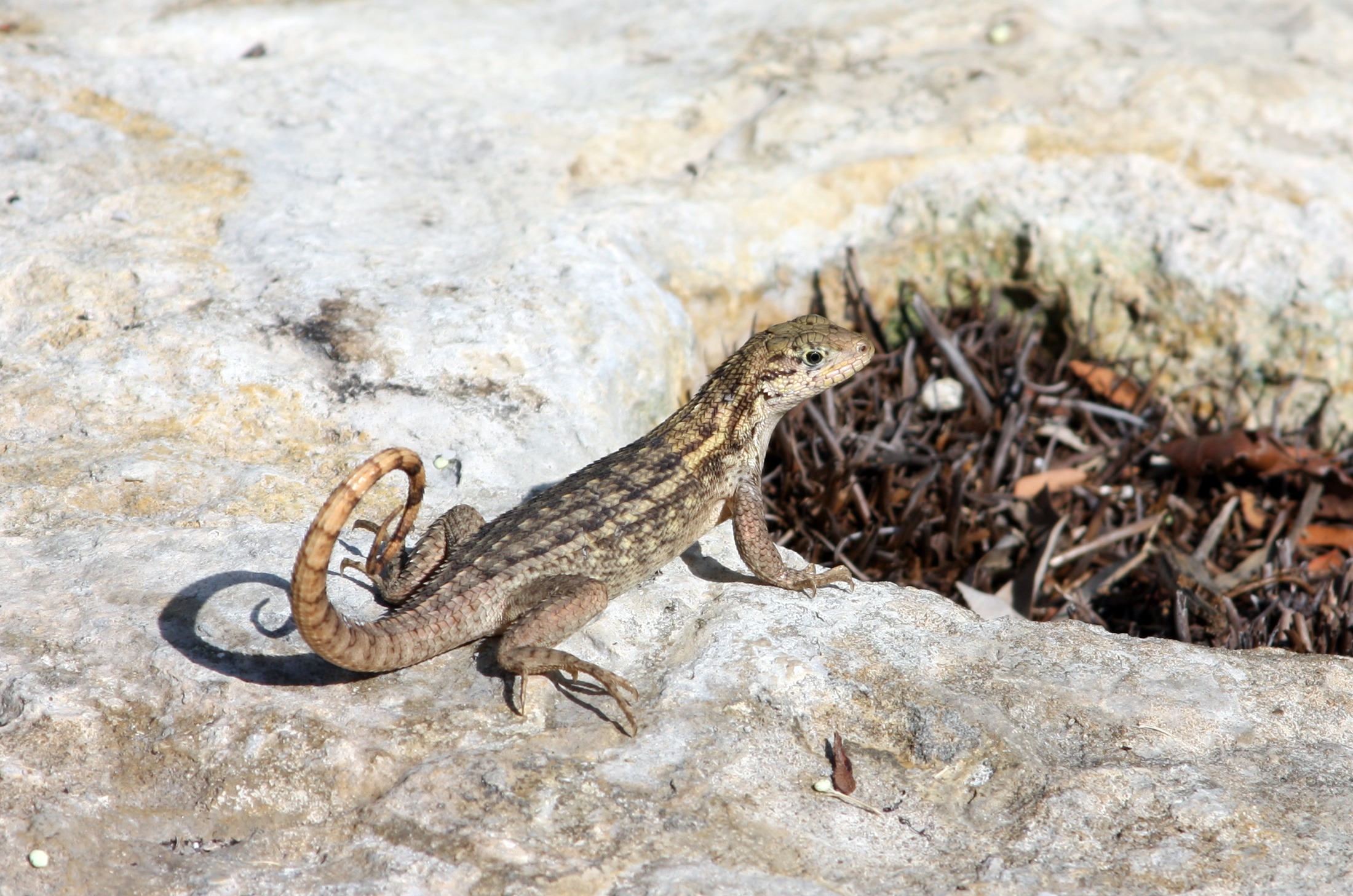
- L. c. armouri curling its tail in Florida

Scientific classification
- Kingdom: Animalia
- Phylum: Chordata
- Class: Reptilia
- Order: Squamata
- Suborder: Iguania
- Family: Leiocephalidae
- Genus: Leiocephalus
- Species: L. carinatus
- Subspecies: L. c. armouri

Trinomial name
- Leiocephalus carinatus armouri Barbour & Shreve, 1935

= Leiocephalus carinatus armouri =

Subspecies of lizard

Leiocephalus carinatus armouri, commonly known as the Little Bahama curly-tailed lizard, is a subspecies of Leiocephalus carinatus, the northern curly-tailed lizard. It was previously endemic to the Bahama Islands.

== Etymology ==
The specific name, armouri, is in honor of Mr. Allison Vincent Armour, an American philanthropist, owner of the yacht, Utowana, used for scientific expeditions.

== Geographic range ==
It was originally found only on Grand Bahama Island and the Abacos, but was released intentionally in Palm Beach, Florida in the 1940s. It has since spread, and now lives widely in southern Florida in addition to places in the Bahamas.
