= Leiocephalus punctatus =

Conservation status
- Least Concern (IUCN 3.1)

Scientific classification
- Kingdom: Animalia
- Phylum: Chordata
- Class: Reptilia
- Order: Squamata
- Suborder: Iguania
- Family: Leiocephalidae
- Genus: Leiocephalus
- Species: L. punctatus

Binomial name
- Leiocephalus punctatus Cochran, 1931

Species of lizard

Leiocephalus punctatus, commonly known as the Crooked-Acklins curlytail or spotted curlytail lizard, is a species of lizard in the family Leiocephalidae (curly-tailed lizard). It is native to the Bahamas.
