= Leiocephalus stictigaster =

Conservation status
- Least Concern (IUCN 3.1)

Scientific classification
- Kingdom: Animalia
- Phylum: Chordata
- Class: Reptilia
- Order: Squamata
- Suborder: Iguania
- Family: Leiocephalidae
- Genus: Leiocephalus
- Species: L. stictigaster

Binomial name
- Leiocephalus stictigaster Schwartz, 1959

Species of lizard

Leiocephalus stictigaster, commonly known as the Cuban striped curlytail or Cabo Corrientes curlytail lizard, is a species of lizard in the family Leiocephalidae (curly-tailed lizard). It is native to Cuba.
