= Leiocephalus endomychus =

Conservation status
- Critically Endangered (IUCN 3.1)

Scientific classification
- Kingdom: Animalia
- Phylum: Chordata
- Class: Reptilia
- Order: Squamata
- Suborder: Iguania
- Family: Leiocephalidae
- Genus: Leiocephalus
- Species: L. endomychus

Binomial name
- Leiocephalus endomychus Schwartz, 1967

Species of lizard

Leiocephalus endomychus, commonly known as the Hinche curlytail or central Haitian curlytail, is a species of lizard in the family Leiocephalidae (curly-tailed lizard). It is native to Haiti, although fossils are known from Barbuda and Antigua.
