= Leiocephalus etheridgei =

Conservation status
- Extinct

Scientific classification
- Kingdom: Animalia
- Phylum: Chordata
- Class: Reptilia
- Order: Squamata
- Suborder: Iguania
- Family: Leiocephalidae
- Genus: Leiocephalus
- Species: †L. etheridgei

Binomial name
- †Leiocephalus etheridgei Pregill, 1981

Species of lizard

Leiocephalus etheridgei, commonly known as the Morovis curlytail, is an extinct species of lizard in the family Leiocephalidae (curly-tailed lizards). The species was native to Puerto Rico.

== Etymology ==
The specific name, etheridgei, is in honor of American herpetologist Richard Emmett Etheridge.

== Geographic range ==
L. etherigei is only known from fossil remains found in a cave in the municipality of Morovis, Puerto Rico.
