= Leiocephalus partitus =

Conservation status
- Extinct

Scientific classification
- Kingdom: Animalia
- Phylum: Chordata
- Class: Reptilia
- Order: Squamata
- Suborder: Iguania
- Family: Leiocephalidae
- Genus: Leiocephalus
- Species: †L. partitus

Binomial name
- †Leiocephalus partitus Pregill, 1981

Species of lizard

Leiocephalus partitus, commonly known as the Guanica curlytail, was a species of lizard in the family Leiocephalidae (curly-tailed lizard). It was native to Puerto Rico.
