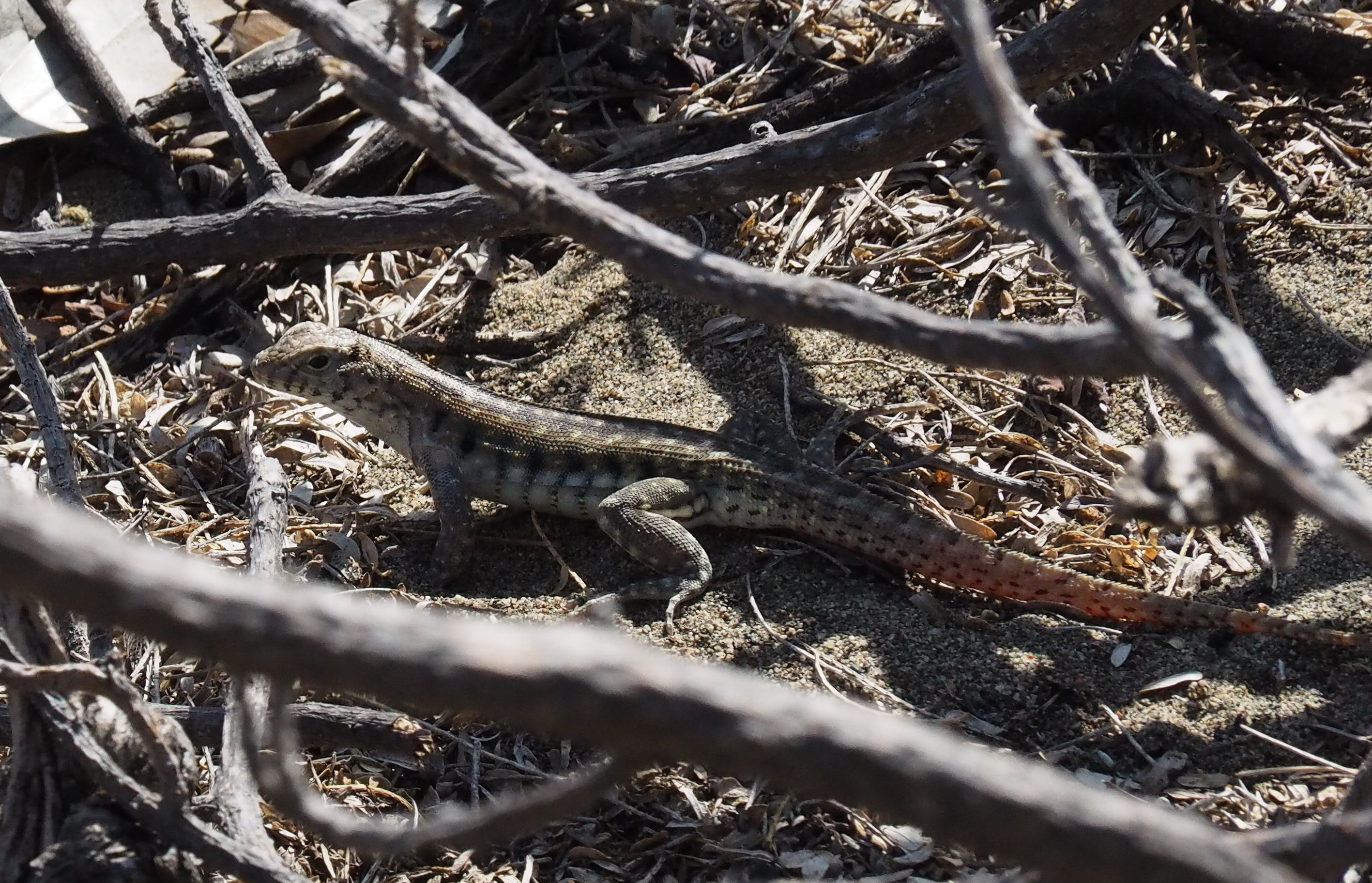

Scientific classification
- Kingdom: Animalia
- Phylum: Chordata
- Class: Reptilia
- Order: Squamata
- Suborder: Iguania
- Family: Leiocephalidae
- Genus: Leiocephalus
- Species: L. sixtoi

Binomial name
- Leiocephalus sixtoi Köhler, Bobadilla , & Hedges, 2016
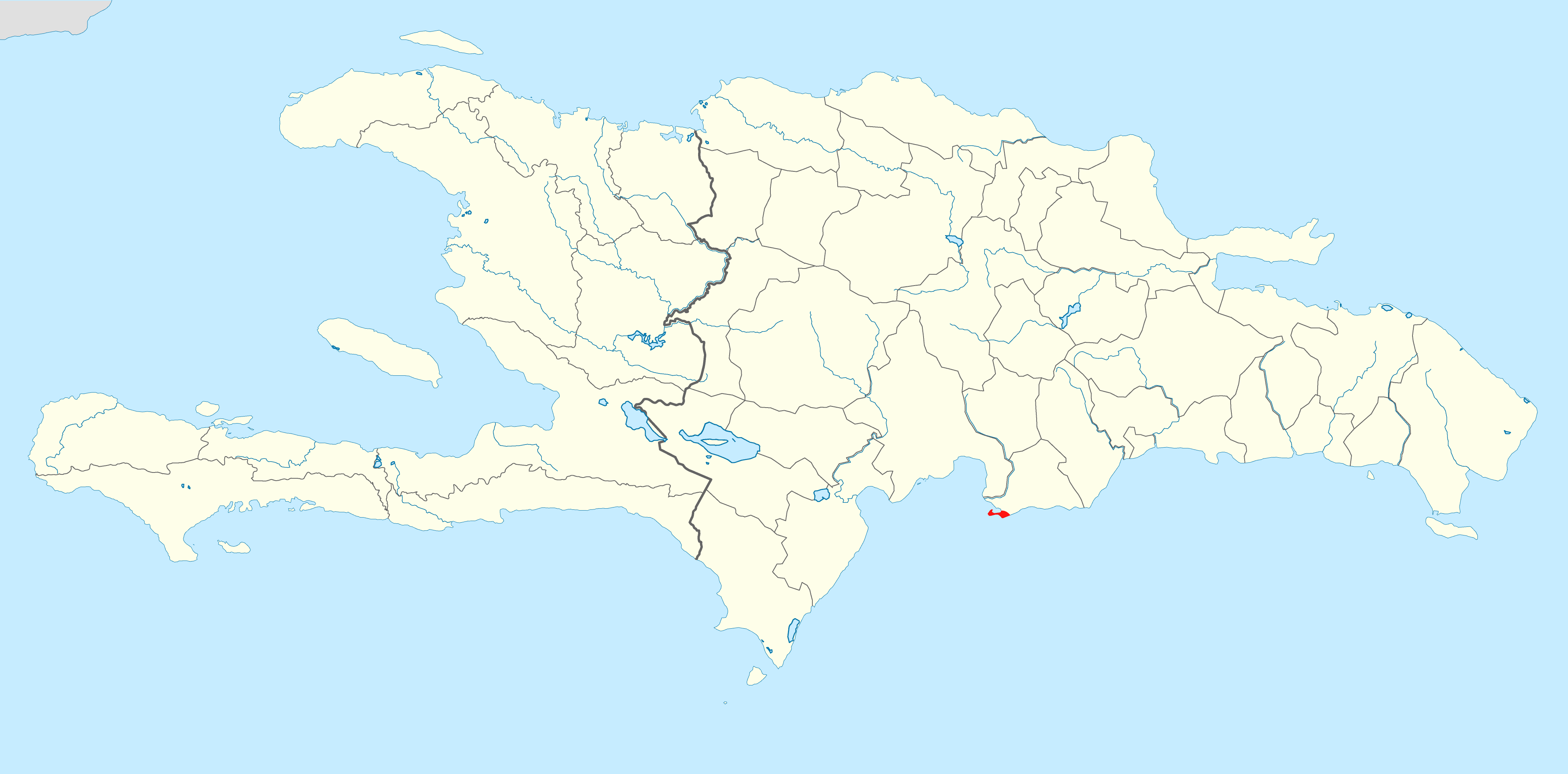
- Distribution of Leiocephalus sixtoi. Known range in red.

= Leiocephalus sixtoi =

Species of lizard

Leiocephalus sixtoi, also known as the Hispaniolan dune curlytail, the dune curly-tailed lizard, or Sixto's curly-tailed lizard is a species of lizard in the family Leiocephalidae. This species is endemic to the island of Hispaniola, and is only known in the sandy spaces of monumento natural Las Dunas de las Calderas, also known as Las Dunas de Baní.

== Description ==
This species is similar to L. schreibersii, but is strikingly different in coloration. Males of L. sixtoi have dark gray dorsum and red irises, contrasting with the typical light khaki dorsum and blue irises of L. schreibersii.

L. sixtoi is a diurnal and mostly feeds on terrestrial arthropods.
