= Leiocephalus pratensis =

Conservation status
- Critically Endangered (IUCN 3.1)

Scientific classification
- Kingdom: Animalia
- Phylum: Chordata
- Class: Reptilia
- Order: Squamata
- Suborder: Iguania
- Family: Leiocephalidae
- Genus: Leiocephalus
- Species: L. pratensis

Binomial name
- Leiocephalus pratensis (Cochran, 1928)

Species of lizard

Leiocephalus pratensis, commonly known as the Haitian striped curlytail or Atalaye curlytail lizard, is a species of lizard in the family Leiocephalidae (curly-tailed lizard). It is native to Haiti.
