= Leiocephalus semilineatus =

Conservation status
- Least Concern (IUCN 3.1)

Scientific classification
- Kingdom: Animalia
- Phylum: Chordata
- Class: Reptilia
- Order: Squamata
- Suborder: Iguania
- Family: Leiocephalidae
- Genus: Leiocephalus
- Species: L. semilineatus

Binomial name
- Leiocephalus semilineatus Dunn, 1920

Species of lizard

Leiocephalus semilineatus, commonly known as the Hispaniolan pale-bellied curlytail, Thomazeau curlytail lizard, or pale-bellied Hispaniolan curlytail, is a species of lizard in the family Leiocephalidae (curly-tailed lizard). It is native to Hispaniola.
