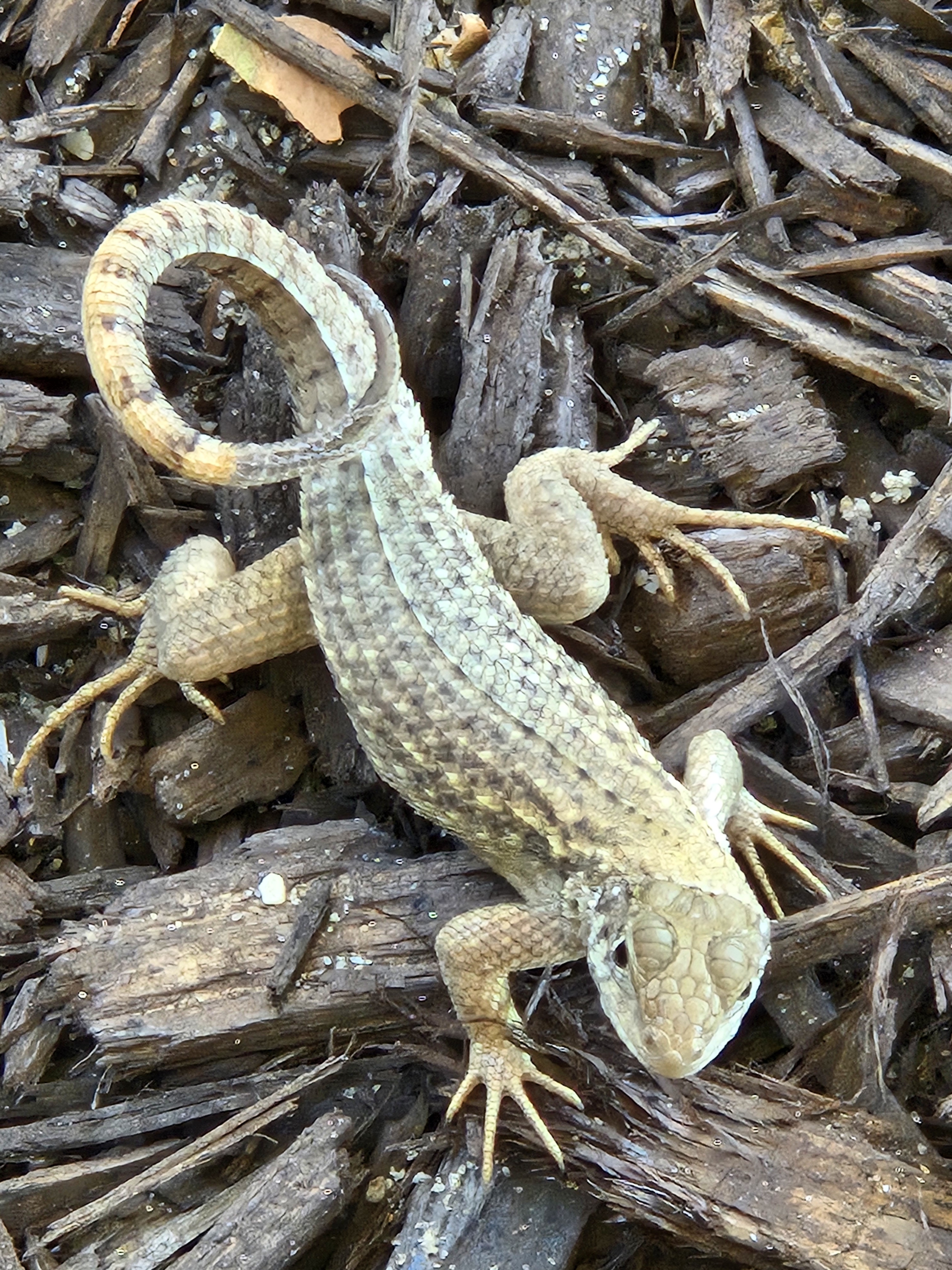

Conservation status
- Least Concern (IUCN 3.1)

Scientific classification
- Kingdom: Animalia
- Phylum: Chordata
- Class: Reptilia
- Order: Squamata
- Suborder: Iguania
- Family: Leiocephalidae
- Genus: Leiocephalus
- Species: L. carinatus

Binomial name
- Leiocephalus carinatus Gray, 1827

= Leiocephalus carinatus =

Species of lizard

Leiocephalus carinatus, commonly known as the northern curly-tailed lizard or saw-scaled curlytail, is a species of lizard in the family Leiocephalidae (curly-tailed lizard).

== Geographic range ==
It is native to the Bahama Islands, the Cayman Islands and Cuba. It was introduced intentionally in Palm Beach, Florida, in the 1940s in an attempt to control sugar cane pests, and is now also present in a few other parts of the state. Another introduced population inhabits Swan Islands, Honduras.

== Description ==
Adults may attain a snout to vent length (SVL) of 10.5 cm (4.1 in), or a total length, including the tail, of 26 cm (10 in). The dorsal scales are keeled and pointed. L. carinatus resembles lizards of the genus Sceloporus, but with the tail usually curled upward, especially when the lizard is in a horizontal position on rocks or on the ground.

== Behavior ==
An active, robust lizard, it is mostly terrestrial and will retreat into a burrow or cavity when frightened. It prefers sunny areas with loose rubble and rock. In the Cayman Islands a large captured specimen was observed to consistently burrow completely under the sand in a holding tank, even though a rock retreat was provided. The lizard also "played dead" when handled and remained completely motionless for a short while after being put down.

Leiocephalus carinatus utilizes tail curling as an antipredator measure when being chased. This behavior is predominantly seen when the predator is distant, as it is an attempt to intimidate would-be pursuers; when the predator is close however, the lizard instead seeks immediate refuge.

== Subspecies ==
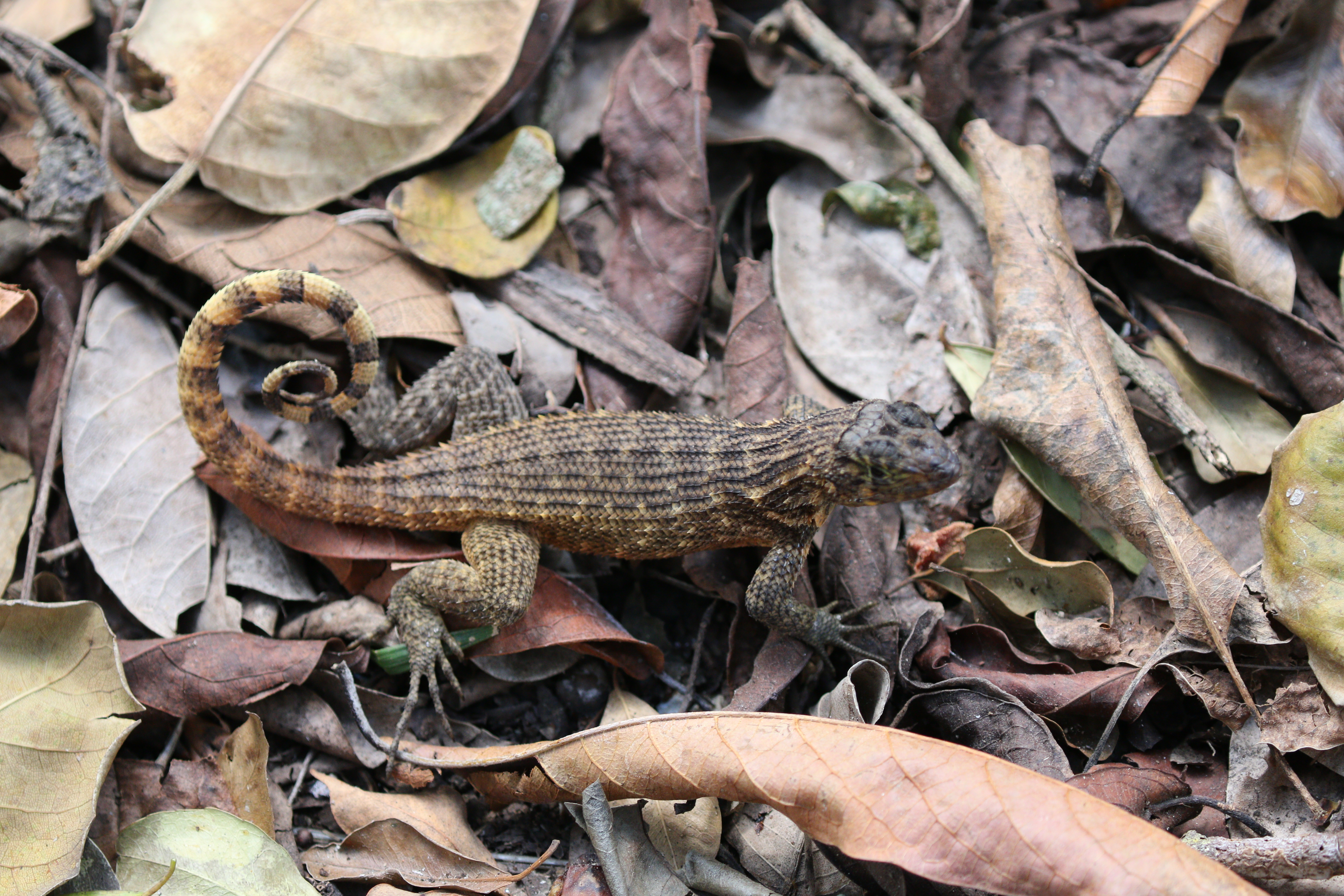
L. c. labrossytus, Playa Larga, Cuba

13 subspecies are recognized, including the nominate race:

- L. c. carinatus Gray, 1827
- L. c. aquarius Schwartz & Ogren, 1956
- L. c. armouri Barbour & Shreve, 1935
- L. c. cayensis Schwartz, 1959
- L. c. coryi K.P. Schmidt, 1936
- L. c. granti Rabb, 1957
- L. c. hodsdoni K.P. Schmidt, 1936
- L. c. labrossytus Schwartz, 1959, South Central Cuba, Playa Larga
- L. c. microcyon Schwartz, 1959
- L. c. mogotensis Schwartz, 1959
- L. c. virescens Stejneger, 1901
- L. c. zayasi Schwartz, 1959
