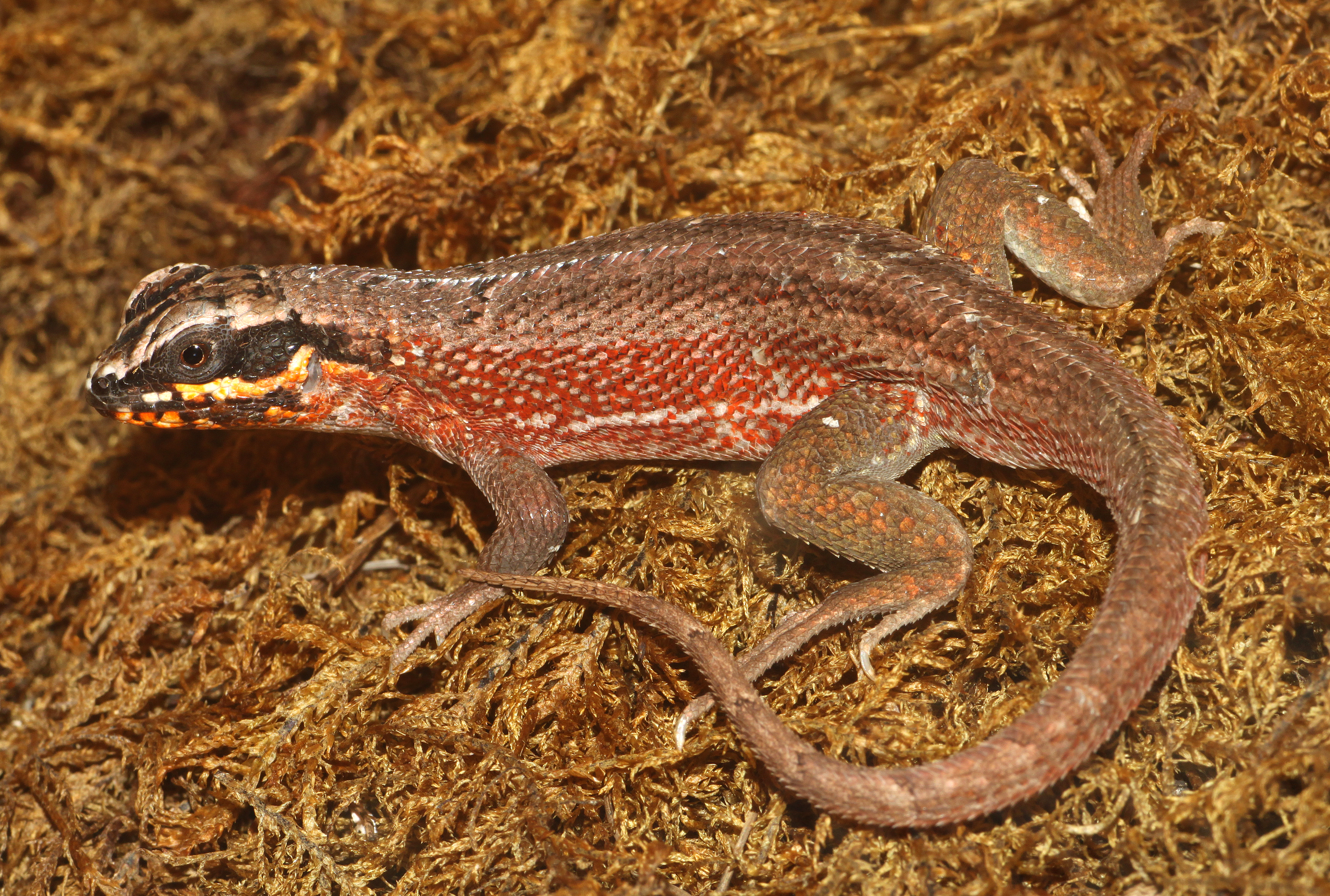

Conservation status
- Least Concern (IUCN 3.1)

Scientific classification
- Kingdom: Animalia
- Phylum: Chordata
- Class: Reptilia
- Order: Squamata
- Suborder: Iguania
- Family: Leiocephalidae
- Genus: Leiocephalus
- Species: L. personatus

Binomial name
- Leiocephalus personatus (Cope, 1862)

= Leiocephalus personatus =

Hispaniolan masked curly-tailed lizard

Species of lizard

The Hispaniolan masked curly-tailed lizard (Leiocephalus personatus) is a lizard species from the family of curly-tailed lizard (Leiocephalidae). It is also known as the Hispaniolan masked curlytail, Haitian curlytail lizard and the green-legged curly-tail. endemic to the Caribbean island of Hispaniola.

== Description ==
The species is sexually dimorphic, with the males being considerably larger, and having red markings on the head around the lower jaw. Females are much smaller, and are brown in colour, with lighter stripes running down the flanks. In males, the snout–vent length is 72 mm (2.8 in) with a tail of 122 mm (4.8 in). Adult males have a black face and throat, extending beyond the ear to the shoulder folds. Young males often have pale spots below and in front of the ears. The crown is brown. Older males often have a wide pale longitudinal stripe on the back as well as lateral stripes. The underparts are lightly spotted with black, including the chin, legs and rather paler tail. The female is rather smaller than the male with a snout-to-vent length of 54 mm (2.1 in) and is rather more drab in colouration, with four longitudinal pale stripes, much black barring between the stripes, and underparts heavily spotted with black.

== Distribution and habitat ==
This lizard is endemic to Hispaniola in the Caribbean Sea. It is known from various locations in Haiti and the Dominican Republic. It occurs at altitudes of up to about 625 m (2,000 ft). It mainly inhabits damp locations, but is also present in shaded parts of dry shrublands, including broadleaf woodland, pine forests, plantations, coastal scrub, gardens, arable land and pasture. It also occurs in urban areas, city parks and town gardens. This lizard was first recorded in Florida in 1994, where it was described as a newly arrived exotic species "likely to colonize natural areas". It is restricted to several localities in Dade County.

== Ecology ==
This lizard lives on the ground and is diurnal. It feeds mainly on insects and other small arthropods, but also eats some plant material. It is probably preyed on by the invasive small Indian mongoose (Urva auropunctata) which has been introduced to the island. A study of anti-predator behaviour among these lizards showed that those that lived in more open, exposed locations, tended to display such traits as longer limbs and faster sprint speeds.

== Status ==
Leiocephalus personatus is endemic to Hispaniola, but within its limited range it is a common species and no particular threats have been identified. The population appears to be stable and the International Union for Conservation of Nature has assessed its conservation status as being of "least concern".
