= Curly-tailed lizard =

- Leiocephalus carinatus

Scientific classification
- Kingdom: Animalia
- Phylum: Chordata
- Class: Reptilia
- Order: Squamata
- Suborder: Iguania
- Infraorder: Pleurodonta
- Family: Leiocephalidae; Frost & Etheridge, 1989
- Genus: Leiocephalus; Gray, 1827

Genus of lizards

Leiocephalus, also known as the curlytail lizards or curly-tailed lizards, is a genus of iguanian lizards restricted to the West Indies. It is the only genus in the family Leiocephalidae. One of the defining features of these lizards is that their tail often curls over. They were previously regarded as members of the subfamily Leiocephalinae within the family Tropiduridae. There are presently 30 known species in the genus

== Taxonomy ==
Phylogenetic evidence supports Leiocephalidae being the sister group to the remaining members of the clade Pleurodonta, having diverging from the rest of the suborder as early as the Late Cretaceous, about 91 million years ago. As with many other higher-order taxa endemic to the Caribbean, it likely colonized the Antilles from South America during the Cenozoic; however, its deep divergence time from other lizards supports a much more complex and less straightforward history in the West Indies compared to other modern taxa.

Phylogenetic analysis on the genus supports some members of the now-extinct Lesser Antillean Leiocephalus radiation being sister to the remaining Leiocephalus, with the last-surviving members of this group, L. herminieri and L. roquetus, sharing traits not present in other curlytail lizards from the Greater Antilles and other areas, such as the absence of enlarged snout scales. Within the remaining set of species, another recently extinct species, L. eremitus from Navassa, is sister to all other members of the genus from the Bahamas and Greater Antilles. Another extinct species from the Lesser Antilles known only from fossil remains, L. cuneus of Antigua and Barbuda, is thought to be more closely related to Leiocephalus from the Bahamas and Greater Antilles, such as L. carinatus, L. greenwayi and L. punctatus, than to the other Lesser Antillean and Navassa species.

== Distribution ==
Curlytail lizards are native to the West Indies, with the extant (living) species in the Bahamas, Turks and Caicos, Cayman Islands, Cuba, Hispaniola (Haiti and the Dominican Republic) and nearby small islands. Additionally, Leiocephalus carinatus and Leiocephalus schreibersii have been introduced to Florida.

=== Former distribution ===
Curlytail lizards formerly had a much wider native range, being distributed south to Jamaica and east to Puerto Rico and several of the Lesser Antilles. They went extinct in most of this range during the Quaternary extinction or Holocene extinction, with some members of the Lesser Antillean radiation surviving to recent times, perhaps remaining widespread until after European colonization. The last surviving members of the Lesser Antillean radiation, L. herminieri of Guadeloupe and L. roquetus of Martinique, went extinct during the early-mid 19th century.

== General anatomy ==
The curly-tailed lizards vary in size depending on species, but typically are approximately 9 cm (3.5 in) in snout-to-vent length. These lizards have no femoral pores, pterygoid teeth, or palatine teeth. Additionally, these lizards are observed to have overlapping scales.

== Behavior ==
The curly-tailed lizards mostly forage on arthropods such as insects, but also commonly take flowers and fruits. Large individuals will eat small vertebrates, including anoles.

As suggested by their name, most species of this family often lift their tail and curl it. This is done both when a potential predator is present and when not present, although in some curly-tailed lizard species it increases when a predator is present. It shows the fitness of the lizard to a would-be predator and—in the case of an attack—draws attention to the tail, which increases the lizard's chance of escaping. Although it has been suggested that it also functions as a territorial display, studies have been unable to find support for this, as the tail curling does not vary when another member of the same species is present.

== Conservation status and extinctions ==
The conservation status of the species in this family varies greatly. Several species, for example Leiocephalus carinatus, are common and widespread. Others are rare and highly threatened, especially those restricted to a single small island or a single location on a larger island, like the critically endangered Leiocephalus (barahonensis) altavelensis from Alto Velo Island and critically endangered Leiocephalus onaneyi from Guantánamo Province in Cuba. Primary threats to their survival are habitat loss (for example, expanding agriculture, charcoal production and grazing goats) and introduced predators (for example, small Indian mongoose).

Several species of Leiocephalus are already extinct, including all of the Jamaican, Puerto Rican and Lesser Antillean members of the genus. Some of these are only known from fossil or subfossil remains and became extinct in the Pleistocene or pre-Columbian era, but others such as two Lesser Antillean species and one from Navassa survived until comparatively recently, during the 19th century. Leiocephalus is the only known squamate genus to be entirely wiped out from the Lesser Antilles following European colonization; other reptilian genera that have also seen significant extirpations in the Lesser Antilles, such as Boa or Diploglossus, still retain relict populations on at least some islands, such as Dominica and Montserrat. This mass disappearance of Leiocephalus from the Lesser Antilles may be due to their inhabiting dry forests in littoral areas that were heavily exploited and deforested by early colonists. Few confirmed Leiocephalus fossil remains from after the early Holocene are known from the Lesser Antilles, which has raised doubts about their being only recently extirpated from this area; however, Leiocephalus fossil bones are small and closely resemble those of other lizard species, which may explain the lack of detection of Leiocephalus fossil bones from these areas aside from by the most highly trained palaeo-herpetologists.

In modern times, three species, Leiocephalus endomychus, Leiocephalus pratensis and Leiocephalus rhutidira, have not been seen since the 1960s and 1970s and are recognized as critically endangered, possibly extinct, by the IUCN. They are among the "most wanted" EDGE species.

== Newly discovered species ==
Lizards of this family are diurnal and mostly inhabit fairly open habitats in a generally well-studied part of the world. Consequently, the majority of the species and subspecies already were scientifically described several decades ago. In 2016, the first new curly-tailed lizard since the early 1980s was described. The species was found in the coastal dunes of Bahía de las Calderas in the southwestern Dominican Republic. This species differs from the rest within Leiocephalidae in that its bony parietal table is U-shaped versus V-shaped, the males have 3–4 enlarged post-postcloacal scales versus 2, and there are specific sexual dimorphism trails.

== Species and subspecies ==
The following species and subspecies, listed alphabetically by scientific name, are recognized as being valid by the Reptile Database.

=== Extant and recently extinct species ===
Image	Scientific name	Common Name	Subspecies	Distribution
	Leiocephalus barahonensis Schmidt, 1921	orange-bellied curlytail	L. b. altavelensis Noble & Hassler, 1933 – Alto Velo curly-tailed lizard, Alto Velo curlytail (likely better regarded as a separate species); L. b. aureus Cochran, 1934; L. b. barahonensis Schmidt, 1921; L. b. beatanus Noble, 1923; L. b. oxygaster A. Schwartz, 1967	Hispaniola
	Leiocephalus carinatus Gray, 1827	saw-scaled curlytail, northern curly-tailed lizard	L. c. carinatus Gray, 1827; L. c. aquarius Schwartz & Ogren, 1956; L. c. armouri Barbour & Shreve, 1935; L. c. cayensis Schwartz, 1959; L. c. coryi K.P. Schmidt, 1936; L. c. granti Rabb, 1957; L. c. hodsdoni K.P. Schmidt, 1936; L. c. labrossytus Schwartz, 1959, South Central Cuba, Playa Larga; L. c. microcyon Schwartz, 1959; L. c. mogotensis Schwartz, 1959; L. c. virescens Stejneger, 1901; L. c. zayasi Schwartz, 1959	Bahama Islands, the Cayman Islands and Cuba
	Leiocephalus cubensis (Gray, 1840)	Cuban brown curlytail, Cuban curlytail lizard	L. c. cubensis (Gray, 1840); L. c. gigas A. Schwartz, 1959; L. c. minor Varona & Garrido, 1970; L. c. pambasileus A. Schwartz, 1959; L. c. paraphrus A. Schwartz, 1959	Cuba.
	Leiocephalus endomychus A. Schwartz, 1967	Hinche curlytail, Central Haitian curlytail (possibly extinct, last seen in 1976)		Haiti
	†Leiocephalus eremitus (Cope, 1868)	Navassa curlytail lizard (extinct, 19th century)		Navassa Island
	Leiocephalus greenwayi Barbour & Shreve, 1935	East Plana curlytail, Plana Cay curlytail lizard		Bahama Islands
	†Leiocephalus herminieri (A.M.C. Duméril & Bibron, 1837)	Martinique curlytail lizard (extinct, 19th century)		Trinidad and Tobago
	Leiocephalus inaguae Cochran, 1931	Inagua curlytail lizard		Bahamas
	Leiocephalus loxogrammus (Cope, 1887)	San Salvador curlytail, Rum Cay curlytail lizard	L. l. loxogrammus (Cope, 1887); L. l. parnelli Barbour & Shreve, 1935	Bahamas
	Leiocephalus lunatus Cochran, 1934	Hispaniolan maskless curlytail, Santo Domingo curlytail lizard	L. l. arenicolor Mertens, 1939; L. l. lewisi A. Schwartz, 1967; L. l. louisae Cochran, 1934; L. l. lunatus Cochran, 1934; L. l. melaenoscelis A. Schwartz, 1967; L. l. thomasi A. Schwartz, 1967	Dominican Republic.
	Leiocephalus macropus (Cope, 1863)	Cuban side-blotched curlytail, Monte Verde curlytail lizard	L. m. aegialus A. Schwartz & Garrido, 1967; L. m. asbolomus A. Schwartz & Garrido, 1967; L. m. felinoi Garrido, 1979; L. m. hoplites Zug, 1959; L. m. hyacinthurus Zug, 1959; L. m. immaculatus Hardy, 1958; L. m. koopmani Zug, 1959; L. m. lenticulatus Garrido, 1973; L. m. macropus (Cope, 1863); L. m. phylax A. Schwartz & Garrido, 1967; L. m. torrei Garrido, 1979	Cuba.
	Leiocephalus melanochlorus (Cope, 1863)	Tiburon curlytail, Jérémie curlytailed lizard	L. m. hypsistus Schwartz, 1966; L. m. melanochlorus (Cope, 1863)	Haiti.
	Leiocephalus onaneyi Garrido, 1973	Guantanamo striped curlytail, Guantanamo striped curly-tailed lizard, Sierra curlytail lizard		Cuba.
	Leiocephalus personatus (Cope, 1863)	Hispaniolan masked curlytail, Haitian curlytail lizard		Hispaniola.
	Leiocephalus pratensis (Cochran, 1928)	Haitian striped curlytail, Atalaye curlytail lizard (possibly extinct, last seen in 1966)	L. p. chimarus A. Schwartz, 1979; L. p. pratensis (Cochran, 1928)	Haiti.
	Leiocephalus psammodromus Barbour, 1920	Turks and Caicos curlytail, Bastion Cay curlytail lizard	L. p. aphretor A. Schwartz, 1967; L. p. apocrinus A. Schwartz, 1967; L. p. cacodoxus A. Schwartz, 1967; L. p. hyphantus A. Schwartz, 1967; L. p. mounax A. Schwartz, 1967; L. p. psammodromus Barbour, 1920	Turks and Caicos Islands
	Leiocephalus punctatus Cochran, 1931	Crooked Acklins curlytail, spotted curlytail lizard		Bahamas.
	Leiocephalus raviceps (Cope, 1863)	pallid curlytail, mountain curlytail lizard	L. r. delavarai Garrido, 1973; L. r. jaumei A. Schwartz & Garrido, 1968; L. r. kilinikowski A. Schwartz, 1960; L. r. raviceps (Cope, 1863); L. r. uzzelli A. Schwartz, 1960	Cuba.
	Leiocephalus rhutidira A. Schwartz, 1979	Haitian black-throated curlytail, Lapierre curlytail lizard (possibly extinct, last seen in 1978)		Haiti.
	†Leiocephalus roquetus Bochaton, Charles, and Lenoble, 2021	La Désirade curlytail lizard, curlytail roquet (extinct, late 19th century)		Guadeloupe.
	Leiocephalus schreibersii (Gravenhorst, 1838)	red-sided curlytail, red-sided curly-tailed lizard	L. s. nesomorus A. Schwartz, 1968; L. s. schreibersii (Gravenhorst, 1838)	Hispaniola
	Leiocephalus semilineatus Dunn, 1920	Hispaniolan pale-bellied curlytail, Thomazeau curlytail lizard, Pale-bellied Hispaniolan curlytail		Hispaniola.
	Leiocephalus sixtoi Kohler, Bobadilla, & Hedges, 2016	Hispaniolan dune curlytail		Hispaniola.
	Leiocephalus stictigaster A. Schwartz, 1959	Cuban striped curlytail, Cabo Corrientes curlytail lizard	L. s. astictus A. Schwartz, 1959; L. s. celeustes A. Schwartz & Garrido, 1968; L. s. exotheotus A. Schwartz, 1959; L. s. gibarensis A. Schwartz & Garrido, 1968; L. s. lipomator A. Schwartz & Garrido, 1968; L. s. lucianus A. Schwartz, 1960; L. s. naranjoi A. Schwartz & Garrido, 1968; L. s. ophiplacodes A. Schwartz, 1964; L. s. parasphex A. Schwartz, 1964; L. s. septentrionalis Garrido, 1975; L. s. sierrae A. Schwartz, 1959; L. s. stictigaster A. Schwartz, 1959	Cuba.
	Leiocephalus varius Garman, 1887	Cayman curlytail, Cayman curly-tailed lizard		Cayman Islands.
	Leiocephalus vinculum Cochran, 1928	Gonave curlytail, Cochran's curlytail lizard		Haiti.

=== Fossil and subfossil species ===
- †Leiocephalus anonymous Pregill, 1984 – Hispaniola
- †Leiocephalus apertosulcus Etheridge, 1965 – Hispaniola
- †Leiocephalus cuneus Etheridge, 1964 – Leeward Islands curlytail (extinct, Late Quaternary of Antigua and Barbuda and potentially Anguilla, La Désirade, and Marie-Galante, but might have survived to recent times)
- †Leiocephalus etheridgei Pregill, 1981 – Morovis curlytail (extinct, Late Pleistocene of Puerto Rico)
- †Leiocephalus jamaicensis Etheridge, 1966 – Jamaican curlytail (extinct, Late Pleistocene or Holocene of Jamaica)
- †Leiocephalus partitus Pregill, 1981 – Guánica curlytail (extinct, Pleistocene or Holocene of Puerto Rico)

Nota bene: A binomial authority or trinomial authority in parentheses indicates that the species or subspecies was originally described in a genus other than Leiocephalus.
