= Leiocephalus barahonensis =

Conservation status
- Least Concern (IUCN 3.1)

Scientific classification
- Kingdom: Animalia
- Phylum: Chordata
- Class: Reptilia
- Order: Squamata
- Suborder: Iguania
- Family: Leiocephalidae
- Genus: Leiocephalus
- Species: L. barahonensis

Binomial name
- Leiocephalus barahonensis Schmidt, 1921

Species of lizard

Leiocephalus barahonensis, commonly known as the orange-bellied curlytail or Barahona curlytail lizard, is a species of lizard in the family Leiocephalidae (curly-tailed lizard). It is endemic to Hispaniola, including some outlying islands.

Five subspecies are recognized:

- Leiocephalus barahonensis barahonensis Schmidt, 1921
- Leiocephalus barahonensis altavelensis Noble and Hassler, 1933
- Leiocephalus barahonensis aureus Cochran, 1934
- Leiocephalus barahonensis beatanus Noble, 1923
- Leiocephalus barahonensis oxygaster Schmidt, 1967

However, IUCN and "Amphibians and reptiles of Caribbean Islands" treat Leiocephalus barahonensis altavelensis as a separate species Leiocephalus altavelensis, which species/subspecies is endemic to Alto Velo Island and considered "critically endangered" with a total population size that is no more than 500 individuals.
