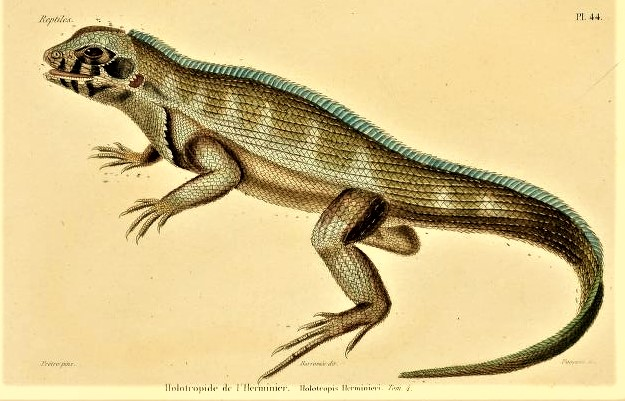

Conservation status
- Extinct (IUCN 3.1)

Scientific classification
- Kingdom: Animalia
- Phylum: Chordata
- Class: Reptilia
- Order: Squamata
- Suborder: Iguania
- Family: Leiocephalidae
- Genus: Leiocephalus
- Species: †L. herminieri

Binomial name
- †Leiocephalus herminieri (A.M.C. Duméril & Bibron, 1837)

Synonyms
- Holotropis herminieri A.M.C. Duméril & Bibron, 1837; Leiocephalus herminieri — Gray, 1845; Liocephalus [sic] herminieri — Boulenger, 1885; Leiocephalus herminieri — Schwartz & Thomas, 1975

= Martinique curlytail lizard =

Extinct species of lizard

The Martinique curlytail lizard (Leiocephalus herminieri) is an extinct species of lizard in the family of curly-tailed lizard (Leiocephalidae).

== Etymology ==
The specific name, herminieri, commemorates French naturalist Félix Louis L'Herminier.

== Extant specimens ==
There are five specimens of L. herminieri, of which three are deposited in the National Museum of Natural History, Paris, one in London, and the other in Leiden.

== Geographic range ==
Though Martinique is assumed as the geographic range of L. herminieri, there was some confusion about the type locality in the past. While André Marie Constant Duméril and Gabriel Bibron stated Martinique and Trinidad and Tobago as type locality, George Albert Boulenger has given only Trinidad and Tobago as terra typica.

== Biology and extinction ==
The biology of L. herminieri, the reasons for its extinction, and the date of extinction are unknown. This species was last collected in the 1830s.

== Description ==
Of the three specimens of L. herminieri in Paris, the largest female is measured at 139 mm (5.5 in) snout-to-vent length (SVL), and the largest male at 126 mm (5.0 in) SVL. The large head scales are more or less distinctly striate. The large dorsal scales are keeled and forming continuous oblique series. The smaller lateral and ventral scales are keeled too. The back is greenish brown with or without irregular yellowish crossbands. The head is yellowish with four or five black bars on the sides. The venter is yellowish. The throat has oblique black transverse bands.
