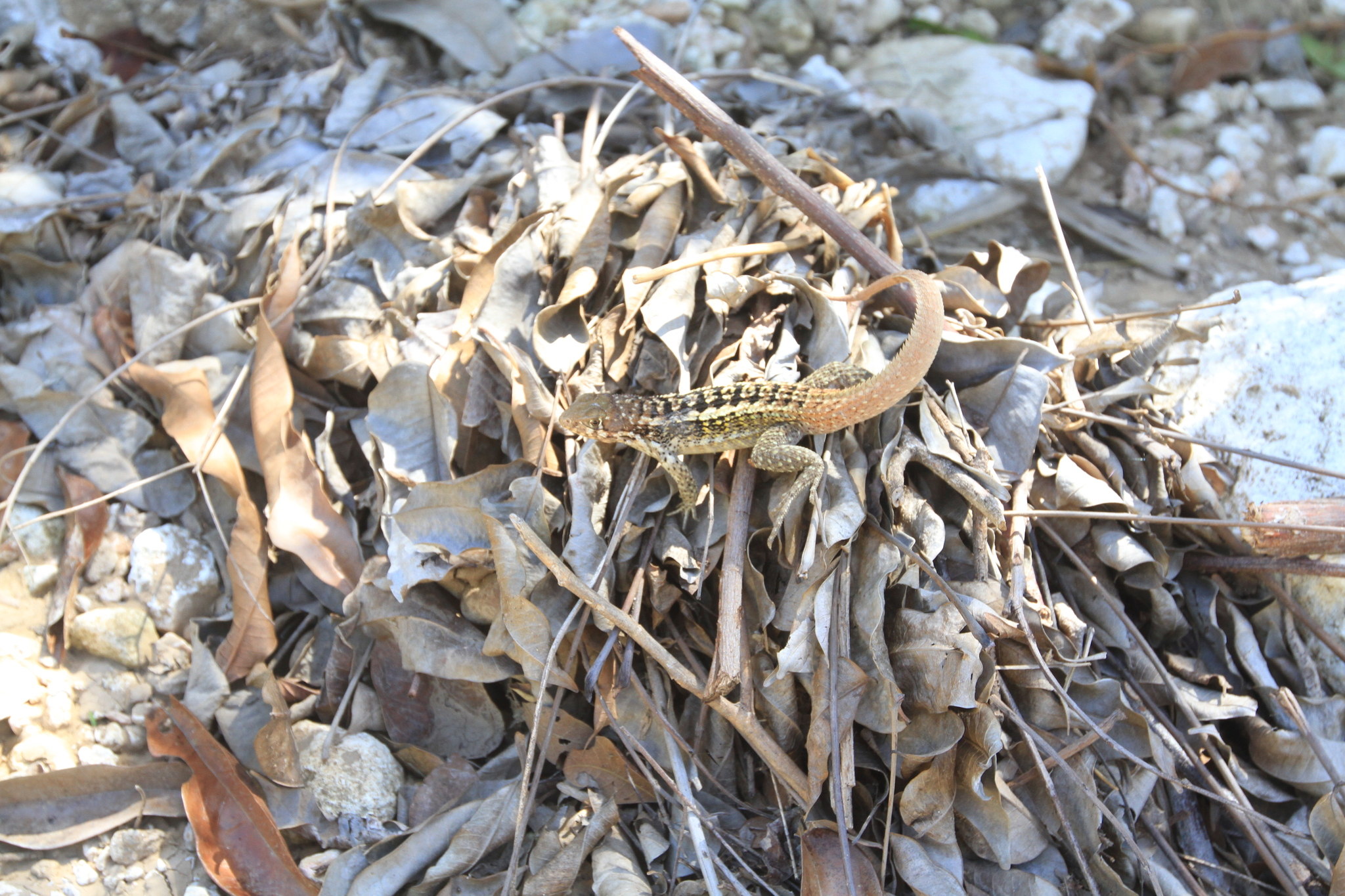

Conservation status
- Near Threatened (IUCN 3.1)

Scientific classification
- Kingdom: Animalia
- Phylum: Chordata
- Class: Reptilia
- Order: Squamata
- Suborder: Iguania
- Family: Leiocephalidae
- Genus: Leiocephalus
- Species: L. melanochlorus

Binomial name
- Leiocephalus melanochlorus Cope, 1863

= Leiocephalus melanochlorus =

Species of lizard

Leiocephalus melanochlorus, commonly known as the Tiburon curlytail or Jeremie curlytail lizard, is a species of lizard in the family Leiocephalidae (curly-tailed lizard). It is native to Haiti.
