= Leiocephalus greenwayi =

Conservation status
- Vulnerable (IUCN 3.1)

Scientific classification
- Kingdom: Animalia
- Phylum: Chordata
- Class: Reptilia
- Order: Squamata
- Suborder: Iguania
- Family: Leiocephalidae
- Genus: Leiocephalus
- Species: L. greenwayi

Binomial name
- Leiocephalus greenwayi Barbour & Shreve, 1935

Species of lizard

Leiocephalus greenwayi, commonly known as the East Plana curlytail and the Plana Cay curlytail lizard, is a species of lizard in the family of curly-tailed lizards (Leiocephalidae). The species is native to the West Indies.

== Etymology ==
The specific name, greenwayi, is in honor of American ornithologist James Cowan Greenway.

== Geographic range ==
L. greenwayi is endemic to the Bahama Islands and has an extremely restricted range as it is only found on the Eastern island of the Plana Cays.

== Habitat ==
The preferred natural habitat of L. greenwayi is shrubland.

== Reproduction ==
L. greenwayi is oviparous.

== Conservation status ==
This species of curly-tailed lizard, L. greenwayi, is not listed by the IUCN or CITES as needing any special conservation, however, research is needed to determine its vulnerability due to its restricted range.
