= Leiocephalus cuneus =

Conservation status
- Extinct (IUCN 3.1)

Scientific classification
- Kingdom: Animalia
- Phylum: Chordata
- Class: Reptilia
- Order: Squamata
- Suborder: Iguania
- Family: Leiocephalidae
- Genus: Leiocephalus
- Species: †L. cuneus

Binomial name
- †Leiocephalus cuneus Etheridge, 1964

Species of lizard

Leiocephalus cuneus, commonly known as the Leeward Islands curlytail, is a species of lizard in the family Leiocephalidae (curly-tailed lizard). It is native to Barbuda and Antigua.
